= São Carlos (disambiguation) =

São Carlos is Portuguese for Saint Charles. It may also refer to:

== Places ==
- São Carlos, the city of the state of São Paulo in Brazil.
  - São Carlos Airport, the city of São Carlos airport.
- São Carlos, Santa Catarina, the city of the state of Santa Catarina in Brazil.

== Theatres ==
- Teatro Nacional de São Carlos, the main Lisbon opera theatre.
- Teatro Municipal de São Carlos, the main São Carlos theatre.

== Sport ==
- São Carlos FC, a Brazilian football (soccer) team.
- São Carlos Clube, a club in the city of São Carlos, Brazil.
