= Brotas =

- Municipality
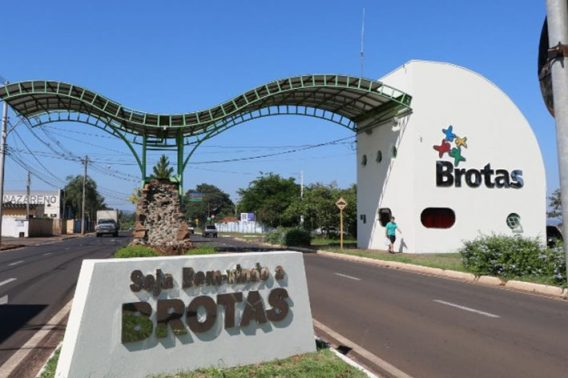

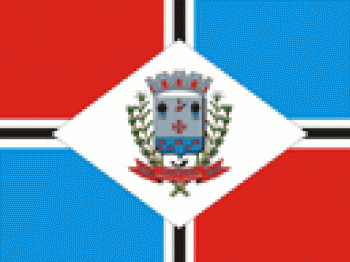
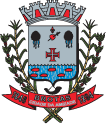
- Flag Coat of arms

- Location in São Paulo state

- Location in Brazil
- Coordinates: 22°17′05″S 48°07′38″W
- Country: Brazil
- Region: Southeast
- State: São Paulo

Area
  - Total: 1,101 km^{2} (425 sq mi)
- Elevation: 647 m (2,123 ft)

Population (2020)
  - Total: 24,636
  - Density: 22.38/km^{2} (57.95/sq mi)
- Time zone: UTC−3 (BRT)
- Postal code: 17380-000

Brotas is a Brazilian municipality located in the state of São Paulo. The population is 24.423 (2024 est.) in an area of 1101 km^{2}. The town is known locally for its coffee, on which its economy relies.

== History ==
The city's history started in 1839 when a chapel was built which originated a settlement around it. Brotas became a district of Araraquara in 1841, then it became a district of Rio Claro in 1853. On August 22, 1859, the district was promoted to a municipality.

The municipality experienced its greater development era during the coffee farming expansion which occurred between the 1920s and the 1930s. During this era the city received a large number of Italian immigrants. Due to the coffee agriculture decline, a large number of Brotas' citizens migrated to larger cities.

The municipality contains 44% of the Itirapina Ecological Station, created in 1984.

== Demographics ==
Historical population (municipality)
Year	Population	%±
1920	18,305
1940	17,741	−3.1%
1950	13,648	−23.1%
1960	13,126	−3.8%
1970	11,962	−8.9%
1980	11,262	−5.9%
1991	14,402	27.9%
2000	18,886	31.1%
2010	21,580	14.3%
2022	23,898	10.7%

== Economy ==
Brotas is internationally known for adventure tourism, including activities such as rafting and canoeing on the Jacaré Pepira River.

Nowadays the municipality's economy based in farming and cattle raising, especially in the culture of sugar cane and orange, despite the growing relevance of adventure tourism.

The municipality contains the strictly protected Mata do Jacaré Ecological Station on the south bank of the reservoir formed by the Santana Dam on the Jacaré-Guaçu River, which separates the municipalities of Brotas and São Carlos.

The Brotas region, including the Patrimônio de São Sebastião neighborhood and the city of Torrinha, feature an elevated number of landforms of great interest for tourists.

== Media ==
In telecommunications, the city was served by Companhia Telefônica Brasileira until 1973, when it began to be served by Telecomunicações de São Paulo. In July 1998, this company was acquired by Telefónica, which adopted the Vivo brand in 2012.

The company is currently an operator of cell phones, fixed lines, internet (fiber optics/4G) and television (satellite and cable).
