= Rugby São Carlos =

(Brazil) Rugby São Carlos
- Full name: Associação Esportiva Rugby São Carlos
- Union: CBRu, FPR
- Nickname: São Carlos
- Founded: March 6, 2000
- Region: São Carlos, SP, Brazil
- Ground(s): USP São Carlos Field; Água Vermelha Field (Capacity: 2.000)
- President: Jean Marc Bolonha Volland
- League(s): (São Paulo (state)) Campeonato Paulista de Rugby, Copa Central
1st kit	2nd kit

Official website
- www.rugbysaocarlos.com.br

Rugby São Carlos, is a Brazilian rugby team based in São Carlos, established in 2000.

== History ==
The first rugby team in São Carlos appeared in 1990, where some foreign fans of the sport arrived in the city. Finding new partners, they formed the first team called São Carlos Rugby Club. However, over the years interest fell and this team ceased to exist in the mid-1990s.

In 2000, after the arrival of André Felipe Rudge Barbosa (a.k.a. Cachorrão), and support of the Academic Sports of the University of São Paulo, a new team now called the Rugby São Carlos was established. The club has won the Campeonato Paulista do Interior, also known as Caipirão (state league) in 2006. The Rugby São Carlos also contests rugby sevens and beach rugby tournaments.

== Titles and awards ==
- 2019: Runner-up in VII Sanca Sevens (São Paulo (state))
- 2018: Runner-up in VI Sanca Sevens (São Paulo (state))
- 2018: Golden Medal in Jogos Regionais (representing São Carlos, seven-a-side)
- 2018: Champion in Copa Central (São Paulo (state))
- 2018: Conde do Pinhal Bowl
- 2017: Champion in V Sanca Sevens (São Paulo (state))
- 2017: Champion in Copa Sevens (São Paulo (state))
- 2016: Runner-up in IV Sanca Sevens (São Paulo (state))
- 2016: Champion in Pira Sevens (São Paulo (state))
- 2016: Champion in Paulista B (São Paulo (state))
- 2016: Conde do Pinhal Bowl
- 2015: Runner-up in III Sanca Sevens
- 2015: Champion in II Rio Claro Sevens
- 2014: Shield Cup in XXII SPAC Lions
- 2014: Runner-up in II Sanca Sevens
- 2014: Champion in Paulista de Acesso
- 2013: Bowl Cup in XXI SPAC Lions
- 2013: Champion in I Sanca Sevens
- 2013: Champion in Copa Central de Rugby
- 2012: Bronze medal in Jogos Abertos do Interior (representing São Carlos, seven-a-side)
- 2011: Gold medal in Jogos Abertos do Interior (representing São Carlos, seven-a-side)
- 2008: Runner-up in Campeonato Paulista de Rugby do Interior
- 2006: Champion in Campeonato Paulista de Rugby do Interior
- 2005: Runner-up in Campeonato Paulista de Rugby do Interior
- 2005: Runner-up in I Copa Campinas de Rugby (ten-a-side)

== Categories ==
The club also runs youth teams.
