= St. Charles Borromeo Cathedral, São Carlos =

Catholic Temple in São Paulo, Brazil

St. Charles Borromeo Cathedral
- Catedral São Carlos Borromeu
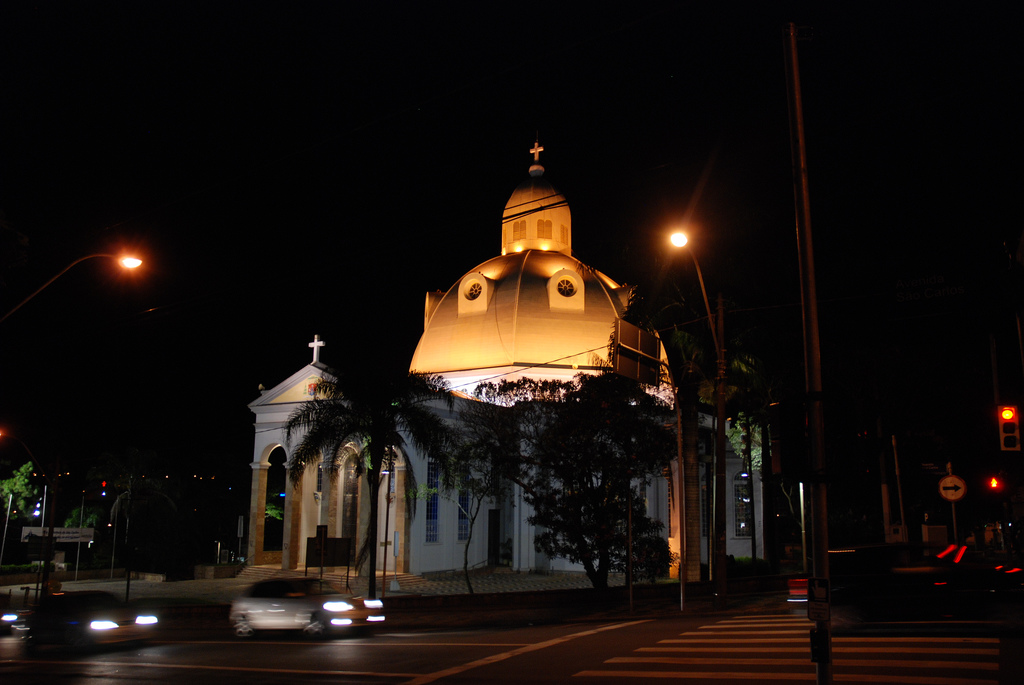
- St. Charles Borromeo Cathedral
- 22°01′04″S 47°53′27″W
- Location: São Carlos, São Paulo
- Country: Brazil
- Denomination: Roman Catholic Church
- Website: https://catedralsaocarlos.com.br/

Architecture
- Architects: Emanuel Gianni (engineering); Lafael Petroni (structural engineering); Ernfrid Frick (model); Lorenz Heilmair (stained glass)
- Style: Eclectic
- Completed: 1856 (old chapel); 1970 (consecration)

Administration
- Diocese: Roman Catholic Diocese of São Carlos

The Saint Charles Borromeo Cathedral (Portuguese: Catedral São Carlos Borromeu) is a Catholic temple located in the Don José Marcondes Homem de Melo Square, in the Brazilian city of São Carlos, São Paulo. It has a dome of more than 70 m (230 ft) in height and 30 m (98 ft) in diameter, which is an architectural replica of that of the Basilica of St. Peter in Vatican City.

The cathedral was built on the site where the first chapel was erected, between the streets Conde do Pinhal and Trece de Mayo, in the central area of São Carlos. The project was designed by engineer Emanuel Gianni, using a model by Professor Ernfrid Frick and a structural design by engineer Lafael Petroni. It included stained glass windows by Lorenz Heilmair, altars in Carrara marble and the Way of the Cross executed by local artist Almira Ragonesi Bruno. The image of Saint Charles Borromeo with his head and hands carved in wood, which dates from the founding of the city, stands in the church.

On June 7, 1908, after the creation of the Diocese of São Carlos, the church was elevated to the category of cathedral.

== History ==
The first chapel was built in wood in 1856 before the written authorization of Bishop Antônio Joaquim de Melo, who arrived on February 4, 1857. It was consecrated to Saint Charles Borromeo as he was the patron saint of the Arruda Botelho family, who owned the land where the chapel was being built and founded the city of São Carlos on November 4, 1857.

On December 27, 1857, Father Joaquim Cipriano de Camargo, vicar of Araraquara, inaugurated the Saint Charles Chapel and celebrated the first mass. On February 2, 1858, Dom Antônio Joaquim de Melo, bishop of São Paulo, promoted the chapel to the category of parish. Due to the precariousness of the building, Father Joaquim Botelho da Fonseca only moved in two years later. In 1868, the temple underwent renovations aided by the City Council and Aurelio Civatti. It included the original chapel, which was gradually demolished as the new church rose. In 1873, a new wooden temple replaced the first chapel.

A visit by Emperor Dom Pedro II to São Carlos in 1886 prompted the renovation of the church. A tower including a rounded dome was also built. On March 21, 1910, a clock produced by the Michelini Clock factory was inaugurated. In 1918, a renovation to the facade changed the tower to a square base topped by an octagonal pyramid. On June 7, 1908, after the creation of the Diocese of São Carlos, the church was elevated to the category of cathedral.

Between 1937 and 1945, during the episcopate of Dom Gastão, the second bishop of the Diocese of São Carlos, discussions began about a great renovation of the cathedral. He wanted to build a new church on a different site (where the XV Square stands today), while keeping the old church untouched. However, the local population demanded that the new cathedral be built on the same site as the old one. In 1946, Bishop Ruy Serra decided to keep the cathedral in the same place, and on November 4, 1946, he blessed the cornerstone of the new church.

== New building ==
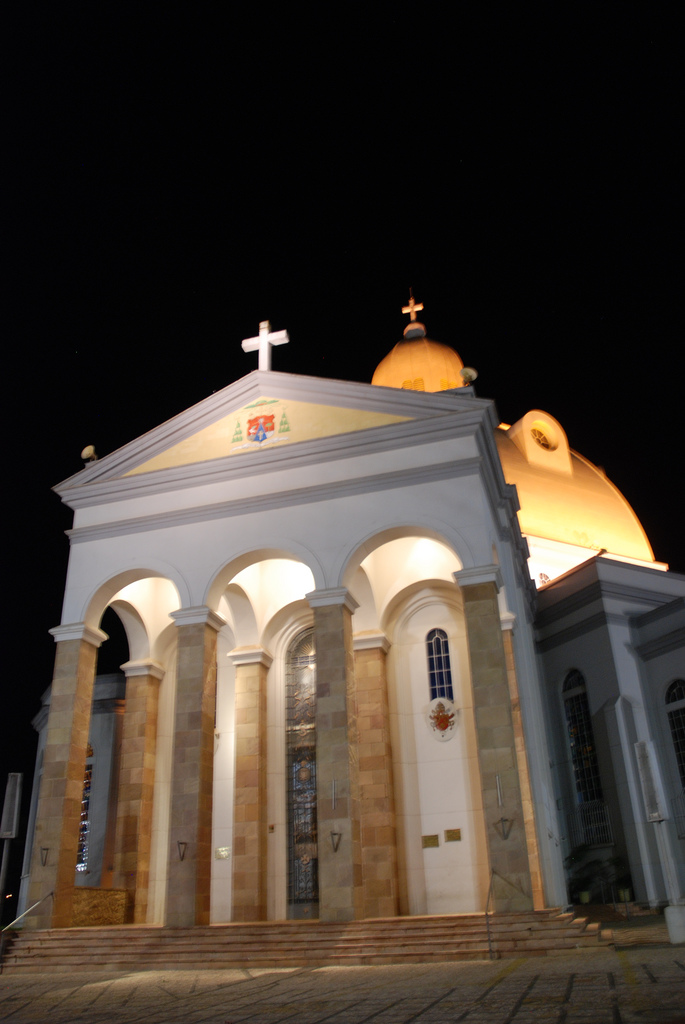
Another view of the building.

On November 13, 1948, a decree signed in Rome authorized the demolition of the old cathedral and allowed the use of the chapel of the St. Charles Diocesan Seminary as a temporary cathedral. The project was designed by engineer Emanuel Gianni, using a model by professor Ernfrid Frick and a structural design by engineer Lafael Petroni. It included stained glass windows by Lorenz Heilmair, altars in Carrara marble and the Way of the Cross executed by local artist Almira Ragonesi Bruno. The image of Saint Charles Borromeo with his head and hands carved in wood, which dates from the founding of the city, stands in the church.

Construction began on November 4, 1946, while the demolition of the old church occurred on July 9, 1949. The old clock was dismantled and donated to Saint Anthony of Padua Parish in 1955, where it remains today. The new cathedral was inaugurated in parts. On November 4, 1956, it reopened for public worship, although unfinished. Masses were celebrated in the first floor hall, while the main nave was under construction.

The chancel was inaugurated on April 4, 1962. On the same day, the first versus populum Mass was held in São Carlos, according to the new liturgical norms of the Second Vatican Council. Masses had previously been celebrated ad orientem. The floor of the entire church was laid in 1963. The main altar was consecrated on May 27, 1965 and the altar of the Blessed Sacrament on July 20 of the same year. The 200 pews were inaugurated in 1969. On December 8, 1970, the cathedral was consecrated. The liturgical act was presided over by Dom Ruy Serra and Dom José Aquino Pereira, Bishop of São José do Rio Preto.

On November 5, 2006, the church's new outdoor lighting was inaugurated using more than 270 spots of light. The project received 3rd place in the City People Light Award 2007, behind Heinsberg in Germany and Geneva in Switzerland. The church is surrounded by important buildings in the city, such as the Conde do Pinhal Palace and the Municipal Library.

== Gallery ==
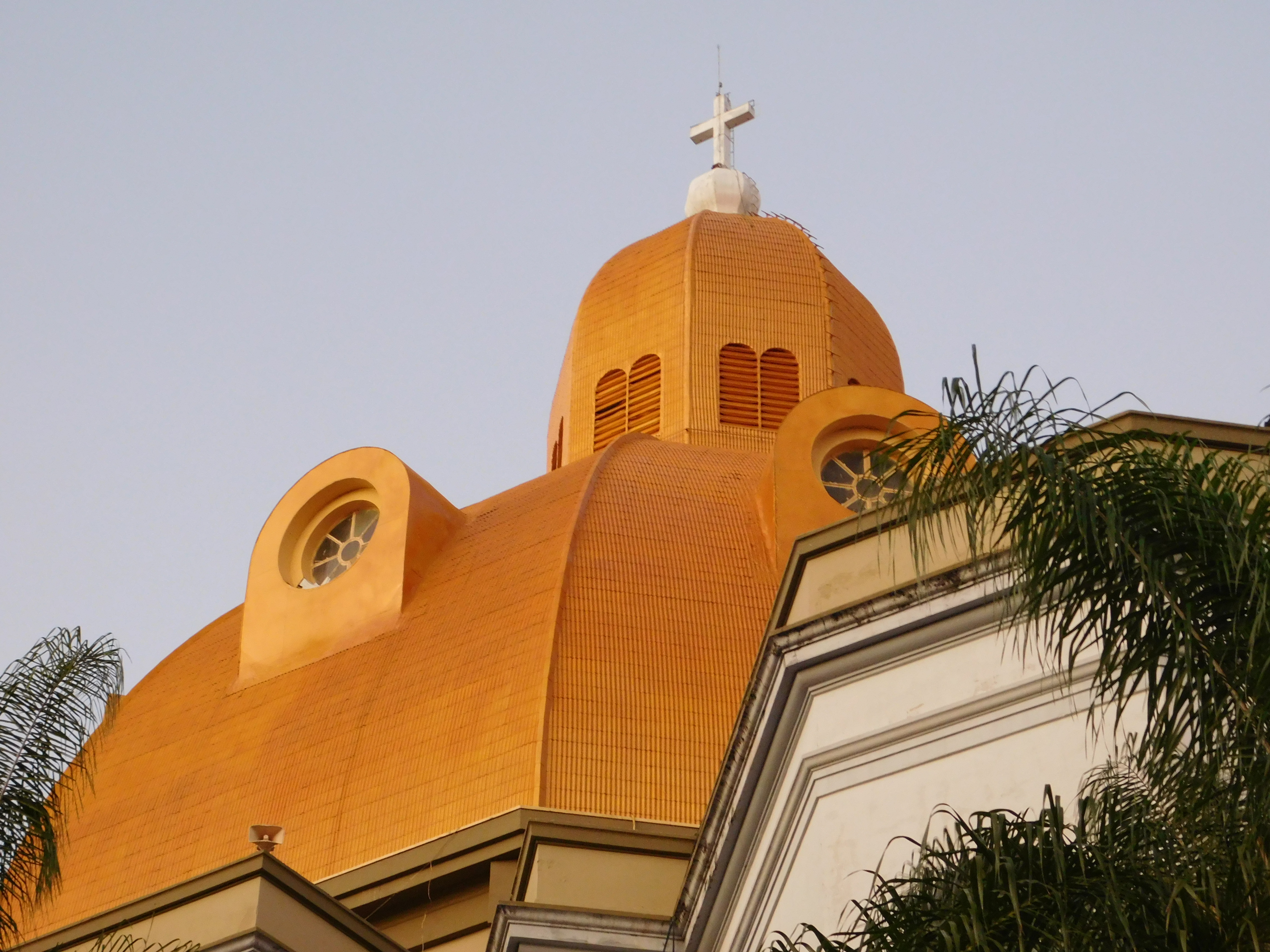
View of the dome.

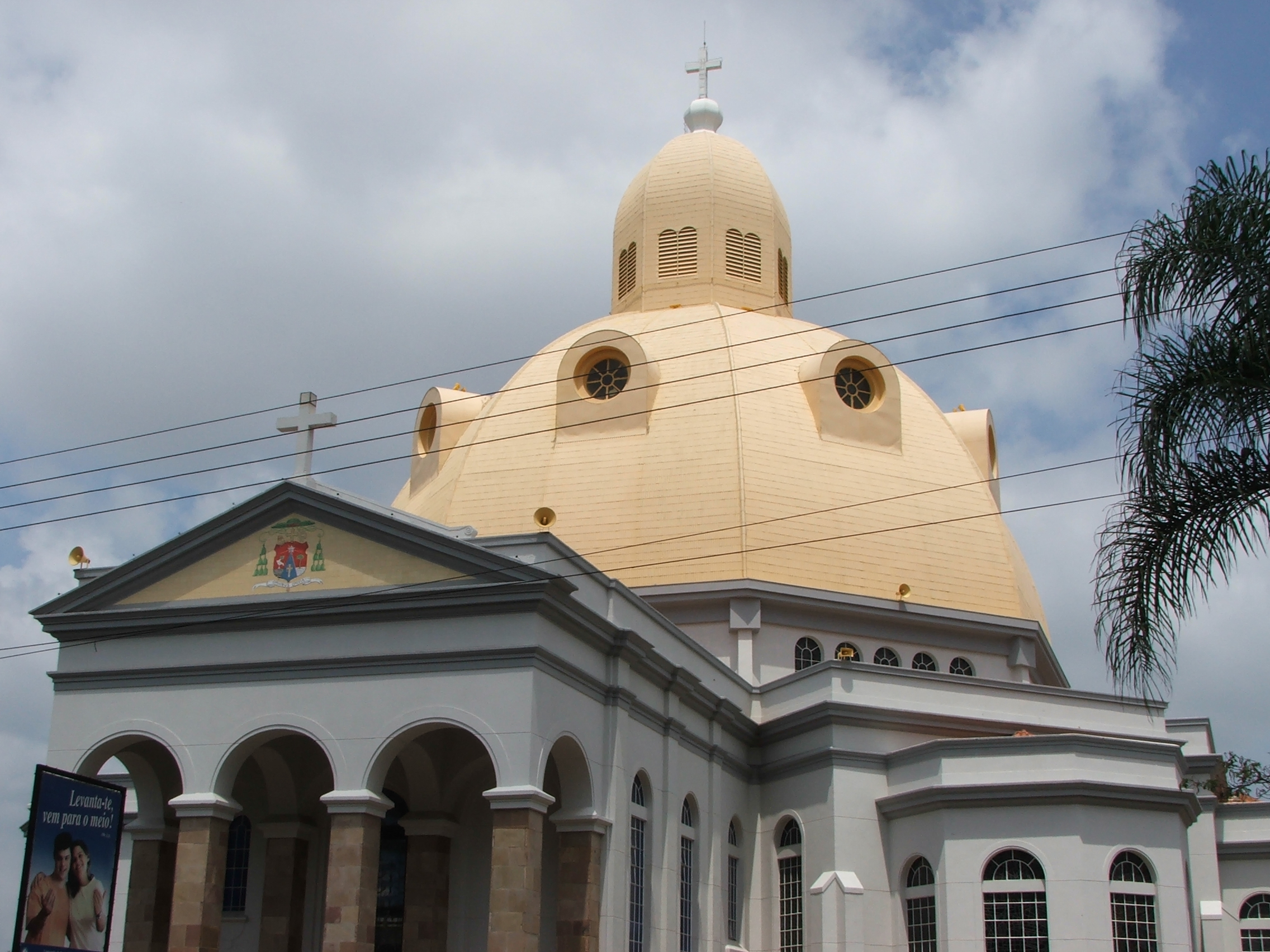
Upper facade.

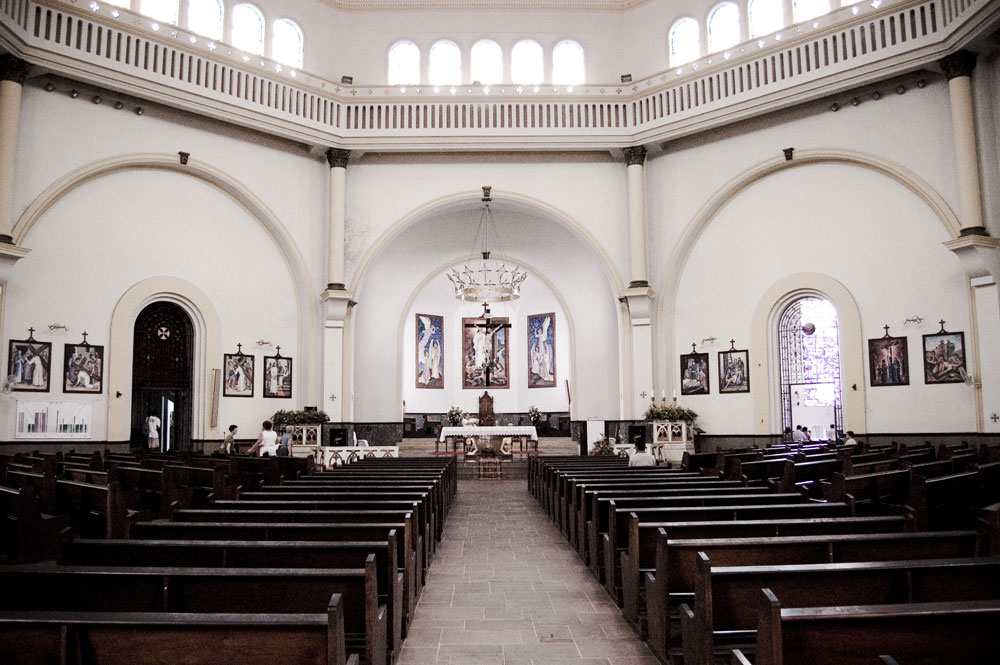
High altar in the center.

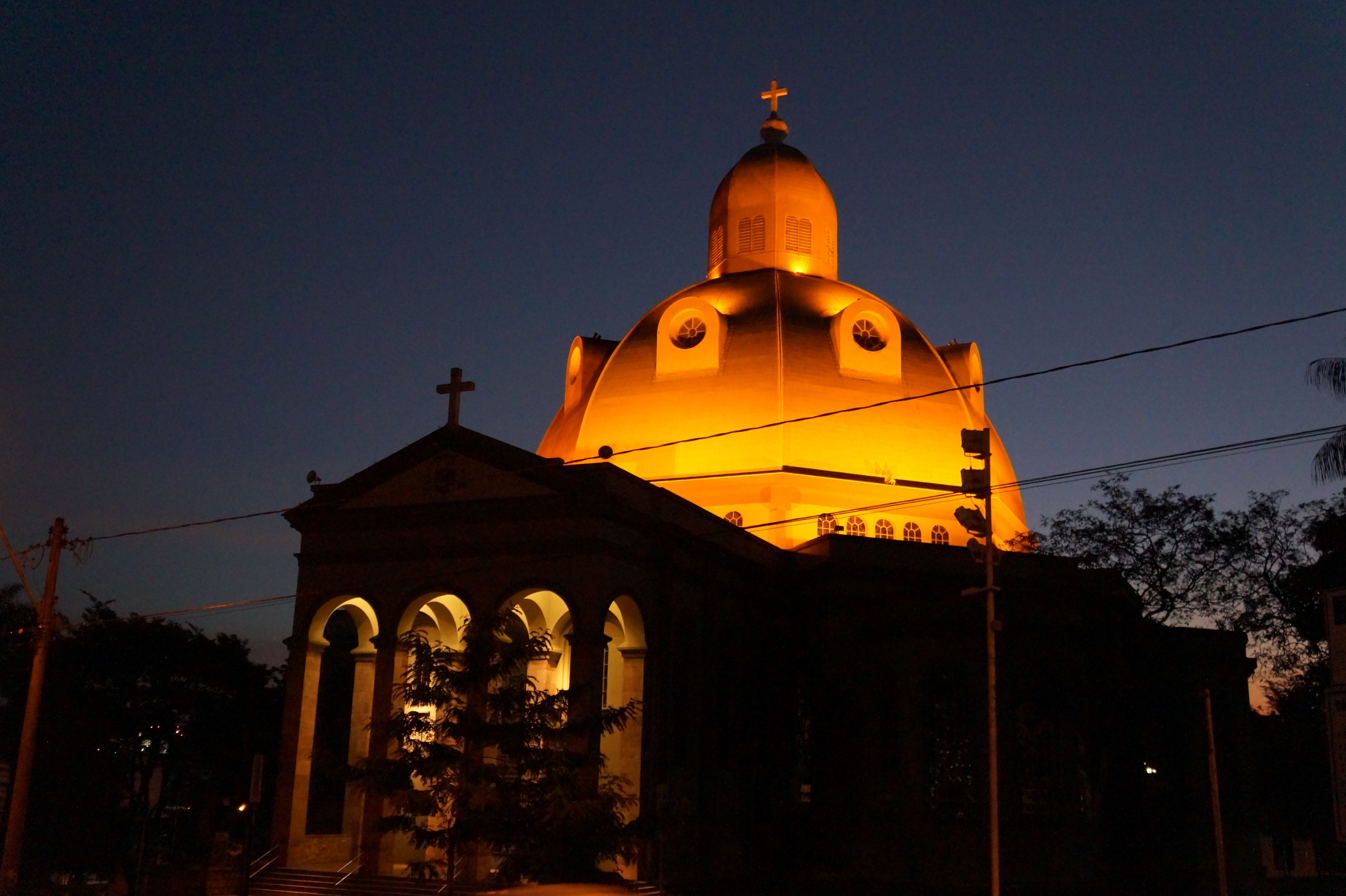
Night view.

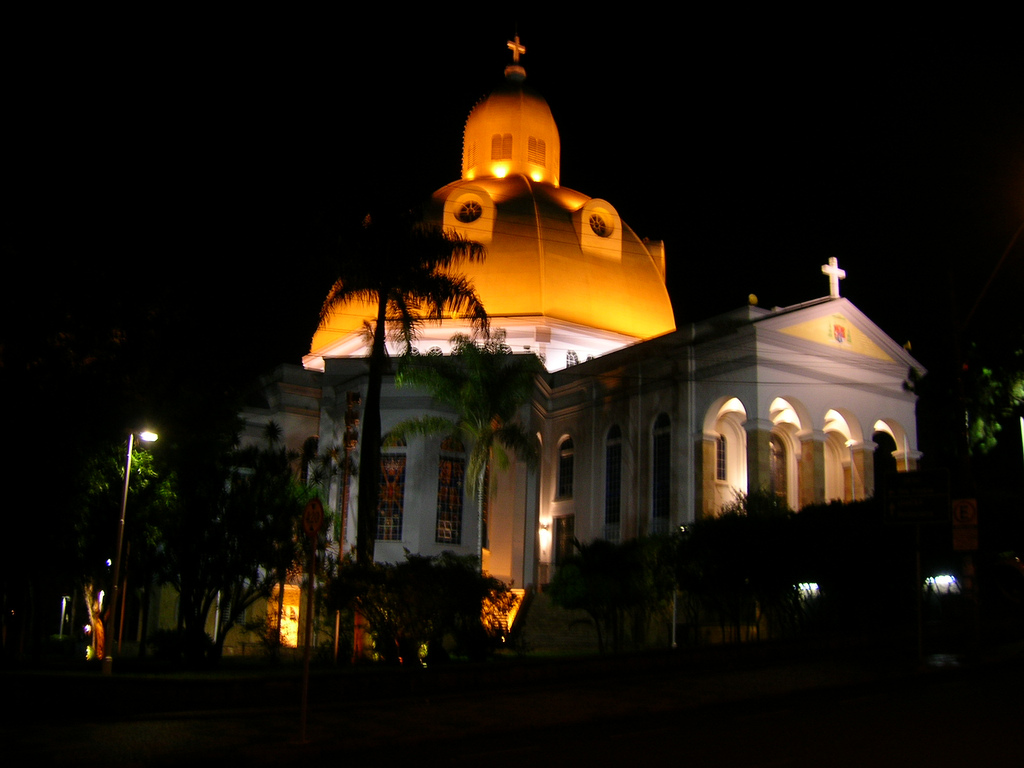
Night view from the side.

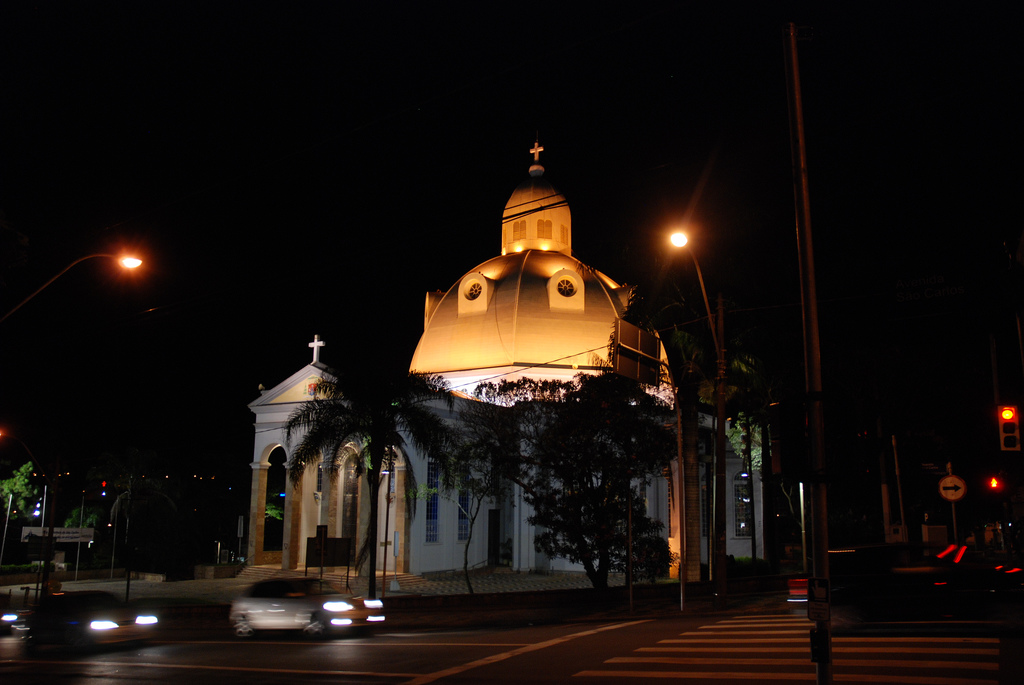
Facade of the cathedral

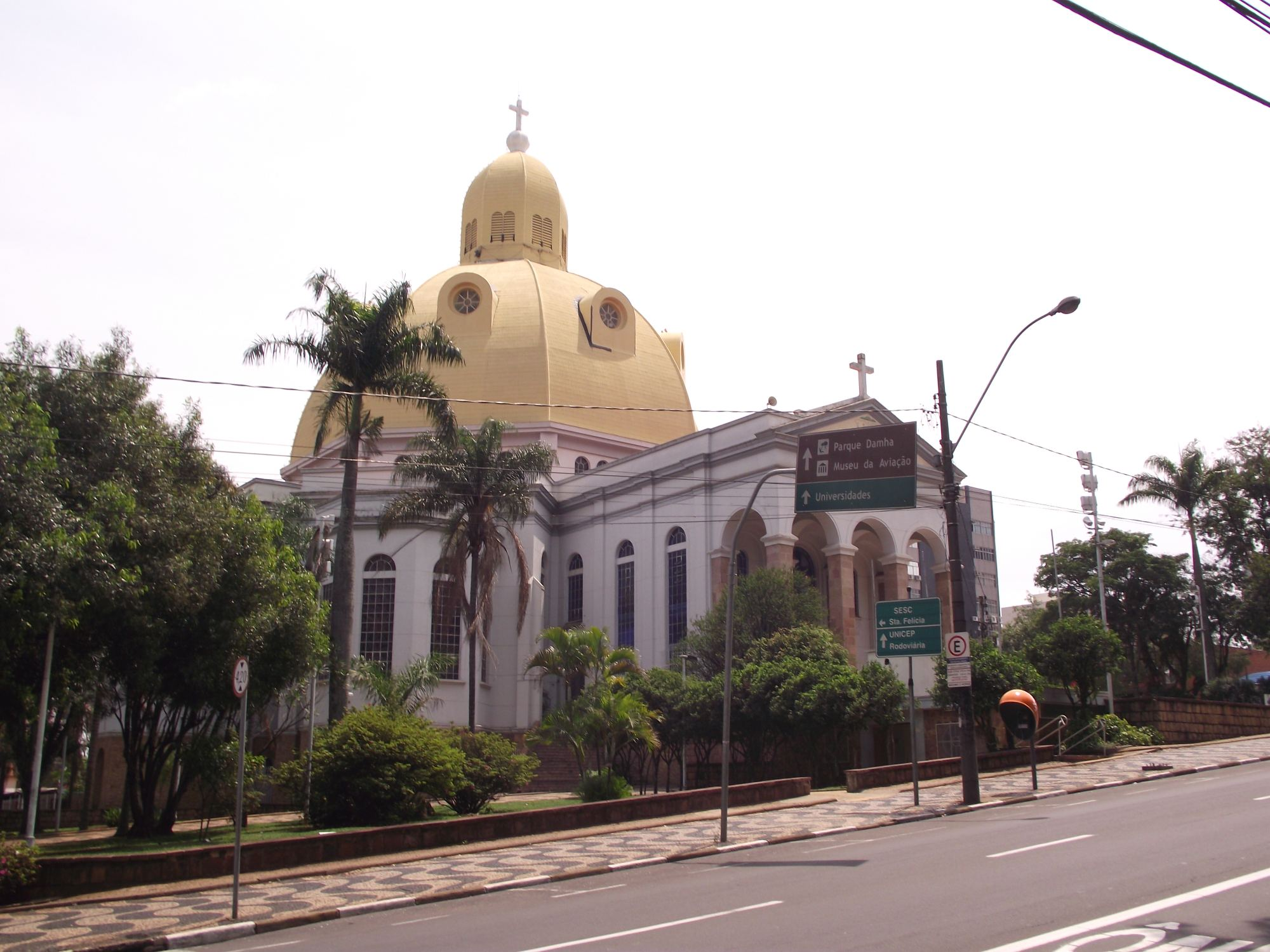
Front side view.

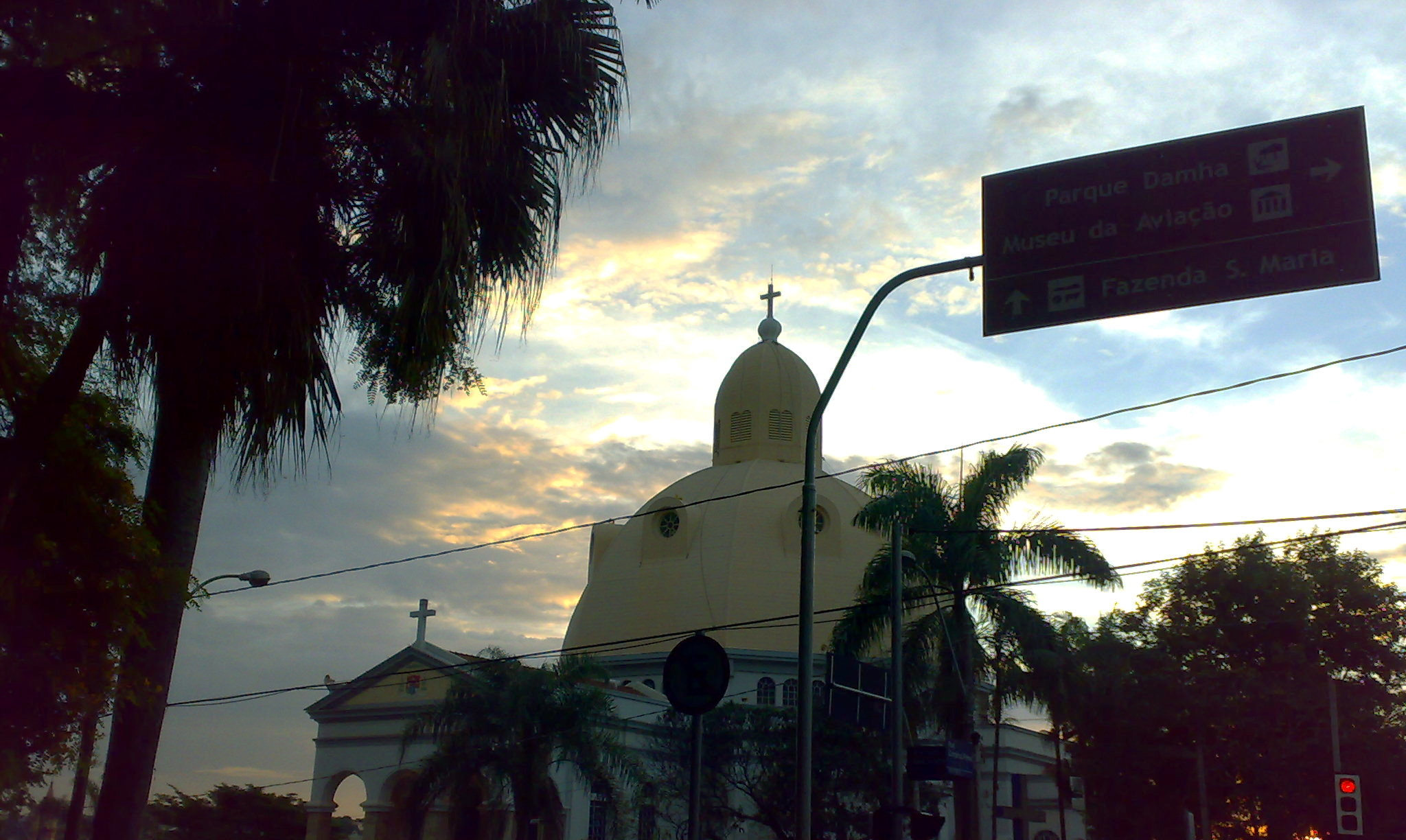
Cathedral at sunset.

== See also ==
- Roman Catholicism in Brazil
- St. Charles Borromeo
