= Universidad de San Carlos =

Universidad de San Carlos may refer to:

- Universidade Federal de São Carlos, in São Carlos, Brazil
- University of San Carlos of Guatemala, based in Guatemala City
- Universad de San Carlos (Guatemalan football club), based in Guatemala City and commonly known as USAC
- Universidad San Carlos (Paraguay), based in Asunción, Paraguay.
- University of San Carlos, in Cebu, Philippines
