= Paula Pedrosa =

Brazilian photographer and naturalist

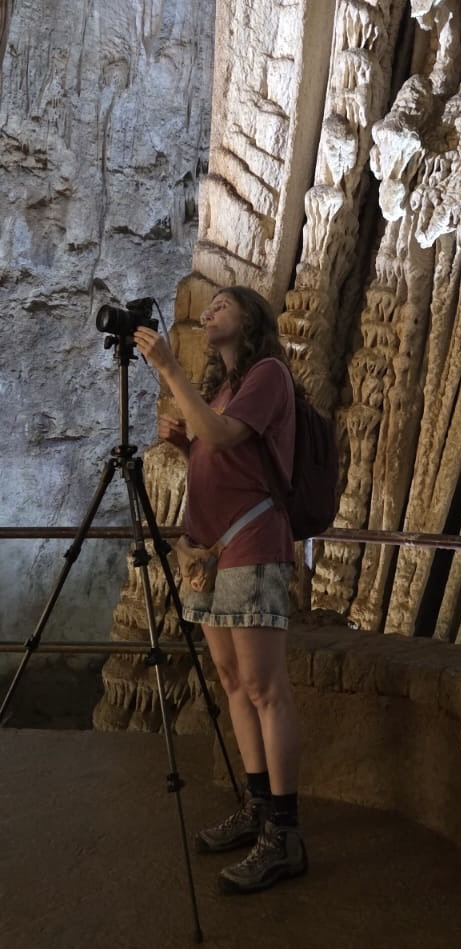
- Born: Paula Machado Pedrosa; 1978
- Education: Universidade Federal de São Carlos, National Institute of Amazonian Research
- Occupations: visual artist, naturalist, ecologist, photographer
- Known for: Photography
- Awards: Conrad Wessel Award, Nova Fotografia
- Website: https://pedpaula.com

Paula Machado Pedrosa (born 1978) is a Brazilian photographer and naturalist based in São Paulo. She is known for her exhibits that explores the tensions between natural and artificial, science and fiction and/or factual and imagined, one of which (Nunca Enganaremos) was awarded the 2022 FCW Photo Prize and the 2020 Nova Fotografia Prize.

== Awards and honours ==
- FCW Photo Prize (2022), winner.
- Nova Fotografia (2020), winner.
- Foto em Pauta (2018), shortlisted.

== Publications ==
- 2026: The Living Nature of the Stone Dead (or Nunca Enganaremos), as primary author.
- 2022: H is for Hemp, as photography editor and concept advisor.
- 2021: Embodied Forest, as contributing author.
- 2019: Diorama, as primary author.
