= Mata do Jacaré Ecological Station =

- Estação Ecológica Mata do Jacaré
- IUCN category Ia (strict nature reserve)
- Location within Brazil
- Nearest city: São Carlos, São Paulo
- Coordinates: 22°04′58″S 48°01′37″W
- Area: 75.26 hectares (186.0 acres)
- Designation: Ecological station
- Created: 12 March 1987

The Mata do Jacaré Ecological Station (Portuguese: Estação Ecológica Mata do Jacaré), formerly the São Carlos Ecological Station, is an ecological station in the state of São Paulo, Brazil. It preserves an isolated fragment of the Atlantic Forest biome, with semi-deciduous riparian vegetation.

== History ==
The Jacaré (Note: The Portuguese word Jacaré means "Alligator".) Forest (Mata do Jacaré) with an area of 75.26 hectares (186.0 acres) in the municipality of Brotas, São Paulo, was established by state decree 38.957 of 25 August 1961. This became the São Carlos Ecological Station (Portuguese: Estação Ecológica de São Carlos} by state decree 26.890 of 12 March 1987. A 2002 federal decree said the name of a conservation unit should where possible be based on its most significant natural feature or its oldest name, so it became the Estação Ecológica Mata do Jacaré by state decree 53.237 of 20 July 2012. It is administered by the Forestry Institute of the state environmental secretariat.

The unit lies along the south shore of the reservoir formed by the Santana Dam on the Jacaré-Guaçu River, which separates the municipalities of Brotas and São Carlos. The area is hilly and includes steep slopes susceptible to erosion. Altitudes range from 600 to 692 metres (1,969 to 2,270 ft). It drains into the 74.80 hectares (184.8 acres) Santana reservoir.

== Environment ==
The Mata do Jacaré has typical seasonal semi-deciduous forest vegetation of the Atlantic Forest biome, one of the last fragments of such forest in the São Carlos region. The unit has riparian vegetation. It is an isolated fragment surrounded by sugar cane fields. A 2002 study found only 145 species of birds, with a low incidence of endangered species. This appeared to be due to the small size and isolation of the unit. An extension of protection around the area has been proposed both to conserve biodiversity and to maintain the water quality of the reservoir.

== Sources ==
- Didier David Pozza (2002), COMPOSIÇÃO DA AVIFAUNA DA ESTAÇÃO ECOLÓGICA DE SÃO CARLOS (BROTAS-SP) E RESERVA AMBIENTAL DA FAZENDA SANTA CECÍLIA (PATROCINIO PAULISTA) (in Portuguese), Universidade Federal de São Carlos
- Estação Ecológica de São Carlos (in Portuguese), Via Rural, archived from the original on January 18, 2013
- Feliciano, Ana Lícia Patriota; Santos, José Eduardo dos; Pires, José Salatiel Rodrigues; Cavalheiro, Felisberto; Moschini, Luiz Eduardo, CARACTERIZAÇÃO AMBIENTAL E PROPOSTA PRELIMINAR DE ZONEAMENTO DE UMA UNIDADE DE CONSERVAÇÃO..., archived from the original on 2009-12-01
- Geraldo Alckmin (20 July 2012), Decreto Nº 58.237, de 20 de Julho de 2012 (in Portuguese)
