= São Carlos railroad station =

Former railway station in Jundiaí, Brazil

São Carlos station Estação Ferroviária de São Carlos
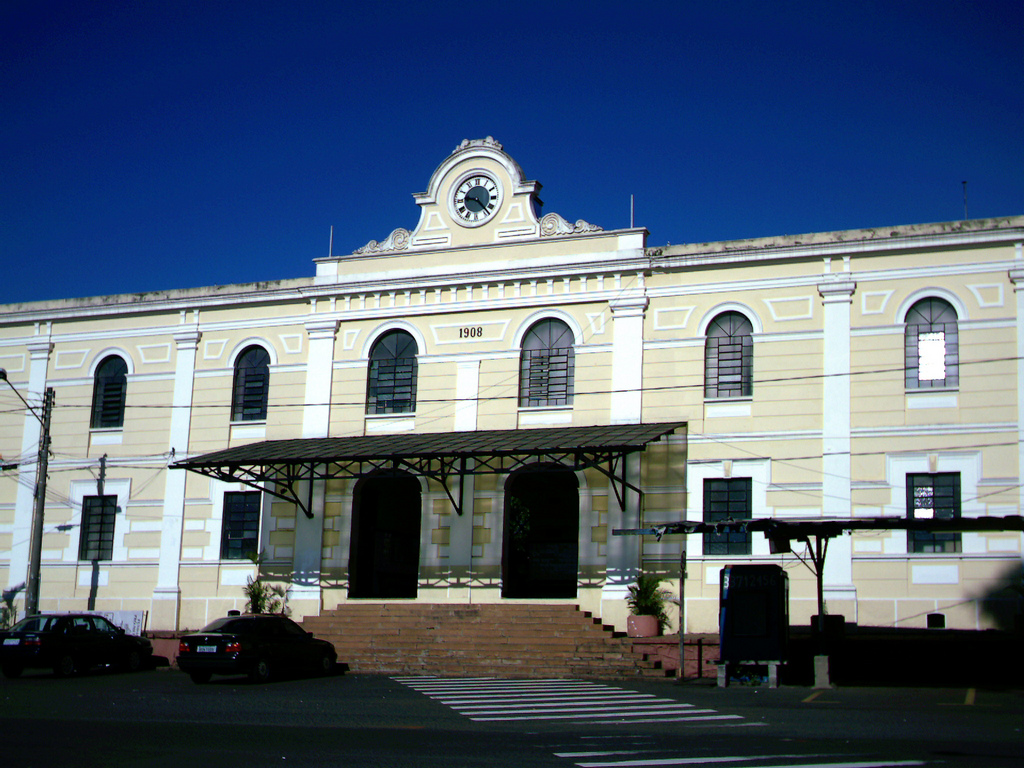
- Partial view of the Station's façade

General information
- Other names: Estação Cultura
- Location: Praça Antonio Prado, s/nº, São Carlos, SP
- Coordinates: 22°1′23″S 47°53′44″W
- Manager: City of São Carlos
- Lines: Trunk line (Jundiaí-Colômbia), line 1 of Companhia Paulista de Estradas de Ferro

Other information
- Status: Currently houses the Museum of São Carlos (Fundação Pro-Memória de São Carlos)
- Station code: SP-1208

History
- Opened: 1884 and 1912
- Closed: 15 March 2001
Location

The Estação Ferroviária de São Carlos ("São Carlos Railroad Station"), better known as Estação de São Carlos ("São Carlos Station"), Estação da Fepasa ("Fepasa Station"), or Estação Cultura ("Culture Station"), is the old train station located in São Carlos, Brazil. It is on the list of assets of historical interest published in 2021 by the Pró-Memória Foundation of São Carlos (FPMSC).

The first São Carlos railroad station was built in 1884 by Rio Clarense (Rio Claro), which Companhia Paulista de Estradas de Ferro demolished to build the current one, inaugurated in 1912.

== History ==
The original station, inaugurated in 1884, was built by Rio Clarense, that belonged to Major Benedito Antonio da Silva and the family Arruda Botelho of the Count of Pinhal.

When Companhia Paulista de Estradas de Ferro bought it from Rio Clarense in 1892, it demolished the station and built a bigger one in 1908 which was inaugurated in 1912. This was done to accommodate the great movement from the construction of two branches; the branch of Ribeirão Bonito (from São Carlos to Novo Horizonte) inaugurated in 1894 and deactivated in 1969; and the branch of Água Vermelha (from São Carlos to Santa Eudóxia) inaugurated in 1893 and deactivated in 1965, which connected to the trunk line via the station. Today the trunk line is used for maneuvers and the passage of América Latina Logística S/A's (ALL) freight.

It is the largest and one of the most important stations of Companhia Paulista de Estradas de Ferro along with the Campinas station, having a 250-meter long platform, 160 meters of which are in a covered area with a metallic structure.

It served as a railway station until March 15, 2001, when the last passenger train to Araraquara left. Since July 2003, with the complete deactivation of FEPASA, it became home to a cultural center, managed by the city hall.

== Architecture ==
The original building had a façade of exposed bricks, influenced by the English who built the railroad. In 1908, three Italian brothers, Abel, Séttimo, and Bruno Giongo remodeled the building, enlarging the upper floor and elaborating eclectic ornaments. The project was of the Companhia Rio Clarense, together with the Giongo brothers. Besides the station, the complex included old warehouses (to the northwest, in exposed masonry, from 1895) and maintenance workshops (to the south, demolished). To the north, there was also the CIAR Forgery, demolished in the 1960s for the construction of the Quatro de Novembro viaduct. About a dozen other stations were built in the municipality. The São Carlos station operated until 2001 when passenger transport came to an end.

The building is located within the Historic Polygon, with its main façade facing north. It was built in 1884, and reopened in 1908, in an Eclectic style, for Institutional use. It is well preserved. In the 2000s, it became home to the Museum of São Carlos and the Pró-Memória Foundation.

Eclecticism arrived in the city of São Carlos due to the wealth from the coffee cycle and the construction of the railroad, starting in 1884. It was a period of urban expansion in the city. Besides this, a great number of immigrant workers brought with them knowledge of European construction methods, which were being incorporated into the local building practices. Eclectic-style buildings were a symbol of social status.

== Property of Historical Interest ==
Between 2002 and 2003, the Pró-Memória Foundation (FPMSC), a municipal public agency responsible for "preserving and disseminating the historical and cultural heritage of the city of São Carlos", conducted the first survey (not published) of the "real estate of historic interest" of the city of São Carlos, covering 160 blocks and analyzing more than 3,000 properties. Of these, 1,410 had original architecture from the end of the XIX century and 150 preserved their original characteristics, 479 had significant changes, and 817 were uncharacterized. The names of the categories of buildings on the list have changed over the years. São Carlos station is a "listed building" (category 1) in the inventory of heritage assets of the city of São Carlos, published in 2021 by the foundation. This heritage designation was published in the Government Gazette of the municipality on March 9, 2021. It is part of the historic polygon delimited by the Pró-Memória Foundation, which "comprises the urban network of São Carlos from the 1940s". This is on a map published on its website, where there is an indication of the assets in the process of being protected or already protected by Condephaat (State agency), and assets protected in the municipal sphere (by FPMSC).

== Cultural significance ==
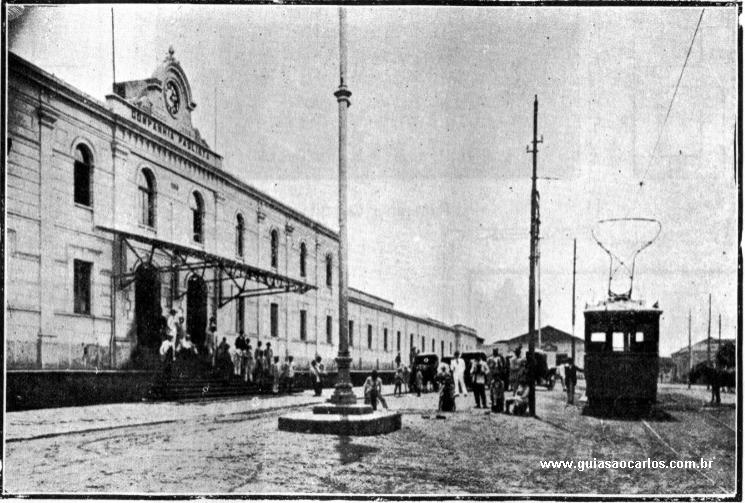
View of the station and the tram in 1918

The Pró-Memória Foundation of São Carlos, also bearing the name Estação Cultura ("Culture Station") (a name given in 2001), has three units; São Carlos' Historical and Public Archive, Historical and Architectural Patrimony, and Research and Dissemination. Besides these, a Maria Fumaça (a Baldwin 4-4-0 locomotive) was restored in 2012 and is displayed in the complex.

The station and the foundation are open to public visitation, and there are meetings of old railroad workers, nostalgic individuals, and enthusiasts as well as an exhibition of model railroads.

On August 30, 2008, the 12th Frateschi Model Railroads Convention took place. More than two thousand people were present at the event, including model railway enthusiasts and business people from Brazil and South America. Ten models were exhibited and about 200 models enrolled for the competition. The event happened on the centenary of the station's renovation work (1908-2008).

Once again São Carlos was chosen to host the 13th Frateschi Ferromodeling Convention, which took place on August 22, 2009, considered one of the largest events of its kind in Latin America.

== Benedito Calixto in the Land of Pinhal ==
Benedito Calixto in the Land of Pinhal ("Benedito Calixto na Terra do Pinhal") is a permanent exhibition, open to the general public, at the Museum of the Estação Cultura.

The exhibition shows a wide panorama of the life and work of the celebrated Brazilian painter, and eight frescoes, original works made by him for the former Episcopal Palace of São Carlos, that now belong to the collection of the São Carlos municipality.
