= Dr. Álvaro Guião State School =

Secondary school in São Paulo, Brazil

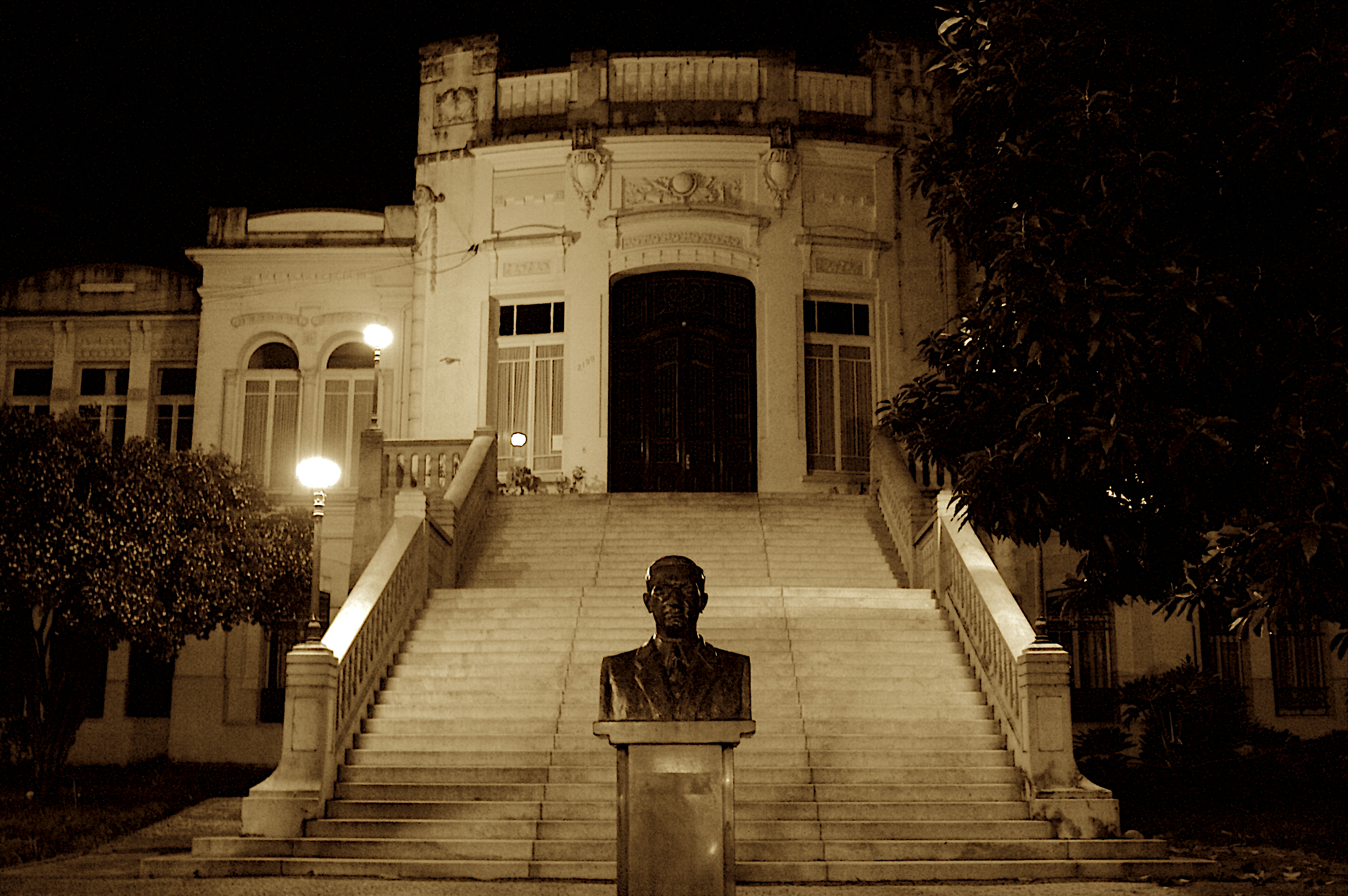
Dr. Álvaro Guião State School at night

Dr. Álvaro Guião State School (Portuguese: Escola Estadual Doutor Álvaro Guião) is a secondary school in São Carlos, São Paulo, Brazil. It was founded in 1911.
