= Carlos Botelho (politician) =

Brazilian Politician

Carlos José de Arruda Botelho (14 May 1855 - 20 March 1947), more commonly known as Carlos Botelho, was a Brazilian politician and urologist.

== Early life ==
Botelho was born in Piracicaba on 14 May 1855 to Conde do Pinhal and Francisca Teodora Coelho. His father was a Brazilian federal deputy.

== Education ==
In 1867, Botelho completed his first studies at the Pátio do Colégio, a traditional Jesuit college in Itu, São Paulo. He subsequently studied at the Faculty of Medicine in Rio de Janeiro and received his Doctorate of Medicine in 1878 from the University of Paris, France.

== Medical career ==
Botelho began working at the Santa Casa de Misericórdia, serving as its first Clinical Director from 1891 to 1894. He co-founded the São Paulo Academy of Medicine in 1895 and became its second President from 1896 to 1897. As the owner of São Paulo's first private medical practice, he was among the first urologists to practise in Brazil.

He was a founding member of the First Brazilian Congress of Medicine and Surgery in Rio de Janeiro.

== Political career ==
He served as the Secretary of Agriculture of São Paulo and later as a Senator of the Republic. He has been called "the Patron Saint of Japanese Immigration in Brazil" for having signed the contract for the arrival of the first Japanese immigrants to Brazil in 1908 during the government of Jorge Tibiriçá.

== Personal life ==
After completing his studies in 1867, he married Constança de Brito Souza Filgueiras in Rio de Janeiro.

On 20 March 1947, he died at Pinhal Farm, in São Carlos, at the age of 92.
