= Estádio Paulista =

Soccer stadium in Brazil

Coordinates: 22.009435°S 47.892929°W

Paulista Stadium
- Paulista
- Interactive map of Paulista Stadium
- Full name: Estádio Paulista
- Location: São Carlos, São Paulo, Brazil
- Owner: São Carlos Clube
- Operator: São Carlos Clube
- Capacity: 2,000
- Surface: Natural grass
- Record attendance: 9,000
- Field size: 103 by 67 metres (112.6 yd × 73.3 yd)

Construction
- Built: 1921
- Opened: April 21, 1921
- Renovated: 1956 and 1964
- Expanded: 1966 and 1967
- Structural engineer: Lafael Petroni - 1956/7

Tenant
- São Carlos Clube

Estádio Paulista, usually known as Estádio Paulista, or just Paulista, is a football (soccer) stadium in São Carlos, São Paulo, Brazil. The stadium has a maximum capacity of 4,000. It was inaugurated in 1921. The stadium is owned by the São Carlos City Hall, and its formal name honors Paulista Esporte Clube. Incorporated in 1951 by São Carlos Clube. São Carlos Clube usually plays their home matches at the stadium, and has a pitch size of 103 x 67 m.

== History ==
The inaugural match was played on April 21, 1921, when Paulista of Araraquara tied Paulista EC 2-2. The scorer of the first goal of the stadium is unknown.

The stadium's attendance record currently stands at 9,000 people, set on August 7, 1966 when São Carlos Clube and Palmeiras 4-4.

On February 27, 1966, the stadium lighting was inaugurated. Ferroviária beat São Carlos Clube 2–0 in the lighting inaugural match.
