= Monjolinho River =

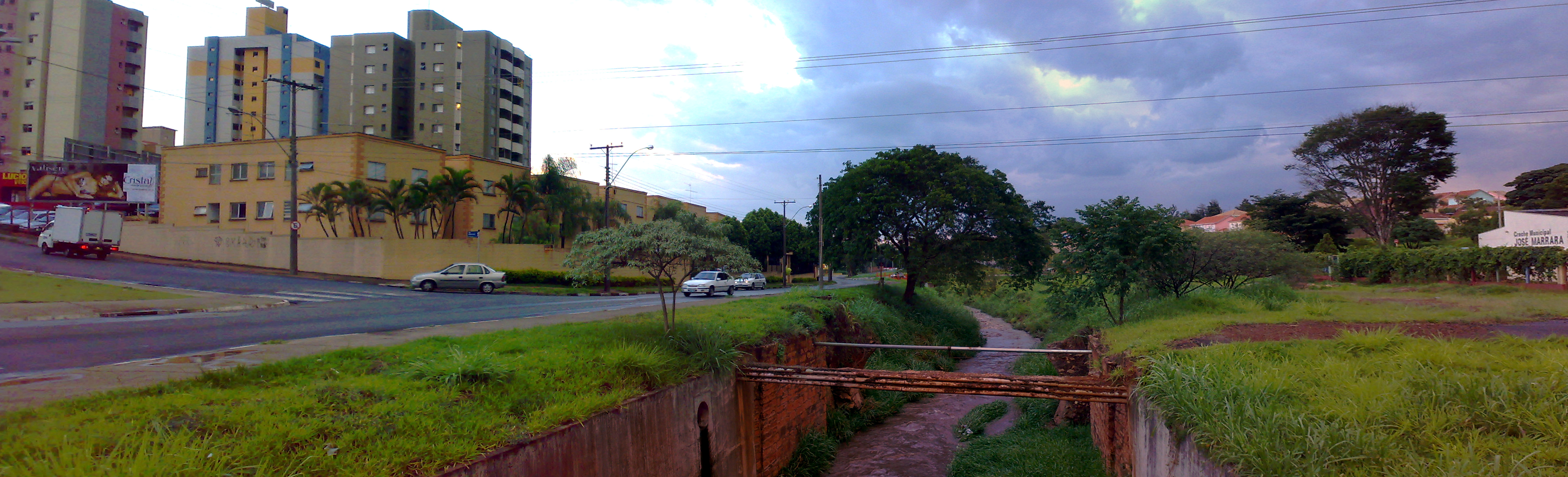

Location
- Country: Brazil

Physical characteristics
- Source
  - location: São Paulo state
- Mouth: Jacaré-Guaçu River
  - coordinates: 26°8′S 49°22′W

The Monjolinho River is a river of São Paulo state in southeastern Brazil.

== See also ==
- List of rivers of São Paulo
