= Gatti (footballer) =

Brazilian footballer (born 1984)

Personal information
- Full name: Rafael Savério Gatti
- Date of birth: September 5, 1984 (age 42)
- Place of birth: São Carlos, Brazil
- Height: 1.87 m (6 ft 2 in)
- Position: Goalkeeper

Youth career
- 2000–2003: Rio Branco-SP

Senior career*
Years	Team	Apps	(Gls)
2003–2009	Cruzeiro	7	(0)
2006–2007	→ Cabofriense (loan)		(0)
2008	→ Cabofriense (loan)		(0)
2009	→ Juventude (loan)	25	(0)
2010	Anapolina		
2010	ASA		
2010	Brasiliense	10	(0)
2011	Anapolina	19	(0)
2011–2012	Cuiabá	30	(0)
2013–2014	Volta Redonda	33	(0)
2014	Cuiabá	3	(0)
2015	Mirassol		(0)
2016	Guarani		(0)
2016–2017	Votuporanguense	15	(0)
- * Club domestic league appearances and goals

Rafael Savério Gatti, or Gatti (born in São Carlos on September 5, 1984), is a former Brazilian football goalkeeper.

== Career ==
Stood to defend the Cabofriense during the Carioca championship in 2007, being voted best goalkeeper of the competition. Cabofriense (Loan) 5 December 2008 to 31 December 2008. Cruzeiro 1 January 2007 to 31 March 2009.

In 2013, Gatti hits with Volta Redonda to the Dispute and the Carioca Championship Season 2013.

== Honours ==
- Campeonato Mineiro: 2004

== Personal honours ==
- Best goalkeeper of the Campeonato Carioca: 2007
