= Torrinha =

- Municipality
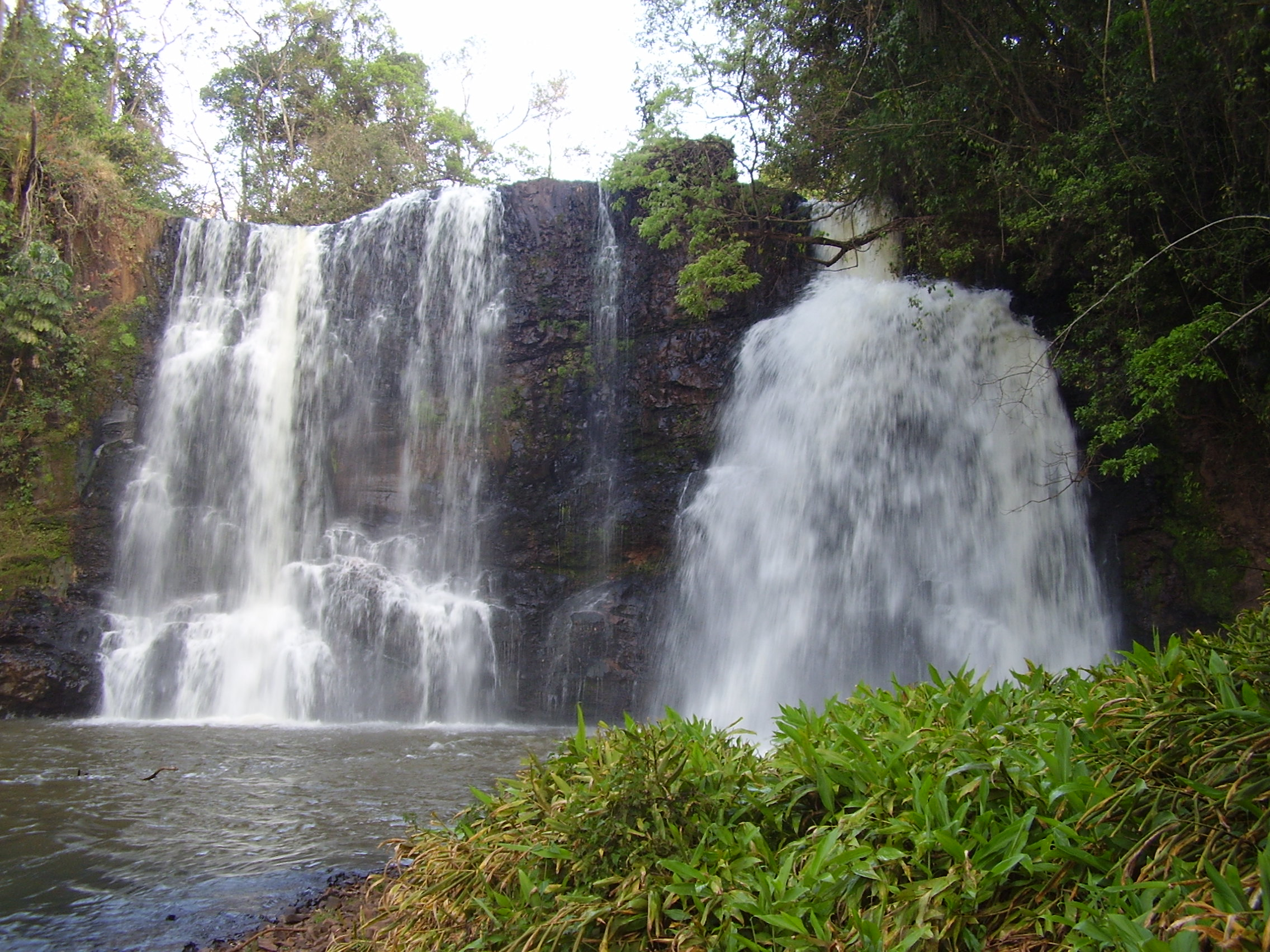

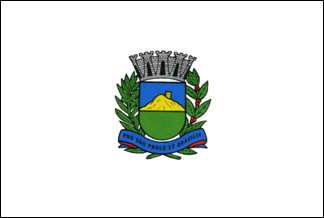
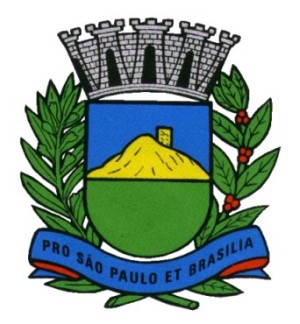
- Flag Coat of arms

- Location in São Paulo state

- Location in Brazil
- Coordinates: 22°25′34″S 48°10′9″W
- Country: Brazil
- Region: Southeast
- State: São Paulo

Area
  - Total: 315 km^{2} (122 sq mi)

Population (2015)
  - Total: 9,846
  - Density: 31.3/km^{2} (81.0/sq mi)
- Time zone: UTC−3 (BRT)

Torrinha is a municipality in the state of São Paulo in Brazil. The population is 9,846 (2015 est.) in an area of 315 km^{2} (122 sq mi). The elevation is 802 m.

== History ==
The settlements where today the municipality of Torrinha is located have been shaped by colonization. In the 17th and 18th centuries this portion of the Sao Paulo area was cleared by tropeiros and travellers who landed in search of wealth. With the need for supplies, services, and repairs, fledgling businesses emerged, enabling the establishment of populated areas. This process of occupation intensified with the donation of Sesmarias, which outlined the major farms and future urban areas. The Land Law of 1850 encouraged small farmers from nearby regions to establish themselves in the small village.

Some families have lived in Torrinha since 1850. Some of these pioneering family names include: Fonseca Costa, Mello, Dias, Ferreira, Ferraz, Gomes, Ribeiro del Prado, Dias Ramos, Carvalho, Franco de Moraes, Souza, Barros, Teixeira, Milk, Marques, Paiva, France, Pinto, Melchert, Barbosa and Bueno.

Jose Antunes de Oliveira is considered the founder of Torrinha, who donated to the Bishopric of Sao Paulo a small area where a chapel was built in honor of San Jose, considered the patron saint of the city. This was around 1870, nineteen years before the Republic.

In 1880, documents record the arrival of Jerome Martins Coelho, grandson of Lord of Cocais, coming from the edge of Mata, Minas Gerais. He acquired large amounts of land that reached the localities of Santa Maria da Serra, Torrinha, Brotas, and Two Streams. He settled for a long time in lands where today is the Plant of the Three Falls, and built on his farm one of the first Presbyterian Churches of the State.

During this period the population grew steadily. With the arrival in 1886 of Bento Lacerda, the son of the Baron de Araras, Benedict Lacerda Guimaraes and Dona Manuela Franco, the little village gains momentum. Bento Lacerda had just returned home from Germany, where he had studied at the Polytechnic University of Hannover, specializing in chemistry and mining. He accepted the challenge and come and work on the land purchased by the Baron. The creation of the District Police in 1892 and District of Peace in 1896 is attributed to him.

The economic development of this region increased around the 19th century with the introduction of sugar plantations. Torrinha was close to the sugar farming areas of Piracicaba, Araraquara and San Carlos. Sugarcane production spurred the settlement, encouraging the arrival of immigrants. However, local conditions proved unfavorable and the area turned to coffee growing.

The coffee culture and its development is associated with the construction of the railway. The station of Santa Maria, later Torrinha, was inaugurated on September 7, 1886, by Paulista de Estradas de Ferrounder. The station was a major impetus in the development of the city that needed a means of shipping its main agricultural product, coffee. It also provided easier access for immigration and travel.

== Geography ==
Large mountainous areas consisting of basalt and sandstone lie within the perimeter of Torrinha, along with 34 other canyons. The potential for tourism associated with this geological feature is indisputable, with walls up to 100 feet tall, beautiful waterfalls, and caves of sandstone and basalt. A gallery forest and well-preserved primary hillsides can be found in narrow valleys still unexplored.

Torrinha is part of the western Sao Paulo plateau, which includes the geotectonic unit called Paraná Basin, where accumulation of thick sedimentary masses and basaltic volcanic eruptions occurred in the Tertiary period (Cenozoic Age – between 70 and 12 million years). This caused underground tectonic and erosive processes; hence the emerging festooned-scarp relief called "cuestas" (Spanish: Encuestas) arranged in arcs towards the Brazilian Highlands, which encompasses the "Torrinha" rock as well.

The municipality also has about 5% of its original native vegetation preserved. Of this total, almost all is composed of vegetation on slopes. Savannah and broad-leaved tropical forest species still exist in small isolated areas, although they have been almost completely decimated due to agriculture and stock breeding. The presence of numerous rock walls and slopes that sprang from the "cuestas", primarily an "embarrassment" for the settlers from the beginning of the 20th century, preserved this natural and important sanctuary treasure for biodiversity in the state of Sao Paulo.

== Media ==
In telecommunications, the city was served by Companhia Telefônica Brasileira until 1973, when it began to be served by Telecomunicações de São Paulo. In July 1998, this company was acquired by Telefónica, which adopted the Vivo brand in 2012.

The company is currently an operator of cell phones, fixed lines, internet (fiber optics/4G) and television (satellite and cable).

== See also ==
- List of municipalities in São Paulo
