= São Carlos, Santa Catarina =

Coordinates: 27.0775°S 53.0039°W

São Carlos
- Municipality
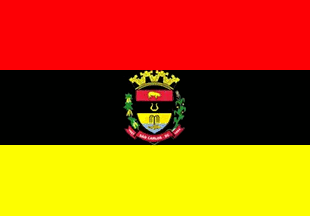
- Flag Coat of arms
- Interactive map of São Carlos
- Country: Brazil
- Region: South
- State: Santa Catarina
- Mesoregion: Oeste Catarinense

Population (2020)
  - Total: 11,369
- Time zone: UTC -3

São Carlos is a municipality in the state of Santa Catarina in the South region of Brazil.

== See also ==
- List of municipalities in Santa Catarina
