= Jacaré-Guaçu River =

- Jacaré-Guaçu River (Brazil)
- Native name: Rio Jacaré-Guaçu (Portuguese)

Location
- Country: Brazil
- State: São Paulo

Physical characteristics
- Mouth
  - coordinates: 21.848889°S 48.933056°W
- Basin size: 4161

Basin features
- River system: Tietê River
- Waterbodies: Santana Dam

The Jacaré-Guaçu River is a river of São Paulo state in southeastern Brazil. It flows into the Tietê River near Ibitinga.

The river separates the municipalities of Brotas and São Carlos. The Santana Dam creates a reservoir on the river covering 74.80 hectares (184.8 acres). The Mata do Jacaré Ecological Station lies along the south shore of the reservoir.

== See also ==
- List of rivers of São Paulo
