= Count of Pinhal Mansion =

Historical mansion in São Carlos, São Paulo, Brazil

- Palacete Conde do Pinhal
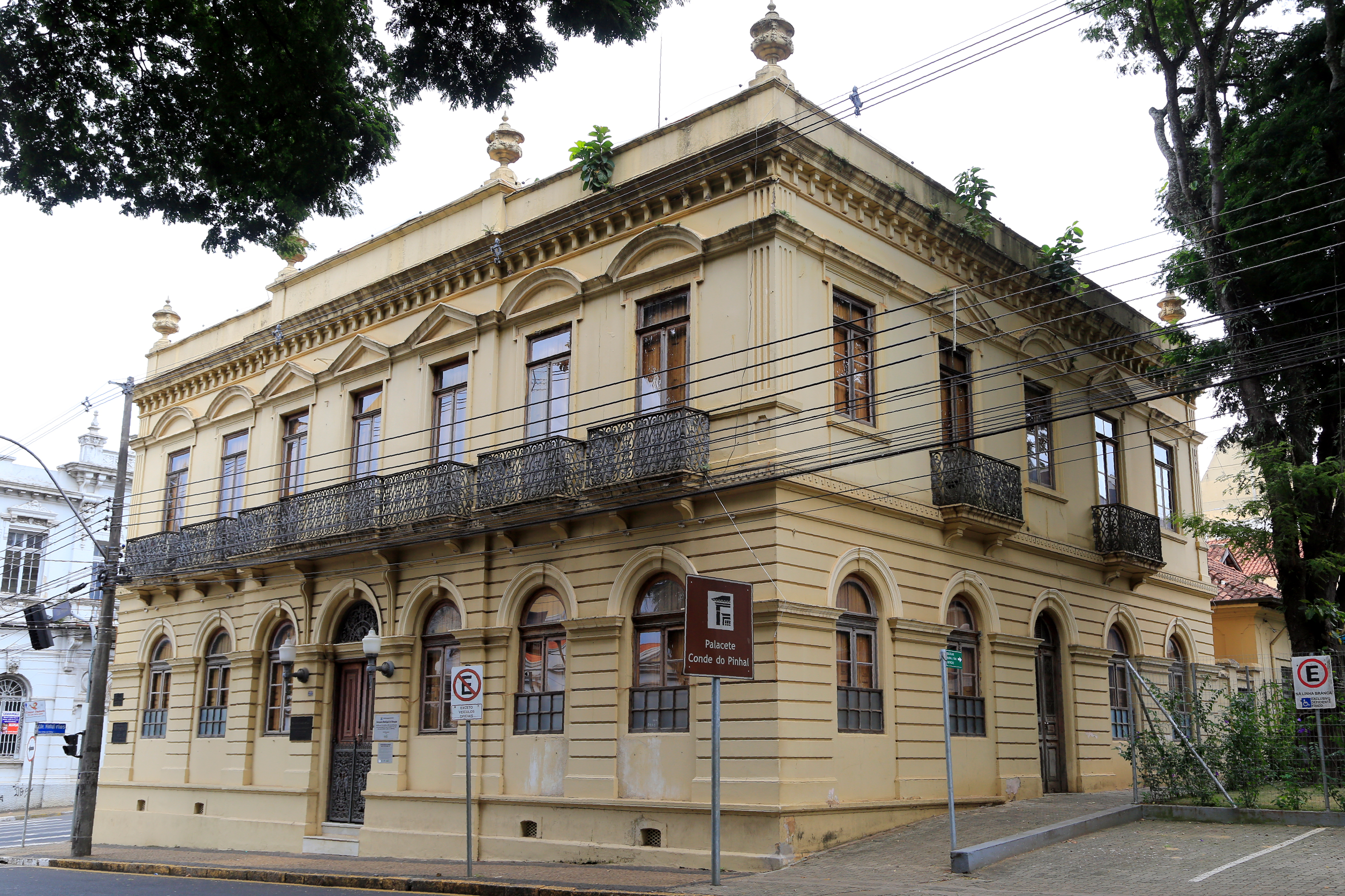
- Interactive map of the Count of Pinhal Mansion area

General information
- Architectural style: Eclectic, Neo-Renaissance
- Location: São Carlos, São Paulo, Brazil, 2017, Conde do Pinhal Street, São Carlos - SP
- Coordinates: 22°01′04″S 47°53′26″W
- Inaugurated: 1895

Count of Pinhal Mansion (Portuguese: Palacete Conde do Pinhal) is a historic building located in the city of São Carlos, Brazil. Listed by the Council for the Defense of Historical, Archaeological, Artistic and Tourist Heritage (CONDEPHAAT), it is currently home to departments of the Municipal Secretary of Education of São Carlos.

== History ==
The land was acquired in 1867, according to the year engraved on the property's iron gate. On December 27, 1890, the Count of Pinhal hired engineer Pietro David Cassinelli, who began construction of the building in 1893, and it was inaugurated in 1895.

[...] two factors contributed to his decision to build his palace in the city in 1887: the first was the use of the land he had acquired in 1867, comprising the streets of São Bento (now Conde do Pinhal), do Comércio (Avenida São Carlos), Jataí (Dona Alexandrina) and Municipal (Major José Inácio). The second factor was the arrival of the Imperial Family in the city of São Carlos at the end of that decade and their desire to have a residence to match their visitors. In addition, the bestowal of the title of Count of Pinhal on Antonio Carlos in 1887 further reinforced his personal importance, and the need for a residence in the city as a symbol of this distinction became even greater.

When the count died in 1901, the family stopped living there and the mansion was used by the Sisters of the Blessed Sacrament, who ran the Colégio São Carlos from 1906 to 1913. In 1918, the municipality took possession of the property. Between 1921 and 1952, the building was home to the town hall and the city council. From 1952 to 2008, it housed only the town hall. From 2008 to 2016, the building was home to the Secretary of Education — which then moved to Bento Carlos Mansion (2016-17), and Casa da Cultura (2017). The Count of Pinhal Mansion is currently closed and has no active use.

== Architecture ==
The building has an eclectic, neo-Renaissance style on its two floors, a request from the count himself, who wanted a residence similar to the Marquis of Três Rios mansion. The building has seven balconies on the main façade and two on the façade facing the garden, where a “guest chalet” is located, designed to accommodate visitors separately from the family's daily activities. The rest of the land still preserved a large wooded area, which was surrounded by rammed earth walls; and access to the grounds for the carriages and other maintenance services was via what is now Major José Inácio Street.

Eclecticism (Note: The term eclecticism denotes the combination of a single work of different historical styles without producing a new style. This method is based on the conviction that beauty or perfection can be achieved by selecting and combining the best qualities of the works of the great masters. It can also designate a more specific movement relating mainly to an architectural current of the 19th century.) arrived in the city of São Carlos due to the wealth of the coffee-growing period and the construction of the railroad in 1884. It was a period of urban expansion for the municipality. In addition, many immigrant workers brought with them knowledge of European construction methods, which were incorporated into local building practices. Eclectic-style buildings were a symbol of social status.

== The builder ==
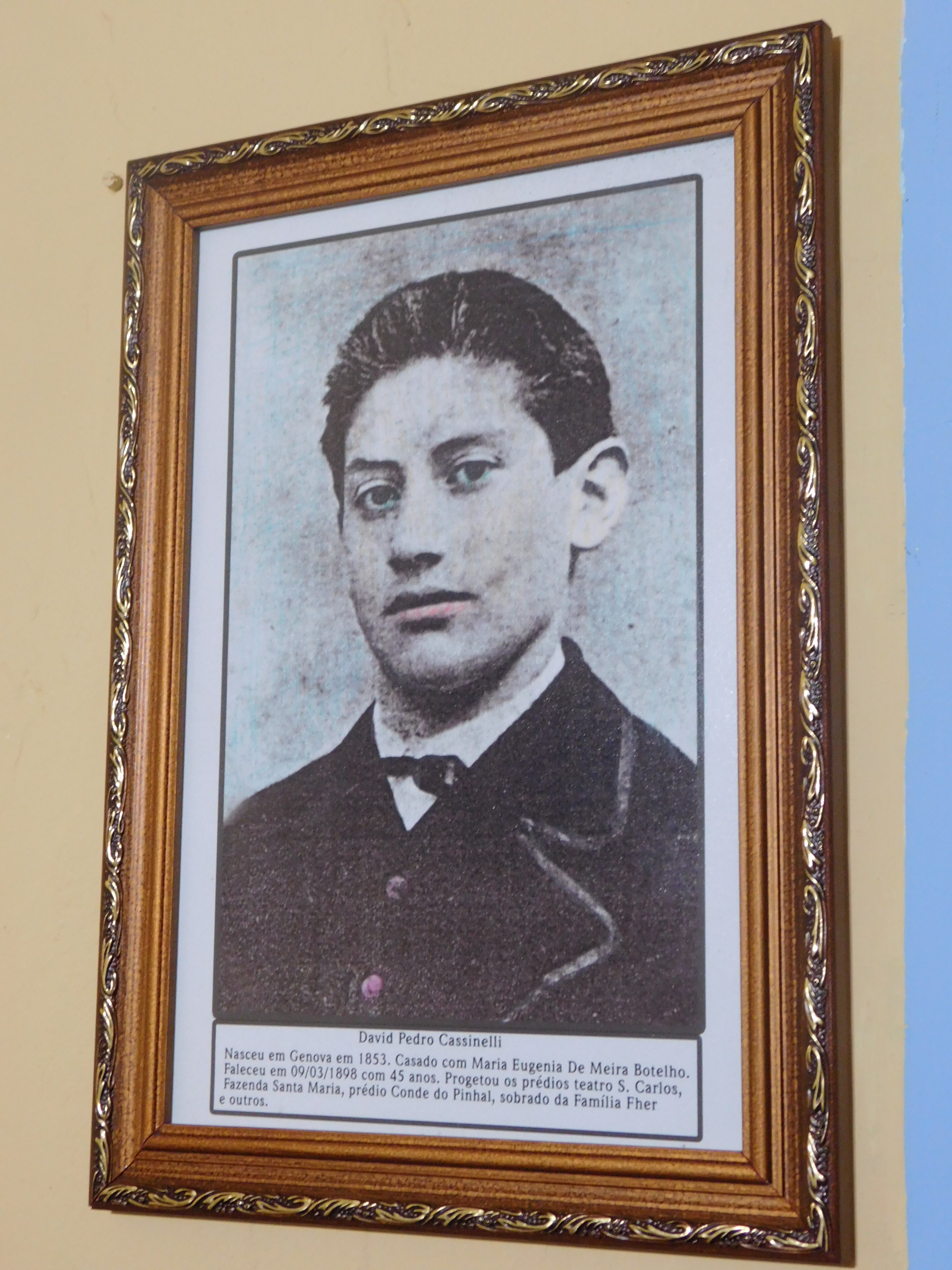
Pietro David Cassinelli (1853-1898).

Pietro David Cassinelli (Genoa, 1854 - São Carlos, 1898), noted for his involvement in the construction of the mansion, came to Brazil at the age of 28, arriving in São Carlos in 1882. He owned a furniture factory, and an ice factory and was one of the founders of the Societá Ginástica Educativa Cristóforo Colombo. He died of yellow fever at the age of 43. Cassinelli contributed to the construction of several notable buildings, including:

- Major house of the Santa Maria do Monjolinho Farm, owned by the Camargo Penteado family;
- Bento Carlos Mansion. 2056, Treze de Maio Street;
- Pillegi family residence. 1993 (former 185), Jesuíno de Arruda Street;
- Fehr family residence. 2137 (former 195/197), Jesuíno de Arruda Street (demolished);
- Ipiranga Theater. Major José Inácio Street (demolished).
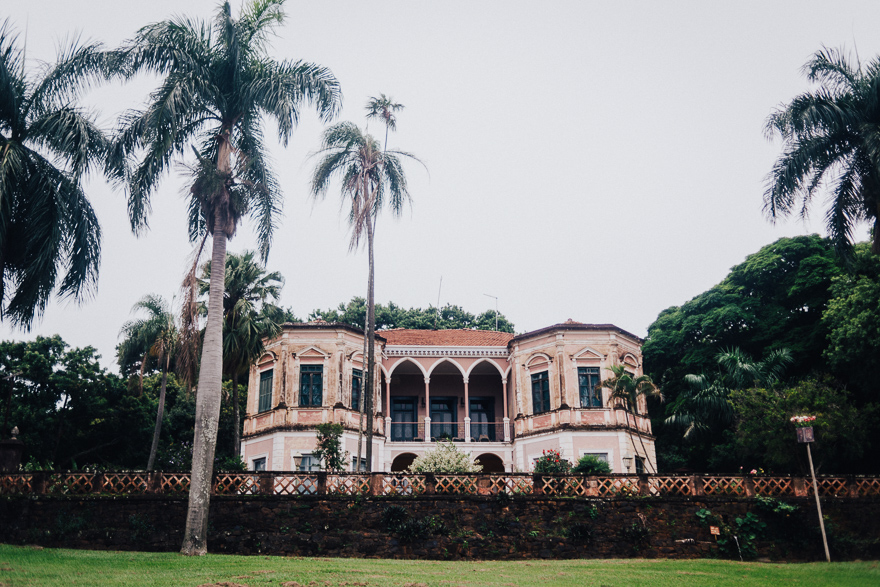
Santa Maria do Monjolinho Farm.

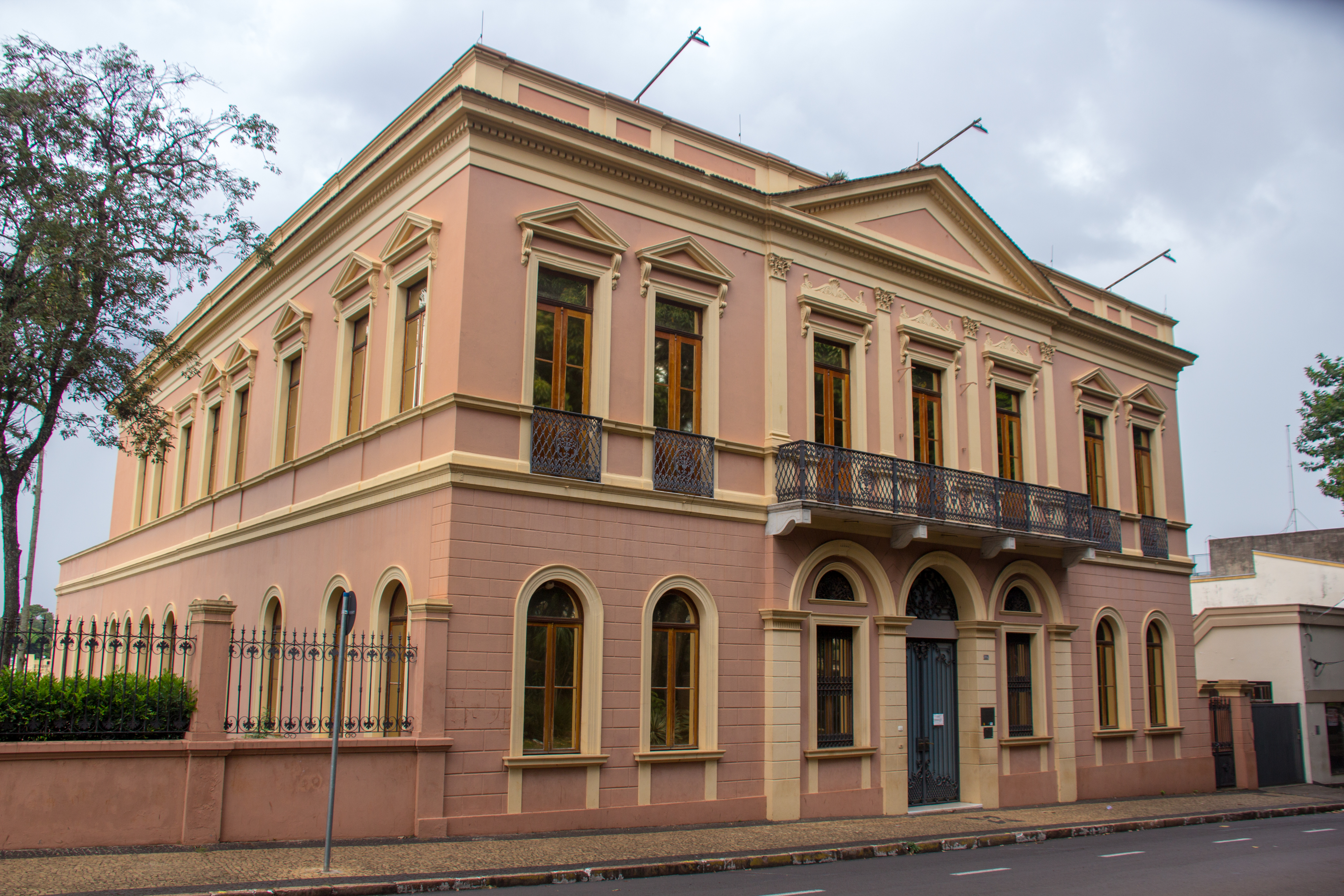
Bento Carlos Mansion

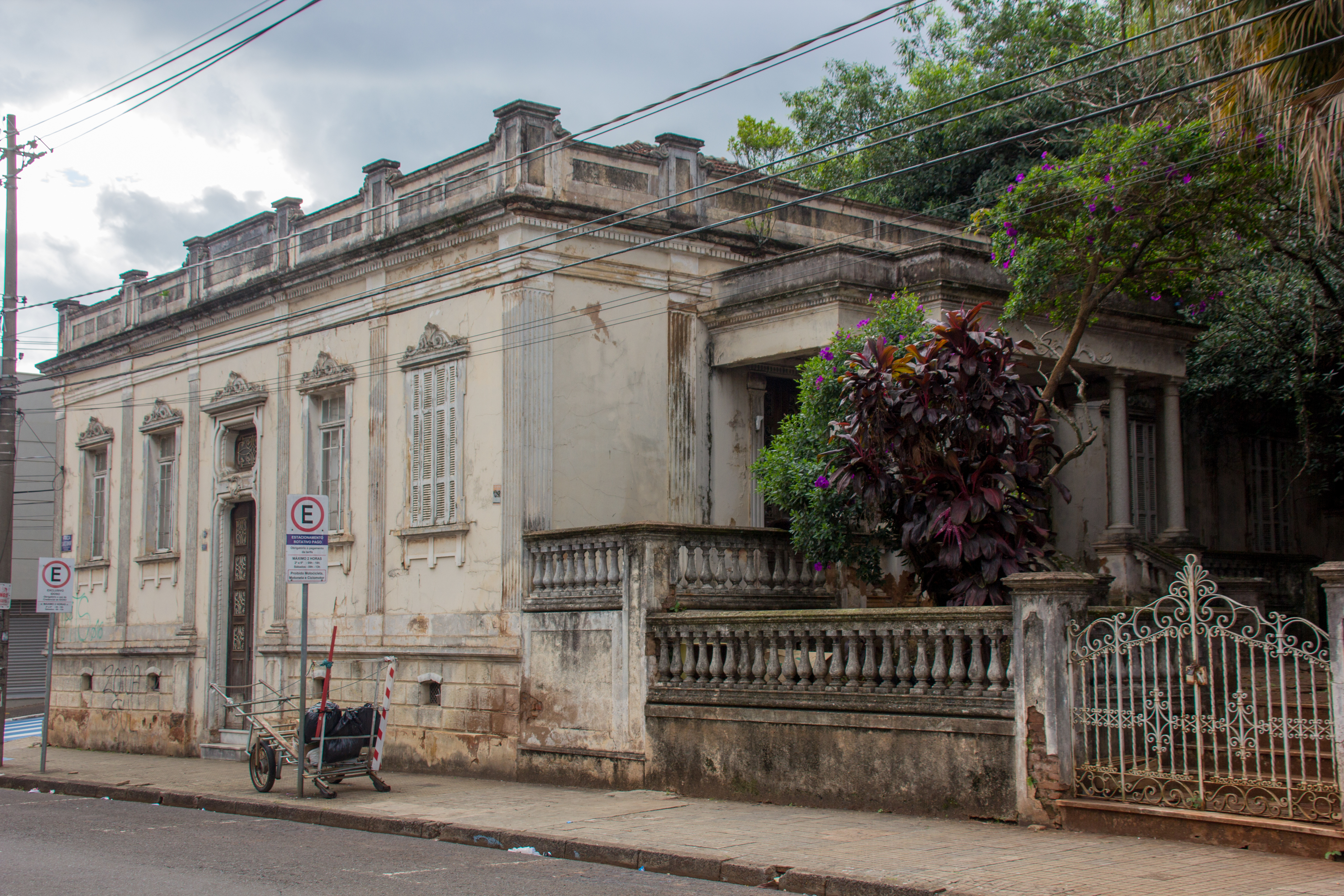
Pillegi family residence.

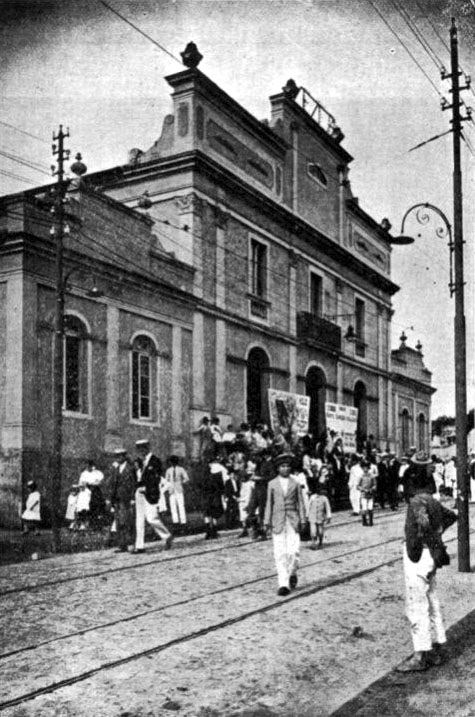
Ipiranga Theater.

== Historical heritage ==
Between 2002 and 2003, the São Carlos Pro-Memory Foundation (FPMSC), an agency of the city government, carried out an initial (unpublished) survey of the “properties of historical interest” (imóveis de interesse histórico - IDIH) in the city of São Carlos, covering around 160 blocks and analyzing more than 3,000 properties. Of these, 1,410 had original architecture from the late 19th century. Of these, 150 retained their original features, 479 had undergone significant alterations, and 817 were quite uncharacteristic. The names of the categories of buildings on the list have changed over the years.

The building covered by this entry is listed as a “Listed Building” (category 1 (Note: Category 1: these are buildings that have been listed at any level (municipal, state, or federal) and are included in the municipality's Inventory of Heritage Assets. Demolition is forbidden and renovations may or may not be permitted, provided that the specific guidelines of the listing process and the approval of the project by the City Hall, the municipal heritage protection body and council, and other competent federal, state, and/or municipal bodies are followed.)) in the inventory of heritage assets of the municipality of São Carlos, published in 2021 by the FPMSC, the municipal public body responsible for “preserving and disseminating the historical and cultural heritage of the Municipality of São Carlos". This heritage designation was published in the Official Gazette of the Municipality of São Carlos No. 1722, on March 9, 2021, on pages 10 and 11. It is included in the historical polygon delimited by the Foundation, which “comprises the urban fabric of São Carlos from the 1940s.” The polygon is shown on a map published on the Foundation's website, which indicates properties in the process of being listed or already listed by CONDEPHAAT (a state body), properties listed at a municipal level, and properties protected by the municipality (FPMSC).

=== Listed by ===
- CONDEPHAAT - Council for the Defense of Historical, Archaeological, Artistic and Tourist Heritage
  - Process number: 00466/74
  - Listing resolution: Resolução 23/10/1978
  - Diário Oficial da União publication: Executive, Section I, 10/25/1978, p. 54
  - Livro do Tombo Histórico: Inscription No. 116, p. 17, 06/26/1979
- FPMSC - São Carlos Pro-Memory Foundation / CONDEPHAASC - Historical Heritage, Artistic and Environmental Municipal Council of Defense of São Carlos
  - Process No.: 116/2010;
  - Municipal listing: Resolution No. 09, September 19, 2012;
  - Official Gazette publishing: September 21, 2012.

== See also ==
- São Bento Mansion
- Campos Eliseos Palace
