= São Carlos Clube =

- Full name: São Carlos Clube
- Nickname(s): Dória Sapequinha
- Founded: 1944
- Ground: Paulista; São Carlos, São Paulo State, Brazil
- Capacity: 2,000
- Chairman: Guilherme Dória
Home colours	Away colours	Third colours

São Carlos Clube, is a sports club from São Carlos in São Paulo state, Brazil.

O Clube (Portuguese for The Club) as it is known locally was founded on January 9, 1944. Their soccer team plays in blue and white uniforms.

== History ==
São Carlos Clube was born under adverse conditions in the 1940s—during the tense end of World War II, social clubs were prohibited from gathering members for either private or public celebrations. Cities were heavily monitored by government authorities, who prevented gatherings for security reasons.

Between 1938 and 1943, the São Carlos Tênis Clube (which, after merging with the Clube Comercial, would form the São Carlos Clube) did not register any social activities, resulting in a significant loss of members.

In 1943, a group of dissatisfied members of the Tênis Clube collectively decided to promote a merger with the Clube Comerciário de São Carlos. • January 9, 1944: The merger and approval of the new club’s bylaws took place, along with the election of the Advisory and Deliberative Councils and the Executive Board. The name São Carlos Clube was unanimously chosen. • January 23, 1944: The first directors’ meeting of São Carlos Clube was held. New membership fees were established, and new members joined, helping fund the construction of a new Social Headquarters on the land where the Avenida Headquarters now stands. • February 6, 1944: The new board and members strongly desired to develop a project for the Headquarters’ construction. On this day, the directors’ meeting officially marked the start of this dream, with the announcement of the purchase of the first construction materials for the project. • May 26, 1944: Presentation of the architectural project and the final blueprint for the Avenida Headquarters. • September 18, 1948: Inauguration of the Avenida Headquarters with a Gala Ball. That same year, the first Queen of São Carlos Clube was crowned. • March 21, 1951: Merger of São Carlos Clube with the Paulista Esporte Clube, enabling: • The start of the development of the Country Headquarters • The repositioning of the soccer field • The construction of both covered and uncovered bleachers (boosting local soccer) • The most significant project: the construction of the city’s first indoor sports arena, the João Marigo Sobrinho Gymnasium, inaugurated on November 4, 1952. In addition to major sports events, the gymnasium hosted citywide events and memorable shows.

Beyond the gymnasium, a series of construction projects over the years shaped the Country Headquarters into what it is today. The result of this collective effort elevated the São Carlos Clube to its current status: a respected institution with cutting-edge infrastructure, a model of conscious management, and historical-social relevance in the city.

Despite its 80 years of existence and established presence, the Club continues to draw inspiration from its history to grow and remain deeply connected to the history of São Carlos.

== Achievements ==
- Campeonato Paulista Série A3 (Third position and access for Second division): 1966

== Stadium ==
São Carlos Clube play their matches at Estádio Paulista located in downtown São Carlos, inaugurated in 1926. The stadium originally belonged to Paulista Esporte Clube, and was named after its owner. after Paulista merged with São carlos, São Carlos began to use the stadium. The stadium has a maximum capacity of 4,000 people.

== Trivia ==
- The club's mascot is an eagle.
