= São Carlos =

- Municipality
- Municipality of São Carlos
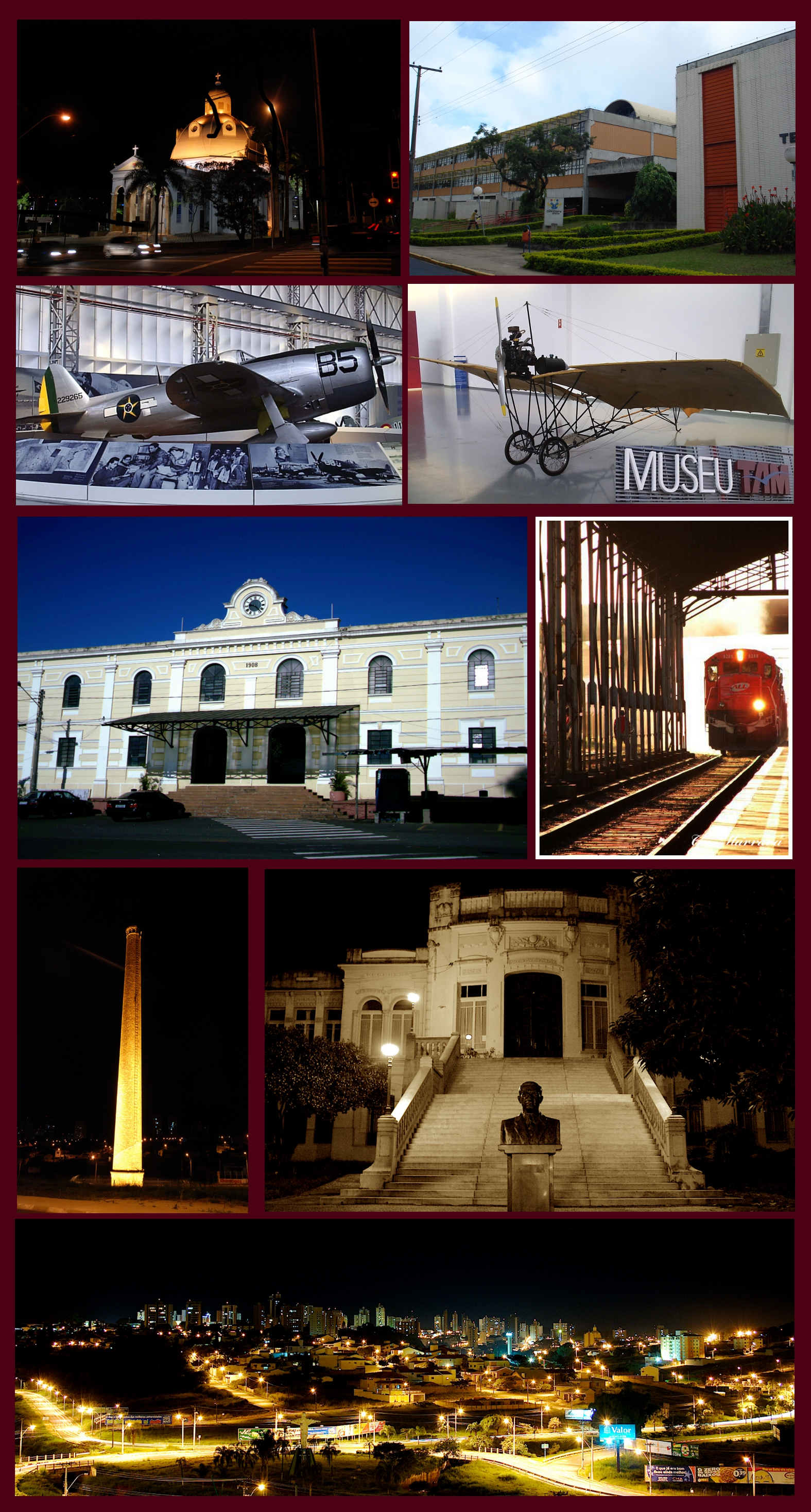
- Views of São Carlos, Top left:Night view of São Carlos Cathedral, Top right:Federal University of São Carlos, 2nd:Planes display in Wings of a Dream Museum, P-47D Thunderbolt(left), Santos Dumont Demoiselle(right), Middle:São Carlos railroad station, Entrance Building(left), track and platform(right), 4th left:Chamine Garden, 4th right:Alvaro Guiao School, Bottom:Night view of Downtown São Carlos from Iguatemi Shopping Mall

- Flag Coat of arms
- Nicknames: The Capital of Technology, Weather City and Sanca
- Motto: "A bandeirantibus venio" (Latin) "Proceed from bandeirantes"
- Location in São Paulo

- Location in Brazil
- Coordinates: 22°00′00″S 47°53′27″W
- Country: Brazil
- Region: Southeast
- State: São Paulo
- Founded: 4 November 1857
- Incorporated: 1880

Government
  - Mayor: Netto Donato (PP)

Area
  - Municipality: 1,136.907 km^{2} (438.962 sq mi)
  - Urban: 67.25 km^{2} (25.97 sq mi)
- Elevation: 856 m (2,808 ft)

Population (2022 Brazilian census)
  - Municipality: 254,857
  - Estimate (2025): 266,427
  - Density: 216.45/km^{2} (560.6/sq mi)
- Time zone: UTC-3 (UTC-3)
  - Summer (DST): UTC-2 (UTC-2)
- Postal code: 13570-000
- Area code: +55 16
- Website: saocarlos.sp.gov.br – São Carlos' Prefecture
- HDI (2000) 0.841 – high

São Carlos (Saint Charles, in English, Portuguese pronunciation: [sɐ̃w ˈkaʁlus]; named after Saint Charles Borromeo) is a Brazilian city and municipality in the interior of the state of São Paulo, 254 kilometers from the city of São Paulo. With a population of 266,427 inhabitants, it is the 13th largest city by population, and is almost in the center of the state of São Paulo. The municipality is formed by the headquarters and the districts of Água Vermelha, Bela Vista São-Carlense, Santa Eudóxia and Vila Nery.

The city is an important regional industrial center, with the economy based on industrial activities and farming, such as the production of sugar cane, oranges, milk, and chicken. Served by road and rail systems, São Carlos has a commercial unit of the Swiss multinational Leica Geosystems and production units of several multinational companies, including Volkswagen, Faber-Castell (the São Carlos subsidiary is the largest of the group in the world, producing 1.5 billion pencils per year), Electrolux, Tecumseh, Husqvarna, LATAM, Serasa Experian and Grupo Segurador BB-MAPFRE. Given local and, in some ways, regional needs, there is a network of commerce and services distributed in street stores, convenience stores and a mall of the Iguatemi network. In the field of research, besides the universities, two centers of technical development of Embrapa are present in the municipality. São Carlos is the first city in South America in numbers of doctors per inhabitant, according to a survey done since 2006 by UFSCar. In all, there are 1,700 PhDs, which represents one for every 135 inhabitants. In Brazil, the ratio is one PhD per 5423 inhabitants.

The city is home to several public higher education institutions, such as the Federal University of São Carlos (UFSCar), two campi of the University of São Paulo (USP), the Federal Institute of São Paulo (IFSP) and FATEC, as well as a private higher education institution. This makes intense the university activity in the city, which affects the population count. For this reason, São Carlos has a floating population of more than twenty-nine thousand graduates and graduate students, mostly from other cities and states.

The city has several streets and avenues that pay homage to historical figures and important names for the city and Brazil. Some of the main streets with significant names include Avenida Doutor Carlos Botelho – named after Carlos Botelho, an important Brazilian physician and politician who was a relevant figure in the development of the city, and Rua Conde do Pinhal – named after the Count of Pinhal, Antônio Carlos de Arruda Botelho, one of the largest coffee producers in the region and a central figure in the history of São Carlos.

== History ==
The region started to be settled in the end of the 18th century, with the opening of a road that led to the gold mines in Cuiabá and Goiás. Leaving from Piracicaba, passing through Rio Claro, the hills, fields and by typical vegetations of the Brazilian countryside, settlers established in the region. São Carlos' history started in 1831, when the "Pinhal" (Pines) allotment was demarcated.

On the city's foundation date, 4 November 1857, the population resided in some houses around the chapel and the inhabitants were mostly Arruda Botelho's family heirs, who were the first owners of the "Pinhal" allotments. Between 1831 and 1857 the pioneer coffee farms were formed, starting the first economic activity in the city. The coffee crops came to the "Pinhal" farm in 1840 and spread throughout the fertile lands around, becoming the main export item. The city foundation is credited to Antônio Carlos de Arruda Botelho, Count of Pinhal, an influent farmer and entrepreneur.

São Carlos was elevated to village in 1865, when a "Câmara", or ruling chamber, was created. In 1874, the village had 6,897 inhabitants, as a humble highlight of its fast growth and regional importance. It became a city in 1880 and in 1886, with a population of 16,104, its urban structure was settled.

The city arises on the coffee crops expansion context, which is relevant to the last two decades of the 19th century and to the first two of the 20th century. The arrival of the railway in 1884 provided an efficient system to transport the coffee production to the Santos harbor and boosted the economy of the region. The railway also contributed to the political and economic consolidation of the central area of the city.

When slavery ended, government created incentives to bring in immigrants. São Carlos had already received German nationals brought by the Count of Pinhal in 1876. Between 1880 and 1904, the city was one of the most important immigration centers in São Paulo state, the majority of them being Italians – specifically, Northern Italians. They worked in coffee plantations and in manufacturing factories, as well as trading activities.

In the beginning of the 20th century, countless cultural societies developed social activities aiming to promote literacy. Vittorio Emanuele Society in 1900 and Dante Alighieri in 1902 were but a few of them. The Italian presence was so significant that during the first half of the 20th century, the Italian government had a consulate branch in São Carlos.

With the Wall Street crash of 1929, coffee production went through a crisis, which made many immigrants leave rural areas for factories, wood artifact production, pottery, and construction.

Farmers had already applied the profits obtained with coffee in the constitution of several types of companies in São Carlos: banks, electricity, cable cars, telephones, water pumps, sewers, theaters, hospitals and schools. This established a foundation for industrialization in the city. With the arrival of immigrants from other urban centers from the 1930s – 1940s, their expertise was used to consolidate industrialization as the main economic activity in the city. Its peak years were the 1950s, when São Carlos became a manufacturing center, with relevant industrial expression in São Paulo state.

The industrial sector also developed through workshops that incorporated the coffee industry. The manufacture of processing machinery, shoes, fertilizers, hardware, furniture, pasta, cigars, as well as activities such as tailory, breweries, foundries, sawmills, weaving, pottery and pencil production expanded the economy of São Carlos in the 1930s. In the 1950s and 1960s, with the expansion of refrigeration, new factories of machinery and tractors arrived. Numerous small- and medium-sized companies which provided products and services were also established.

In the second half of the 20th century, the city received a boost of technological and higher educational development when in 1953 the Escola de Engenharia de São Carlos, or the Engineering School of the University of São Paulo, was created. In the 1970s, the Federal University of São Carlos was launched.

== Geography ==
São Carlos is located in the geographic center of the São Paulo state, approximately 231 km (144 mi) from the city of São Paulo. The city is the center of a microregion with 308,777 inhabitants.

The elevation is over 856 m. Most of the year the city is windy and sunny, with hot temperatures during all the year.

The city has a total area of 1.141 km^{2} (0.441 sq mi), which includes two districts to the north (Santa Eudóxia and Água Vermelha), one district to the west (Bela Vista São-carlense), and one district to the east (Vila Nery).

=== Geology ===
The municipality is included in the geomorphological province of the Basaltic and sandstone slopes, between the provinces of the Western Plateau (to the north) and the Paulista Periférica Depression (to the south). In São Carlos, included in the Paraná Basin, outcrops are found of the following geological formations: Bauru (Bauru Group), on the back of the slopes (Planalto de São Carlos), where the largest portion of the urban nucleus, further north; Serra Geral (São Bento Group), in the narrow region of slopes where relief occurs (slopes); Botucatu (São Bento Group), which contains the lower part of the slopes, further south, besides including the Guarani Aquifer. The soil of the municipality consists mainly of, in descending order: red-yellow latosol (LV); purple latosol (LR); deep quartz sand (AQ); dark red latosol (LE); structured purple earth (ET); only lithographic (Li); hydromorphic soil (Hi) and Podzolic soil (PV).

=== Vegetation ===
The original vegetation of the municipality, and the respective remnants, correspond respectively to: forest cerrado (cerradão, 16% and 2%); savanna (cerrado s.s., campo cerrado, campo campo) and campo (humid clean field); 27% and 2%); Atlantic Forest in the interior (semi-deciduous and riparian forests, 54% and 1%); Araucaria forest (semideciduous forest with araucaria, 1% and 0%) and capoeiras (degraded forests, 0% and 1%). Currently, much of the vegetation has been replaced by silvicultural plantations, Pastures and forestry. It should be remembered that, in the meantime, the proportions indicated above, partly obtained from interpretations of satellite images, have some uncertainty due to the difficulty of differentiating artificial grasses from natural clean fields. In a general view the savanna of Brazil.

In 2020 and 2021 the city was recognized in the international Urban Forest program "Tree Cities of the World" organized by the Food and Agriculture Organization of the United Nations (FAO/UN). According to the Ph.D. Urban Forester Daniel Caiche, this recognition promotes cities committed to planning and managing the Urban Forest.

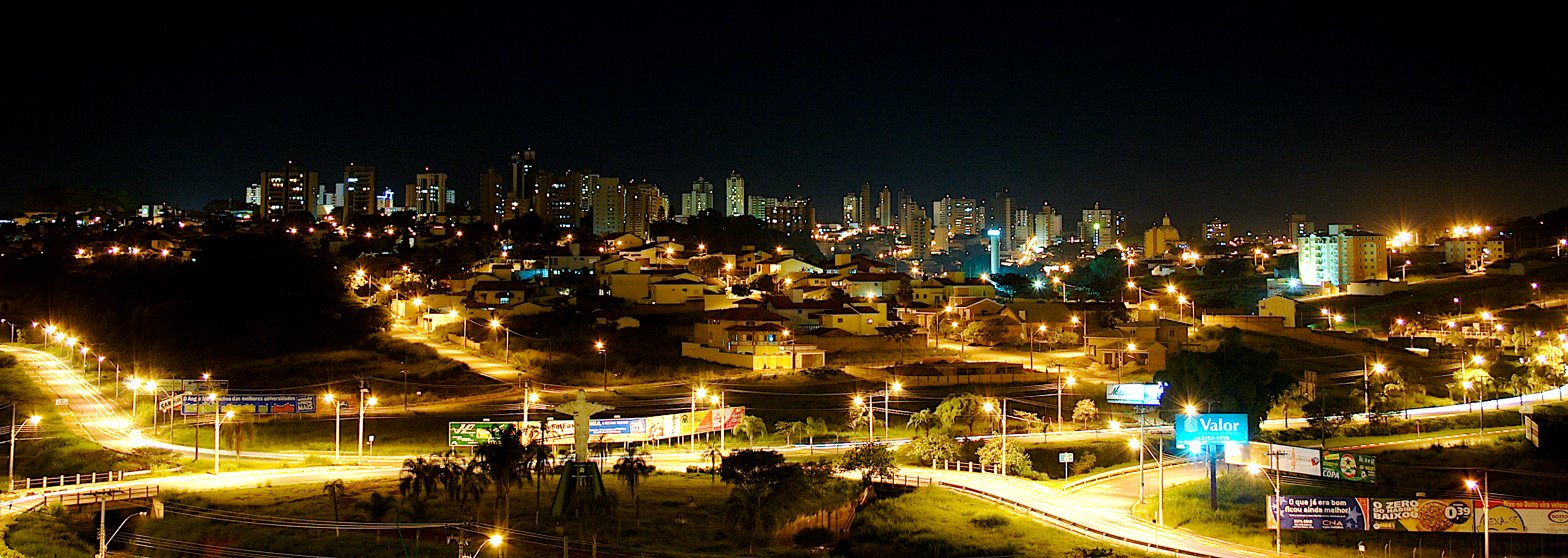
São Carlos Downtown seen from the Iguatemi Shopping Mall (2006 picture).

=== Hydrography ===
The municipality is inserted between two Hydrographic Units of Water Resources Management (UGRHI): No. 9, Mogi-Guaçu, and No. 13, Tietê-Jacaré. The urban area is mainly located in the catchment area of the Monjolinho river, included, serially, in the Jacaré-Guaçu, Tietê, Paraná and La Plata river basins. The urban area is cut by the rivers Monjolinho, Gregório and Santa Maria do Leme, and the streams Tijuco Preto, Simeão, Agua Quente and Água Fria, among others. The basin of the Mojiguaçu river, which has the Quilombo river, Araras stream, Cabaceiras stream, Guabirobas stream, Jararaca stream, Água Branca stream, Brejo Grande stream or Água Vermelha stream, Matinha stream, Negro stream, Pântano stream, stream Waterfall.

The basin of the Jacaré-Guaçu river, which has the Monjolinho river, Feijão stream, Cã Cã stream, and Sour Orange stream. The basin of the Monjolinho river, which counts with the stream Santa Maria Magdalena (or stream Santa Maria do Leme), stream of the Jockey Club, stream Espraiado, stream Federal, stream Belvedere, stream Bridge of Tábua, stream Alto Monjolinho, stream Mineirinho, creek Santa Fé, Paraíso stream, Tijuco Preto stream, Gregório stream, Botafogo stream, Medeiros stream, Água Quente stream and Água Fria stream.

The Gregório stream basin, which tarts in a rural area to the east of the city in approximately 900 meters of altitude (where the Monjolinho river and the Negro river are born, important water courses of this municipality). It has as tributaries by the right bank the First Water stream near SP-310 before the Gregorio stream crosses the highway, Sorregotti stream near Educativa; Lazarini stream near Major Manuel Antonio de Matos Street, Biquinha stream in Visconde de Inhaúma Street (and on the left bank the Simeão stream in the (canalized) market region, and runs westward for approximately 7 km, where it flows into the Monjolinho river, near the shopping center.

=== Environment ===
Part of São Carlos is included in the Corumbataí Environmental Protection Area (APA). Other conservation units are nearby: Itirapina Ecological Station (EE), EE Mata do Jacaré, and EE Jataí. In rural areas, there are also fragments of important native vegetation in some private legal reserves (LR), such as Fazenda Canchim, by Embrapa. The city presents a percentage of regularized properties for LRs, above the average calculated for the state.

As for the Permanent Preservation Areas (PPAs) of the rivers, many of those occurring in the urban area were irregularly occupied by marginal roads and buildings. However, little was done to compensate for the construction of these fringes, as well as to increase the minimum proportion of permeable area in adjacent plots. In addition, many rivers have been rectified or channeled, which are now considered inadequate. These factors, together, are determinant for the occurrence of floods in the city's lowlands.

The urban afforestation of the urban road network is diverse, but in quantitative terms, the number of trees is still very low, and many have conflicts with surrounding public facilities, such as aerial wiring and paving. As for pollution, the municipality has about two dozen areas contaminated, in particular, by waste from fuel stations, and dumps and landfills

=== Climate ===
According to the Köppen Climate Classification, the city has a humid subtropical climate (Cwa), with dry winter and hot months

According to data from the National Institute of Meteorology (INMET), since 1961 the lowest temperature recorded in São Carlos (conventional station of UFSCar) was 0,9 °C on 17 July 2000, and the highest reached 38.7 °C on 7 October 2020. The largest accumulated precipitation in 24 hours was 143.1 mm on 13 February 1980. The lowest relative air humidity index was 10%, recorded on 13 September 2010, 6 September 2011 and 16 September 2017 of that month.

Climate data for São Carlos, elevation 860 m (2,820 ft), (1991–2020 normals, extremes 1961–present)
Month	Jan	Feb	Mar	Apr	May	Jun	Jul	Aug	Sep	Oct	Nov	Dec	Year
Record high °C (°F)	36.3 (97.3)	36.6 (97.9)	36.0 (96.8)	35.0 (95.0)	32.0 (89.6)	30.0 (86.0)	31.0 (87.8)	35.0 (95.0)	38.0 (100.4)	38.7 (101.7)	36.9 (98.4)	36.0 (96.8)	38.7 (101.7)
Mean daily maximum °C (°F)	28.5 (83.3)	28.9 (84.0)	28.3 (82.9)	27.5 (81.5)	24.8 (76.6)	24.4 (75.9)	24.7 (76.5)	26.8 (80.2)	28.2 (82.8)	28.9 (84.0)	28.5 (83.3)	28.6 (83.5)	27.3 (81.1)
Daily mean °C (°F)	22.9 (73.2)	23.1 (73.6)	22.4 (72.3)	21.1 (70.0)	18.1 (64.6)	17.3 (63.1)	17.2 (63.0)	18.9 (66.0)	20.8 (69.4)	22.1 (71.8)	22.3 (72.1)	22.7 (72.9)	20.7 (69.3)
Mean daily minimum °C (°F)	19.0 (66.2)	19.0 (66.2)	18.4 (65.1)	16.6 (61.9)	13.6 (56.5)	12.6 (54.7)	12.3 (54.1)	13.5 (56.3)	15.4 (59.7)	17.2 (63.0)	17.6 (63.7)	18.5 (65.3)	16.1 (61.0)
Record low °C (°F)	9.0 (48.2)	9.0 (48.2)	7.0 (44.6)	6.9 (44.4)	4.5 (40.1)	2.2 (36.0)	0.9 (33.6)	3.2 (37.8)	4.8 (40.6)	6.2 (43.2)	7.0 (44.6)	9.0 (48.2)	0.9 (33.6)
Average precipitation mm (inches)	297.2 (11.70)	216.6 (8.53)	174.9 (6.89)	79.3 (3.12)	59.9 (2.36)	38.2 (1.50)	30.0 (1.18)	22.5 (0.89)	65.4 (2.57)	116.2 (4.57)	158.9 (6.26)	233.2 (9.18)	1,492.3 (58.75)
Average precipitation days (≥ 1.0 mm)	15	13	9	4	4	1	1	1	4	6	9	14	81
Average relative humidity (%)	80.2	78.5	78.0	75.9	76.9	73.7	68.6	62.3	64.9	68.3	71.8	78.2	73.1
Mean monthly sunshine hours	243.7	228.4	286.2	242.2	219.1	208.9	232.3	242.0	211.4	215.9	221.2	240.3	2,809
Source: Instituto Nacional de Meteorologia (precipitation days, humidity and sun 1981–2010)

== Demographics ==
Historical population (municipality)
Year	Population	%±
1920	54,225
1940	48,609	−10.4%
1950	47,731	−1.8%
1960	62,045	30.0%
1970	85,425	37.7%
1980	119,535	39.9%
1991	158,221	32.4%
2000	192,998	22.0%
2010	221,950	15.0%
2022	254,857	14.8%

== Economy ==
The city has an active industrial profile with important national and international industries and certain agricultural importance, backed by technologies developed by Embrapa, owner of two research complexes in the city. Due to its increasing number of high technology industries, the city has been proclaimed "The National Capital of Technology" by Brazilian President Dilma Rousseff in 2011.

The city hosts several locally-grown technology-based companies, such as Opto Eletrônicos, and factories of multinational corporations such as Faber Castell, Electrolux, Husqvarna, Tecumseh and the Brazilian plant of Volkswagen engines, and national corporations such as TAM MRO – Technology Center, Toalhas São Carlos, Tapetes São Carlos, Papel São Carlos, Prominas Brasil and Latina.

The economic basis of São Carlos is the tertiary sector. Commerce and services corresponds to 65.9% of the city's GDP. Industry is also relevant. With 32.3% of the economy, the secondary sector has a bigger participation than the state of São Paulo's average. The primary sector corresponds to 1.7% of the GDP.

== Culture ==
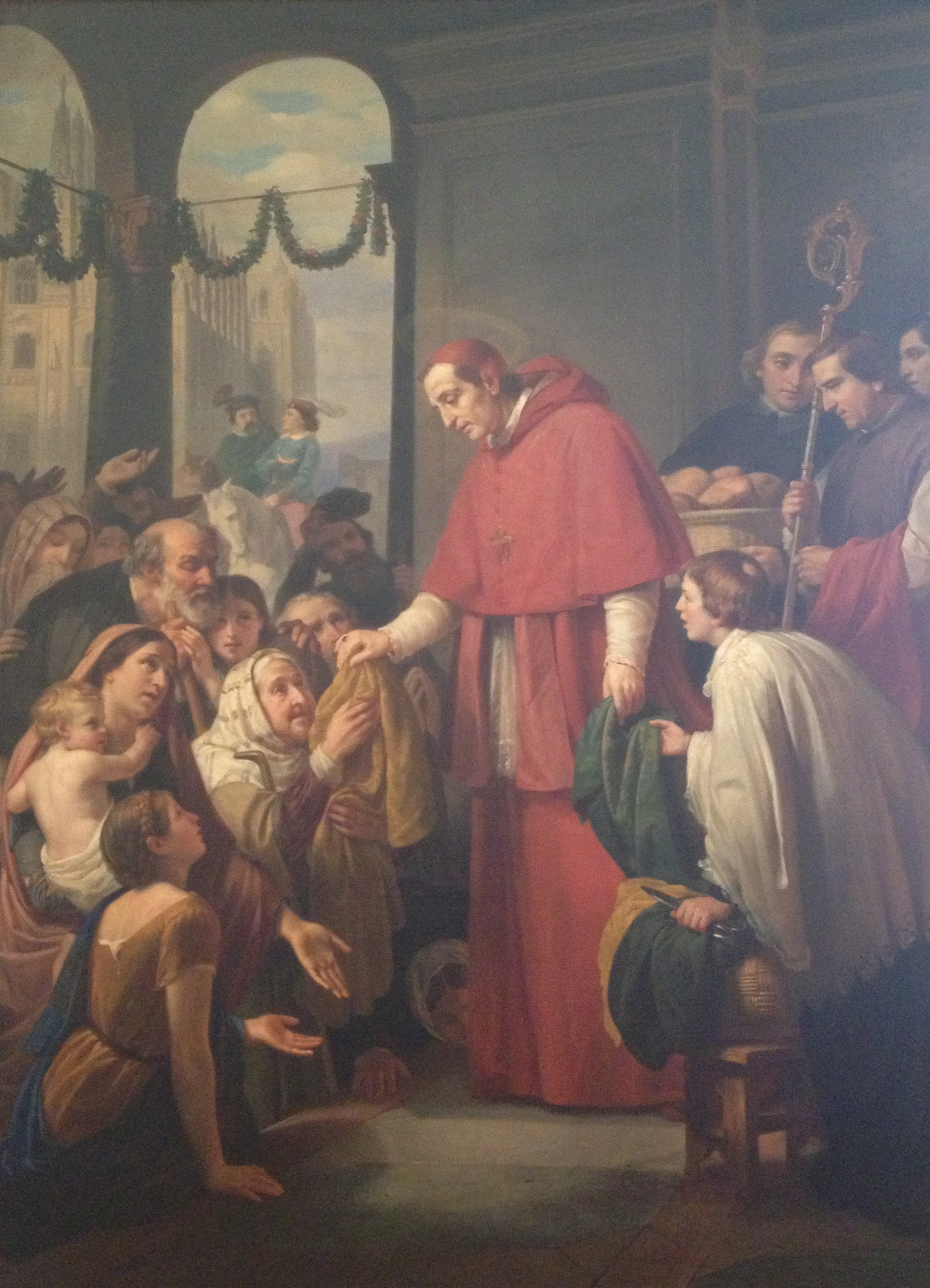
Saint Charles Borromeo Giving Alms to the Poor, an 1853 painting by José Salomé Pina – the town of São Carlos is named after the Catholic saint Carlos Borromeo, the cardinal archbishop of Milan from 1564 to 1584.

São Carlos is home to two Universidade de São Paulo campuses and the Universidade Federal de São Carlos (UFSCar), two of the most important higher learning centers in Brazil. Moreover, another minor and private university, Centro Universitário Central Paulista (UNICEP), is also based in São Carlos, and community colleges like SENAI, SESI, SESC, SENAC and the Escola Técnica Estadual Paulino Botelho. This has turned São Carlos into a university-oriented town, with an abundance of student-focused commercial establishments. It is also known for its student parties.

São Carlos' cultural life is marked by a young audience that enjoys musical concerts of Brazilian contemporary alternative artists that usually include the city in their tours. Also, São Carlos has 3 theaters and 7 commercial movie-theaters rooms.

There are two important events celebrated every year in the city, the Climate Party, which happens in April and has a traditional Orchid Exposition which features a craftwork fair and several food barracks. An Oktobertech fest is held yearly along with the São Carlos High Tech Fair (Fealtec).

The TAM Airlines Wings of a Dream Museum (Museu TAM) was in São Carlos, 15 kilometers (9.3 mi) from central São Carlos.

== Education ==
The Dr. Álvaro Guião State School was founded in 1911.

== Transportation ==
=== Roads ===
- SP-310 – Rodovia Washington Luís – 244 km to São Paulo
- SP-318 – Rodovia Eng. Thales de Lorena Peixoto Junior – 116 km to Ribeirão Preto
- SP-215 – Rodovia Luís Augusto de Oliveira and Rodovia Dr. Paulo Lauro e Dep. Vicente Botta

=== Air ===
The city is served by Mário Pereira Lopes International Airport, where one of the maintenance bases of TAM Airlines is located and well as the air and space TAM Museum, owned and maintained by the company. (Closest main airport that operates regular flights is RibeirÃo Preto Airport – about 90 km away.)

== Media ==
In telecommunications, the city was served by Telecomunicações de São Paulo. In July 1998, this company was acquired by Telefónica, which adopted the Vivo brand in 2012. The company is currently an operator of cell phones, fixed lines, internet (fiber optics/4G) and television (satellite and cable).

== Notable people ==
Born in São Carlos:

- Fábio Aurélio, Liverpool F.C. full-back
- Nenê, former NBA player
- Maurren Maggi, track and field athlete and 2008 Olympic gold medallist
- Gatti (Rafael Savério Gatti), former Brazilian football player
- Ronald Golias, actor and comedian
- Thiago Silva, UFC fighter
- Izabel Goulart, supermodel
- Felipe El Debs, Brazilian chess Grandmaster

== Twin towns – sister cities ==
- Coimbra, Portugal (since 1970)
- Tecumseh, Michigan, United States (since 1997)
- Santa Clara, Cuba (since 2005)
- Santa Cruz, Rio Grande do Norte, Brazil

== See also ==
- University of São Paulo – USP
- Federal University of São Carlos – UFSCar
- Rodovia Washington Luís
- São Carlos Airport
- GE Sãocarlense
- São Carlos FC
- Estádio Luís Augusto de Oliveira
- São Carlos Clube
- Estádio Paulista
- Count of Pinhal Mansion
