= Rodovia José Magalhães Teixeira =

High-speed ring road of Campinas, Brazil

SP-083
- Rodovia José Magalhães Teixeira: Anel Viário de Campinas; Rodovia do Contorno
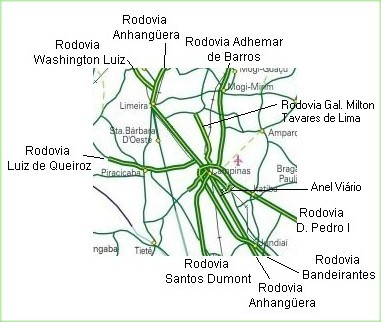
- Map of the Highway Ring of Campinas

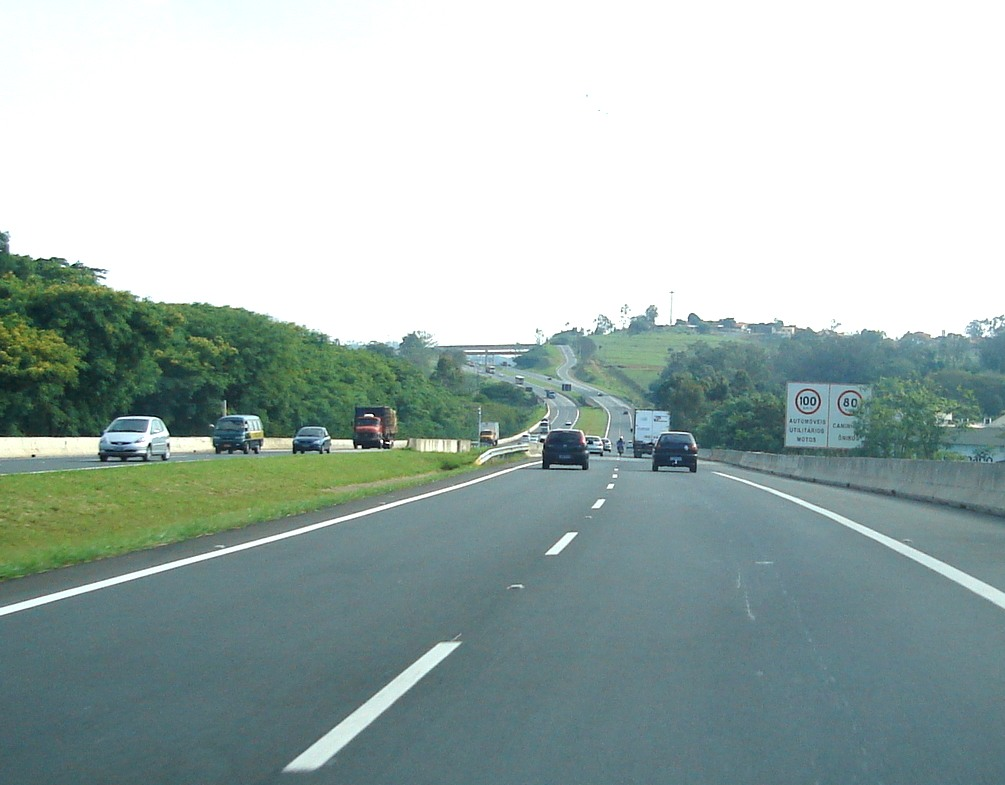
- View of the first kilometer of Rodovia José Magalhães Teixeira.

Route information
- Maintained by Rota das Bandeiras
- Length: 12 km (7.5 mi) 18 km (11 mi) total (6 km extension) as of 2015.
- Existed: 2001 (North, East and West Segments); 2015 (South Segment)–present
- Restrictions: Some sections of the South Segment are still in construction (they will be completed in 2017).

Major junctions
- Beltway around Campinas, Brazil
- North end: Rodovia Dom Pedro I Complexo Viário Abram Steinberg in Campinas, SP
- SP-91
- South end: Rodovia Anhanguera in Valinhos, SP Rodovia dos Bandeirantes in Campinas, SP (2015); Rodovia Miguel Melhado Campos in Campinas, SP (2016) Rodovia Santos Dumont in Indaiatuba, SP (2017)

Location
- Country: Brazil
- State: São Paulo

Highway system
- Highways in Brazil; Federal; São Paulo State Highways

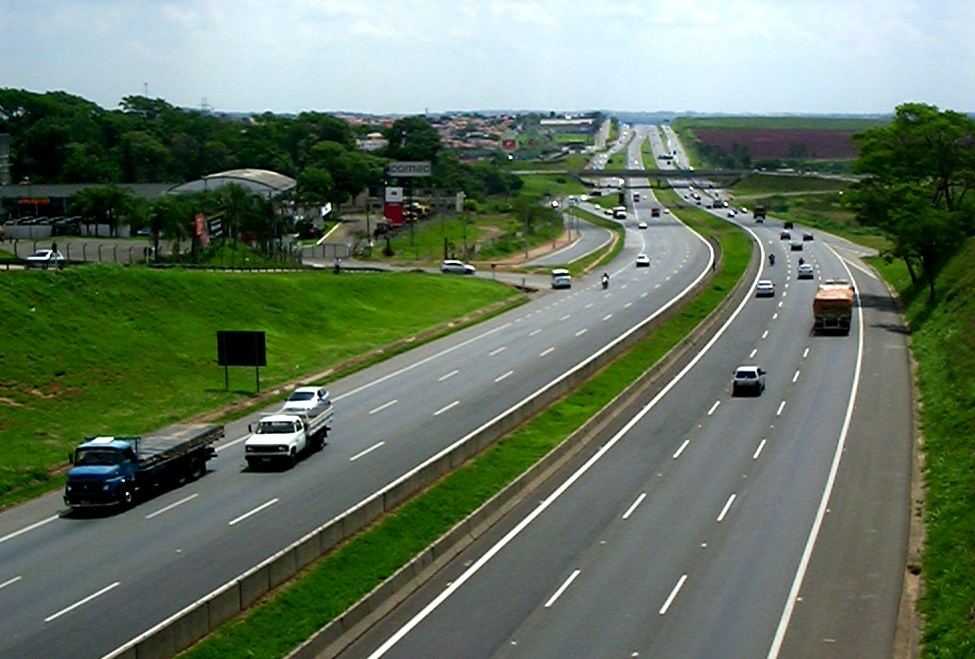
Rodovia Dom Pedro I, km 145, a section which is a part of the Campinas Beltway.

The Rodovia José Magalhães Teixeira (official designation SP-083) is the Campinas Beltway (in Portuguese: Anel Viário de Campinas), a ring of high-speed highways surrounding the city of Campinas, in the state of São Paulo, Brazil. The Campinas Beltway is the Northern vertex of the Macrometropolitan Highway System of Greater São Paulo and one of the few complete metropolitan beltways in the country. It is an extensive structure, which directly interconnects 6 large double-lane highways to all quadrants of the state. Furthermore, it is superdimensioned, i.e., it has enough capacity to accommodate huge traffic loads without getting congested, even in peak hours.

It is also known as Rodovia do Contorno and it is maintained by Rota das Bandeiras.

The beltway itself is formed by a short (12 km) connection between the highways Rodovia Anhanguera and Rodovia Dom Pedro I (East Segment), and those highways (West and North Segments, respectively). They encircle the urban core of Campinas, with a total length of 42 km.

As of 2015, it is anticipated there will be an expansion of the beltway, thus forming the South Segment. It has 6 km of extension and will connect directly with Rodovia dos Bandeirantes, Rodovia Santos Dumont, Rodovia Miguel Melhado Campos and also with the Viracopos International Airport. This expansion will be completed in 2017, but the first section (between Rodovia Anhanguera and Rodovia dos Bandeirantes) was inaugurated in 2015. The West Segment will be formed by Rodovia dos Bandeirantes and Rodovia Adalberto Panzan. This way, the beltway will have 18 km of length.

The highways directly connected to the Campinas hub are:

- SP-340: Rodovia Adhemar de Barros to Mogi Guaçu, Moji-Mirim, Aguaí, Casa Branca and Mococa.
- SP-330: Rodovia Anhanguera, from São Paulo City, Jundiaí, Louveira, Vinhedo and Valinhos to Sumaré, Americana, Limeira, Araras, Leme, Pirassununga, Porto Ferreira, Cravinhos, Ribeirão Preto, Orlândia, São Joaquim da Barra and Ituverava.
- SP-348: Rodovia dos Bandeirantes, from São Paulo City to Campinas and there to Hortolândia, Santa Bárbara d'Oeste and Cordeirópolis, connecting to Rodovia Washington Luís.
- SP-065: Rodovia Dom Pedro I to Valinhos, Itatiba, Atibaia, Nazaré Paulista and Jacareí, connecting to Rodovia Presidente Dutra.
- SP-075: Rodovia Santos Dumont to Indaiatuba, Salto, Itu and Sorocaba, connecting to Rodovia Castelo Branco and Rodovia Raposo Tavares.
- SP-332: Rodovia General Milton Tavares de Souza to Paulínia.
- SP-101: Rodovia Francisco Aguirre Proença to Hortolândia and Monte Mor and thence to Capivari and Rafard

Less than 60 km from the hub, other important highways can be reached via high speed double-lane accesses from Campinas:

- SP-306: Rodovia Luiz de Queiroz, to Piracicaba.
- SP-310: Rodovia Washington Luís, to Rio Claro, São Carlos, Araraquara, Catanduva, São José do Rio Preto and Mirassol, connecting to the Rodovia Transbrasiliana.
- BR-381: Rodovia Fernão Dias, to the state of Minas Gerais and Belo Horizonte.

Through São Paulo City, the Campinas Beltway connects to the Southern vertex of the Macrometropolitan Ring of Sâo Paulo, to highways Rodovia dos Imigrantes, Rodovia Anchieta and Rodovia Régis Bittencourt.

The greatest part of the Campinas Beltway runs inside the urban zone (i.e., there are several highly populated sections of the cities of Campinas and Valinhos on the outside of the ring), thus its traffic is quite high. The highways which are part of it are now for all practical purposes used like urban avenues, with dozens of points of entrance, bridgeworks, viaducts, vicinal roads and streets, etc. The segments which comprise the ring are not tolled, due to a prohibition by the municipality of Campinas.

The region surrounding the beltway has one of the highest rates of urban growth and development in the city. Many high-technology companies have established their factories and offices alongside the Ring's highways, such as Lucent and Samsung. The majority of the city's shopping malls are also located along the Ring, such as the Dom Pedro, Campinas Outlet, Galleria and Iguatemi malls. In addition, the Ring's Northern and Eastern sections have witnessed a large and fast growth of luxury horizontal condominia, such as Alphaville and Gramado.

The structure is so named in honour of deceased, twice mayor of Campinas, Dr. José Roberto Magalhães Teixeira.

== See also ==
- Highway system of São Paulo
- Highways serving Campinas (In Portuguese)

22°54′19.67″S 47°00′32.42″W
