= SP-83 (São Paulo highway) =

State highway in São Paulo, Brazil

SP-083

Route information
- Length: 21.800 km (13.546 mi)

Location
- Country: Brazil
- State: São Paulo

Highway system
- Highways in Brazil; Federal; São Paulo State Highways

The SP-83 is a highway in the southeastern part of the state of São Paulo in Brazil. The highway is known as the Rodovia Anel Viário José Roberto Magalhães Teixeira in its entire length.

The highway connects with highways named the Rodovia Anhangüera, D. Pedro I and Bandeirantes (SP-348) in Campinas. The highway is 12 km in length and will extend to Rodovias Anhangüera (km 86) and D. Pedro I (km 128).

As of 2015, there is anticipated an expansion of the highway, which will connect directly with Rodovia Santos Dumont, Rodovia Miguel Melhado Campos and also with the Viracopos International Airport. This section has 6 km of extension and will be completed in 2017; this way the highway will have 18 km of length.
