= Copa Energil C =

2007 Copa Energil C
Tournament details
- Country: Brazil
- Dates: 4 Aug – 2 Dec
- Teams: 8

Final positions
- Champions: Independente (Limeira)
- Runners-up: Flamengo (Guarulhos)

Tournament statistics
- Top goal scorer(s): Edson Souza (Portuguesa Santista); Paulinho (Inter de Limeira); 6 goals each

The Copa Energil C was a football competition organized by the Federação Paulista de Futebol (FPF) created for clubs that failed to qualify for the 2007 Copa FPF edition. The competition did not serve as a qualifier for any national championship, with only a prize of R$30,000 for the champions and R$10,000 for the runner-up.

== Participants ==
Participation was open to all clubs not classified for the FPF Cup, however only 8 clubs were interested in the dispute:

| Club | City | Criteria |
|---|---|---|
| Comercial | Ribeirão Preto | 13º place in 2007 Série A2 |
| Taquaritinga | Taquaritinga | 14º place in 2007 Série A2 |
| Inter de Limeira | Limeira | 15º place in 2007 Série A2 |
| Portuguesa Santista | Santos | 16º place in 2007 Série A2 |
| Flamengo | Guarulhos | 11º place in 2007 Série A3 |
| Independente | Limeira | 13º place in 2007 Série A3 |
| SEV | Hortolândia | 14º place in 2007 Série A3 |
| Francana | Franca | 15º place in 2007 Série A3 |

== Format ==
The championship was disputed in a double round-robin system, with the four best placed team advancing to the semifinals (1°×4°, 2°×3°) and the two winners advancing to the finals.

=== First stage ===
| Pos | Team | Pld | W | D | L | GF | GA | GD | Pts | Qualification or relegation |
|---|---|---|---|---|---|---|---|---|---|---|
| 1 | Portuguesa Santista | 14 | 9 | 3 | 2 | 26 | 11 | +15 | 30 | Advanced to Semifinals |
| 2 | Independente | 14 | 7 | 3 | 4 | 20 | 16 | +4 | 24 | Advanced to Semifinals |
| 3 | SEV | 14 | 6 | 6 | 2 | 15 | 7 | +8 | 24 | Advanced to Semifinals |
| 4 | Flamengo | 14 | 5 | 6 | 3 | 15 | 13 | +2 | 21 | Advanced to Semifinals |
| 5 | Inter de Limeira | 14 | 6 | 2 | 6 | 17 | 18 | −1 | 20 | |
| 6 | Francana | 14 | 4 | 4 | 6 | 8 | 12 | −4 | 16 | |
| 7 | Comercial | 14 | 3 | 1 | 10 | 8 | 22 | −14 | 4 (Note: Comercial and Taquaritinga lost 6 points due for fielding an ineligible player) | |
| 8 | Taquaritinga | 14 | 1 | 5 | 8 | 13 | 23 | −10 | 2 | |

Updated to match(es) played on September 28, 2022. Source: RSSSF.com, Futebol Nacional
Rules for classification: 1) points; 2) wins; 3) goal difference; 4) head-to-head points.

=== Knockout stage ===
Semifinals
1 | Portuguesa Santista | 1 | 1 | 2
4 | Flamengo | 2 | 1 | 3
2 | Independente | 1 | 1 | 1
3 | SEV | 1 | 1 | 1

Finals
Flamengo | 0 | 1 | 1
Independente | 3 | 1 | 4

1. Independente has advanced due to the best campaign
