= SP101 =

SP101 or SP-101 may refer to:

- SP-101 (Brazil), a State highway in Brazil
- Ruger SP101, a series of double-action revolvers
- USS Panama (SP-101), an armed motorboat that served in the United States Navy as a patrol vessel from 1917 to 1920
