= Montemor =

Montemor may refer to the following places in Portugal:

- Montemor-o-Novo, a municipality in the district of Évora
- Montemor-o-Velho, a municipality in the district of Coimbra

== See also ==
- Monte Mor, municipality in the state of São Paulo, Brazil
