= Lucas Mufalo =

Brazilian footballer

Personal information
- Full name: Lucas Vinícius Mufalo Silva
- Date of birth: 9 January 1998 (age 28)
- Place of birth: Campinas, Brazil
- Height: 1.86 m (6 ft 1 in)
- Position: Centre-back

Team information
- Current team: Capital-DF

Youth career
- 2013–2014: SEV Hortolândia
- 2015–2018: Bragantino

Senior career*
Years	Team	Apps	(Gls)
2018	XV de Piracicaba	0	(0)
2019	Grêmio Osasco	6	(0)
2019	→ Caldense (loan)	4	(0)
2020–2022	Caldense	39	(1)
2022–2023	Fafe	17	(1)
2023	Ponte Preta	0	(0)
2024	Pouso Alegre	4	(0)
2024	São Caetano	0	(0)
2025	Sertãozinho	10	(0)
2025	Mamoré	5	(0)
2025	União São João	0	(0)
2026	São José-SP	1	(0)
2026–	Capital-DF	0	(0)
- * Club domestic league appearances and goals as of 20:03, 27 November 2025 (UTC)

Lucas Vinícius Mufalo Silva (born 9 January 1998) is a Brazilian footballer who plays as a centre-back for Capital-DF.

== Career ==
Born in Campinas, São Paulo, Mufalo played for SEV Hortolândia and Bragantino as a youth. In June 2018, he signed for XV de Piracicaba to play in the year's Copa Paulista.

After beginning the 2019 season at Grêmio Osasco, Mufalo subsequently moved to Caldense (initially on loan and later in a permanent deal), where he became a regular starter before suffering a knee injury in November 2020. He spent more than a year sidelined before returning in January 2022, and renewed his contract with the club in April.

On 19 August 2022, Mufalo moved abroad for the first time in his career, agreeing to a contract with Portuguese Liga 3 side AD Fafe. He left the club the following June, and joined Ponte Preta shortly after, but only played for an under-23 side in the Copa Paulista.

On 11 December 2023, Mufalo was announced at Pouso Alegre for the upcoming season. He later moved to São Caetano, but had his contract rescinded in September due to indiscipline problems.

Mufalo agreed to a deal with Sertãozinho in December 2024, and won the 2025 Campeonato Paulista Série A3 before moving to Mamoré in June of that year. He then played for União São João before being announced at São José-SP on 26 November.

== Career statistics ==
As of 22 April 2026

Club	Season	League			State League		Cup		Continental		Other		Total	
Club	Season	Division	Apps	Goals	Apps	Goals	Apps	Goals	Apps	Goals	Apps	Goals	Apps	Goals
XV de Piracicaba	2018	Paulista A2	—		—		—		—		15 (Note: Appearance(s) in Copa Paulista)	3	15	3
Grêmio Osasco	2019	Paulista A3	—		6	0	—		—		4	1	10	1
Caldense	2019	Série D	4	0	—		—		—		—		4	0
Caldense	2020	Série D	9	0	13	0	—		—		—		22	0
Caldense	2021	Série D	0	0	0	0	—		—		—		0	0
Caldense	2022	Série D	12	1	5	0	—		—		—		17	1
Caldense	Subtotal		25	1	18	0	—		—		—		43	1
Fafe	2022–23	Liga 3	17	1	—		—		—		—		17	1
Ponte Preta	2023	Série B	—		—		—		—		6	0	6	0
Pouso Alegre	2024	Série D	—		4	0	—		—		—		4	0
São Caetano	2024	Paulista A3	—		—		—		—		4	1	4	1
Sertãozinho	2025	Paulista A3	—		10	0	—		—		—		10	0
Mamoré	2025	Mineiro Módulo II	—		5	0	—		—		—		5	0
União São João	2025	Paulista A3	—		—		—		—		4	0	4	0
São José-SP	2026	Paulista A2	—		1	0	—		—		—		1	0
Capital-DF	2026	Série D	0	0	—		—		—		—		0	0
Career total			42	2	44	0	0	0	0	0	33	5	119	7

== Honours ==
Sertãozinho

- Campeonato Paulista Série A3: 2025
