= Elector =

Elector may refer to:

- Prince-elector or elector, a member of the electoral college of the Holy Roman Empire, having the function of electing the Holy Roman Emperors
- Elector, a member of an electoral college
  - Confederate elector, a member of the Electoral College (Confederate States), which elected the President Jefferson Davis, and Vice President Alexander H. Stephens
  - U.S. presidential and vice presidential elector, a member of the Electoral College (United States), which formally chooses the president and vice president of the United States
- Elector, a science fiction novella by Charles Stross, incorporated into Accelerando (novel)

== See also ==
- Electoral college (disambiguation)
- Electorate (disambiguation)
