= José Roberto Magalhães Teixeira =

Brazilian politician

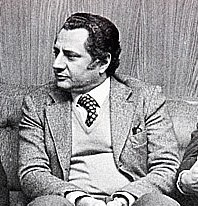
José Roberto Magalhães Teixeira in 1979

José Roberto Magalhães Teixeira was a Brazilian politician, twice mayor of the municipality of Campinas, in the state of São Paulo.

Born in Andradas, state of Minas Gerais, on 18 June 1937, he moved to Campinas in 1957, in order to study dentistry at the Pontifical Catholic University. He became widely known by his nickname, "Grama", because he had formerly lived in the city of São Sebastião da Grama.

Simultaneously with his work as a dentist, Grama began his political career as candidate to councilman in 1968, running under the Movimento Democrático Brasileiro (MDB) opposition party. He was not elected, but he persisted and in 1976 he was elected a vice-mayor of Campinas. In 1982 he was elected mayor with 44,65% of valid votes. In 1988, he was considered the best mayor of Brazil by a poll carried out by the prestigious newspaper Folha de S.Paulo. Among his many endeavours, he was the first mayor to institute in Brazil a Guaranteed Minimum Income Grant program, in order to reduce social inequalities. In the same year, Grama helped to found the PSDB (Partido da Social Democracia Brasileira).

After finishing his mandate as mayor, Dr. Magalhães Teixeira ran for a federal representative of the state of São Paulo in 1990 and was elected with the largest ballot of the history of Campinas, with 136.522 votes. His mandate was marked by his active participation in the process which culminated in the impeachment of President Fernando Collor de Mello in 1992. In the same year, Magalhães Teixeira was elected again for mayor of Campinas, with a vote of 224.365 votes. In 1994, he was nominated as coordinator in São Paulo of the campaign which elected President Fernando Henrique Cardoso.

Affected by a hepatic cancer, he was unable to finish his second mandate, deceasing on February 29, 1996. He was homaged by a massive popular manifestation in his interment.

A cultural center in Campinas, an industrial technical school (SESI) in Taboão da Serra, and the Campinas Beltway (Anel Viário) are named after him.
