= Electorate =

Electorate may refer to:

- The people who are eligible to vote in an election, especially their number e.g. the term size of (the) electorate
- The dominion of a prince-elector in the Holy Roman Empire until 1806
- An electoral district or constituency, the geographic area of a particular election

== See also ==
- Elector (disambiguation)
