= Hortolândia =

- Municipality

- Flag Coat of arms

- Location in São Paulo state

- Location in Brazil
- Coordinates: 22°51′30″S 47°13′12″W
- Country: Brazil
- Region: Southeast Brazil
- State: São Paulo
- Metropolitan Region: Campinas
- Established: May 19, 1991

Government
  - Mayor: José Nazareno Zezé Gomes (Liberal Party)

Area
  - Municipality: 62.42 km^{2} (24.10 sq mi)
  - Urban: 24.5341 km^{2} (9.4727 sq mi)
  - Rural: 37.7 km^{2} (14.6 sq mi)
- Elevation: 587 m (1,926 ft)

Population (2022 Brazilian census)
  - Municipality: 236,641
  - Estimate (2025): 248,842
  - Density: 3,791/km^{2} (9,819/sq mi)
- Time zone: UTC-3 (BRT)
  - Summer (DST): UTC-2 (BRST)
- Website: www.hortolandia.sp.gov.br

Hortolândia is a Brazilian municipality in the interior of the state of São Paulo. It is part of the Metropolitan Region of Campinas and the Mesoregion and Microregion of Campinas. It is located northwest of the state capital, about 110 km away. It is part of the São Paulo macrometropolis, which exceeds 29 million inhabitants and makes up approximately 75 percent of the state's population. The metropolitan regions of Campinas and São Paulo form the first megalopolis in the southern hemisphere. It is bordered by Sumaré, to the north; Monte Mor, to the south and west; and Campinas, to the east.

Hortolândia was founded in 1991, splitting from Sumaré, and the privileged location and proximity to major industrial centers in the country caused the municipality to undergo a rapid demographic and industrial development. Hortolândia is considered a technopole and has several high tech companies, including IBM. These activities make the city have the 76th largest nominal municipal GDP in Brazil, with BR$12.9 billion in 2017. Hortolândia has several campuses of renowned universities, such as the Federal Institute of São Paulo and the Adventist University Center of São Paulo.

Some of the city's main attractions are important green areas that provide space for sports and resting. There are also the cultural projects and events held by the Municipal Secretariat of Culture, the body responsible for projecting the cultural life of Hortolândia.

== History ==
=== Origins ===
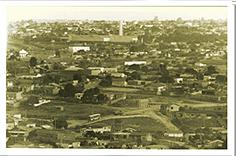
Jacuba in the 19th century

In 1798, lands were donated by the Portuguese Crown to José Teixeira Nogueira, an important mill owner in the region. He brought coffee for the first time to where the city of Hortolândia is today, whose work on the farms was based on slavery. After the slaves were freed, lands were donated to them, but stolen by an American doctor. Some areas were even renegotiated, but those that were made available did not favor coffee, so cotton, sugarcane and cattle breeding began to be grown. The place, which served as a stopping point for tropeiro, settlers and slaves, came to be called Jacuba (a Tupi-Guarani word meaning "hot water"), or the Sítio de Jacuba, since these travelers took advantage of the waters of the streams and the shade of the trees to rest and feed themselves.

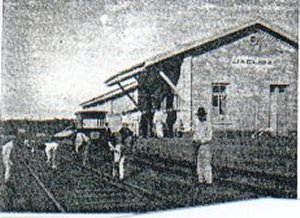
Jacuba in 1918

The settlement began to take utterance when the telegraph office was inaugurated in 1896. Later, in 1917, the Jacuba telegraph post became a railroad station. Only in 1947 did its growth begin, with the approval of the Ortolândia Park subdivision, owned by João Ortolan. In December 1953, the District of Santa Cruz, which Jacuba was part of, was split from Campinas to become the municipality of Sumaré; as such, Jacuba went from a village to a district.

On April 17, 1958, Jacuba became known as Hortolândia, on the occasion of a legislative proposal by state deputy Leôncio Ferraz Júnior. The proposal to change the name came about because a district with the name "Jacuba" already existed in the state of São Paulo in the town of Iacanga (which later became part of the town of Arealva).

In the mid-1970s, an industrialization process began in Sumaré, with tax incentives. An IBM factory was installed in the Hortolândia district, on the edge of the Rodovia Jornalista Francisco Aguirre Proença. Other companies were attracted by the abundant land and tax incentives, including Armco do Brasil S/A, Dow Corning do Brasil Ltda., Fibramatex S/A Cimento e Amianto, Granjas Ito S/A, Grupo Cobrasma- Braseixos, Nativa Industrial Ltda., Nativa Construções elétricas, Westfalia Separator do Brasil, and Ingersoll Rand Brasil Ltda., among others.

=== As a district ===
The beginning of the process of turning Hortolândia into a municipality originated in 1975, although this first attempt was unsuccessful because Hortolândia did not reach 5 thousandths of the state's tax revenue and also because the President of the Republic did not give the endorsement for separation.

In the 1980s, Hortolândia was responsible for most of Sumaré's tax collection, which exceeded 60%. Popular organization followed for the pro-separation movement. The residents wanted autonomy to define the future of Hortolândia, so they began to support creation of the municipality. In 1988, with the approval of the new constitution of Brazil, the interest in becoming an autonomous district surfaced in the community leaders of Hortolândia's neighborhoods and in the population. On December 21, 1990, the Legislative Assembly of São Paulo set a plebiscite to be held in May 1991. On May 17, 1991, 97.4% voted in favor of separation in the plebiscite.

=== As a city ===
The municipality of Hortolândia is located in a strategic position, between major poles of development. Due to its privileged position, the region attracts large industrial organizations, besides being surrounded by large universities. The geographical location of the city is to the west of Campinas, bordering also the cities of Sumaré and Monte Mor. Hortolândia is the smallest municipality in the Campinas metropolitan area. The main river that cuts through the town is the Ribeirão Jacuba [pt]. The city has benefited economically from being along the Rodovia Anhanguera, bordering Campinas, and being close to the Viracopos International Airport. More recently, a continuation of Rodovia dos Bandeirantes was implemented through the city, in the region of Jardim Amanda. This highway allowed important access to the municipality through the cloverleaf at the junction with Rodovia Jornalista Francisco Aguirre Proença in an area near the IBM do Brasil company.

== Geography ==
=== Metropolitan region ===
The intense process of conurbation currently underway in the region has been creating a metropolis whose center is the city of Campinas, reaching several municipalities, such as Sumaré, Indaiatuba, Americana, Santa Bárbara d'Oeste, Valinhos, Itatiba and Paulínia, in addition to Hortolândia. The Campinas Metropolitan Region (RMC) was created by State Complementary Law 870, of June 19, 2000, and is currently composed of 19 municipalities, being the ninth-largest urban agglomeration in Brazil, with 2,798,477 inhabitants. It is one of the most dynamic in the Brazilian economic scenario and represents 2.7% of the national Gross domestic product and 7.83% of the GDP of the state of São Paulo, that is, about 77.7 billion reais per year.

Hortolândia is part of the so-called "Expanded Metropolitan Complex", which exceeds 29 million inhabitants, approximately 75 percent of the entire population of the state of São Paulo. The metropolitan regions of Campinas and São Paulo already form the first megalopolis (or macrometropolis) in the Southern Hemisphere, uniting 65 municipalities that together contain more than 12% of the Brazilian population.

=== Relief and hydrography ===
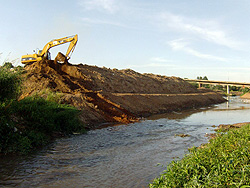
Photo of the enlargement of the Ribeirão Jacuba.

The soil is formed by the decomposition of eruptive rocks, with low density drainage and soils varying from red to yellow latosols, suitable for mechanised agriculture. There are also sandy soils suitable for pastures and occasional crops. In some stretches the layers are sedimentary and the sandstone substrate makes the soil more impoverished, noticeably susceptible to erosion. These characteristics are more noticeable where the terrain is more wavy.

The hydrographic basin of the Piracicaba River, the basin in which Hortolândia and the region are located, covers the southeastern part of the state of São Paulo and the extreme south of Minas Gerais and is the main source of water extraction for consumption in the Metropolitan Region of Campinas. The main river that cuts through the municipality is Ribeirão Jacuba.

=== Climate ===
The Köppen climate classification of the region is humid subtropical climate (Cwa), with decreased rainfall in winter and an average annual temperature of 21.6 °C, having dry and mild winters (rarely too cold) and rainy summers with moderately high temperatures. The warmest month, February, has an average temperature of 24.5 °C, with a maximum average of 30.1 °C and a minimum of 18.9 °C. The coldest month, July, averages 17.8 °C, with a maximum average of 25.0 °C and a minimum average of 10.7 °C. Autumn and spring are transitional seasons.

The average annual rainfall is 1384.3 mm, with August being the driest month, when only 21.0 mm occurs. In January, the rainiest month, the average is 279.6 mm. Dry seasons and Indian summers in the middle of the rainy season are also common records of bush fires, especially in the rural area of the city, which contributes to deforestation and the release of pollutants into the atmosphere, further damaging the air quality.

Climate data for Hortolândia
Month	Jan	Feb	Mar	Apr	May	Jun	Jul	Aug	Sep	Oct	Nov	Dec	Year
Mean daily maximum °F	86.0	86.2	85.5	82.2	78.6	76.5	77.0	80.6	82.4	83.5	84.6	84.6	82.2
Mean daily minimum °F	65.7	66.0	64.6	59.7	54.9	52.2	51.3	53.6	57.2	60.3	61.9	64.4	59.4
Average precipitation inches	11.01	7.52	6.36	2.33	2.74	1.47	1.31	0.83	3.12	4.50	5.68	7.67	50.86
Mean daily maximum °C	30.0	30.1	29.7	27.9	25.9	24.7	25.0	27.0	28.0	28.6	29.2	29.2	27.9
Mean daily minimum °C	18.7	18.9	18.1	15.4	12.7	11.2	10.7	12.0	14.0	15.7	16.6	18.0	15.2
Average precipitation mm	279.6	190.9	161.6	59.3	69.5	37.4	33.2	21.0	79.2	114.2	144.3	194.7	1,291.8
Source: Centro de Pesquisas Meteorológicas e Climáticas Aplicadas à Agricultura (Cepagri)

=== Ecology and environment ===
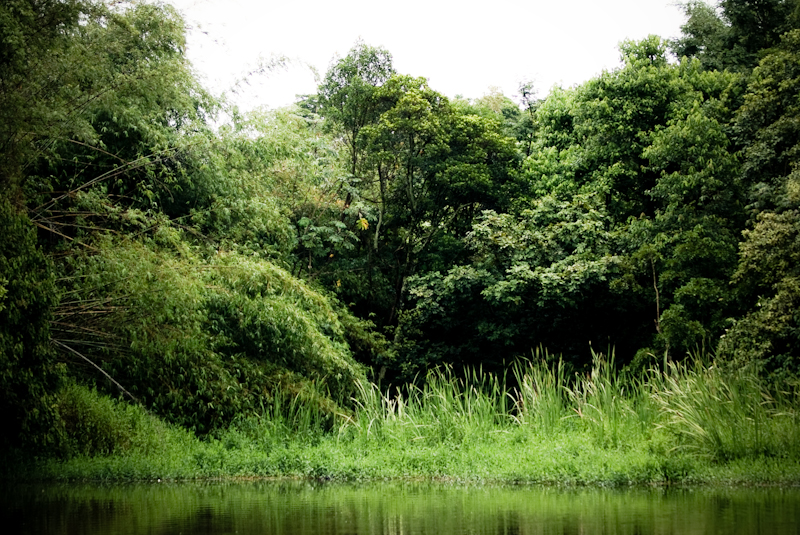
Green areas in Hortolândia.

Most of the original vegetation that existed in the city in the Atlantic Forest was ravaged. Like 13 other municipalities of the Metropolitan Region of Campinas, the city suffers a serious environmental stress, and Hortolândia, along with Santa Bárbara d'Oeste and Sumaré, is considered one of the most critical areas subject to flooding and silting, with less than 2% of vegetation. This is the result of a historical process of land use by monocultures such as coffee and cattle breeding.

To try to reverse this situation, several projects have been and are being carried out and planned, such as the construction of wildlife corridors, despite the fact that the remaining forest fragments suffer continuously from the pressure of irregular urban settlements. There are also several environmental projects to combat the destruction of the riparian forests and an environmental protection area is being created to contain the conurbation with neighboring cities. Four environmental parks have also been created, which are natural reserves that still provide visitors and schools with environmental awareness programs.

== Demographics ==
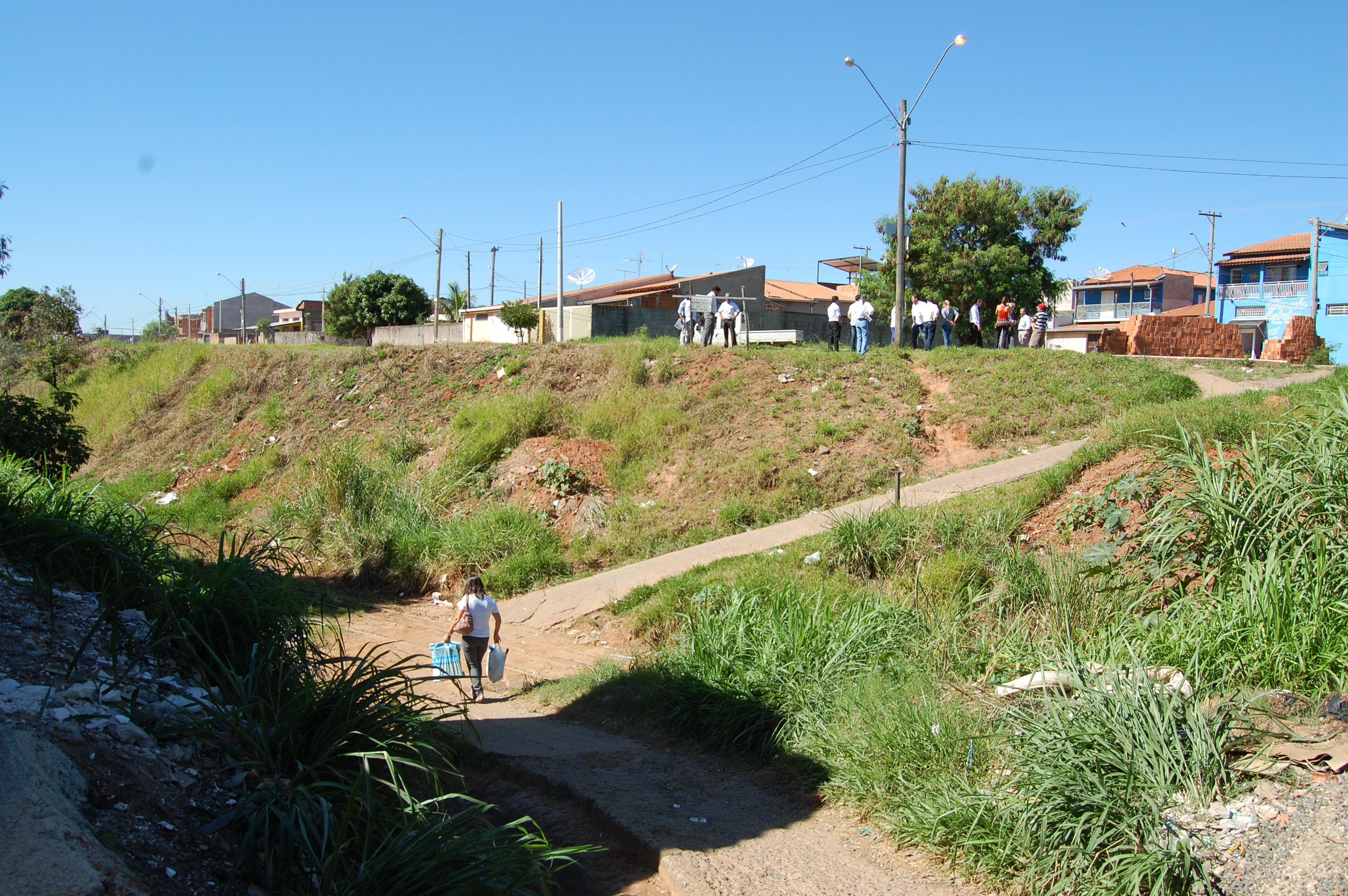
Abandoned area on the outskirts of the city.

=== Population ===
Historical population (municipality)
Year	Population	%±
2000	152,523	—
2010	192,692	26.3%
2022	236,641	22.8%
Est. 2024	247,331	4.5%

In 2010, the municipality's population was counted by the Brazilian Institute of Geography and Statistics (IBGE) at 192,692 inhabitants, making it the 40th most populous in the state and the fifth most populous in the Metropolitan Region of Campinas, with a population density of 3,146.29 inhabitants per km². According to the 2010 census, 97,241 inhabitants were men and 94,984 inhabitants were women. According to the same census, all inhabitants lived in the urban area.

The Municipal Human Development Index (HDI-M) of Hortolândia is considered medium by the United Nations Development Programme (UNDP). Its value is 0.79, the 243rd highest in the entire state of São Paulo (out of 645 municipalities); the 328th in the entire Southeast Region of Brazil (out of 1666) and the 795th in all of Brazil (out of 5507). The city has most indicators high and above the national average according to the UNDP.

=== Poverty, inequality and growth ===
According to the IBGE, in 2003 the Gini coefficient, which measures social inequality, was 0.40, where 1.00 is the worst number and 0.00 is the best. The Gini coefficient, which measures social inequality, is 0.39, where 1.00 is the worst number and 0.00 is the best. The incidence of poverty, measured by the IBGE, is 24.01%; the lower limit of poverty incidence is 17.16%, the upper limit is 30.87%, and the incidence of subjective poverty is 18.48%.

In 2010, 81.3% of the population lived above the poverty line, 6.0% were on the poverty line and 12.7% were below it. In 2000, the share of the wealthiest 20% of the city's population in total municipal income was 50.4%, 14 times higher than that of the poorest 20%, which was 3.6%; in 1991 the share of the poorest 20% was 5.0%, that is, from the beginning of the 1990s to the year 2000 there was growth in social inequality in the city.

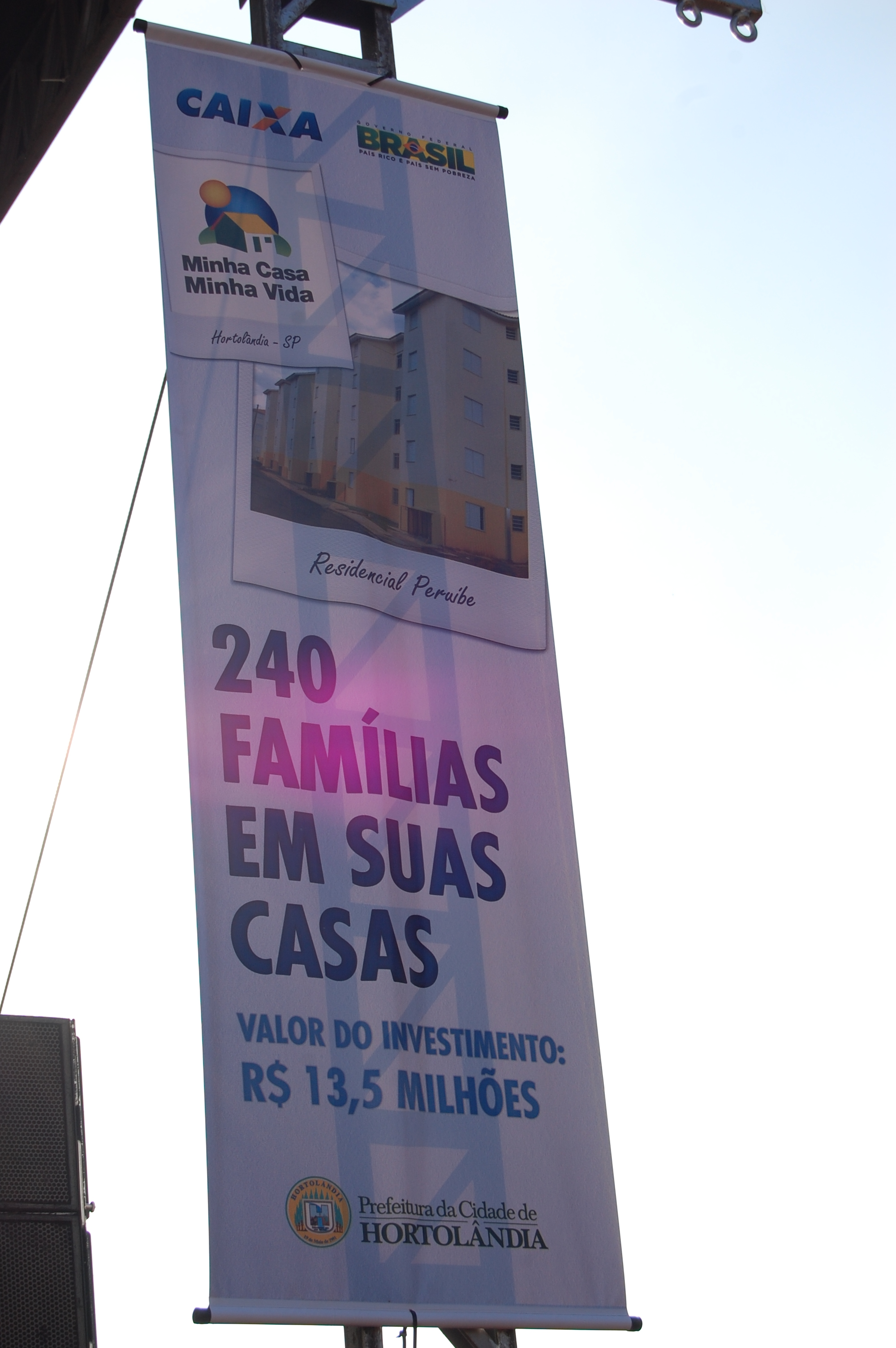
Banner announcing construction works for the Minha Casa, Minha Vida project in Hortolândia.

According to the city government, in 2008 there were records of irregular subdivisions, slums, mocambos, stilt houses, or similar settlements, and 2,934 inhabitants lived in them. Many of these are people who came from other cities or even states in search of better life opportunities in Hortolândia, but did not find work and ended up settling in subnormal clusters. According to the IBGE, in 2010 the city's favelas were Jardim Estrela, Jardim do Bosque, Jardim do Lago, Sumarezinho and an extension of Vila Real, but the city government recognizes only Vila Real as a subnormal cluster. To reverse the situation there was an attempt to remove favela residents to new houses or even grant housing assistance to some families. Other projects include the construction of housing complexes (COHABs) in vacant spaces in the city, in accordance with the guidelines of the Master Plan of Hortolândia.

=== Religion ===
Most residents of Hortolândia declare themselves Catholic, although today it is possible to find dozens of different Protestant denominations in the city, as well as the practice of Buddhism, Islam, Spiritism, among others. The Jewish, Latter-day Saint, and Afro-Brazilian religious communities are also significant. According to data from the 2010 census carried out by the IBGE, the population of Hortolândia is composed of: Catholics (49.43%), Evangelicals (35.76%), people with no religion (9.97%), Spiritists (1.10%) and the remainder divided among other religions. According to the Brazilian census of 2022, the city's religious composition was 40.64% Catholic, 39.59% Evangelical or Protestant, 1.03% Spiritist, 1.02% Umbandist or Candomblé follower, 0% traditional religions, 5.89% other religions, 11.63% irreligious, 0.02% unknown and 0.17% undeclared.

==== Roman Catholic Church ====
According to the division made by the Catholic Church, the municipality is located in the Ecclesiastical Province of Campinas, based in Campinas. It is also part of the Roman Catholic Archdiocese of Campinas, created as a diocese on June 7, 1908 and elevated to an archdiocese on April 19, 1958.

In the city, the communities are governed by five parishes, corresponding to the regions of Centro (Parish of the Rosary), Campos Verdes Region (Our Lady of Aparecida Parish), Jardim Amanda Region (Saint Lucy Parish), Jardim Rosolen Region (Our Lady of Aparecida Parish) and Santa Clara Region (Saint John Paul II Parish). The main Catholic temple is Hortolândia's mother church, the Church of Our Lady of the Rosary.

==== Reformed churches ====
The city has the most diverse Protestant or Reformed creeds, such as the Lutheran Church, the Presbyterian Church, the Seventh-day Adventist Church, the Anglican Episcopal Church, the Baptist churches, and the Methodist Church, as well as Pentecostal denominations such as the Assemblies of God, Christian Congregation in Brazil and neo-Pentecostal movements such as Comunidade Cristã Novo Nascimento, Comunidade Evangélica Sara Nossa Terra, the Igreja do Evangelho Quadrangular, the World Church of the Power of God, and the Universal Church of the Kingdom of God, among others. As noted above, according to the IBGE, in 2010 35.76% of the population were Protestants. Of this total, 9.52% belong to Evangelical churches of Pentecostal origin; 2.87% belong to missionary Evangelical churches; 0.64% belong to Evangelical churches without institutional affiliation; and 0.39% belong to other Evangelical religions.

There are also Christians of several other denominations, such as Jehovah's Witnesses (who represent 1.25% of the inhabitants) and members of the Church of Jesus Christ of Latter-day Saints (0.20%).

=== Ethnic groups ===
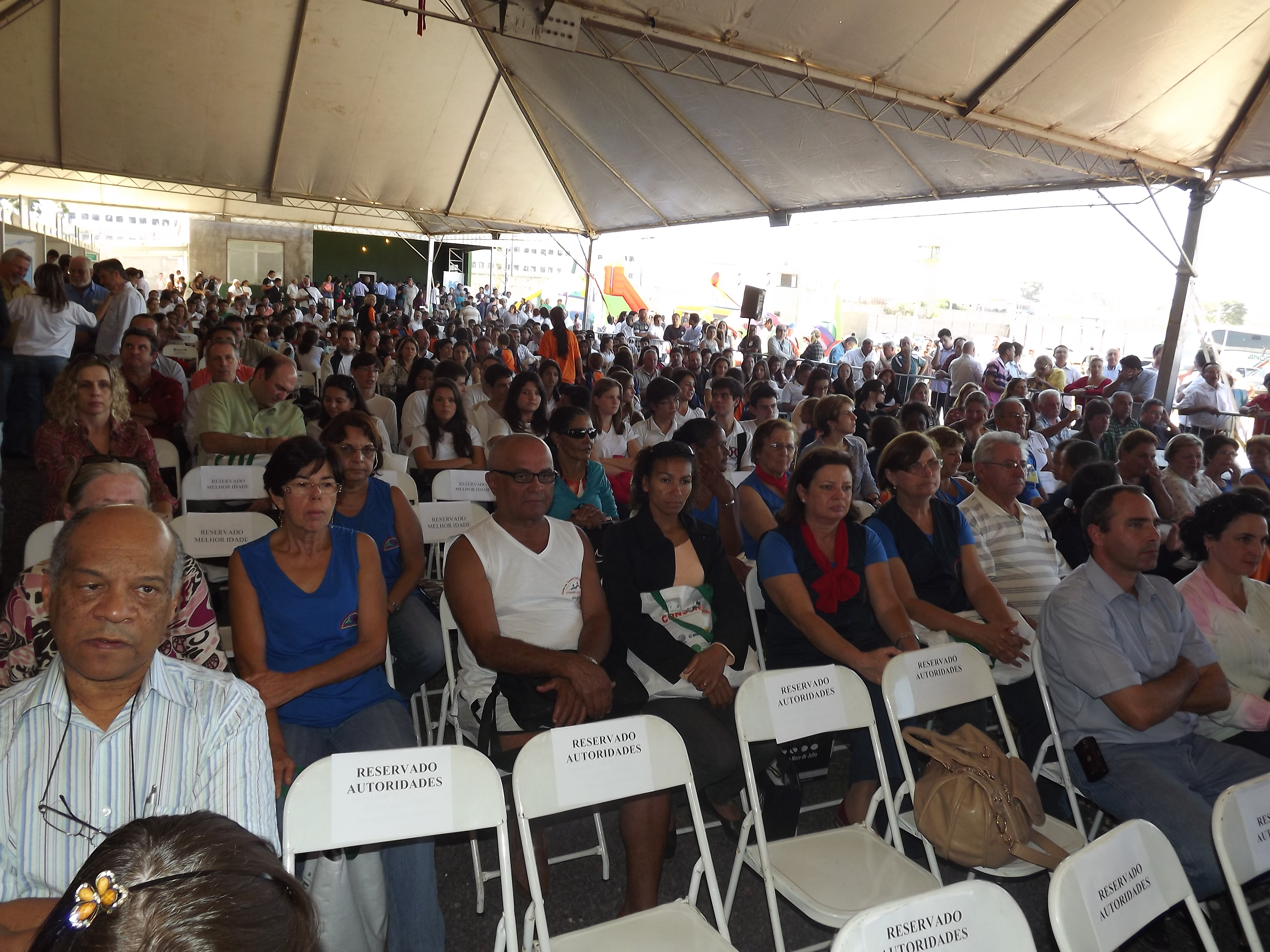
Sample of the population of Hortolândia, during an event on the outskirts of the city.

In 2010, according to data from that year's IBGE Census, the population of Hortolândia was composed of 103,517 whites (53.72%); 13,433 blacks (6.97%); 74,353 pardos (38.59%); 1,184 Asians (0.61%); and 205 Indigenous people (0.11%).

The arrival of people from other countries was more common at the beginning of the 20th century, and immigration contributed to agriculture. Many immigrants came in search of work mainly in coffee plantations, and they also helped strengthen trade; until 1950 the current municipality, when it belonged to Sumaré, was composed basically of Italians and Portuguese. During the 1980s and 90s, the arrival of people from other parts of Brazil stood out, especially from the vicinity of the Metropolitan Region of Campinas, as a result of its development. In 1970, when it was still a district, it had 4,600 inhabitants, while in 1991 the population was already more than 33 thousand people. On the other hand, in 2010, 281 people left Hortolândia to go to other countries, 58 of them to the United States (20.64%), 56 to Japan (19.93%), 33 (11.74%) to Portugal, 30 (10.68%) to Spain and 18 to Sweden (6.41%).

== Politics and administration ==
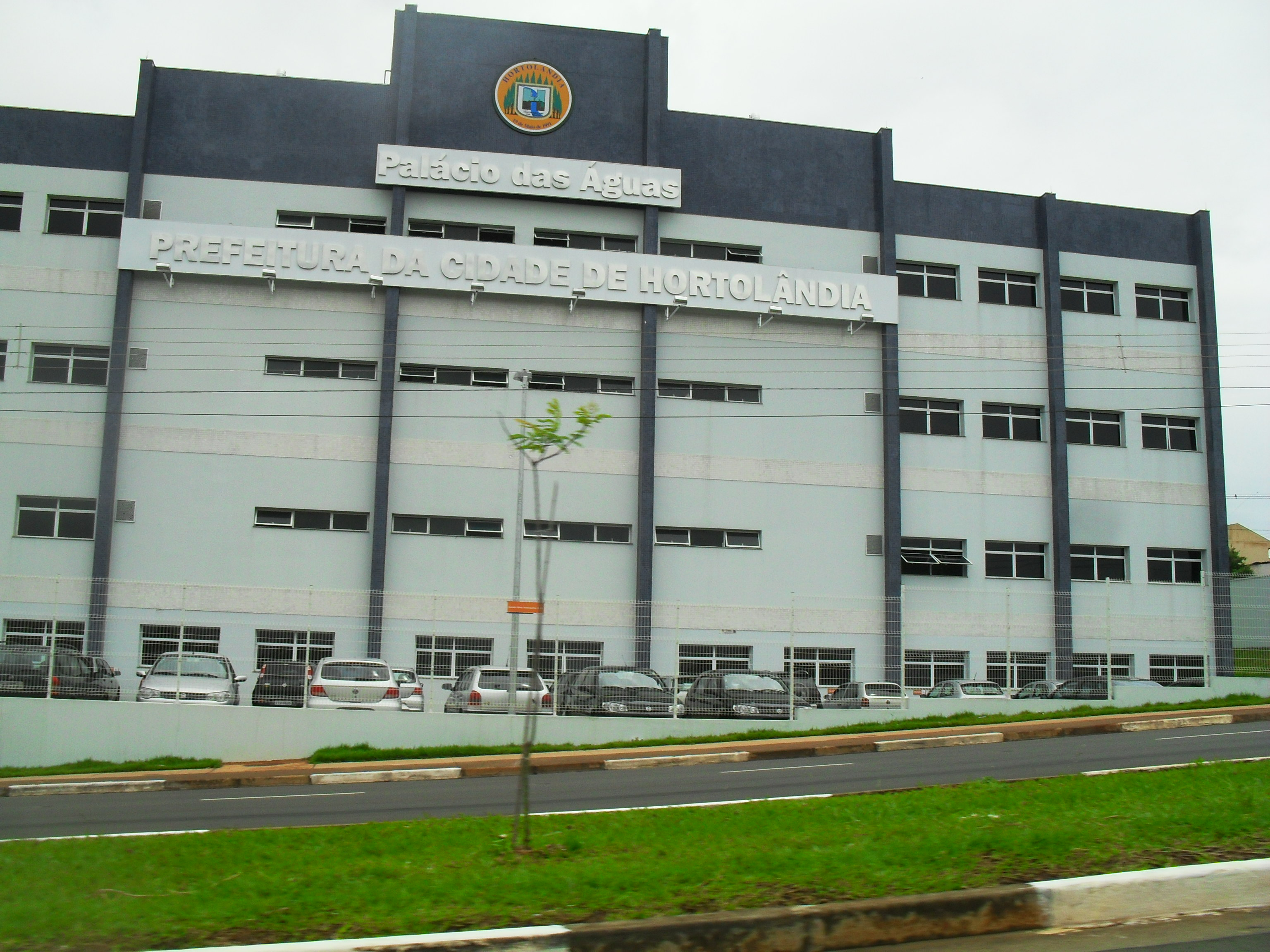
Palácio das Águas - Municipal Government of Hortolândia.

The municipal administration is carried out by the executive branch and the legislative branch. The first to govern the municipality was Luís Antônio Dias da Silva, of the Brazilian Democratic Movement Party (PMDB), who was elected after the first elections were held in the city. The current mayor is José Nazareno Zezé Gomes, of the Republicanos, who assumed office as mayor after the death of elected mayor Angelo Augusto Perugini due to complications from COVID-19, who had won the 2020 Brazilian municipal elections. Because Hortolândia had fewer than 200 thousand voters and none of the candidates received less than 50% of the total votes in the first round, there was no runoff. In February 2021, the city's mayor Angelo Augusto Perugini was removed from office by the City Council after testing positive for COVID-19 and being admitted to Samaritano Hospital in Campinas, then transferred to a hospital in São Paulo; after being hospitalized for two months, the elected mayor died on April 1, 2021. The city's vice mayor, José Nazareno Zeze Gomes (Zezé), officially assumed office.

The legislative branch is constituted by the council, composed of 19 councilors elected for four-year terms (in observance of article 29 of the Constitution) and is composed as follows: six seats for the Workers' Party (PT); three seats for the Brazilian Socialist Party (PSB); three seats for the Republican Progressive Party (PRP); two seats for the Brazilian Social Democracy Party (PSDB); two seats for the Free Fatherland Party (PPL); one seat for the Brazilian Democratic Movement Party (PMDB); one for the Green Party; and one for the Party of the Republic (PR). It is the responsibility of the chamber to draft and vote on laws fundamental to the administration and the executive, especially the participatory budget (Budget Guidelines Law).

The municipality is also governed by an organic law, which was promulgated on July 9, 1993 and entered into force on that same date, and it is part of the Comarca of Sumaré. It had 132,379 electors in June 2012, which represented 0.424% of the total in the state of São Paulo. It has one sister city, namely Xi'an, China. Hortolândia is divided into 78 official bairros, which are distributed among four Regional Administration units: AR Jardim Amanda, AR Rosolém, AR Jardim Nova Hortolândia and AR Centro.

== Economy ==
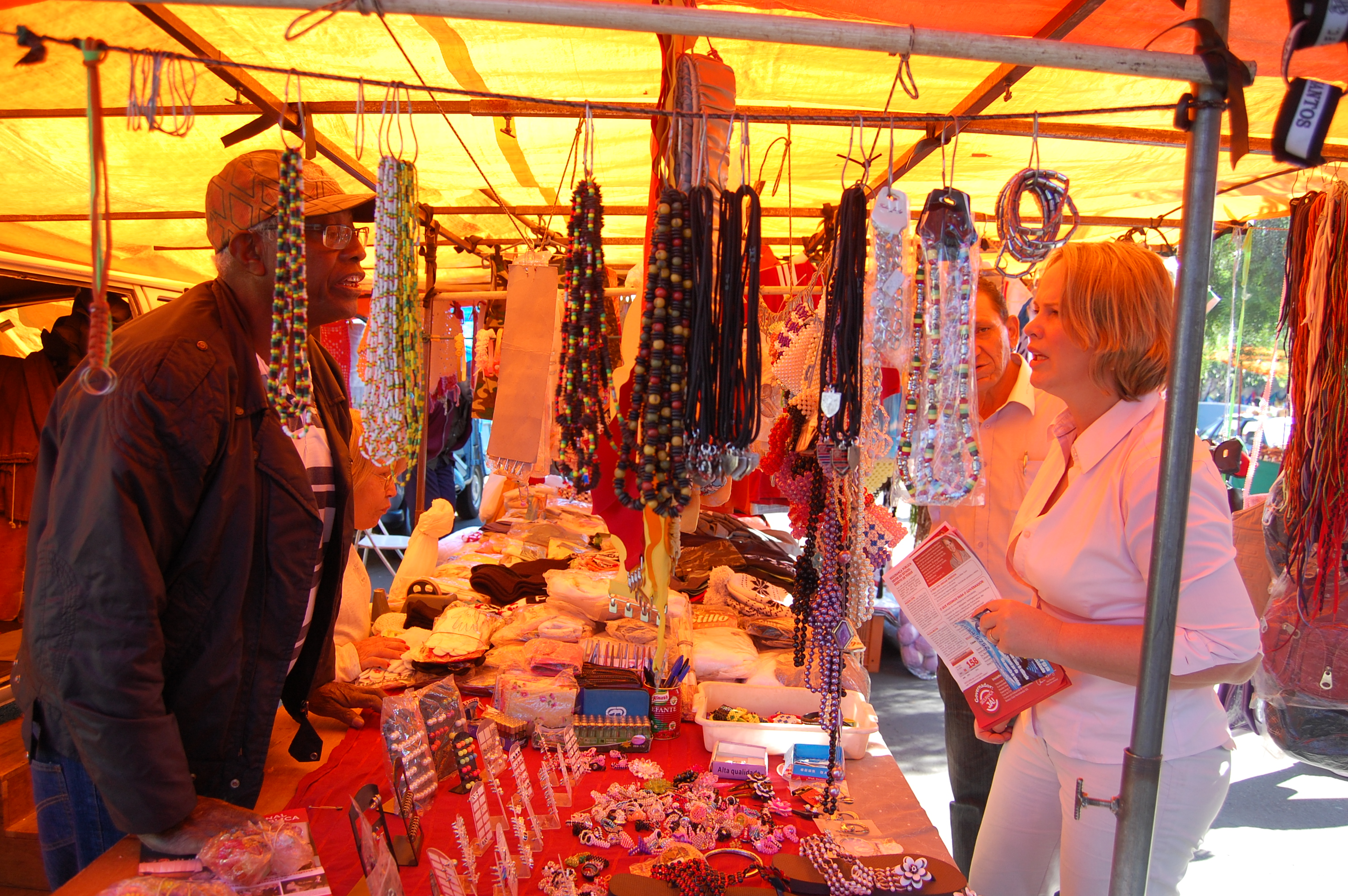
Street market in Hortolândia.

The gross domestic product (GDP) of Hortolândia is the fifth largest in the Metropolitan Region of Campinas, the 27th largest in the state of São Paulo and the 89th in the entire country. According to IBGE data referring to 2010, the municipality's GDP was R$ 6,226,404 million. 490,274 thousand are taxes on products net of subsidies at current prices. The per capita GDP is R$ 23,588.03 and in 2000 the income Human Development Index (HDI) was 0.7, while that of Brazil in that year was 0.723.

According to the IBGE, in 2010 the city had 4,736 local units and 4,674 active companies and commercial establishments. 50,188 workers were classified as total employed personnel and 44,204 were categorized as salaried employed personnel. Salaries together with other remuneration totaled 1,587,615 reais and the average monthly salary in the entire municipality was 6.1 minimum wages. The unemployment rate of the economically active population is 4%.

Primary sector

Agriculture is the least relevant sector of Hortolândia's economy. Of the city's total GDP, 4,152 thousand reais are the gross added value of agriculture and livestock. According to the IBGE in 2010, the municipality had about 100 cattle, 24 horses and 39 pigs. Twelve cows were milked, and milk production reached 22 thousand liters that year. There were no birds being raised for agricultural purposes and there were also no large crops producing for profit, according to the IBGE. The city stands out only in family farming, as it is one of the cities in the Metropolitan Region of Campinas that buys the most products coming directly from small farmers in the region, supplying food for the city's Community Kitchen, and there are 5 thousand families registered with Hortolândia's welfare entities.

Around 1866, the area of the current municipality was divided into agricultural properties. This region, which then belonged to Campinas, stood out in the production of coffee, cotton and sugar, in addition to subsistence crops. However, in the mid-1970s, a major industrialization process began there (now Sumaré), with tax incentives, until agriculture almost completely disappeared.

Secondary sector

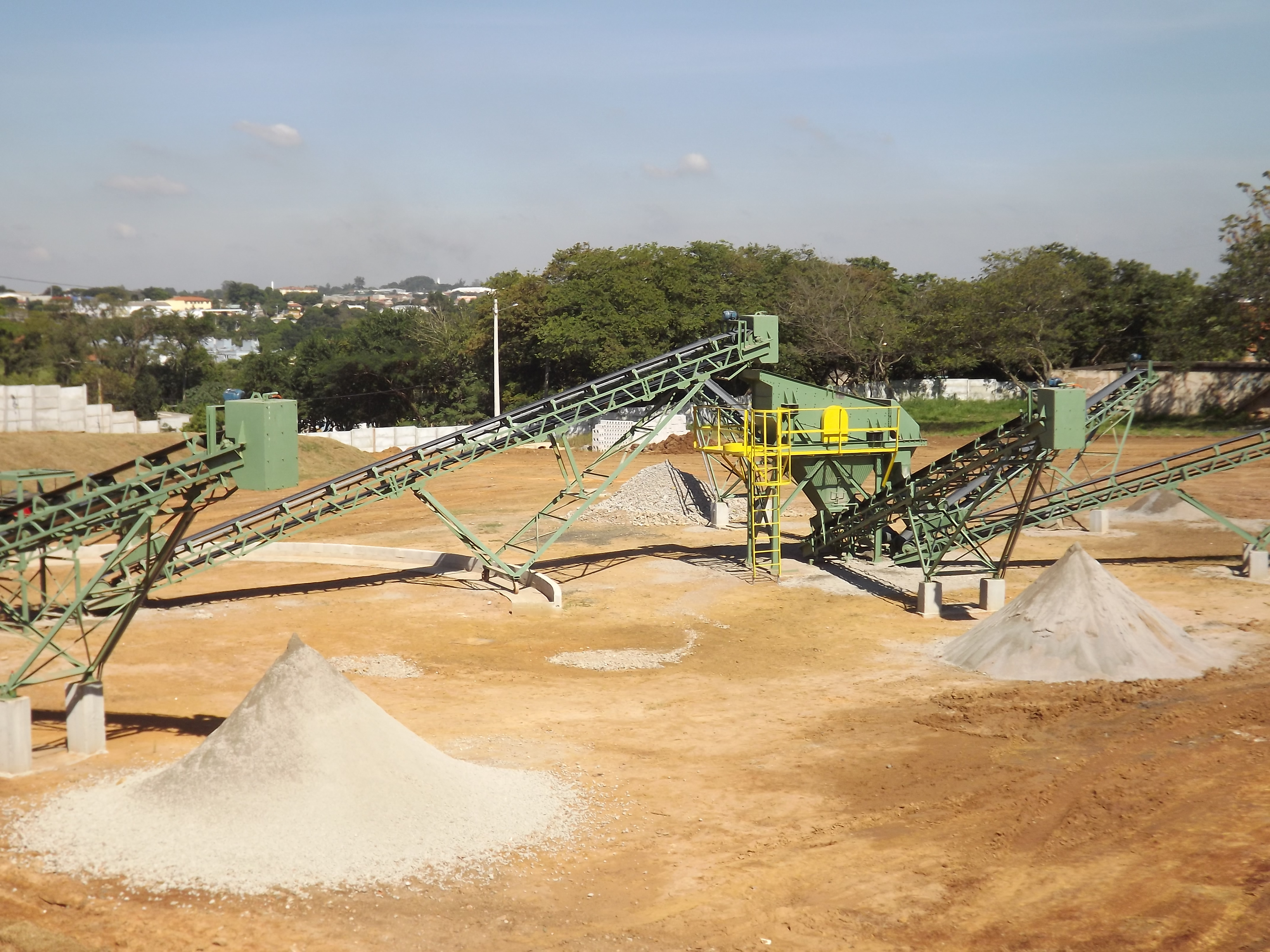
Waste recycling plant in Hortolândia.

Industry, at present, is the second most relevant sector for the municipality's economy. 1,605,035 reais of municipal GDP are gross value added by industry (secondary sector). Its industrial structure is also formed by high-technology companies that require specialized labor. With more than 120 years of historical records, eighteen of them as a municipality, Hortolândia has consolidated itself in the Metropolitan Region of Campinas (RMC) as a city with great economic development. The city is home to the multinational IBM, which settled there in 1972. The company is located in the Tech Town industrial condominium, which houses other large enterprises. Hortolândia is also home to Dow Corning, a silicone manufacturing company, as well as Belgo-Mineira, Magneti Marelli, Magneti Marelli and the pharmaceutical laboratory EMS. In 2007, other large companies settled in the municipality, such as Dell, one of the world's leading computer manufacturers, and Wickbold, in the food sector. According to the city government, in 2007 45% of the population worked in the industrial sector.

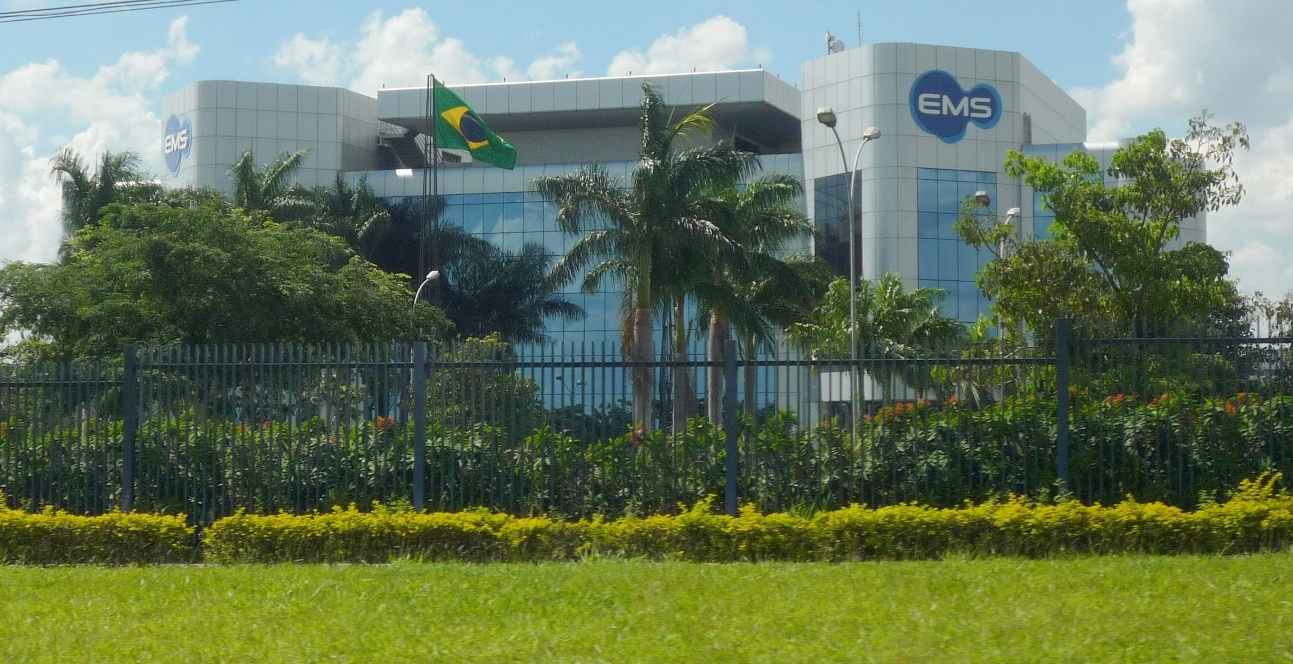
Headquarters of EMS in Hortolândia

Industrial development is due to the city's privileged location within the state. Hortolândia's proximity to Viracopos International Airport, the presence of important highways around it and the fact that it is in a region with a high concentration of development in the country, considered a scientific and industrial hub, are primary and decisive factors in attracting enterprises. In the 1980s, when it was still a district of Sumaré, Hortolândia housed industries that generated 60% of Sumaré's fiscal added value. In the second half of the 1990s, Hortolândia's fiscal added value jumped from R$ 870 million in 1995 to R$ 1.2 billion in 2000, with a small decrease in 1997, but growing again in subsequent years, mainly due to the expansion of the industrial sector. Between 2005 and 2008, the size of the municipality's economy grew 105%, reaching R$ 3.5 billion.

Tertiary sector

The provision of services yields 2,756,277 thousand reais to the municipal GDP. In recent years, growth in the local trade and service sector has been perceived. According to the General Registry of Employed and Unemployed Persons (CAGED), trade is currently responsible for generating most of the formally registered jobs in the city. Between 2005 and August 2011 the sector generated about 20 thousand job openings, and 2,498 positions were opened between January and August 2011.

Large retail companies, major commercial establishments and multinational companies in the commerce sector have recently set up in the city, such as Tenda Atacado, Pernambucanas, Americanas, Marisa, McDonald's, Burger King, Griletto, and Subway, among others, inside Shopping Hortolândia, at the end of 2011, and Magazine Luiza located next to Supermercado Paulistão Hortolândia. In Hortolândia's Commercial Center a significant share of local commercial activity is concentrated, and profits grow by up to 30% at special times, such as Christmas. Another important commercial hub of the municipality is Shopping Hortolândia, inaugurated on November 24, 2011.

== Urban structure ==
=== Health ===
In 2009, the municipality had 37 health establishments among hospitals, emergency rooms, health posts and dental services, 24 of them public and 13 private. In them the city had 68 beds for hospitalization, all of them in public facilities. In 2011, 99.6% of children under 1 year of age had their vaccination records up to date. In 2010, 2,743 births were registered, and the infant mortality rate was 8.2 for every thousand children under one year of age, and 99.7% of all live births had their deliveries assisted by qualified health professionals. In that same year, 15.1% of all pregnant women were girls under 20 years old. 5,464 children were weighed by the Family Health Program, and 0.5% of them were malnourished.

The Municipal Health Department is the body directly linked to the municipal government of Hortolândia and is responsible for the maintenance and operation of the Sistema Único de Saúde (SUS), as well as for creating policies, programs and projects aimed at municipal health. Among the support and primary care services are the Family Health Program (PSF), the Basic Health Units (UBS) and the Mobile Emergency Care Service (SAMU). Services developed by the municipal government also include the zoonosis center, responsible for controlling diseases transmitted by animals, and the health surveillance division composed of the epidemiological health and health surveillance sections. The main hospital is the Municipal Hospital and Maternity Governador Mário Covas, located in the Jardim Mirante neighborhood.

=== Education ===
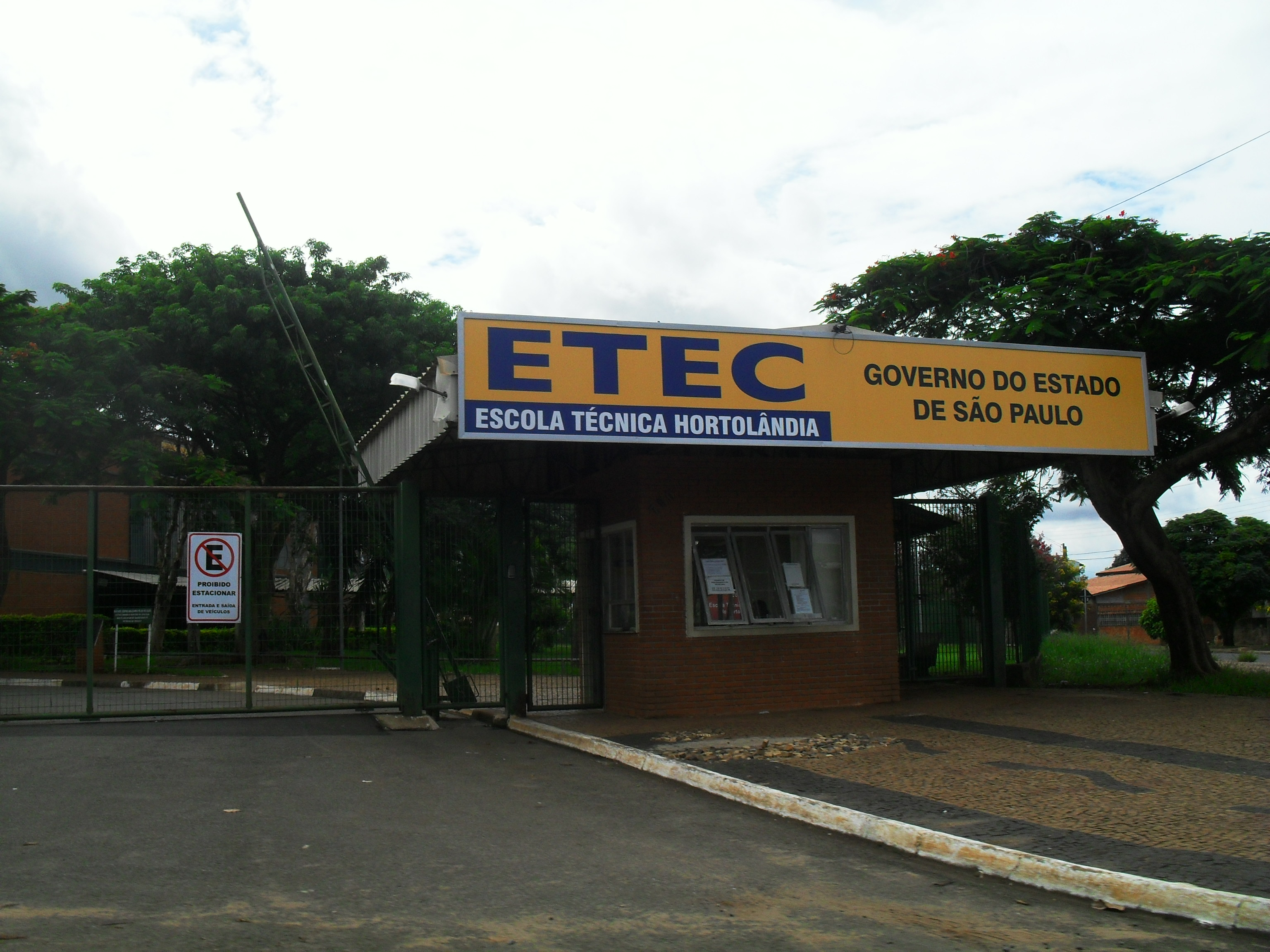
Technical School of Hortolândia

The average Basic Education Development Index (IDEB) among Hortolândia's public schools was, in 2009, 5.0 (on an evaluation scale from 1 to 10), with the score obtained by 5th-year students (former 4th grade) being 5.4 and by 9th-year students (former 8th grade) being 4.6; the value for public schools throughout Brazil was 4.0. The IDEB for the 5th year was the 1086th highest in the country, while that of the 9th year was the 656th. The Human Development Index (HDI) value for education was 0.883 (classified as high), while that of Brazil is 0.849.

The municipality had, in 2009, approximately 45,584 enrollments in public and private networks. According to the IBGE, in that same year, of the 69 elementary schools, 26 belonged to the state public network, 34 to the municipal public network and 9 were private schools. Among the 25 secondary education institutions, 22 belonged to the state public network and 3 to private networks. In 2010, 16.0% of children aged 7 to 14 were not attending elementary school. The completion rate among young people aged 15 to 17 that year was 66.2%. The literacy rate of the population aged 15 or older, in 2010, was 99.1%. In 2006, for every 100 girls in elementary school, there were 102 boys.

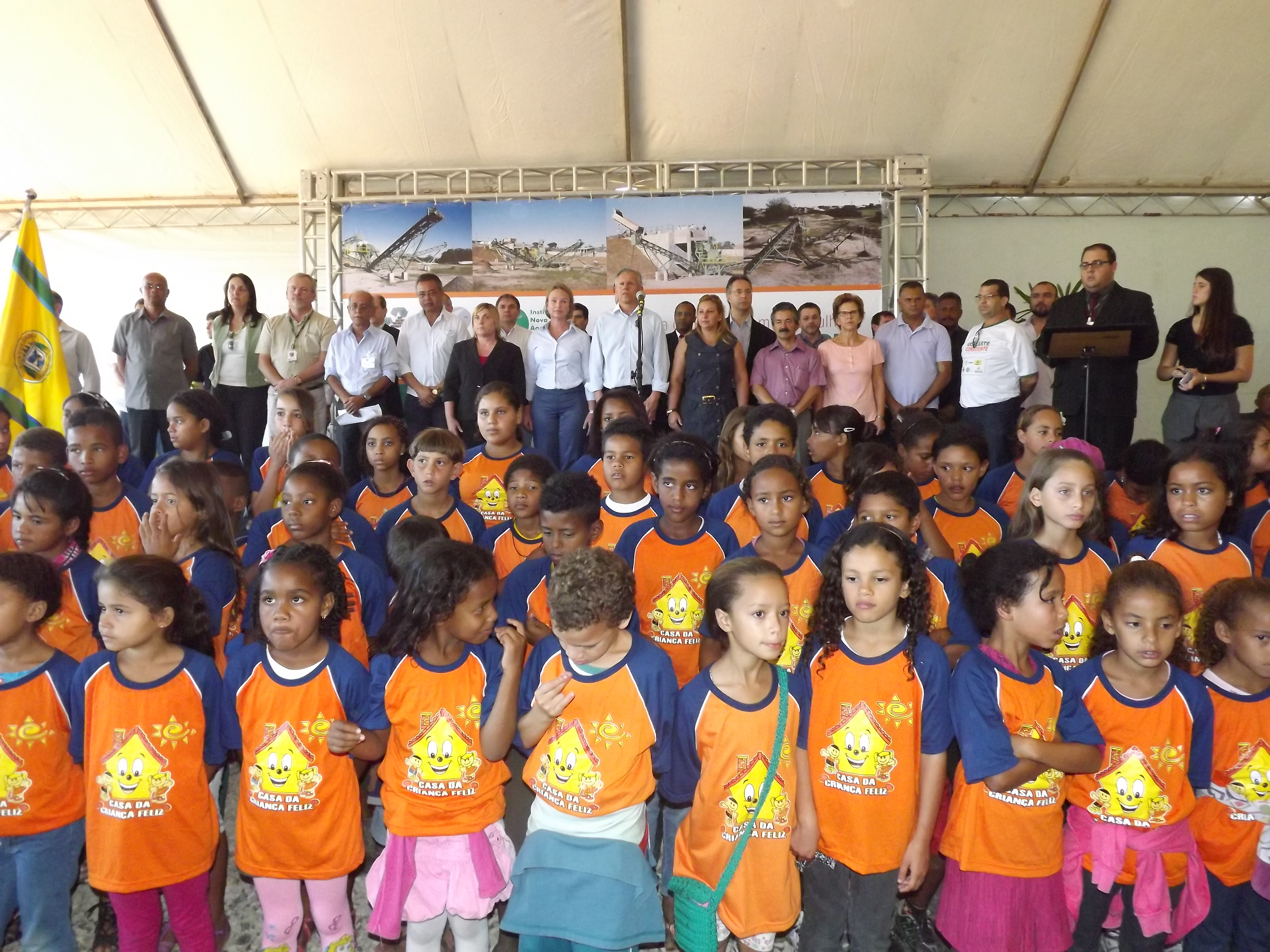
Children from a municipal school in Hortolândia.

The Municipal Department of Education aims to coordinate and advise administratively and pedagogically the school system of Hortolândia. Examples of programs coordinated by the Department with a focus on the population are Youth and Adult Education (EJA), which is a free education network aimed at adults who have not completed elementary school, and the Special Education network, where students with physical disabilities are guided by specialized teachers.

The city currently has two higher-education institutions: a campus of the Adventist University Center of São Paulo (Unasp), a confessional-private institution that offers all levels, from early childhood education to higher education, and; a campus of the Federal Institute of Education, Science and Technology of São Paulo (IFSP), a public institution offering higher and technical courses in various areas of technology. In addition, it has distance education centers of the Faculdade de Comunicação Social de Hortolândia (FCSH), the Faculdade Internacional de Curitiba (Facinter), the Faculdade Paulista de Administração e Ciências Contábeis de Hortolândia (Fapacch), the Anhanguera-Uniderp University and the Paulista University (UNIP Interativa).

Education in Hortolândia in numbers
Level	Enrollments	Teachers	Schools (total)
Pre-school education	5,187	215	40
Primary education	32,148	1,257	69
Secondary education	8,249	482	25

=== Science and technology ===
Hortolândia has one technical school, ETEC Hortolândia, consisting of technical courses in the areas of computer science, administration, secretarial studies and nutrition. The computer science course stands out, qualifying technical professionals in the area of programming. Curricular components of software development are taught in the C and Java languages. Graduates leave qualified for the labor market in information technology, especially in software programming. The city was also included in the expansion plan of the federal professional and technological education network of the Ministry of Education, being one of the hub cities for the implementation of the new decentralized units of the CEFET-SP. In the RMC, only Hortolândia and Campinas were selected for implementation of the new units in the MEC plan in 2010.

The city is also home to a technology park, whose objective is to collaborate in the scientific and technological development of the region, attracting companies that invest in research and development of products aimed at the industrial and technological sectors, such as the Service Center of IBM, Dell Computers and the Chinese company ZTE.

=== Crime and public safety ===
Public security provision in Hortolândia is provided by several bodies, and the Public Security Department is responsible for the sector. The municipal government maintains a Municipal Guard, whose function is to protect the Municipality's assets, services and facilities and collaborate with the municipal inspection body. The Military Police, a state force, is responsible for ostensive policing, bank, environmental, prison, school and special-event patrols, and also carries out social integration actions. The Civil Police aims to combat and investigate occurrences of crimes and offenses.

The drop in homicides from causes related to urban violence is due to a set of policies that increased repression, in addition to measures taken by the Military Police of São Paulo State (PMSP), such as the Digital Occurrence Record (RDO), adopted in 46 more municipalities in the state of São Paulo. The RDO allows police reports (BOs) made in police units to be standardized via intranet, stored in databases and consulted by other police agencies.

=== Housing, services and communication ===
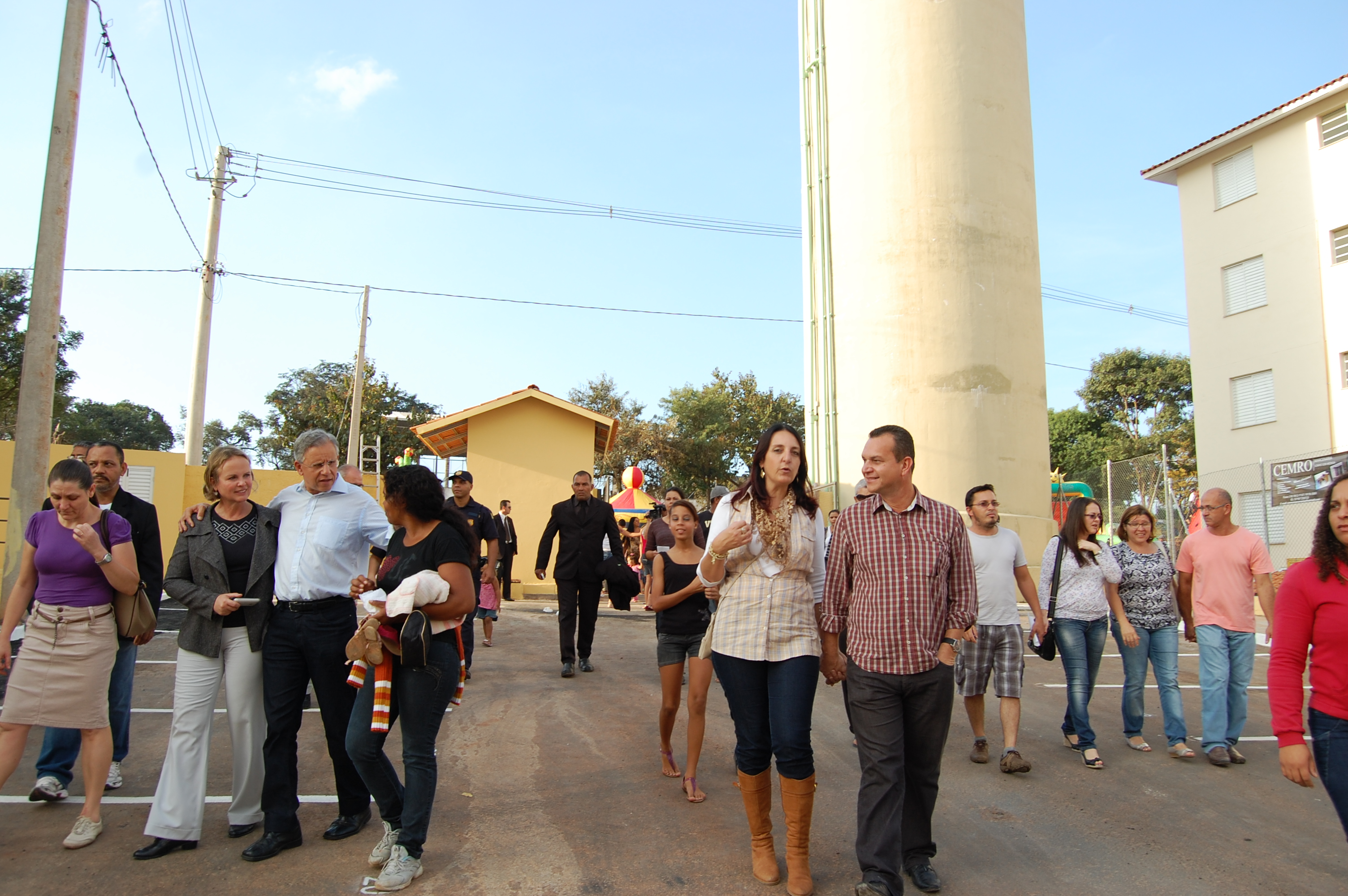
Complex of low-income houses being inaugurated in the city in June 2012.

In 2010, according to the IBGE, the city had 55,393 permanent private households, of which 53,865 were houses, 1,217 were apartments, 177 were village houses or in condominiums, and 134 were rooms or tenements. Of the total number of households, 39,496 were owner-occupied properties, of which 37,012 were fully paid off, 2,484 were being purchased and 11,526 were rented; 3,227 properties were ceded, 274 by employers and 2,953 ceded in another manner. 1,144 were occupied in another way. A large part of the municipality has treated water, electricity, sewage, urban cleaning, fixed telephony and mobile telephony. In that year, 98.14% of households were served by the general water supply network; 99.64% of homes had some type of garbage collection and 99.6% of residences had a bathroom for exclusive use of the household.

Water supply in Hortolândia, as in much of the state of São Paulo, is carried out by Companhia de Saneamento Básico do Estado de São Paulo. The company took over sanitation services in Hortolândia in 1997, at a time when the municipality did not have sewage collection and water supply was precarious. In September 2011 there were about 50 thousand water connections in the city, and currently (2012) about 20% of the sewage produced is treated. There are two treatment plants, one inaugurated on September 9, 2000, with capacity to store more than 17 million liters of water, and another inaugurated in April 2012, with capacity to treat up to 300 liters per second.

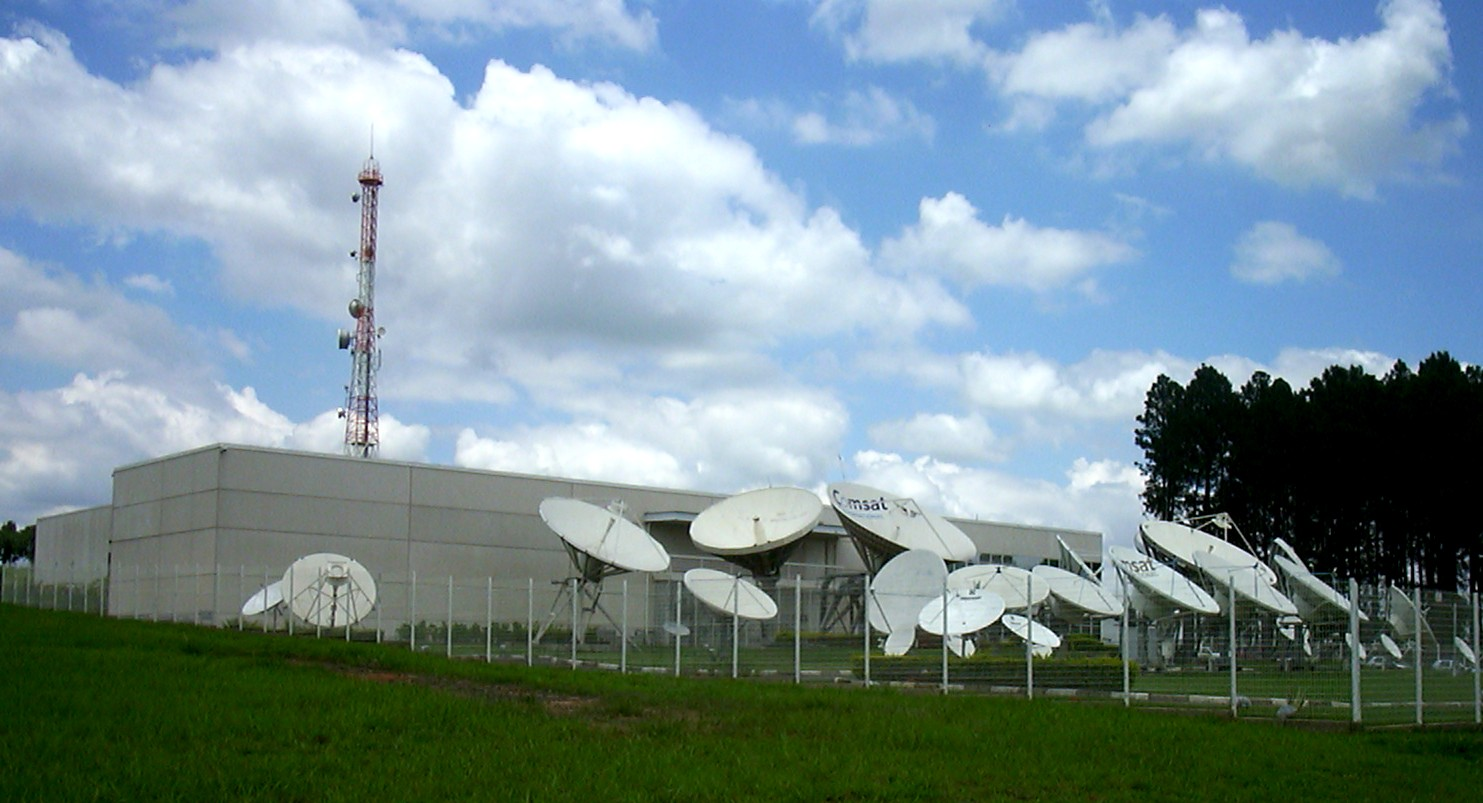
COMSAT earth stations in Hortolândia, a U.S. satellite communications systems company.

The company responsible for supplying electricity in Hortolândia is Companhia Paulista de Força e Luz (CPFL Paulista), which also serves another 234 municipalities in the Interior of São Paulo. In 2010, 99.92% of the municipality's households were served by the service.

In telecommunications, the city was served by Telecomunicações de São Paulo (Telesp). The automatic telephone system was inaugurated in the city in 1979 by Telesp, which also implemented the direct distance dialing (DDD) in 1979 with area code (0192). In the 1990s the city's DDD code was changed to (019), to standardize the telephone system with mobile telephony that was being implemented throughout the state. In July 1998, Telesp was acquired by Telefónica, which adopted the Vivo brand in 2012. The company is currently an operator of cell phones, fixed lines, internet (fiber optics/4G) and television (satellite and cable).

Mobile telephone service, by mobile phone, is offered by several operators. Some points already have wireless network (wireless internet). There are also Internet dial-up and broadband (ADSL) services offered by several free and paid access providers. Hortolândia's area code (DDD) is 019 and the city's postal code (CEP) ranges from 13183-001 to 13189-999.

There are several channels in the Very High Frequency (VHF) and Ultra High Frequency (UHF) bands, with affiliated broadcasters in the city itself or in nearby cities. Hortolândia also has newspapers in circulation, with "Página Popular" and "Jornal de Hortolândia" produced in the city, and it is also within the circulation area of Correio Popular, Folha de S.Paulo and Spasso Comercial. Some of the main radio stations are Rádio Jovem7, Rádio Anexo e Reflexo, Rádio Vida, Rádio Vida Web and Web Vinil. In the communications area, the municipality stands out for hosting in the Tech Town industrial condominium a complex of the Communications Satellite Corporation (COMSAT), one of the world's leading satellite communications systems companies, headquartered in the United States.

=== Transport ===
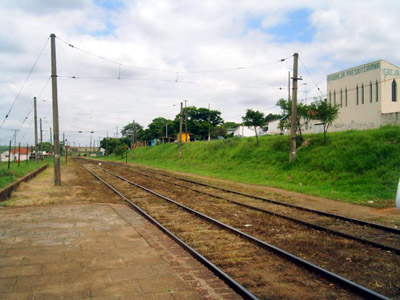
Railway line that passes through Hortolândia.

Aviation

Hortolândia does not have commercial airports in its territory; however, Viracopos International Airport is located in the municipality of Campinas, about 30 km from the center of Hortolândia, in the same Metropolitan Region of Campinas, serving the entire region with daily flights to São Paulo and other destinations in Brazil and the world. The territory of the current municipality has had railways since 1916, and the city's main railway station, Hortolândia Station (formerly Jacuba Station), was inaugurated that year as a telegraphic post and transformed into a stopping point on April 1, 1917. At that time it belonged to the Companhia Paulista de Estradas de Ferro, which administered the railway until 1971, when the company responsible became Ferrovia Paulista S/A (FEPASA). In the early 1990s rail transport began to decline in the region, as in much of the state of São Paulo and Brazil, and the station was deactivated in 1991. It is currently abandoned, but there are projects to restore the building. Today there are still lines crossing the territory of Hortolândia and administered by Brasil Ferrovias, departing from Campinas through Hortolândia and going to Sumaré, from where they continue to other cities in the interior of the state and southern Minas Gerais. However, they have been reduced to a few daily freight train trips, with diesel-powered locomotives at very low speed, transporting cargo to other cities in São Paulo.

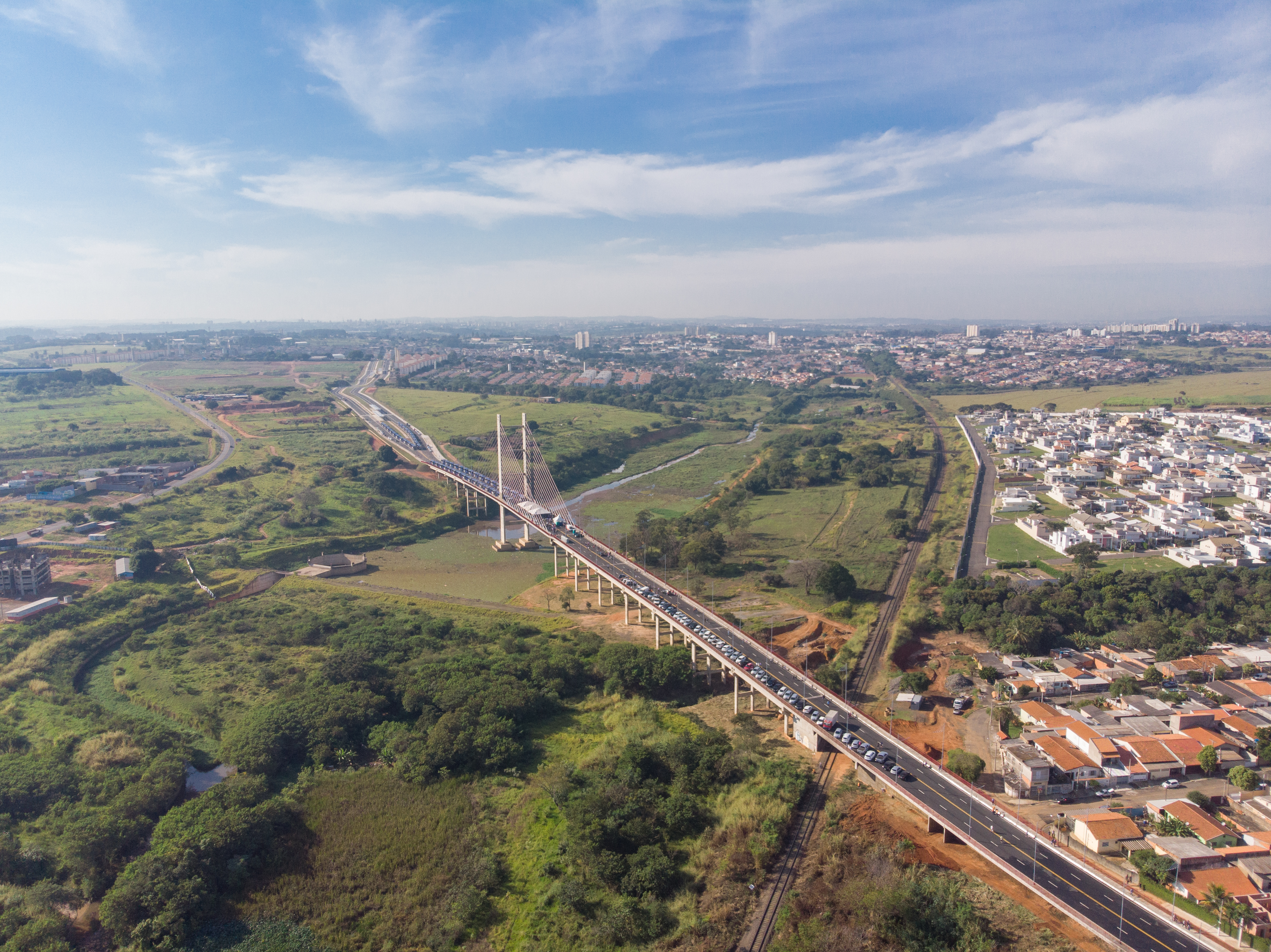
Aerial view of the Cable-Stayed Bridge of Hortolândia

The municipality of Hortolândia has a privileged road-rail network, which through the Via Anhanguera and the Bandeirantes Highway, connects the city to the state capital; through the Dom Pedro I Highway to southern Minas Gerais, municipalities of the Vale do Paraíba and the Rio-São Paulo axis; it also has easy access to Sorocaba, through the interconnections of Anhanguera and Bandeirantes with the Castelo Branco Highway, and to Viracopos International Airport. Within the regional context, SP-330, at the Anhanguera Highway interchange, connects to Paulínia; between Sumaré and Hortolândia, SP-304 (Luiz de Queiroz Highway) links Hortolândia to Sumaré, Nova Odessa, Americana and Piracicaba; SMR-020 links Sumaré and Hortolândia, with a paved lane; SMR-040 links Hortolândia to Monte Mor, with a paved lane. The city has as highways: SP-101 (Jornalista Francisco Aguirre Proença Highway, linking Campinas to Monte Mor) and SP-348 (Bandeirantes Highway).

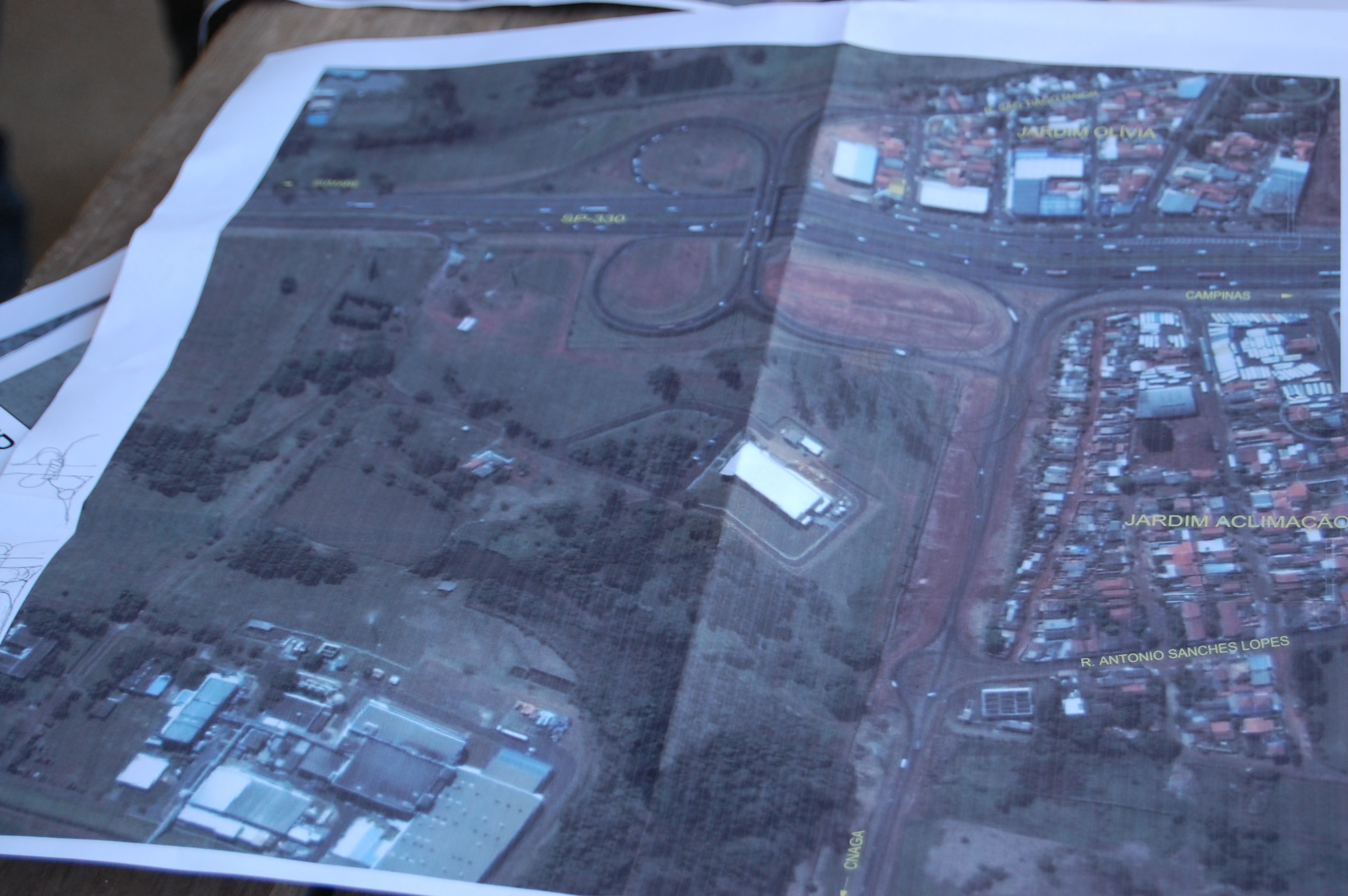
Project for construction of a bridge that will connect the Jardim Nova Europa neighborhood to Sumaré as far as the Anhanguera Highway.

The municipal fleet in 2010 was 61,479 vehicles, of which 42,207 were automobiles, 1,437 trucks, 225 truck tractors, 2,929 pickup trucks, 1,509 utility vehicles, 288 minibuses, 10,987 motorcycles, 997 mopeds, 311 buses, nine wheel tractors, 24 utilities and 556 other types of vehicles. The duplicated and paved avenues and various traffic lights make traffic easier in the city, but the growth in the number of vehicles over the last ten years has been generating increasingly slow car traffic, especially in the municipal seat. In addition, it has become difficult to find parking spaces in the city's commercial center, which has been causing some losses to commerce. In 2007 there were five urban lines: Parque do Horto-Novo Ângulo (route crossing the municipality north-south, passing through the central region); Jardim Amanda-Jardim Carmem Cristina (linking populous neighborhoods, extending to Jardim Conceição on the municipal boundary with Campinas); Jardim São Pedro-Parque Orestes Ongaro (linking these neighborhoods using the Avenida da Emancipação axis); Jardim São Sebastião-Jardim Nova Hortolândia (linking the two neighborhoods through the Central Region); and Jardim Amanda-Jardim Rosolém (linking the aforementioned neighborhoods through the central region). There are interurban lines making the Campinas-Hortolândia route (entering all of Hortolândia's territory, linking neighborhoods with Campinas through intermunicipal lines that cross the municipality) and Hortolândia-Sumaré (entering all of Hortolândia's territory and linking with Sumaré through roads located in the western region of the city).

== Culture ==
The Municipal Department of Culture of Hortolândia is the public body that aims to improve and maintain the city's cultural and artistic sectors through cultural and entertainment attractions. It encourages the organization of musical, theatrical and dance activities in order to stimulate social inclusion and the drafting of cultural policies and actions.

=== Performing arts ===
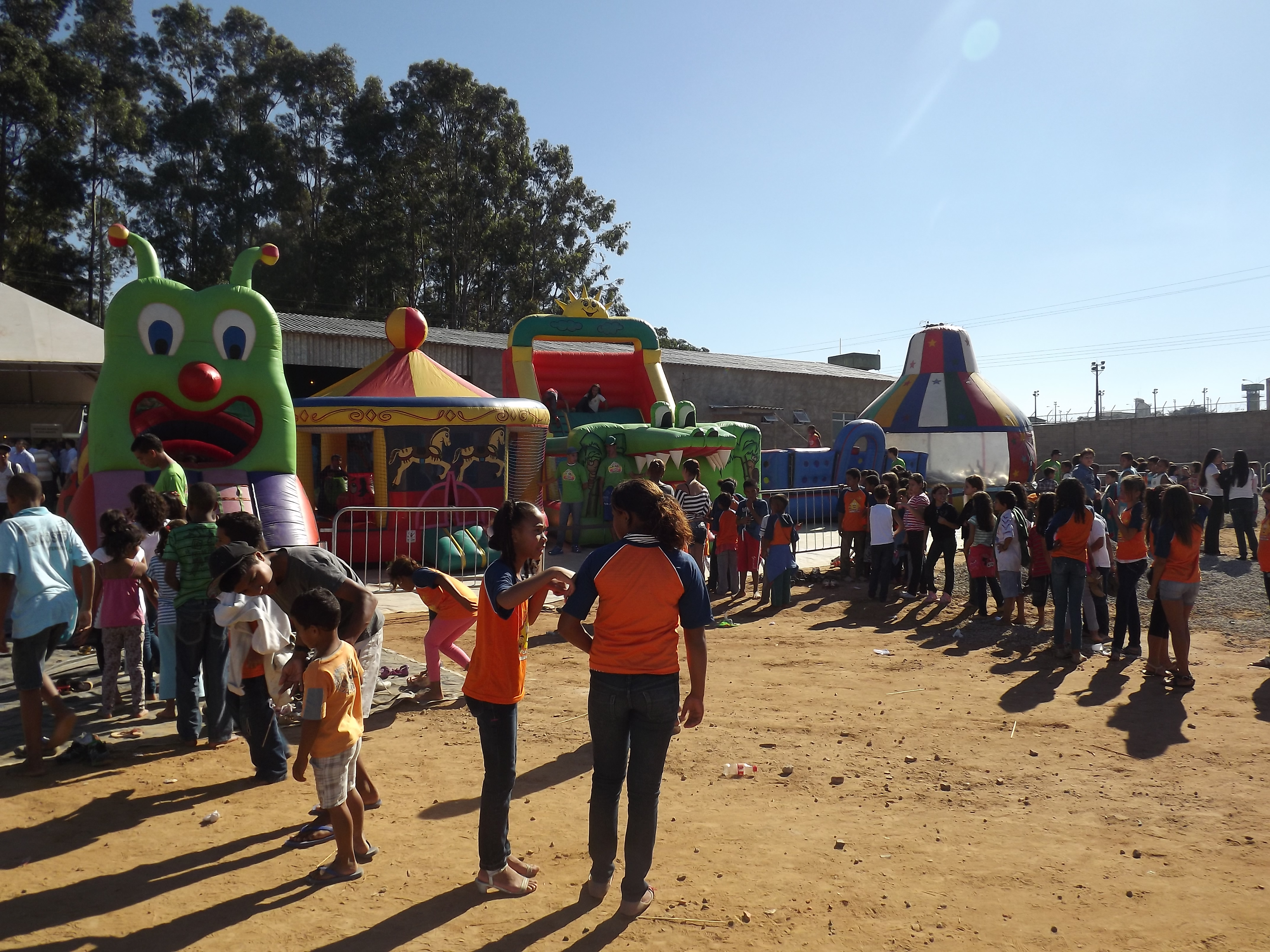
Children from a municipal school during leisure time.

The city has several spaces dedicated to holding cultural events in the theatrical and musical fields. In partnership with the Ministry of Culture (MinC), the city has three culture points, which develop projects in instrumental music, popular guitar, theatre, video and children's musical education. In addition to these projects, it is possible to have contact with elements of hip hop, catira, roda de viola, handicraft, samba de roda, among others. The city has strong representation in Afro-Brazilian culture, with Mães Dango and Eleonora as the main names. Hortolândia is part of the so-called Thematic Chamber of Culture, composed of the municipalities of the Metropolitan Region of Campinas, and one of its main objectives is the organization of projects that publicize artists from the cities of the RMC and indicate them for performances in the region. There are also projects in which children from 1st to 4th grade in municipal schools participate in free courses in the areas of culture, sport, citizenship and education, such as theater, dance, capoeira, visual arts, music, digital inclusion and literature.

Hortolândia has an Infocenter and a Casa Brasil. The city's cultural performances are concentrated in several spaces, such as: the Arlete Afonso Auditorium of Colégio Adventista IASP, six auditoriums of elementary schools and the City Council. The Department of Culture also offers arts classes to the population. The Art and Culture Center (CAC), located in Jardim Nova Hortolândia, serves several students every year in courses such as guitar, samba, theatre, gymnastics, forró, lian gong, street dance, chess, bicycle stunts and kung fu, also forming dance groups composed of students that represent the city in festivals in different regions of the state and even Brazil.

The Municipal library System is being implemented, currently integrated by the Jardim Amanda Branch Library, the Central Library of Hortolândia, the three units of the Comprehensive Child Care Center (CAIC) and the various reading points installed in several parts of the city by the municipal government and the Department of Culture. There is also a "book delivery" project throughout the city, in which users registered in the municipal library system request titles via the Internet or through the voice portal to be created. Many of the libraries and reading points are used not only for reading but also for carrying out research.

=== Music ===
The city hosts several musical events organized throughout the year, where performers range from regional bands to those with national or even international fame. There is, for example, the Moto Fest, held by the Municipal Government of Hortolândia and the Margozeira Motorcycle Club, in the Dorothy Stang Socioenvironmental Park, where since 2000 rock bands from the 1950s and 80s have performed; the Festa do Peão, held since 2004, where over four or five days several singers perform, from regional to national fame, such as Michel Teló, Luan Santana and Gusttavo Lima; and Planeta Rock, featuring rock bands.

Many of these events aim to encourage the continuation of the careers of bands formed in the city. Among the rock bands regionally prominent are Top Of Mind, Anti-fobia, The Noite, BR116, Reggae Rock Jurubeba; Em Danger; UPO HC; Spyler; Garagem 73; Metal Knigths; Dhrama; Slippery; Nosferatu; and Velho Novo. In the city, the rap groups Realidade Cruel and Face da Morte achieved national prominence: the former was formed in 1990 (although it became professional only in 1998) and has released eight albums; the latter, besides creating an independent record label with the same name as the band (which also releases Realidade Cruel's songs), has released five albums since its formation in 1995.

Hortolândia also has a municipal band, which frequently performs at public events organized by the municipal government and by the band itself, in events offered free of charge to the population. Created in 1994 by Municipal Law No. 188, the Municipal Band of Hortolândia is one of the founding pillars of CEMMH (Municipal Music Education Center of Hortolândia). Formed by instruments from the woodwind, brass and percussion families, it offers an eclectic repertoire that covers all musical genres of an erudite and popular nature. At CEMMH, free courses are offered for all young people who wish to learn music and some wind and percussion instrument. It also includes some chamber groups, separated by instruments, such as the saxophone group and flute group, which also perform, like the band, at events held by the municipality's municipal government.

=== Natural and architectural attractions ===
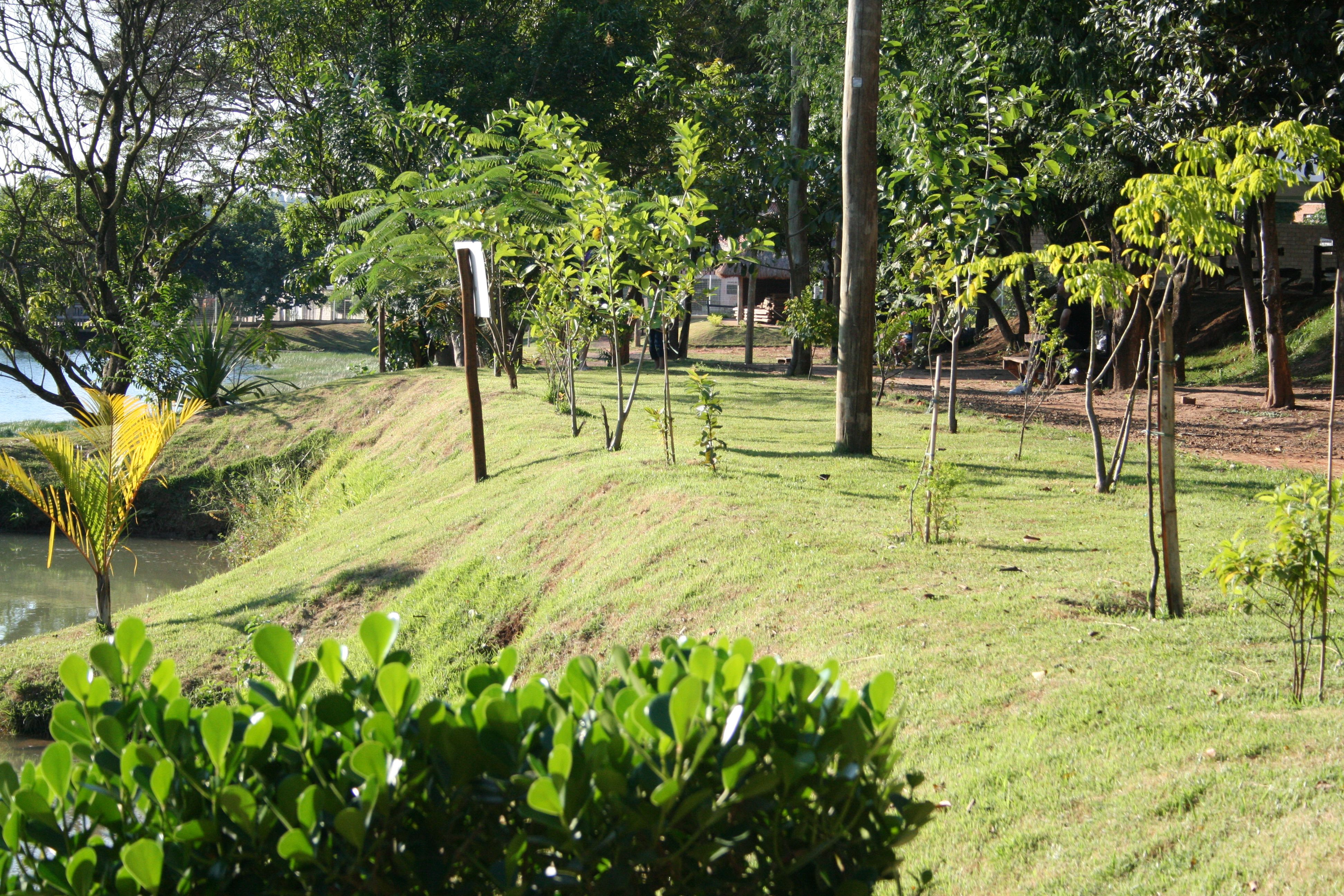
Irmã Dorothy Stang Socioenvironmental Park, located in the Jardim Nossa Senhora de Fátima neighborhood.

Besides scenic attractions, Hortolândia also has a range of historical monuments, natural attractions and places to visit. The Irmã Dorothy Stang Socio-Environmental Park has a walking track, cycle paths, exercise space, kiosk, area for concerts and events, playground and green room for socio-environmental activities and workshops, besides the "Victor Savala" Multi-Sports Gymnasium, the "Yasmin Geovana Santos Bomfim" Artistic Gymnastics Training Center, the Art and Culture Center (CAC) and the Espaço Criança Ecológica. In July 2012 two other attractions were inaugurated: the Turtle Corner, composed of two species of aquatic turtles and one tortoise (a land turtle species), created in order to combat their improper dumping in the municipality's ponds by the population, and the Orchidarium and Fauna Laboratory, which is located in an 80 m² area and houses more than 60 species of orchids.

The Santa Clara Park/CREAPE (Environmental Reference Center School Park) houses the Iberaba Natural History Museum, which has more than 200 species of stuffed animals, and has a place for producing objects and furniture made from recyclable materials, offering recycling workshops with activities for children.

The Chico Mendes Linear Park also has a walking track, cycleway, playground, exercise equipment, tables and benches. It was inaugurated in May 2010, in celebration of the city's anniversary, and has an area 840 meters long, located where an old ceramics factory once stood, on the banks of the Santa Clara Stream. Revitalization interventions were carried out and the green area of the place was restored.

In Jardim Rosolem, the A Poderosa square stands out, created in 1995; it caused controversy due to its cost, which at the time was R$ 1 million. It is undergoing renovation and an open-air amphitheater is under construction, intended for large theater, music and dance performances, besides a leisure area with 1,400 circular meters.

=== Events ===
The Department of Culture and the state government also promote various festivals and competitions. The Theater Festival, for example, gives participants and spectators the possibility of learning about writing, reading and theater as an art form, helping to develop bodily, oral and written expression. Literary works as well as their authors are recalled there. The Student Theater Festival, held since 2007, involves the city's schools, focusing on artistic production in the student environment. The Dance Festival aims to teach participants and even the public bodily movements, rhythms and body awareness through dance, also valuing cultural traditions and customs of the municipality and region. The Music Festival is organized by the schools to which the project is linked, improving the knowledge and skills of the students involved.

Besides artistic celebrations, events that also stand out in the city include: the June festivals, organized both in public and private schools and in squares or public places, with the consumption of typical foods and drinks and traditional quadrilha dances; the Integration Gymkhana, held in schools at the beginning of the school year in order to help new students get to know the school facilities and become familiar with the new place of study, besides collecting cleaning materials, personal hygiene items and food, which will be donated to a social assistance institution in Hortolândia; and the Carnival of Hortolândia, with performances by samba school groups and shows; besides the Festa do Peão, Moto Fest and Planeta Rock, mentioned earlier.

=== Sport ===
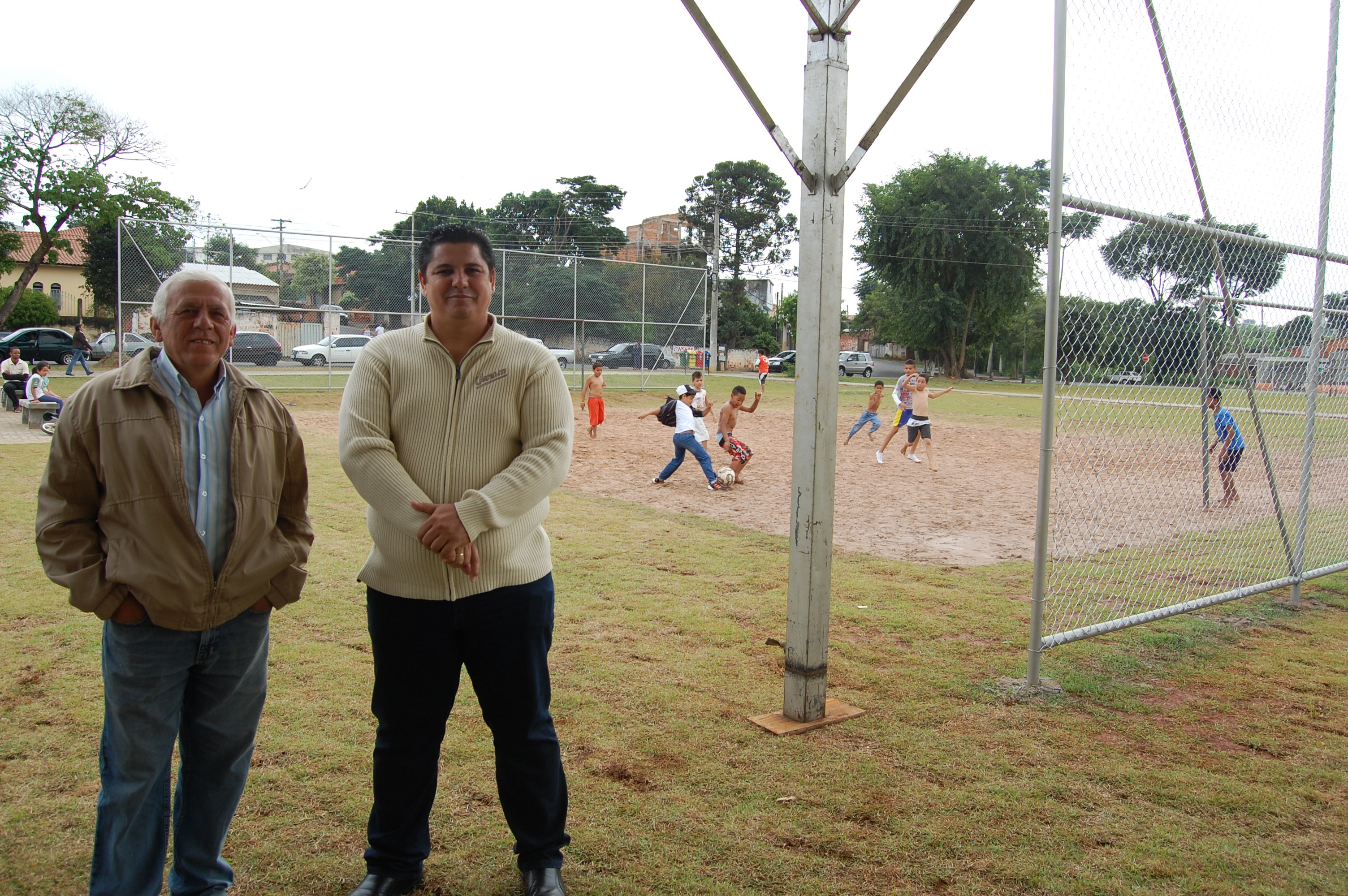
Football field at Maria Madalena de Oliveira Square (Praça do Malta), Jardim Malta neighborhood.

In 2006 the city gained a professional football team, Social Esportiva Vitória (SEV), which has already competed in some editions of the lower divisions of the Campeonato Paulista. Hortolândia has always been marked by amateur football that enlivens the city's fields on weekends. On March 19 of that same year, the municipal government inaugurated the first professional-size stadium with conditions approved by the Paulista Football Federation (FPF), the Estádio Municipal José Francisco Breda, or simply Tico Breda, as it is known. In 2008, for the first time, the city was one of those chosen to host matches of the Copa São Paulo de Futebol Júnior. In 2009, for the second time, it was one of the hosts of the youth cup, during the first phase, second phase, round of 16 and quarterfinals of the 2009 edition.

The Municipal Sports Department also frequently organizes several sporting events or helps in holding regional championships, such as the Horto Cup of futsal, the Municipal Futsal Cup, the Amateur Football Championship, the Regional Judo Championship, and the Volleyball and Basketball Tournament. In Hortolândia there are also teams of athletics, basketball, capoeira, artistic gymnastics, handball, swimming and beach volleyball.

=== Holidays ===
In Hortolândia there are two municipal holidays, eight national holidays and six optional observances. The municipal holidays are the city's anniversary, celebrated on May 19; and Black Awareness Day, on November 20. According to federal law no. 9.093, approved on September 12, 1995, municipalities may have at most four municipal holidays of a religious nature, including Good Friday.

== See also ==
- List of municipalities in São Paulo
- Interior of São Paulo
