= Independente Futebol Clube =

Independente de Limeira
- Full name: Independente Futebol Clube
- Nickname: Galo da Vila Esteves
- Founded: January 19, 1944
- Ground: Comendador Agostinho Prada
- Capacity: 13,000
- President: Fatima Emilia Mattos dos Anjos
- League: Campeonato Paulista Segunda Divisão
- 2025: Paulista Segunda Divisão, 4th of 15
Home colours	Away colours	Third colours

Independente Futebol Clube, more commonly referred to as Independente de Limeira, is a Brazilian football club based in Limeira, São Paulo. The team compete in Campeonato Paulista Segunda Divisão, the fourth tier of the São Paulo state football league.

== History ==
Independente Futebol Clube was founded on January 19, 1944.

The supporters of Independente lived a historic day on Wednesday night. In the fifth round of the decisive quadrangular of the A3 Series, the modest team beat traditional rivals Inter de Limeira, champions of São Paulo in 86, 3–1 at Estádio Pradão and secured access to the A2 Series.

== Honours ==
- Campeonato Paulista Série A3
  - Winners (1): 1973
- Campeonato Paulista Série A4
  - Winners (2): 1999, 2011
- Campeonato Paulista Segunda Divisão
  - Winners (1): 2026
- Copa Energil C
  - Winners (1): 2007

== Rival ==
Internacional de Limeira is the club's rival.
