= Rodovia Jornalista Francisco Aguirre Proença =

Highway in São Paulo, Brazil

SP-101 Rodovia Jornalista Francisco Aguirre Proença
- Rodovia Campinas-Monte Mor
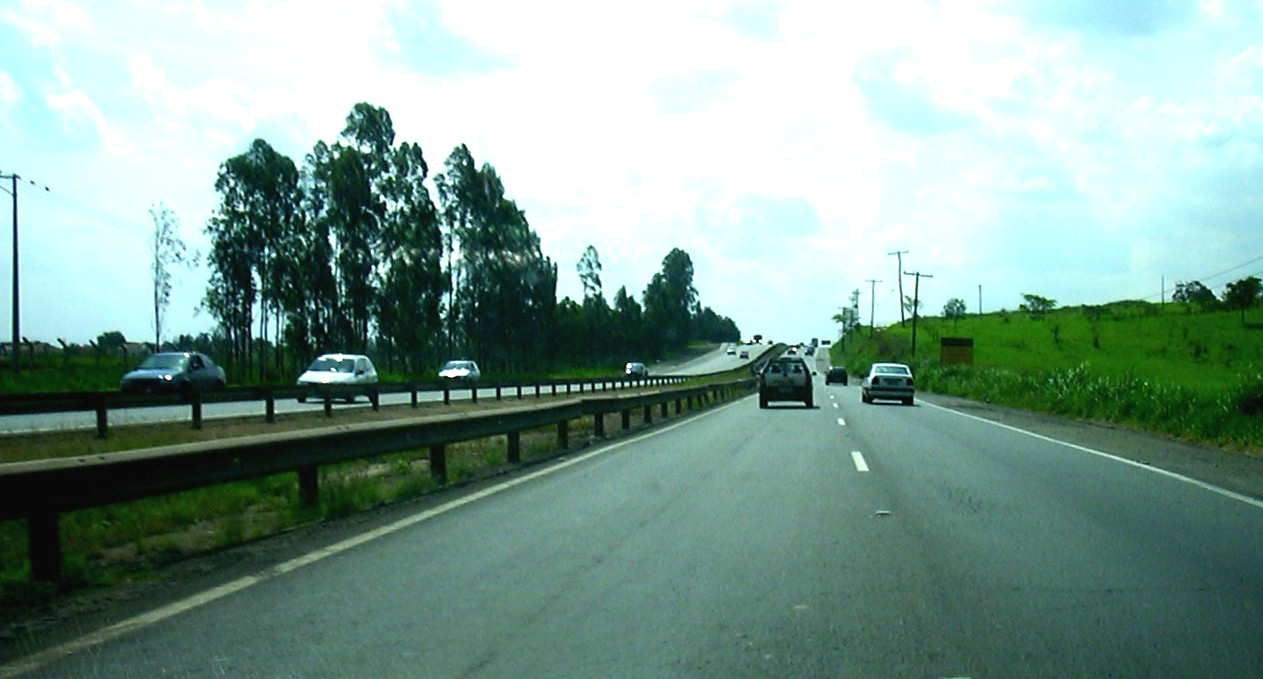

Route information
- Maintained by Rodovias do Tietê
- Length: 51 km (32 mi)

Major junctions
- East end: Av. Robert Bosch in Campinas, SP
- Rodovia Anhanguera; Rodovia dos Bandeirantes; SP-308
- West end: Av. Tarsila do Amaral in Capivari, SP

Location
- Country: Brazil
- State: São Paulo

Highway system
- Highways in Brazil; Federal; São Paulo State Highways

Rodovia Jornalista Francisco Aguirre Proença (SP-101) is a state highway in the State of São Paulo which connects the cities of Campinas, Hortolândia, Monte Mor, Elias Fausto and Capivari. Its first 25 kilometers are double-laned, the rest is still single-laned. The road has a high traffic because along its way there are several large companies in the services and industry sectors, such as EMS Sigma Farma, Dow Chemical, Bosch, IBM and others. It is also known as Rodovia Campinas-Monte Mor.

== See also ==
- Highway system of São Paulo
- Brazilian Highway System
