= Electoral college (disambiguation) =

An electoral college is a set of electors who choose among candidates for a particular office.

Electoral College or electoral college may also refer to:

- Electoral College (United States), presidential electors
- Electoral College (India), presidential electors
- Electoral College (Pakistan), presidential electors
- Electoral College (Holy Roman Empire), prince-electors of the Holy Roman Empire
- Presidential Electoral College of Burma
- Electoral colleges for the Senate, electoral colleges of the Caribbean Netherlands and Dutch expatriates
- European Parliament constituencies in Belgium:
  - Dutch-speaking electoral college
  - French-speaking electoral college
  - German-speaking electoral college

== See also ==
- College of Cardinals, body of all cardinals of the Roman Catholic Church, papal electors
- Election Committee (disambiguation)
- Federal Convention (Germany), body that elects the President of Germany
