= Social Esportiva Vitória =

SEV Hortolândia
- Nickname(s): SEV; Lobo
- Founded: 5 October 2001; 23 years ago
- Stadium: Tico Breda
- Capacity: 10,002
- President: Victor Astini Muniz
- League: Paulista Série B
- Website: http://www.sevhortolandia.com.br/
Home colours	Away colours

Social Esportiva Vitória (also known as SEV Hortolândia or SEV) was a Brazilian football located in the city of Hortolândia, São Paulo. The club was founded on 10 May 2001 as "Sociedade Esportiva Votuporanga" in the city of Votuporanga, where the club remained until 2005. The club commenced activities at their new location in January 2006. SEV Hortolândia play their matches at the Estádio Municipal José Francisco Breda, which has a capacity of 10,002 spectators.

== History ==
=== Founding ===
On 10 May 2001, Sociedade Esportiva Votuporanga was founded by in the city of Votuporanga. In 2002 the club competed in the now-defunct Campeonato Paulista Serie B3 (the sixth division of São Paulo football). Two consecutive promotions in 2003 and 2004 qualified Sociedade Esportiva Votuporanga for the 2005 Serie A3.

=== Relocation ===
After a bad 2005 campaign, the club relocated to Hortolândia in search of better municipal support and business sponsorship, and the club was renamed to Social Esportiva Vitória. Closer location to the state capital increased the club's chance of success.

As early as 2006, the team competed under the new name of SEV Hortolândia. The team began activities in the new headquarters on 29 January 2006, competing in the Paulista Championship Series A3. Their first match in Hortolândia was on 19 March in the Estadio José Francisco Breda Municipal. The match ended in a 2-0 defeat to Ferroviária.

In 2007 the under-20 team of SEV Hortolandia participated in and won the Trinidad and Tobago international tournament. In 2008, the SEV youth team participated for the first time in a national competition, the São Paulo Junior Football Cup.

=== Withdrawal from professional competition ===
In 2011, lacking resources and support from the city, SEV did not apply for the professional license to compete in the São Paulo state league.

After two years of absence, the team returns in 2013 to the participate in the fourth division of the São Paulo championship. In 2015, the club announced permanent retirement from the championship, competing in youth competitions only.

== Competition history ==
São Paulo State Championship

Year	Competition	Result	Pos.
2002	Série B3	First phase	6th
2003	Série B3	Promoted	4th
2004	Série B2	Promoted	4th
2005	Série A3	First phase	16th
2006	Série A3	First phase	14th
2006	Copa FPF	First phase	5th
2007	Série A3	First phase	14th
2007	Copa Energil C	Semifinal	4th
2008	Série A3	Relegated	18th
2009	Segunda Divisão	First phase	41st
2010	Segunda Divisão	First phase	39th
2013	Segunda Divisão	Second phase	24th
2014	Segunda Divisão	First phase	32nd

Copa São Paulo de Futebol Júnior

Ano	Competição	Desempenho	Pos.
2008	Copa São Paulo Júnior	First phase	73rd
2009	Copa São Paulo Júnior	First phase	56th
