= Rodovia Santos Dumont =

SP-075 Rodovia Santos Dumont

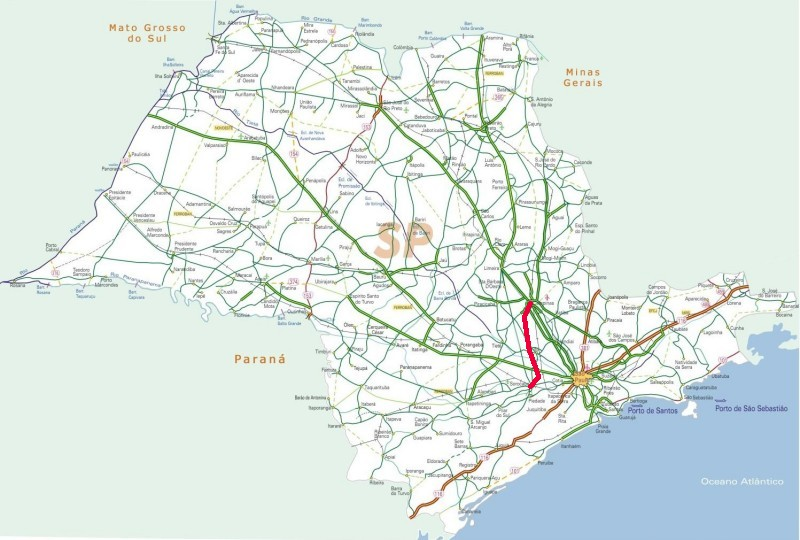
- Map of the itinerary of Rodovia Santos Dumont (in red)

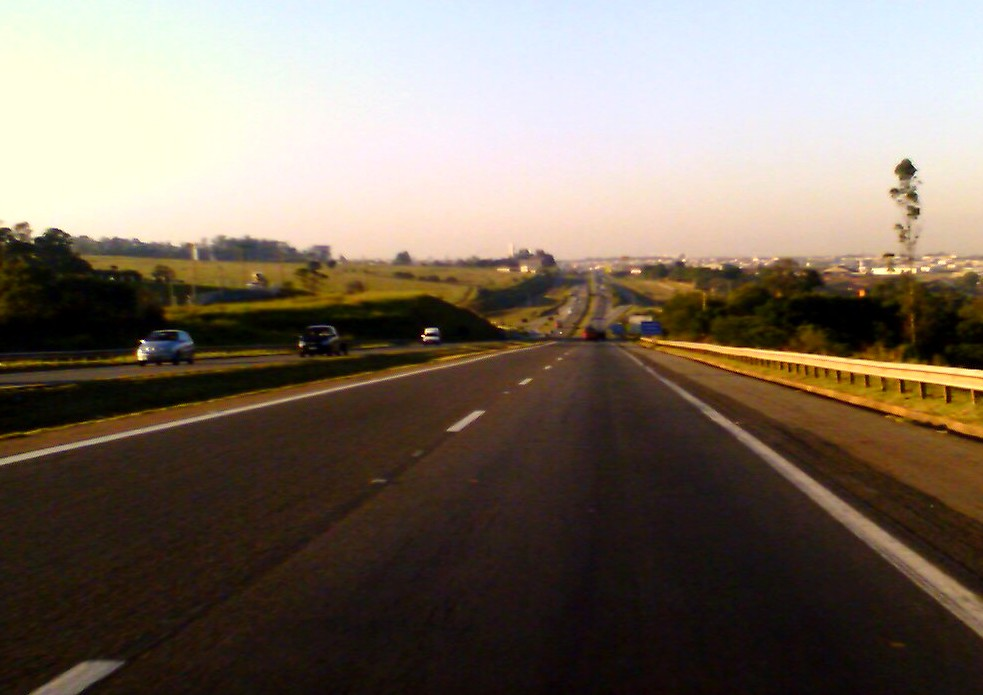
- View of Santos Dumont Highway, near the city of Salto.

Route information
- Maintained by Rodovias das Colinas
- Length: 14.9 km (9.3 mi)
- Existed: 1985–present

Major junctions
- North end: Av. Prestes Maia in Campinas, SP
- Rodovia Anhanguera; Rodovia dos Bandeirantes; SP-324
- South end: Rod. Eng. Ermênio de Oliveira Penteado in Indaiatuba, SP

Location
- Country: Brazil
- State: São Paulo

Highway system
- Highways in Brazil; Federal; São Paulo State Highways

Rodovia Santos Dumont (officially designated SP-075) is a highway in the state of São Paulo, Brazil.

It runs in a north–south direction and interconnects the cities of Campinas, Indaiatuba, Salto, Itu and Sorocaba, crossing with two other major highways, Rodovia Castelo Branco, near Sorocaba, and the Rodovia dos Bandeirantes near Campinas. The Viracopos Airport is located at the km 66 of the highway.

The highway honours the Brazilian inventor Alberto Santos-Dumont, considered the "father of aviation". Santos Dumont was born in the town of Palmira (today called Santos Dumont) in the state of Minas Gerais but at one point in his life he also studied in Campinas. Rodovia Santos Dumont is a road system managed and maintained through a state concession to a private company, and therefore it is a toll road.

== See also ==
- Highway system of São Paulo
- Brazilian Highway System
