= SP-324 (São Paulo highway) =

State highway in São Paulo, Brazil

SP-324

Route information
- Length: 14.400 km (8.948 mi)

Location
- Country: Brazil
- State: São Paulo

Highway system
- Highways in Brazil; Federal; São Paulo State Highways

The Miguel Melhado Campos highway (SP-324), also known as the Vinhedo-Viracopos, is a single-lane state highway in the state of São Paulo, Brazil.
