= Anhanguera (disambiguation) =

Anhanguera is a genus of pterosaurs

Anhanguera may also refer to:

== People ==
- Bartolomeu Bueno da Silva (1672–1740), a bandeirante also known as Anhanguera
- Anhangüera I, father of Bartolomeu Bueno da Silva

== Places in Brazil ==
- Anhanguera, Goiás, a municipality in the state of Goiás
- Anhanguera (district of São Paulo), a district in São Paulo
- Parque Anhanguera, a municipal park in São Paulo
- Rede Anhanguera de Comunicação (RAC), a mass communication company from Campinas
- Rodovia Anhanguera, a highway in the state of São Paulo

== Other meanings ==
- Anhanguera (devil), in Brazilian mythology
- Anhanguera Educacional, an educational company
- CDT da Anhanguera, a television production facility
