= BR-050 (Brazil highway) =

Highway in Brazil

BR-050

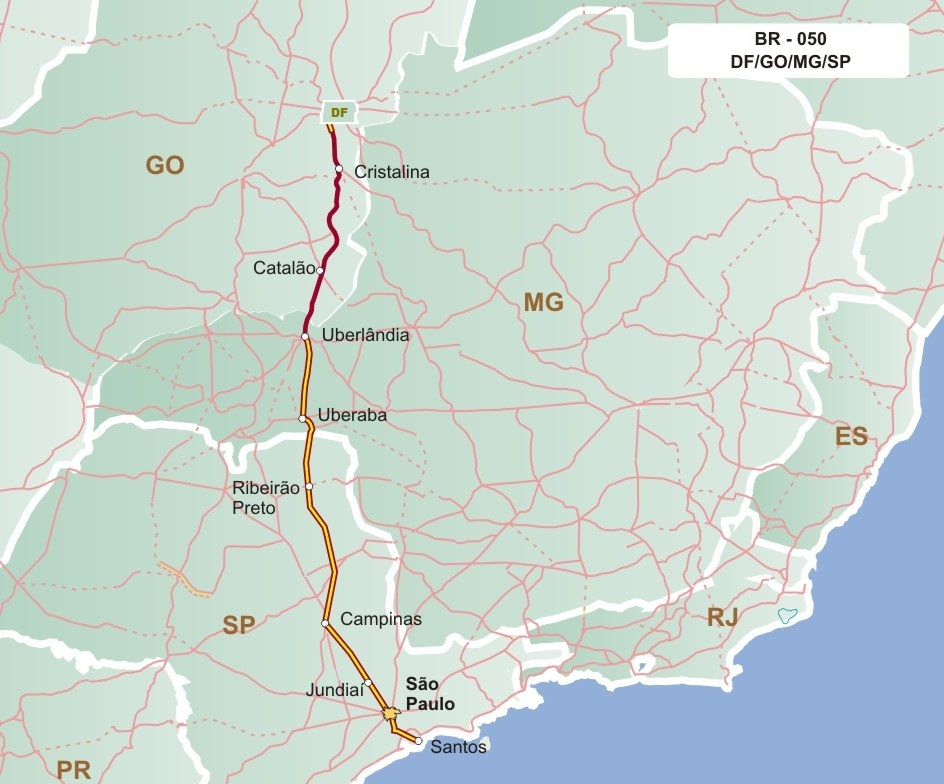

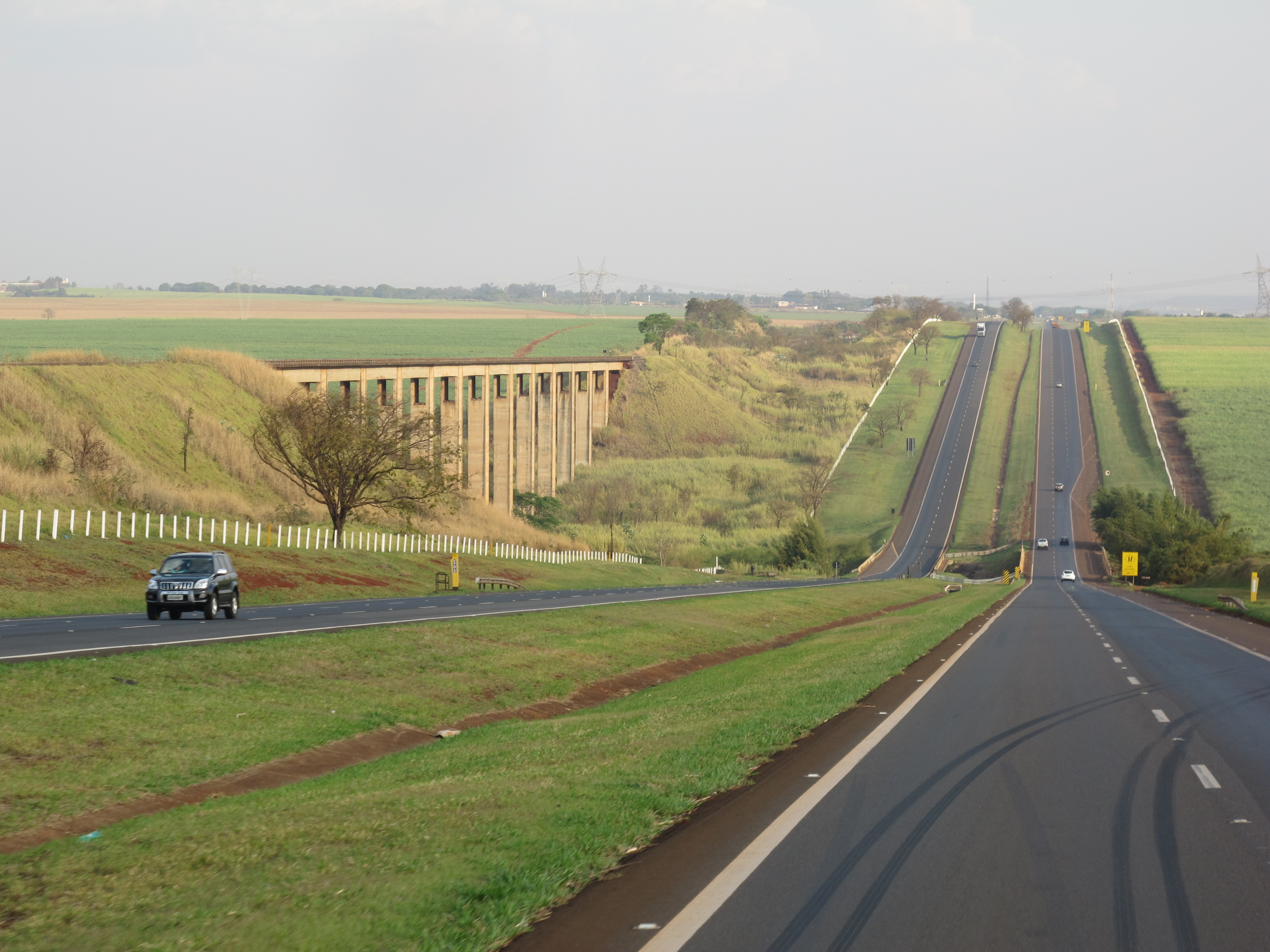

Route information
- Length: 1,025.3 km (637.1 mi)

Major junctions
- North end: Brasília, Distrito Federal
- South end: Santos, São Paulo

Location
- Country: Brazil

Highway system
- Highways in Brazil; Federal

BR-050 is a federal highway of Brazil. The 1025.3 kilometre road connects Brasília to Santos. Inside of São Paulo, the highway also receives the designation of Rodovia Anhanguera (SP-330).

== Economic importance ==
The BR-050 is undoubtedly one of the most important highways in the country. Close to being fully converted into a dual carriageway in 2021, it passes through some of the richest regions of Brazil. It links areas of large agricultural and industrial production to Port of Santos, the largest in the country. Brasília is the city with the highest average salary per inhabitant. Goiás is one of the largest national producers of sugarcane, soy, corn and tomatoes, in addition to having a large cattle ranching. The area between Uberaba and Uberlândia, in Minas Gerais, has the largest milk production in Brazil. The state of São Paulo holds 30% of Brazil's industrial GDP and a gigantic agricultural sector. In Ribeirão Preto there is the largest production of sugarcane in the world. In Franca, there is the largest national production of men's shoes. The highway also drains the gigantic production of coffee from Minas Gerais and orange juice from São Paulo. In the area around Campinas there is a great technological production. 40% of the cars produced in the country come from the cities of Greater São Paulo. Not to mention the production of chicken meat and all industrial production in São Paulo, which is basically exported via Santos.

== Duplication ==
The highway doubles from Santos, passing, among others, through the cities of São Paulo, Campinas, Ribeirão Preto, Uberaba, Uberlândia and Araguari, to the bridge over the Paranaíba river, on the border with the state of Goiás.

In the state of Goiás, the section between Catalão and Cristalina, which has 183 km, is in the process of being dualled, with 176 km completed.

== Gallery ==
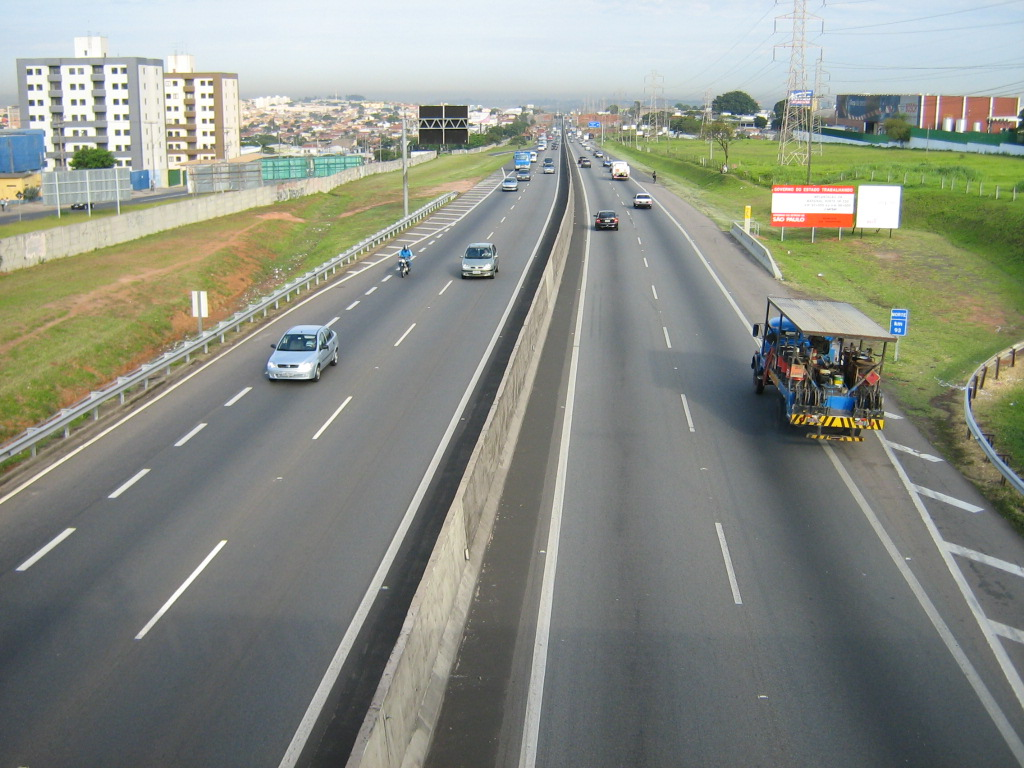
BR-050 in the state of São Paulo

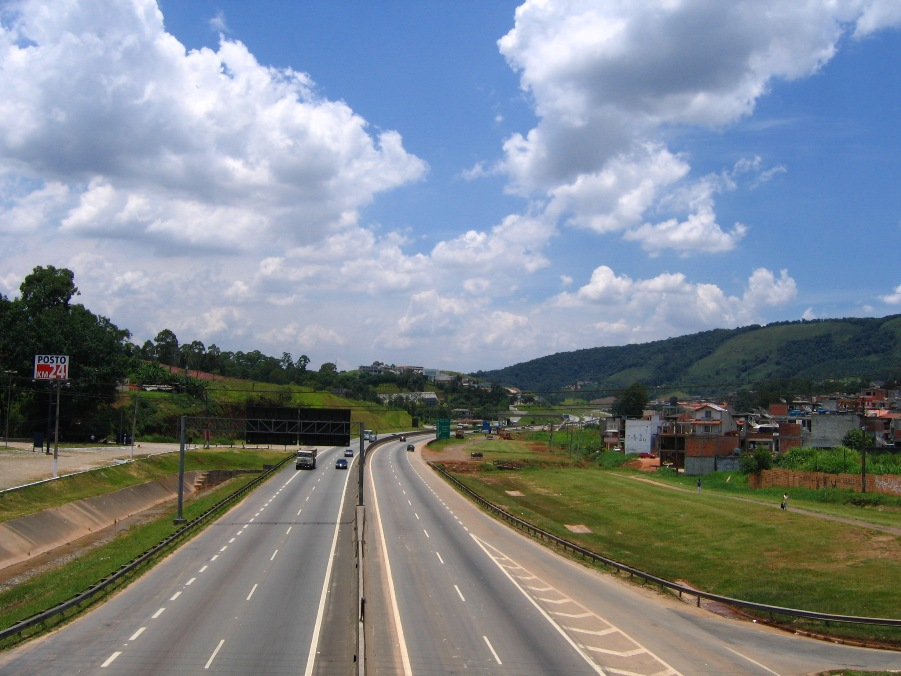
Rodovia Anhanguera (BR-050) in the region of Perus

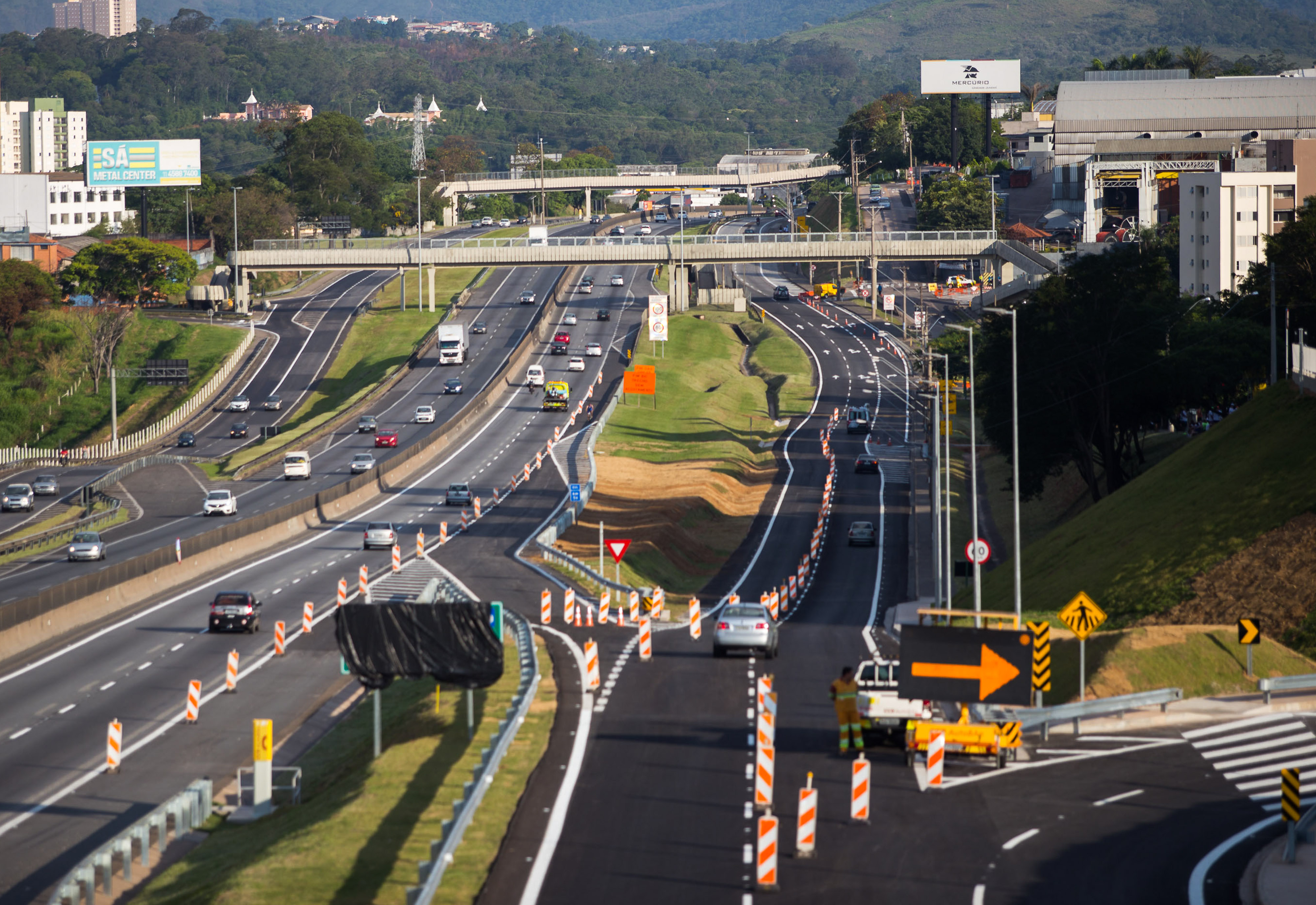
Rodovia Anhanguera (BR-050) in Jundiaí

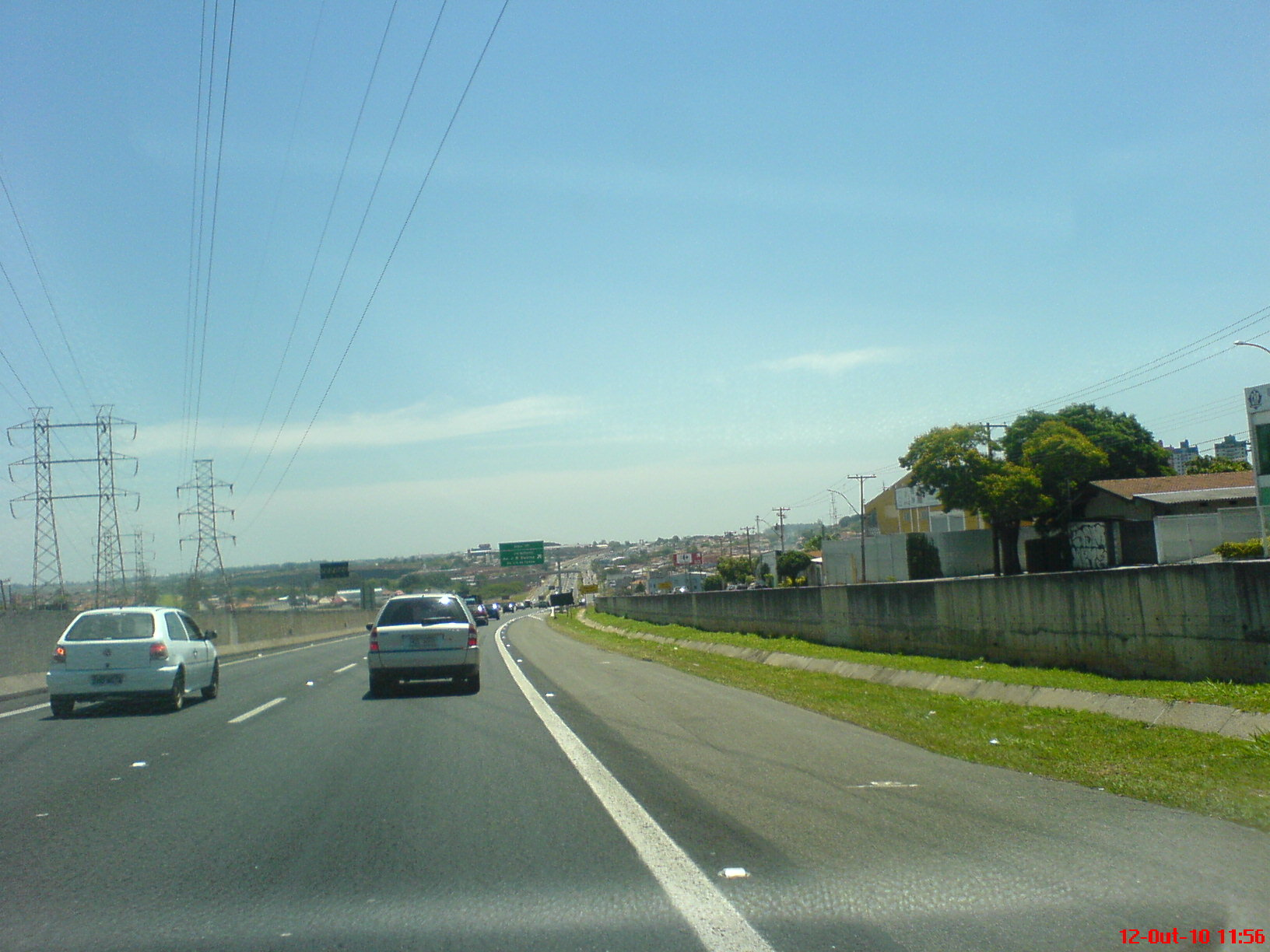
Rodovia Anhanguera (BR-050) in the region of Campinas

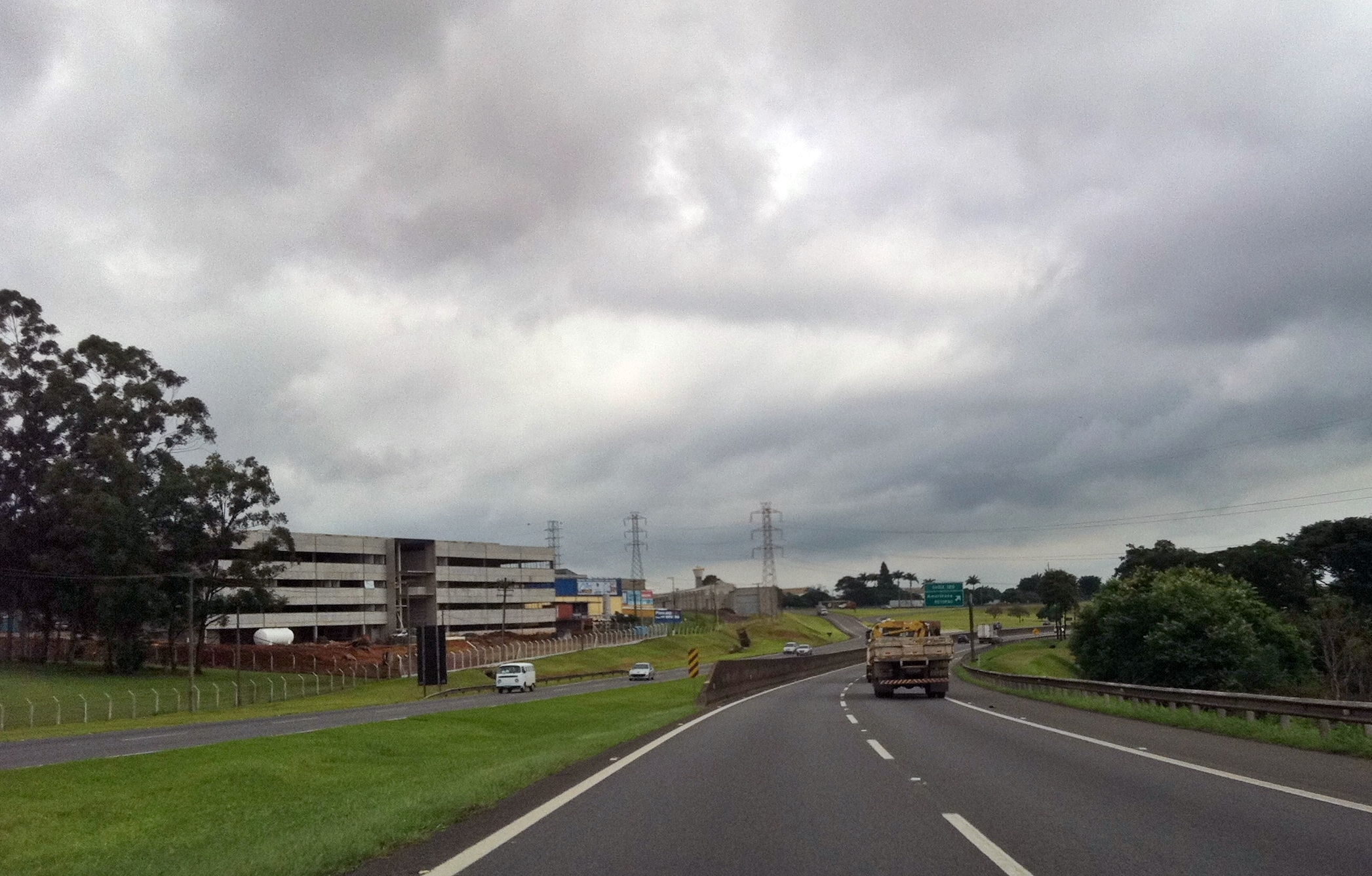
Rodovia Anhanguera (BR-050) in Americana

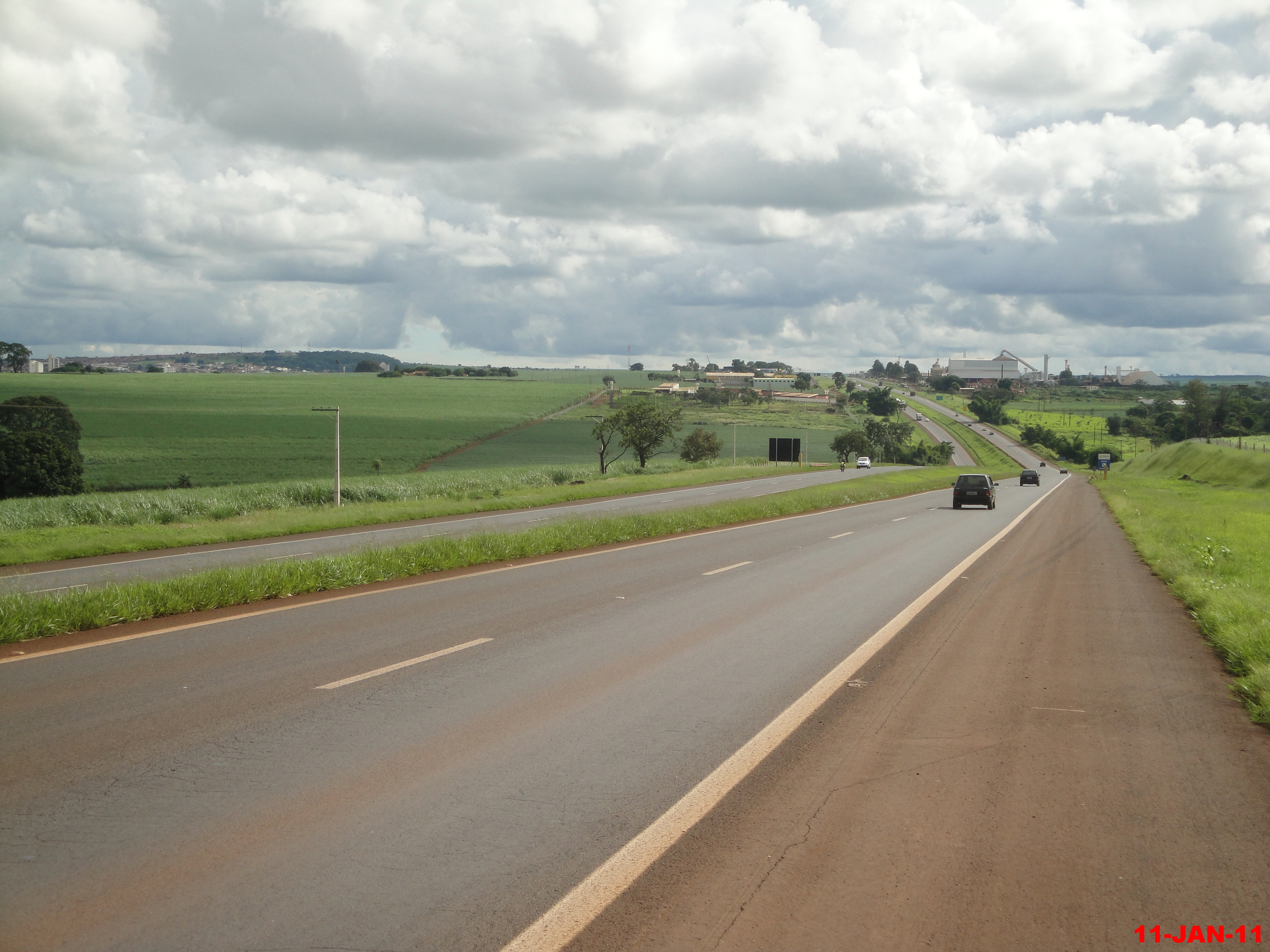
Rodovia Anhanguera (BR-050) near São Joaquim da Barra

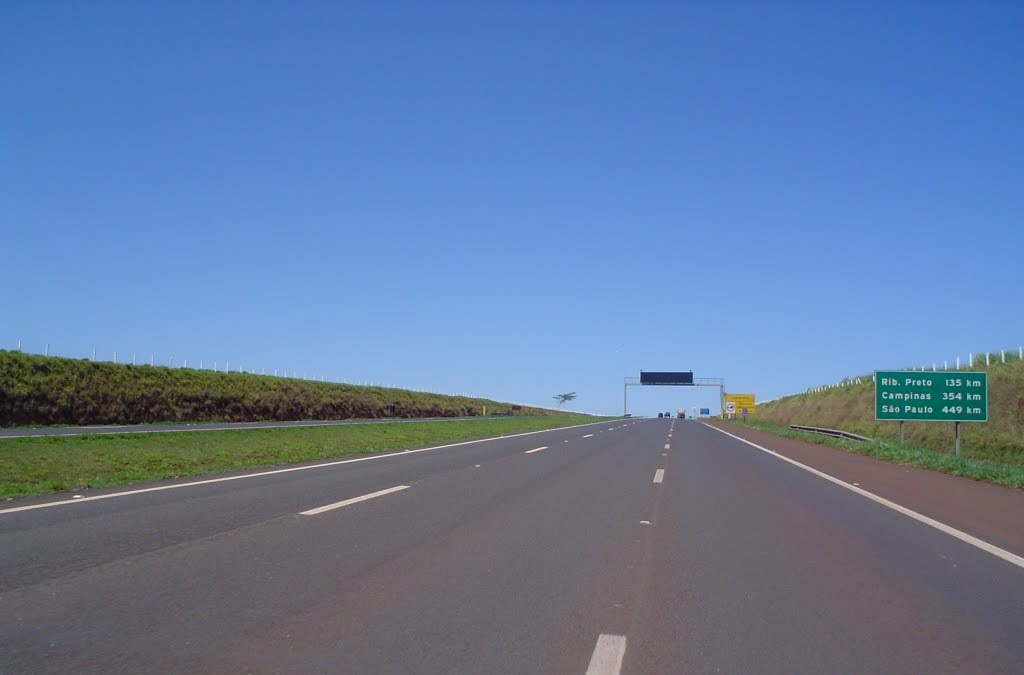
Rodovia Anhanguera (BR-050) in Igarapava

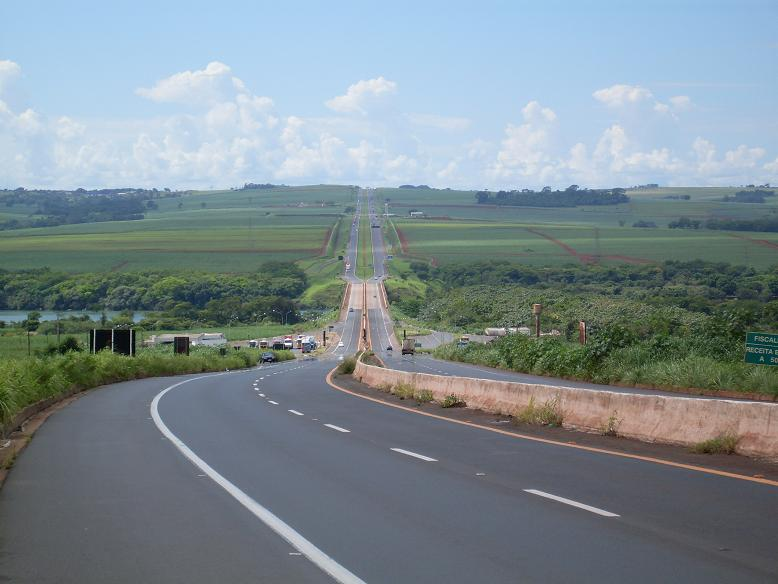
BR 050, border between São Paulo and Minas Gerais

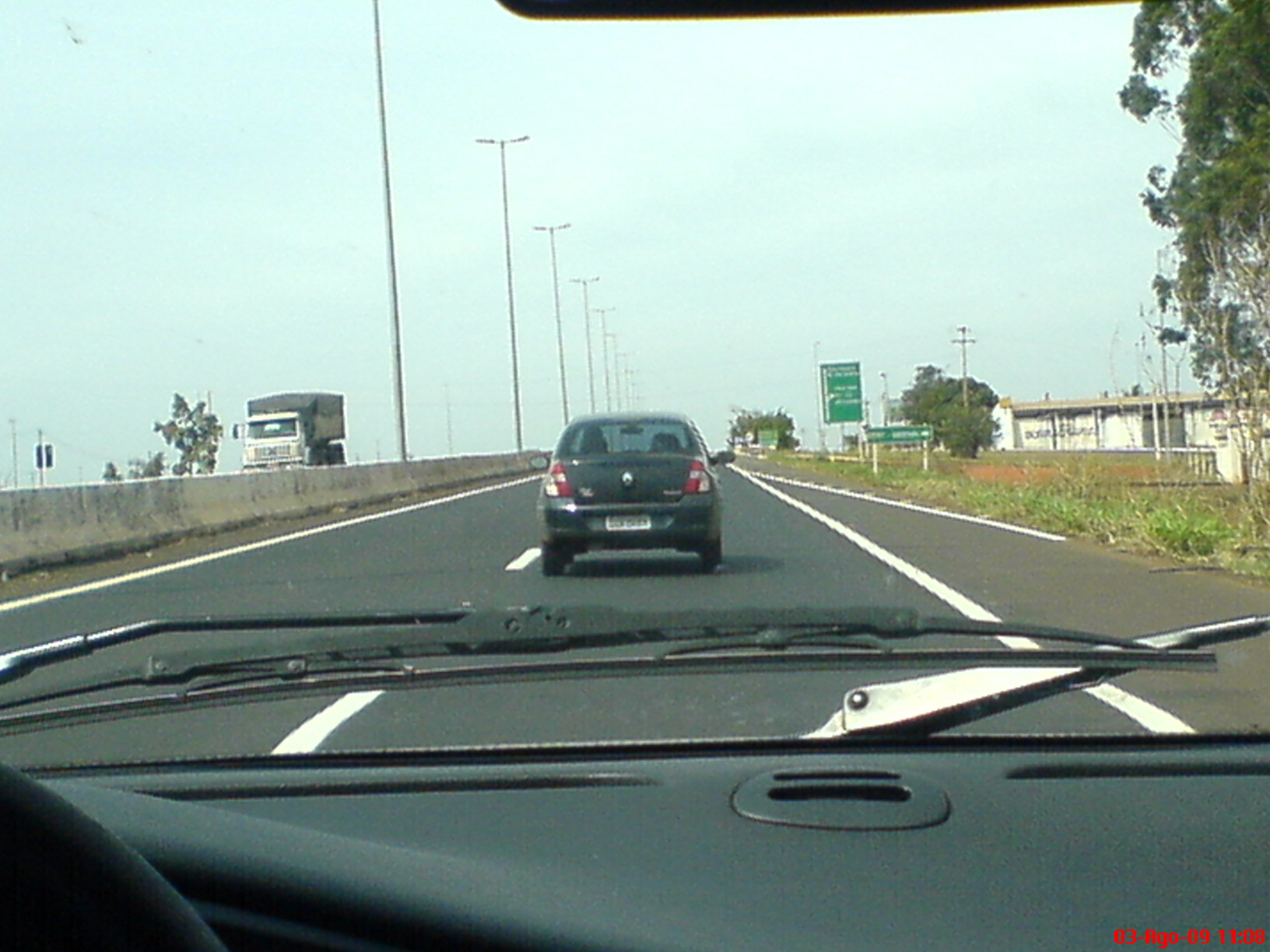
BR-050 near Uberaba, Minas Gerais

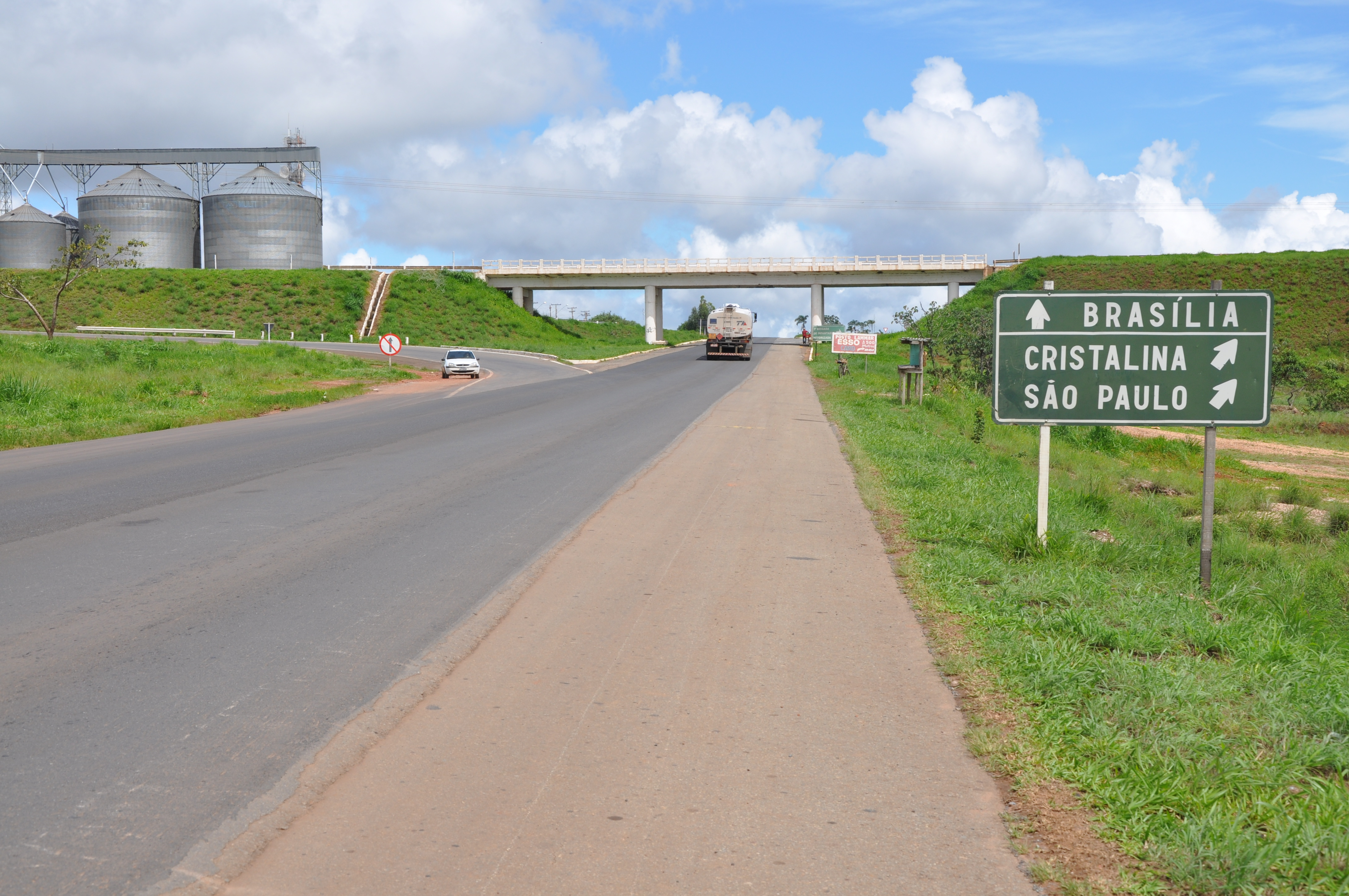
Section of BR-040 at the junction with BR-050 (the viaduct) in Cristalina, Goiás.

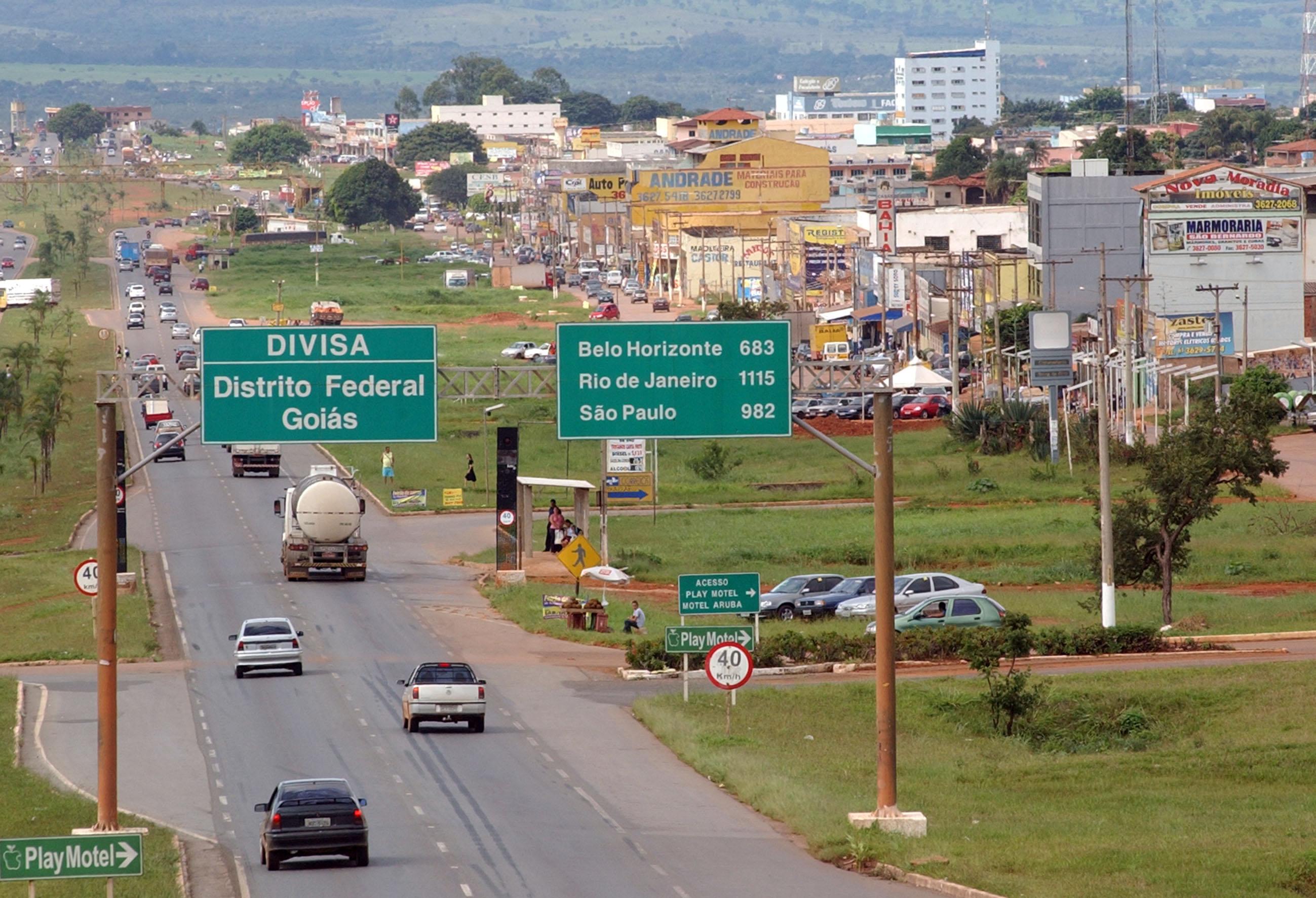
Concomitant stretch with BR-040, close to Valparaíso de Goiás, on the border between the Federal District and Goiás.
