= Perus =

Perus may refer to:

- Perus (district of São Paulo)
- Subprefecture of Perus, São Paulo
- Perus (butterfly), a genus of butterflies in the subfamily Carcharodini
- Finns Party, commonly abbreviated as "Perus"
