= Rodovia Anhanguera =

Highway in São Paulo, Brazil

SP-330
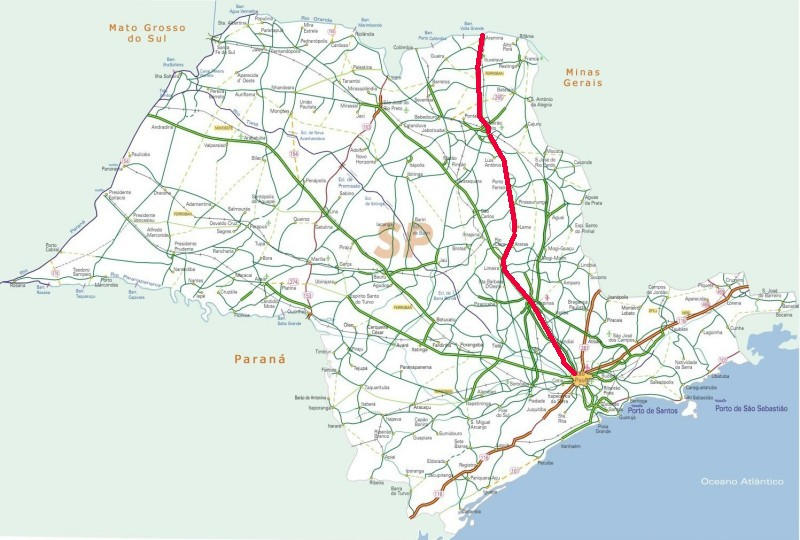
- Native name: Rodovia Anhanguera (Portuguese)
- Namesake: Bartolomeu Bueno da Silva
- Type: Double-lane highway
- Length: 453 km (281 mi)
- Location: Passes through São Paulo, Cajamar, Jundiai, Louveira, Vinhedo, Valinhos, Campinas, Sumaré, Nova Odessa, Americana, Limeira, Araras, Leme, Pirassununga, Porto Ferreira, Cravinhos, Ribeirão Preto, Orlândia, São Joaquim da Barra, Guará, Ituverava, Igarapava
- South end: Rua Monte Pascal Lapa, in the city of São Paulo
- Major junctions: SP 348 (Rodovia dos Bandeirantes), km 48, km 102 and km 158; SP 300 (Dom Gabriel Couto); SP 075 (Rodovia Santos Dumont); SP 065 (Rodovia Dom Pedro I), km 103; SP 304, km 120; SP 310 (Rodovia Washington Luís), km 153
- North end: Igarapava – Next to Minas Gerais State Border

Construction
- Inauguration: 1940/1948/1950 and 1953/1959/1961

The Rodovia Anhanguera (official designation SP-330) (In English: Anhanguera Highway) is a highway in the state of São Paulo, Brazil. It is one of the country's busiest transportation corridors. A 2005 survey conducted amongst Brazilian truck drivers rated it as the best transportation axis in the country. It is part of the federal highway called BR-050 that connects Brasilia to São Paulo, however, in the state of São Paulo it receives the name of SP-330.

The Anhanguera Highway connects the city of São Paulo with the northeastern part of the state of São Paulo going through industrial cities and one of the most productive agricultural areas. It is one of the most important highways in Brazil and one of the busiest, with the highest traffic segment between São Paulo and Campinas, the first to be built. It is duplicated, containing sections with additional tracks and marginal clues. They have heavy traffic, especially of trucks. It is considered, together with the Bandeirantes Highway and the Washington Luis Highway, the country's largest financial corridor, since it interconnects some of the state's metropolitan regions such as São Paulo, Campinas and Ribeirão Preto, as well as the Jundiaí Urban Agglomerate and the Central Administrative Region.

== History ==
A route was firstly mentioned in 1774 in a letter written by a lieutenant called José Peixoto da Silva Braga, with the track of the route. In that time, the lieutenant joined to the group of Bartolomeu Bueno da Silva (nicknamed as Anhanguera), a famous bandeirante who explored the backlands of Brazil to look for precious stones. A dirt road between São Paulo city and Campinas was opened, and afterwards reaching the state of Goiás, receiving the name of "Caminho dos Goyazes" (in English: Goyazes road). This road served the cattle troops and voyagers who explored the backlands for gold, precious stones and slaves, and after transported goods to small villages that were built along the road.

The construction of a new road was started in 1914, based on the old Anhanguera's road. A group of 84 forced labor prisoners, paved 32 km of the track between São Paulo and Campinas. After some years, the prisoners were changed by employees to continue the construction and extend the road to northern regions of the state of São Paulo. A new highway was then officially inaugurated in the 1940s, with different track, between São Paulo and Campinas. It was the first modern, asphalt-paved, four-lane highway in the country, named then as Anhanguera Highway.

Anhanguera was the name given by native indigenous people to the bandeirante explorer of the 16th century, Bartolomeu Bueno da Silva, who impressed them with tricks of setting fire to a plate full of cachaça, a Brazilian alcoholic drink. Anhanguera in the indigenous Tupi language means "old devil". The name of the new and modern highway was given to honor this bandeirante explorer, responsible by creating the old route and extending the territorial limits of Brazil.

== Features ==
The Anhanguera Highway (SP-330) connects the city of São Paulo with the northeastern region of the state, going through industrial cities and important agricultural regions. Its busiest section is São Paulo-Campinas, the first section which was inaugurated. It is 86 km long, it serves the cities of Osasco, Cajamar, Jundiaí, Louveira, Vinhedo, Valinhos and Campinas. Near Valinhos, the SP-330 connects to the Rodovia Dom Pedro I through the Campinas Beltway (SP-083), and near Campinas, it connects to the Rodovia dos Bandeirantes (SP-348) through the Rodovia Santos Dumont (SP-075). Also, in Campinas, the SP-330 connects directly to the Rodovia Dom Pedro I.

Beyond Campinas, the second section goes through the cities of Sumaré, Nova Odessa, Americana, Limeira, Araras, Leme, Pirassununga, Porto Ferreira, Luís Antônio, São Simão, Cravinhos and Ribeirão Preto. The third section, the last to be doubled-laned, goes to Orlândia, São Joaquim da Barra, Guará, Ituverava, Buritizal, Aramina and Igarapava, reaching the border of Minas Gerais state at the Rio Grande, near Uberaba. It is the third longest highway in the state of São Paulo, with 482 km.

The Anhanguera is a four-lane highway. It has heavy traffic, especially trucks. This highway has police bases, assistance bases, gas and services stations. Investments have been made with the installation of security cameras, telephones for emergences, internet, optical fiber and other things to modernize the highway and help the users.

The highway is currently managed by four private companies, and therefore is a toll road:

- AutoBan, from 11 (São Paulo) to 158 km;
- InterVias, from 158 to 240 km;
- AutoVias, from 240 to 318 km;
- ViaNorte, from 318 to 482 km.

== Gallery ==
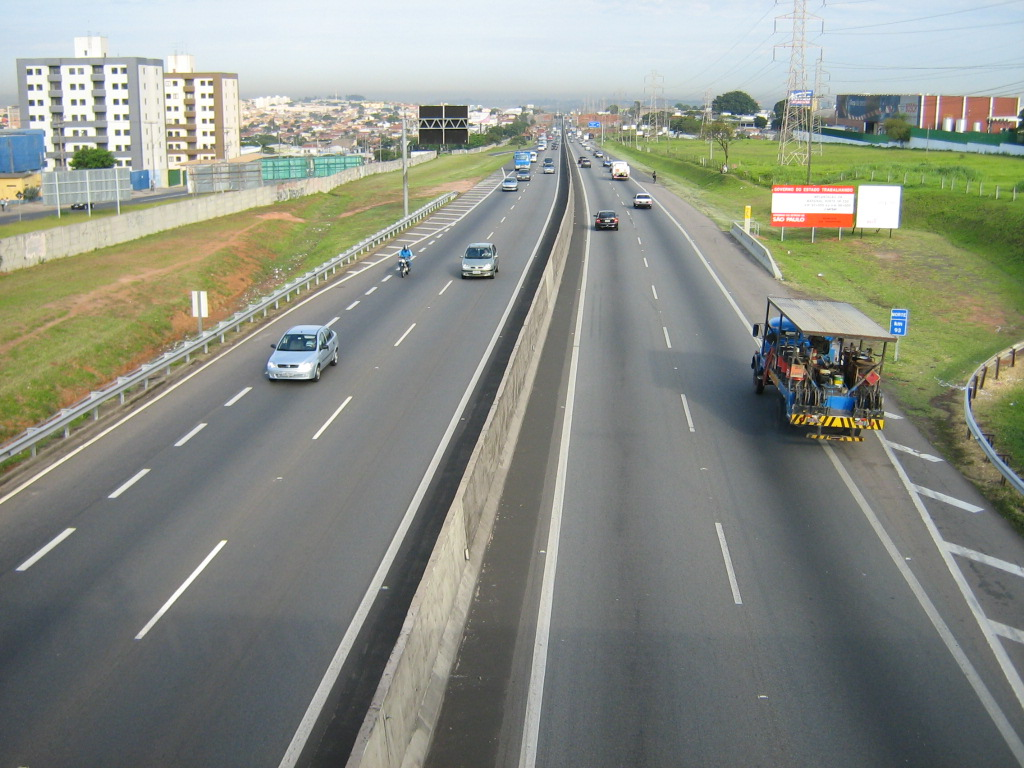
BR-050 in the state of São Paulo

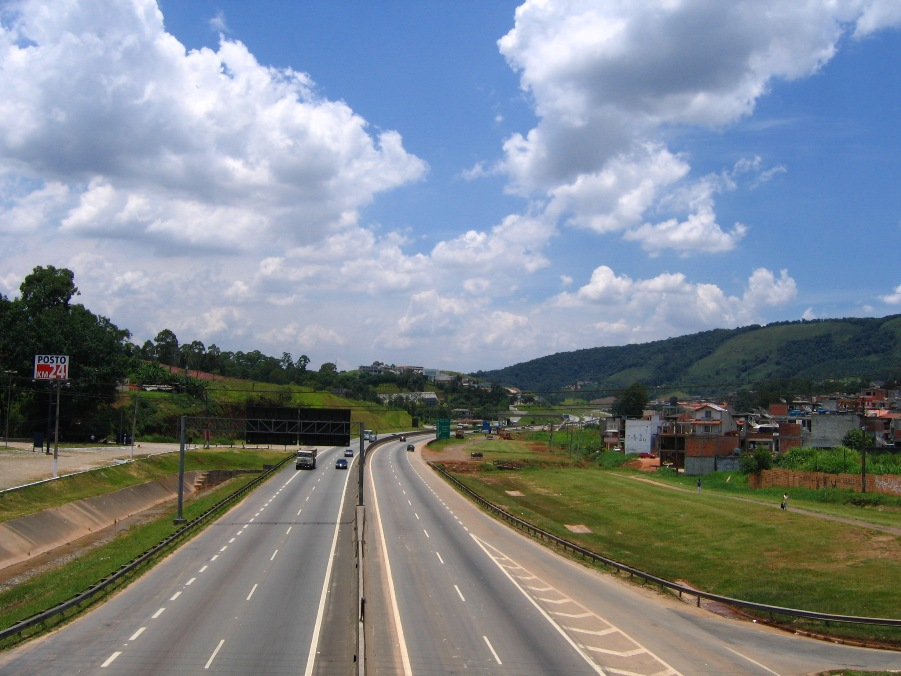
Rodovia Anhanguera (BR-050) in the region of Perus

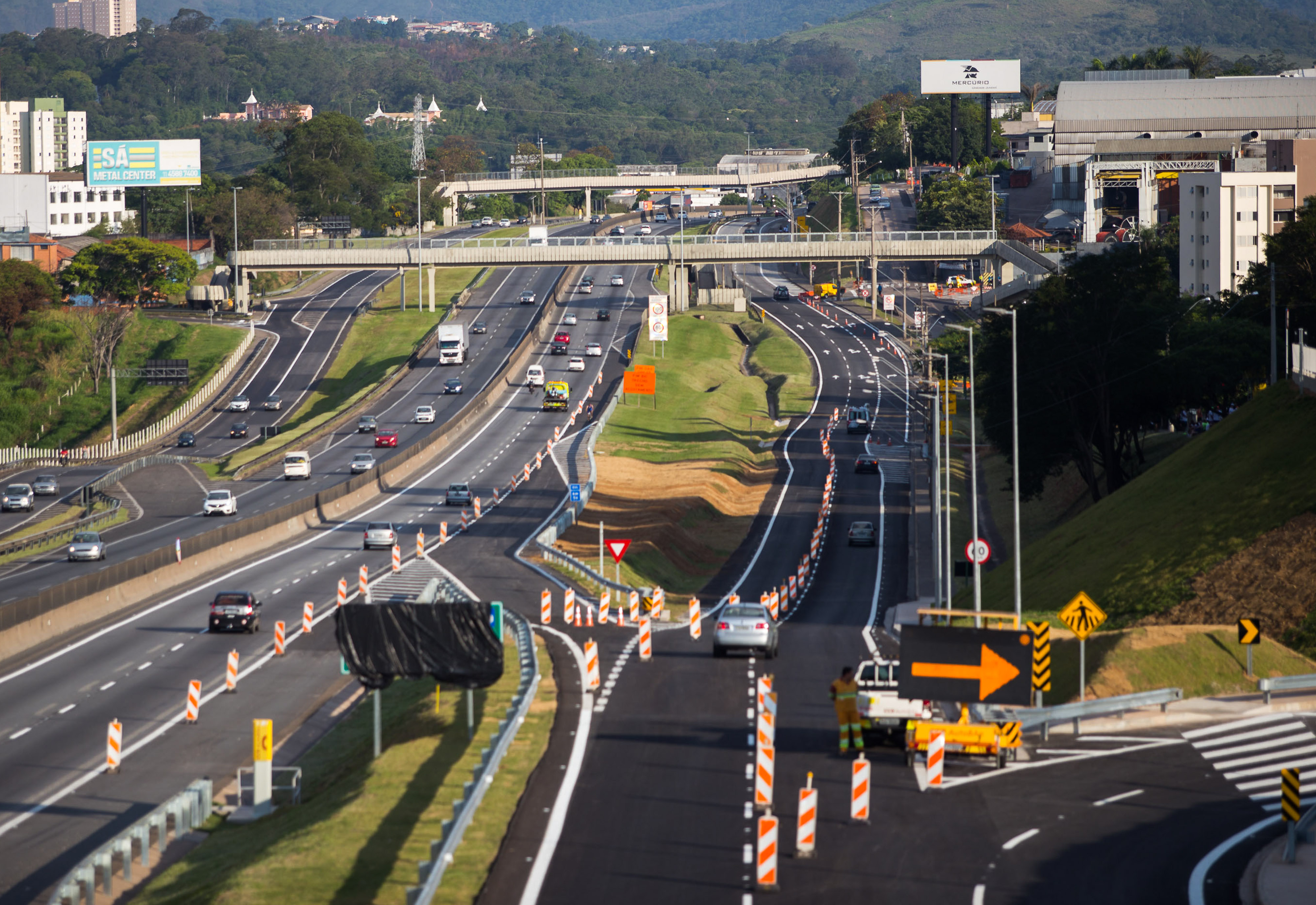
Rodovia Anhanguera (BR-050) in Jundiaí

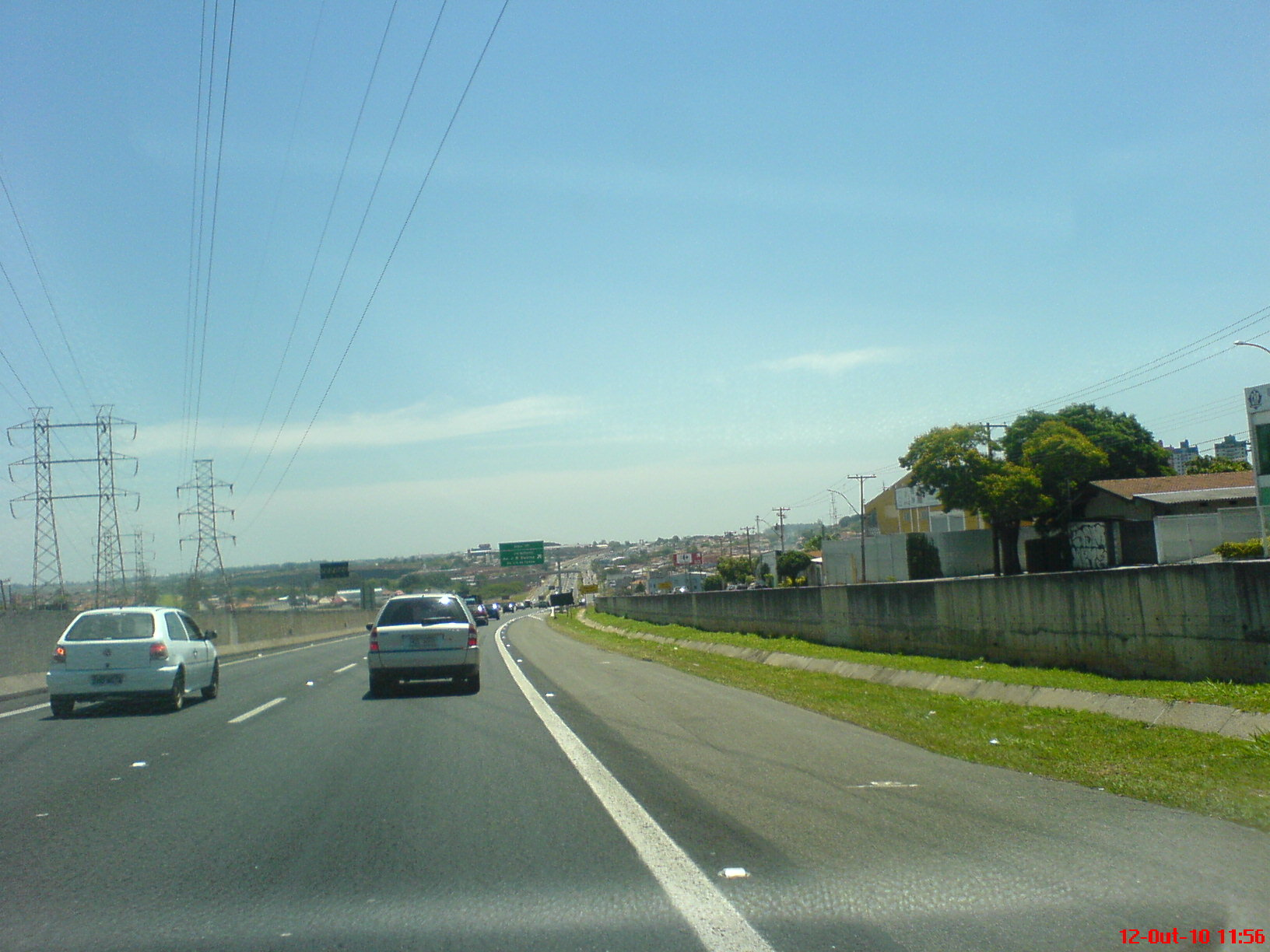
Rodovia Anhanguera (BR-050) in the region of Campinas

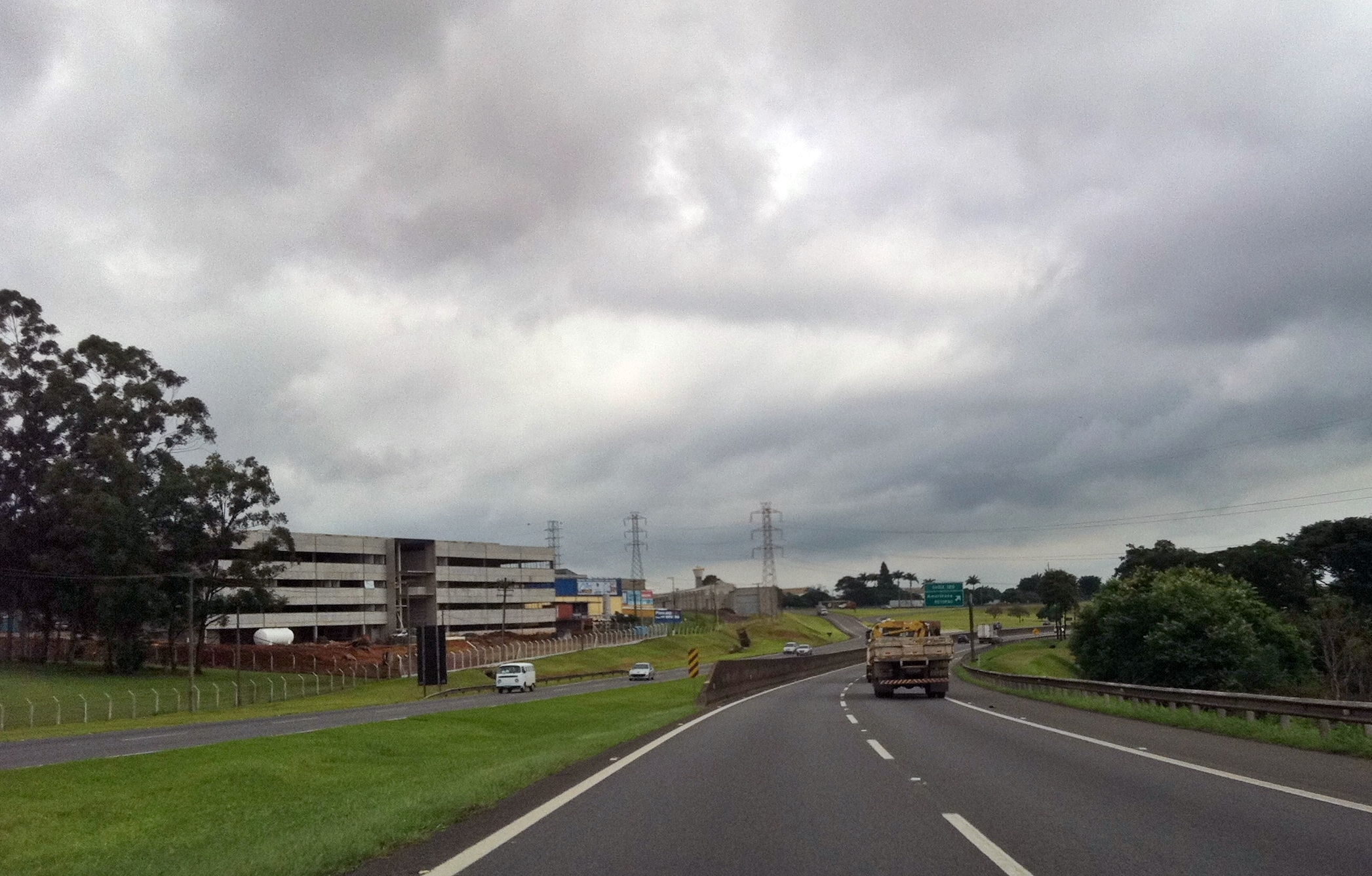
Rodovia Anhanguera (BR-050) in Americana

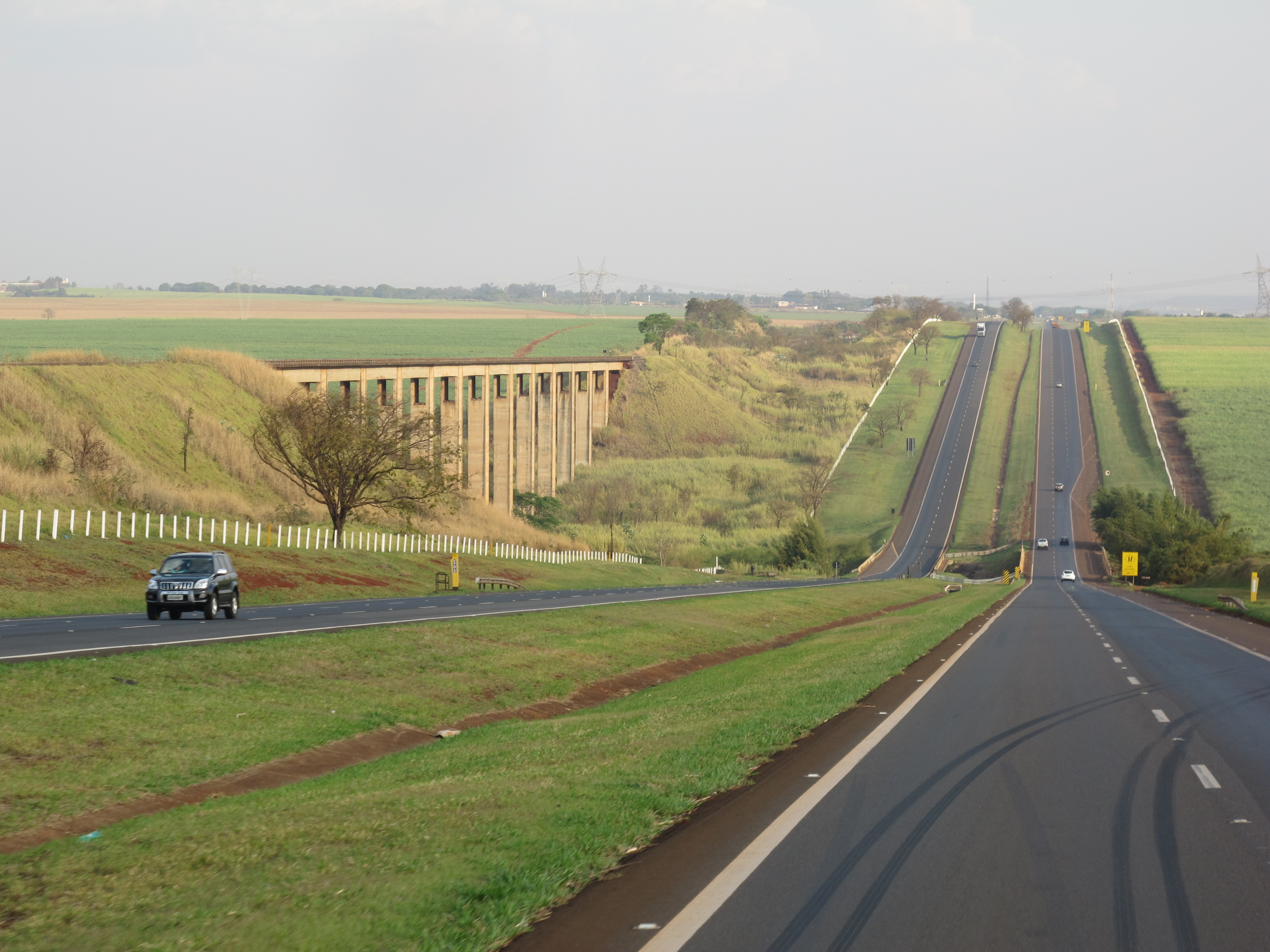
Rodovia Anhanguera (BR-050) near Coqueiros, region near Ribeirão Preto

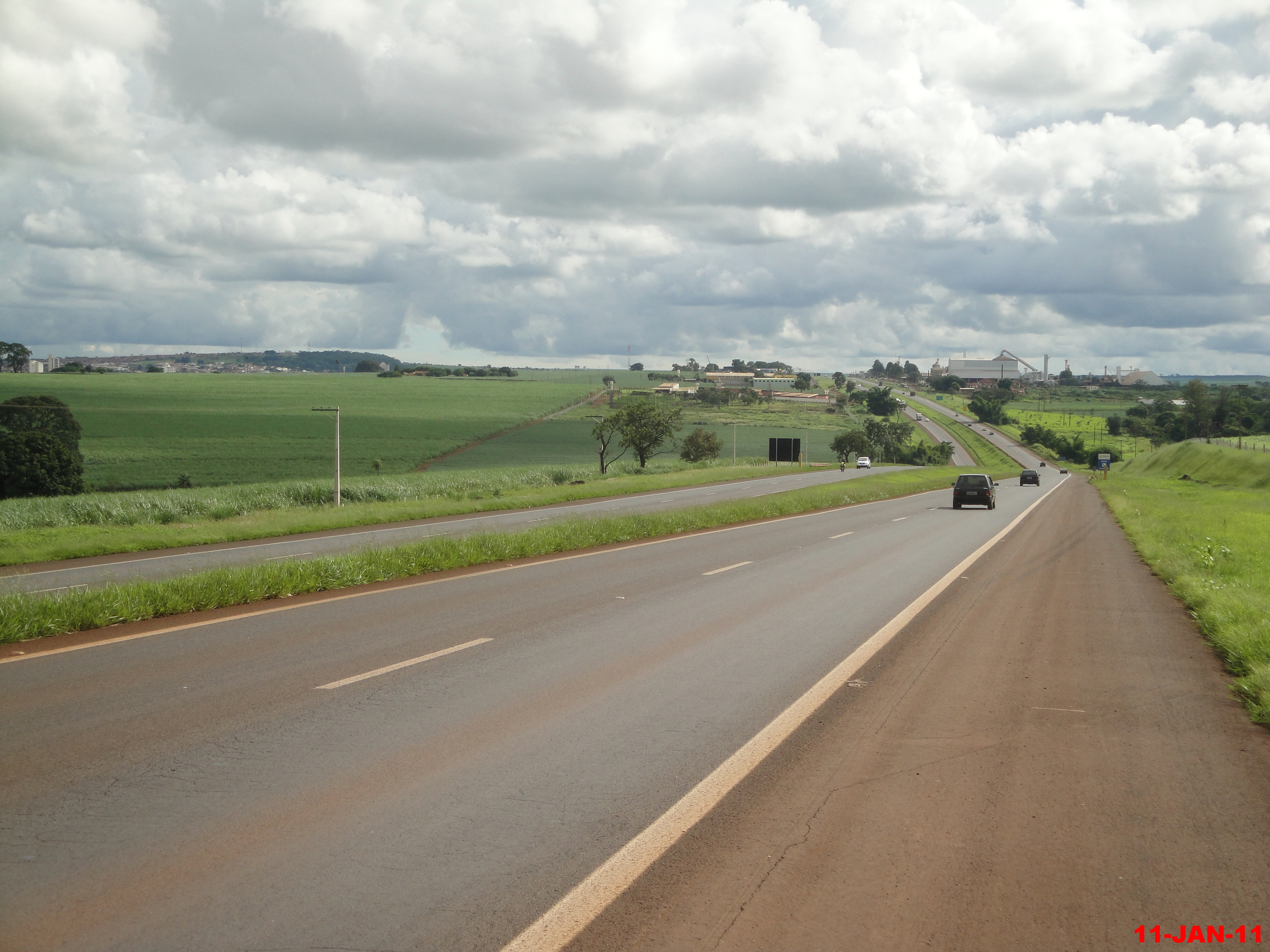
Rodovia Anhanguera (BR-050) near São Joaquim da Barra

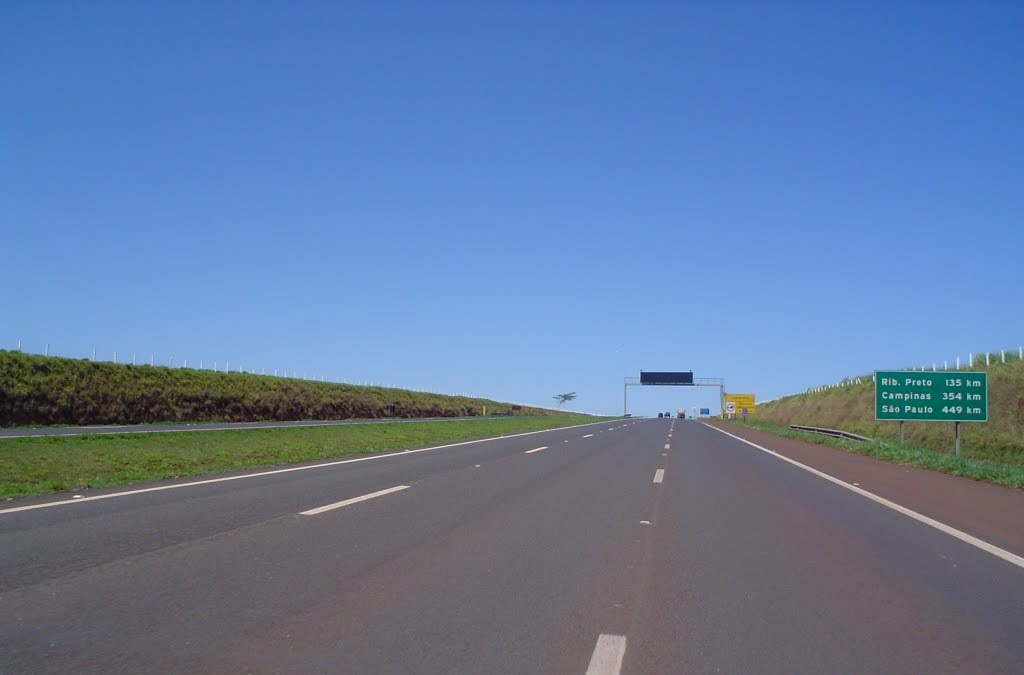
Rodovia Anhanguera (BR-050) in Igarapava

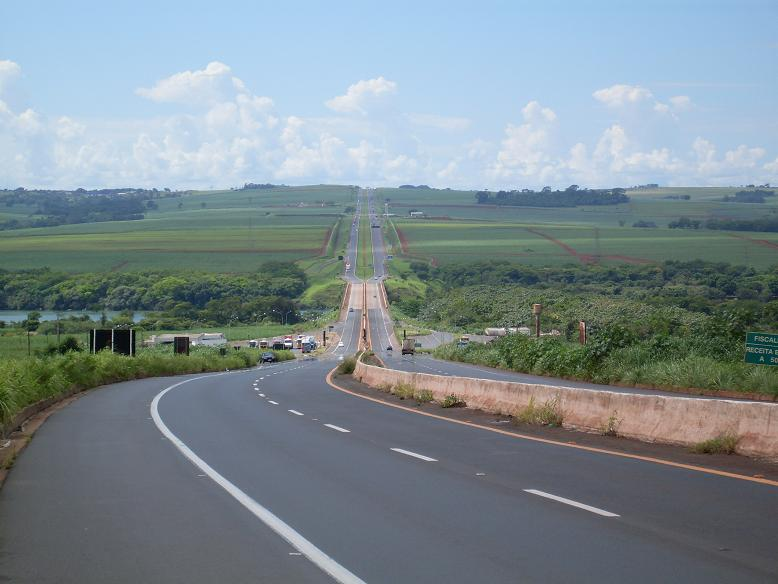
BR 050, border between São Paulo and Minas Gerais

== See also ==
- Highway system of São Paulo
- Brazilian Highway System
