= Bandeirante State =

Location of the Bandeirante State

Bandeirante State (in Portuguese: Estado bandeirante) is a popular and historical name for the Brazilian state of São Paulo. It came into use in the 1900s, with mentions in periodicals such as A Republica, in 1905, and Jornal do Commercio, in 1909. It is also mentioned in the anthem of the municipalities of Barrinha, Mairiporã, Mirandópolis and Santa Albertina.

São Paulo became known as the place from which Bandeiras set out to explore the interior of South America, being the birthplace of several Bandeirantes of significant importance to the history of Brazil, such as Anhangüera, discoverer of Goiás, Domingos Jorge Velho, one of the conquerors of Piauí, and many others who stood out in the founding of Brazilian towns and capitals, such as Belo Horizonte, Curitiba, Cuiabá and Florianópolis.
