= Porto Ferreira State Park =

State park in São Paulo, Brazil

- Parque Estadual Porto Ferreira
- IUCN category II (national park)
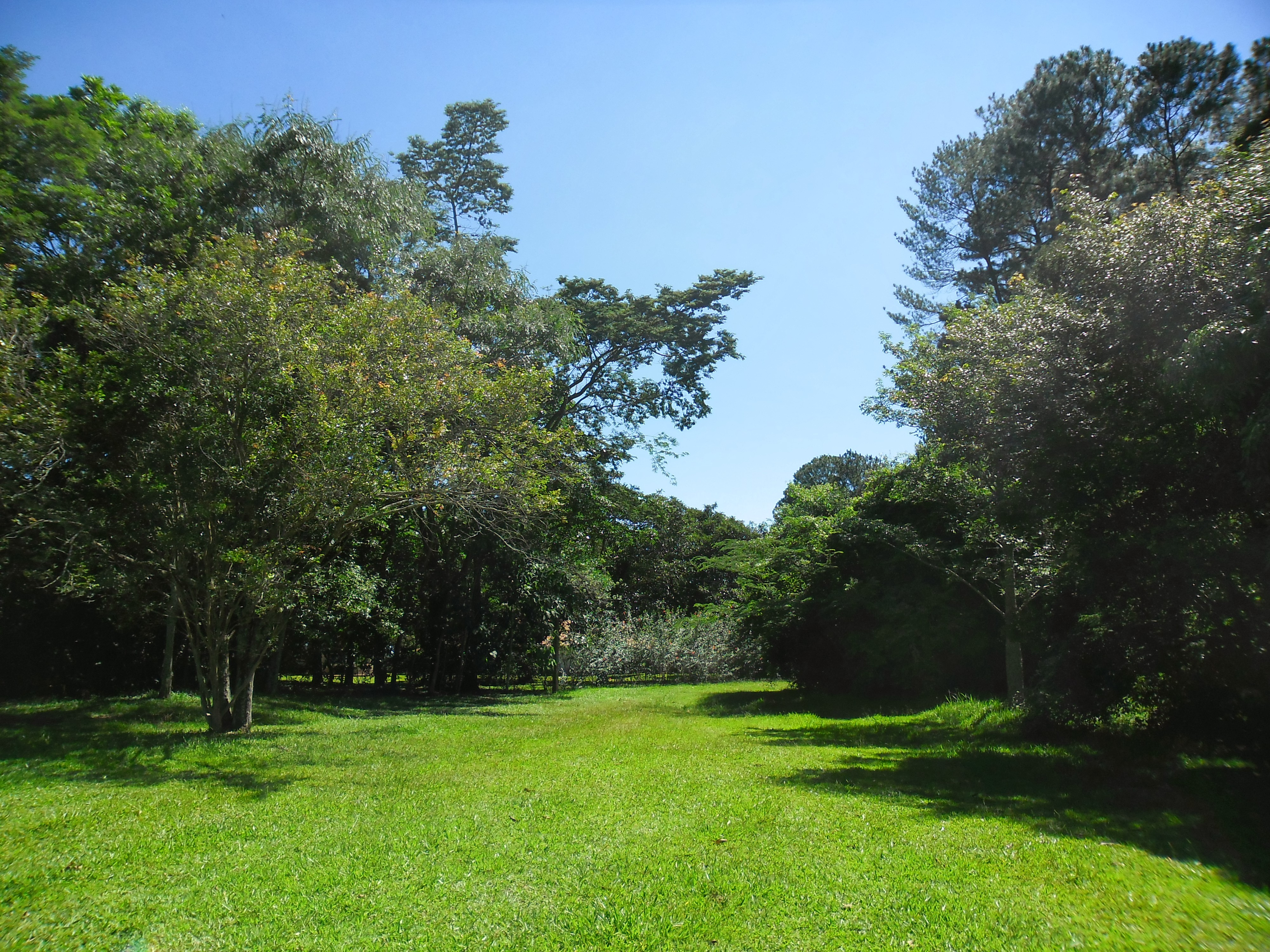
- Parque Estadual de Porto Ferreira

- Location within Brazil
- Nearest city: Porto Ferreira, São Paulo
- Coordinates: 21°50′59″S 47°26′08″W
- Area: 611 ha (1,510 acres)
- Designation: State park
- Created: 12 March 1987
- Administrator: Fundação Florestal

The Porto Ferreira State Park Portuguese: Parque Estadual Porto Ferreira is a state park in the state of São Paulo, Brazil.

== Location ==
The Porto Ferreira State Park is in the municipality of Porto Ferreira, 227 kilometres (141 mi) from the city of São Paulo. It has an area of 611 hectares (1,510 acres).

== History ==
The Porto Ferreira State Reserve as created by decree 40.991 of 6 November 1962. It became the Porto Ferreira State Park by decree 26.891 of 12 March 1987.

== Environment ==
The park has about 180 hectares (440 acres) of cerrado forest, 400 hectares (990 acres) of seasonal semi-deciduous forest and 6 kilometres (3.7 mi) of riparian forest along the banks of the Mogi-Guaçu River. The cerrado holds 200 species of trees including pau-terra, barbartimão, cinzeiro, capitão-do-campo and pimenta-de-macaco. The seasonal semi-deciduous forest includes large species, such as the jequitibá-rosa, figueira, cedro and the peroba.

The forest provides a refuge for species such as the maned wolf (Chrysocyon brachyurus), southern tamandua (Tamandua tetradactyla), lowland paca (Cuniculus paca), titi monkeys, and birds such as undulated tinamou (Crypturellus undulatus) and the turquoise-fronted amazon (Amazona aestiva).

== Sources ==
- Parque Estadual Porto Ferreira completa 50 anos (in Portuguese), Fundação Florestal, 21 November 2012
