= Bartolomeu Bueno da Silva =

Bandeirante from São Paulo state

Anhanguera
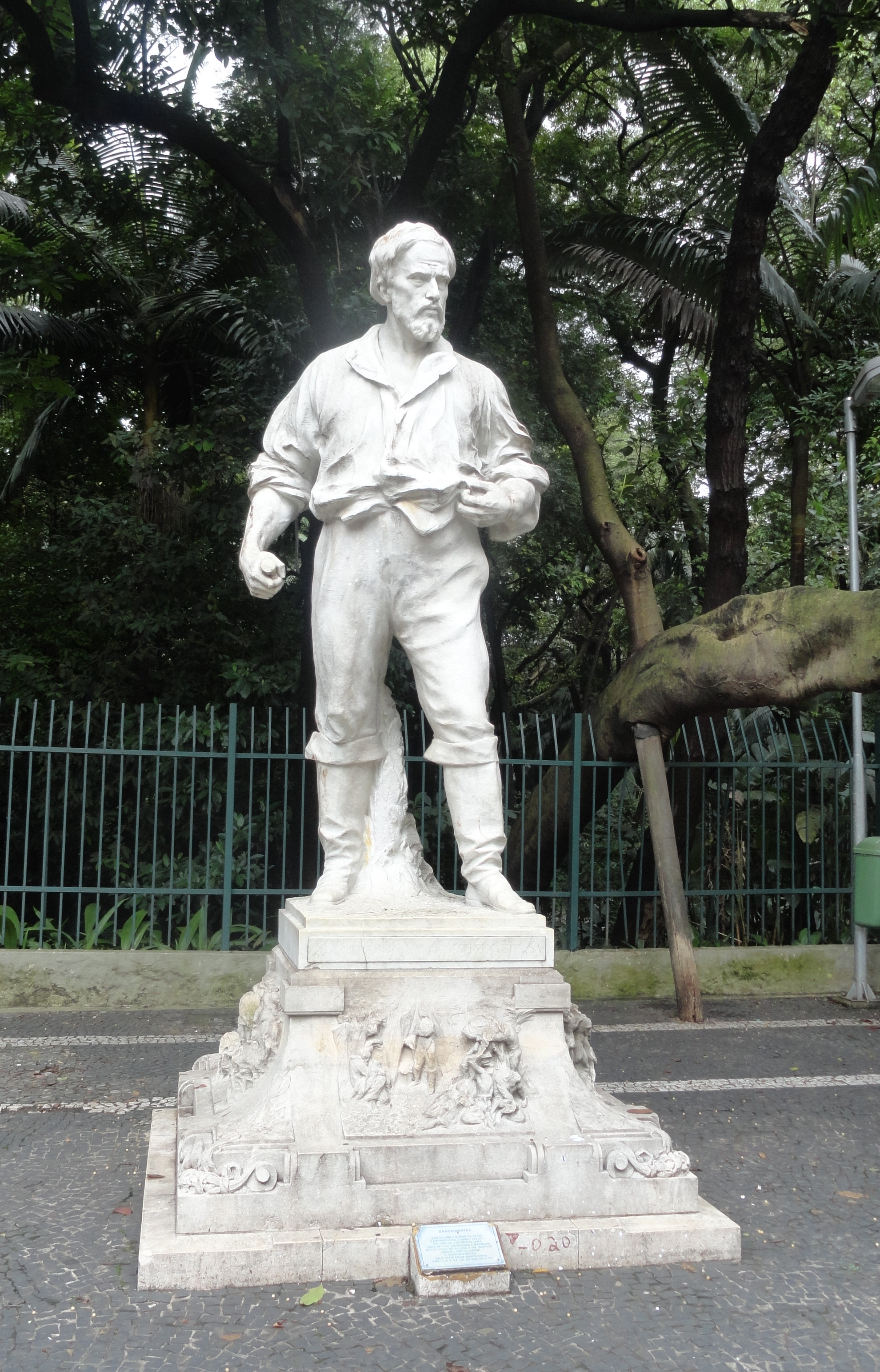
- Statue of Anhanguera at Parque Trianon in São Paulo
- Born: Bartolomeu Bueno da Silva; 1672; Parnayba, Captaincy of São Vicente, State of Brazil, Kingdom of Portugal
- Died: 19 September 1740 (aged 67–68); Villa Boa de Goyaz, Captaincy of São Paulo, State of Brazil, Kingdom of Portugal
- Other names: Anhanguera, o Moço; Segundo Anhanguera; Diabo velho
- Children: 10
- Parent(s): Bartolomeu Bueno da Silva (father); Izabel Cardoso (mother)

Bartolomeu Bueno da Silva, also known as Anhanguera (a transliteration from the Tupi word for "old devil" (1672 – 19 September 1740)), was a bandeirante from the state of São Paulo. At 12 years old, he went to accompany his father, also named Bartolomeu Bueno da Silva, in expeditions into the rural areas of the Captaincy of São Vicente, corresponding to the territory of the modern-day state of Goiás. With the discovery of gold in Minas Gerais, he founded the city of Sabará and, later on, the cities of São João do Paraíso and Pitangui, where he was named an assistant of the district. In 1720, he returned to his hometown of Santana de Parnaíba and created a presentation to Dom João V of Portugal asking for permission to return to Goiás, where his father had found gold. In return, Dom João asked for the right to demand pay for people traversing rios on the way to the mines in Goiás. The offer was accepted, and another expedition began to be organized.

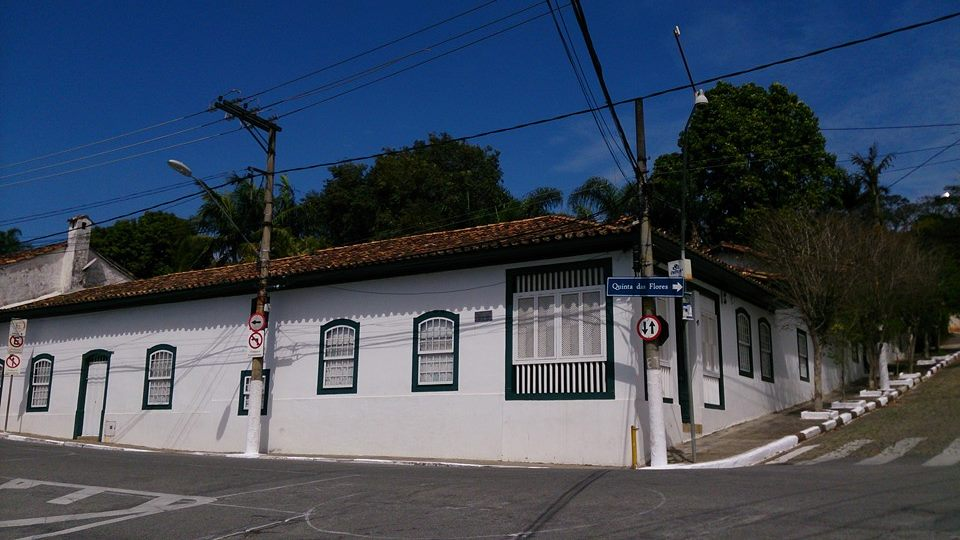
The house in which Silva was born in Santana de Parnaíba

In 1722, he left São Paulo with the intention of traversing the same sertão he had seen with his father forty years prior. Over the course of 3 years, and with great difficulty, he traveled through the sertão in Goiás in search of the legendary Serra dos Martírios. Finally, at over 50 years old, he found gold in the Rio Vermelho. He was named chief captain of the mines by Dom João in 1726 and, later on, coronel of ordinances and chief captain of Vila Boa; he founded Arraial de Santana, which became Vila Boa de Goiás in 1736 (though some sources point to the year 1739, arguing that 1736 just corresponds to the year of transmission of the royal order). The town is currently the city of Goiás.

Cora Coralina, a renowned short story writer and poet from Goiás, describes the arrival of Anhanguera as follows:

Even in front of the old house, on the side of the river there, more than two hundred years ago, nearing to three hundred, the flag of the "Polistas" arrived. The place called Porto da Lapa was where the people of Anhanguera disembarked on 26 July 1728. They disembarked and soon ordered everyone to build Lapa church in honor and glory of Nossa Senhora dos Caminheiros that, after passing through and errors made, without recounting the thickness of the sertão, would bring them, in the end, the right direction of the Goiá tribe.

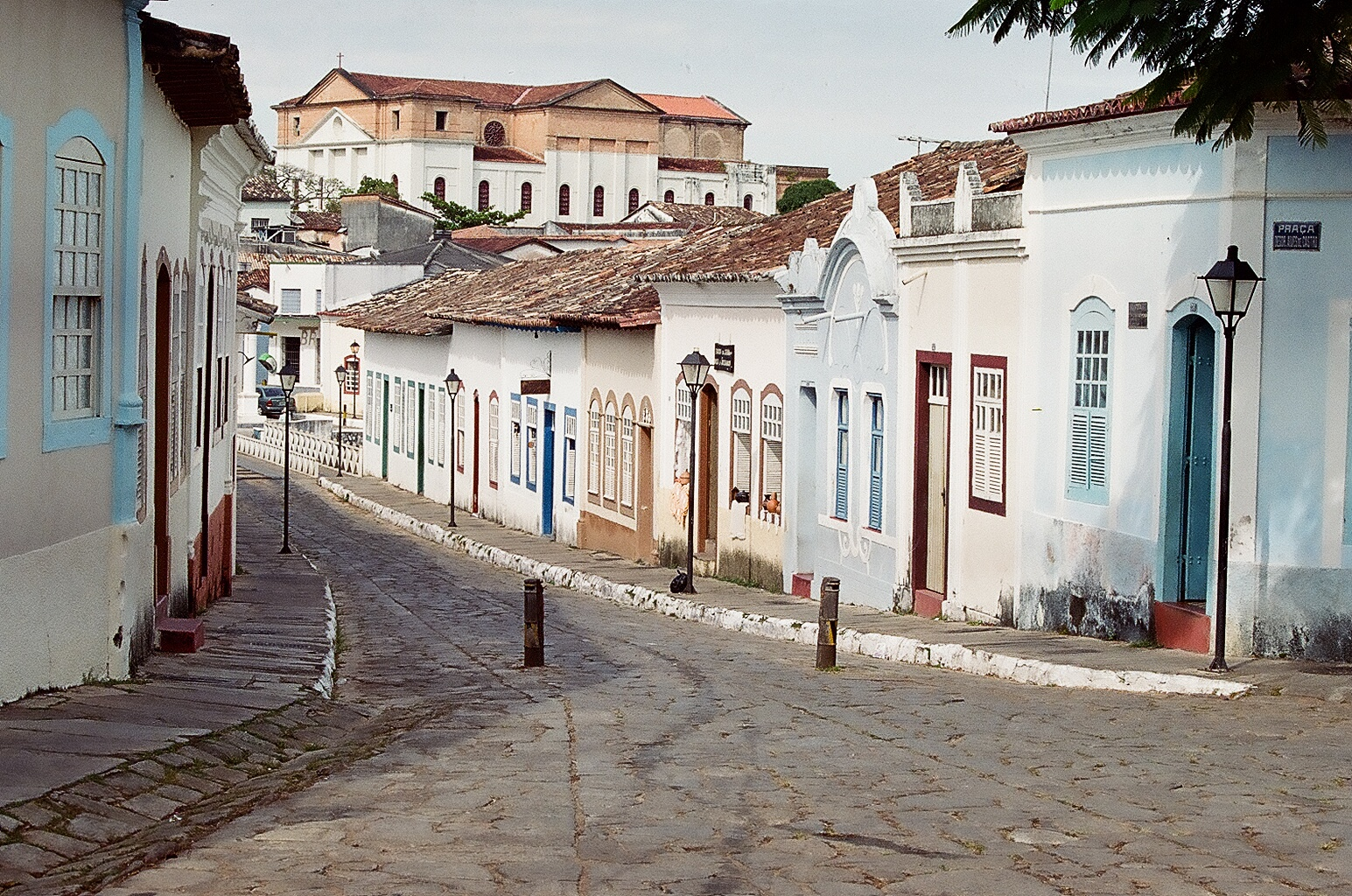
Rua do Conjunto Arquitetônico in the city of Goiás

== Background ==
His father, Bartolomeu Bueno da Silva, the son of Francisco Bueno, was killed during his raids on the Jesuits in Rio Grande do Sul and Filipa Vaz. Bartolomeu senior married Isabel Cardoso and had nine children, among them Bartolomeu Bueno da Silva, the Younger. The family of Cora Coralina is related to the Bueno family. Her great-grandmother was the daughter-in-law of Anhanguera, as told in an excerpt from one of her books:

those especially in old age, widowed and in poverty, had to replace com with their farmers and their daughters, a certain amount of gold, requested by the old Bandeirante and of which the anticipated boon disheartened the King of Portugal. Ugly and petty history that disillusions the generosity of a ruler and of which the chronicler has trouble remembering.

== Final years ==
As a way to diminish the power of Anhanguera and to placate the disputes for the control of the mines, the Count of Sarzedas, the then governor of São Paulo, divided the mines into two districts: Santana and Meia-Ponte. As such, the bandeirante lost his influence as chief ombudsman of the state, becoming instead a captain-major. He was accused of tax evasion in 1733; he began to lose prestige among the monarchy, and his authority was progressively being limited by royal delegates. He also lost his right to travel. The persistence of internal conflict and the suspicions of smuggling led to the establishment of a magistrate and the creation of the Captaincy of Goiás. He died in 1740, left poor and without any power, reduced to a symbolic position, in Vila Boa de Goiás.

Cora Coralina testifies that:

Bartolomeu Bueno da Silva, the Younger, who provided a substantial increase in the wealth of the Portuguese crown, wasted with the discovery of the mines all of the fortune that would have been inherited from his parents, and passed away poor in Vila de Goiás in 1740, truly because the promise of conceding the crown an arroba (~14.7kg) of gold from the income obtained through the extraction of metal was not accomplished, ordering it, this indeed, a restitution of quantities already received, with the capturing of goods of benefit if it had not been carried out.

The race for gold was the fuse for greed and evasion of taxes, which came as part of the denunciations. Meanwhile, it would become easier to evade taxes.

== Historical context ==
The expansion of the bandeirantes into what would become wide swaths of Brazil began at the beginning of the 16th century, in the Captaincy of São Vicente, with the march of the bandeirantes into the sertão in search of natural and mineral riches, such as gold and silver, as well as Indigenous people to enslave. During the 1660s, Bartolomeu Bueno da Silva (the father) emerged as the first Anhanguera.

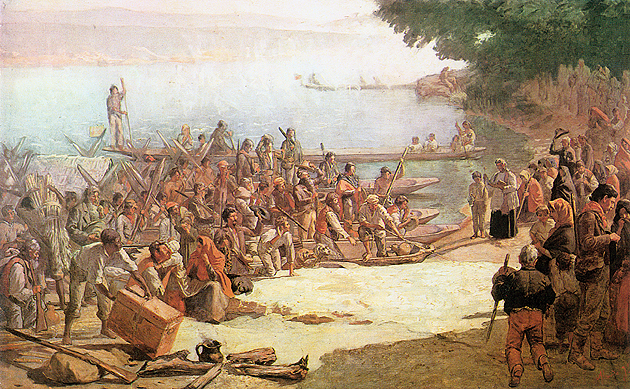
Almeida Júnior - Estudo da Partida da Monção, 1897 (Bandeirantes)

In 1682, the first Anhanguera departed from the Captaincy of São Vicente (now São Paulo) towards the Araguaia River, traversing territory corresponding to the modern-day state of Goiás. The nickname came from a situation during this expedition. It is believed that, returning from the Araguaia, the senior Bartolomeu Bueno da Silva encountered people from the Indigenous Goyá people (also spelled Goiá or Goyazes). At the sight of the Native people richly adorned with golden headwear, he put a fire into a bowl and ordered them to show the source of the metals, threatening to set fire to the rivers and the springs. From that point onward, he was nicknamed Anhanguera (from the Tupi añã'gwea, meaning old devil or old soul). It is believed that, while still a child, the younger Bartolomeu Bueno da Silva began to accompany his father during his expeditions.

The 1730s were a time when the mining industry began to grow. Minas Gerais generated profits in step with the centers that were known for their gold extraction during the reign of Dom João V in Portugal, which is considered to be the most ostentatious period for Portuguese royalty. The metropole acted similarly to the sertanistas to make proportional the discovery of gold in the country. These harmonious relations could best be exemplified in a redacted document by Rodrigo César de Meneses and delivered to the younger Anhanguera, which had established the terms of a contract between Anhanguera and the metropole and demonstrated a joint action between it and the rural parts of São Paulo:

In view of Your Majesty, that God protects, it was served to order me by letter on the 14th of February last year in 1721, signed by your royal hand, adjusted with the Captain Bartolomeu Bueno da Silva the award that there would have been to give, in case that they would have discovered in the sertão of this captaincy mines of gold and silver, and other possessions, and that he gave regiments when he entered with troops to make the discovery in said sertão, and in compliment of the order of said Sir, I demanded him to give this regiment, that had been there to inviolably guard the said Captain Bartolomeu Bueno da Silva.

The bandeirantes' houses resembled forts. They were made of stone walls, both the external walls and the borders of the inner rooms. The constructions set them apart from the average house in the villages of São Paulo and Minas Gerais, from which the primary material was pounded rammed earth. The structure of the houses was made of aroeira tree trunks and reinforced by granite walls, which became an impenetrable residence even with the strength of weapons at the time.

== Expeditions ==
- Serra dos Martírios: it is alleged that, in his youth, the younger Anhanguera was one of the few to have seen the legendary Serra dos Martírios and the Araés in 1673. Joining him was Antônio Pires de Campos, son of bandeirante Manuel de Campos Bicudo.
- Araguaia River: He accompanied his father in an expedition departing from São Paulo towards the sertões of the Planalto Central, crossing what is now the state of Goiás and reaching the Araguaia River. There, he came across the Goyá. They returned to Santana de Parnaíba with thousands of captured Indigenous people, without having inspected the mines, but certain of the presence of gold there.
- Campinas (Caminho dos Goiases): in 1722, they left again from São Paulo, accompanied by an army of 152 armed men, 2 clergymen, and 39 horsemen. The trek took 5 days, even when they built a strategically placed stopping point that, 23 years later, would become the city of Campinas (the path to the modern-day city was opened in 1725). Later on, the extension ran through the Goiases, for 102 kilometers, eventually transforming into the São Paulo macrometropolis, which has more than 22 million people, one of the largest such areas in the world.
- Arraial de Santana: he later would pass through Vila Boa de Goiás. The bandeirante influence on the region was responsible for the beginning of urbanization of the sertão. The city became a major economic and political center of the state, becoming the provincial capital. There is controversy as to when the city was founded, with some sources indicating 1727 and others citing 1725.

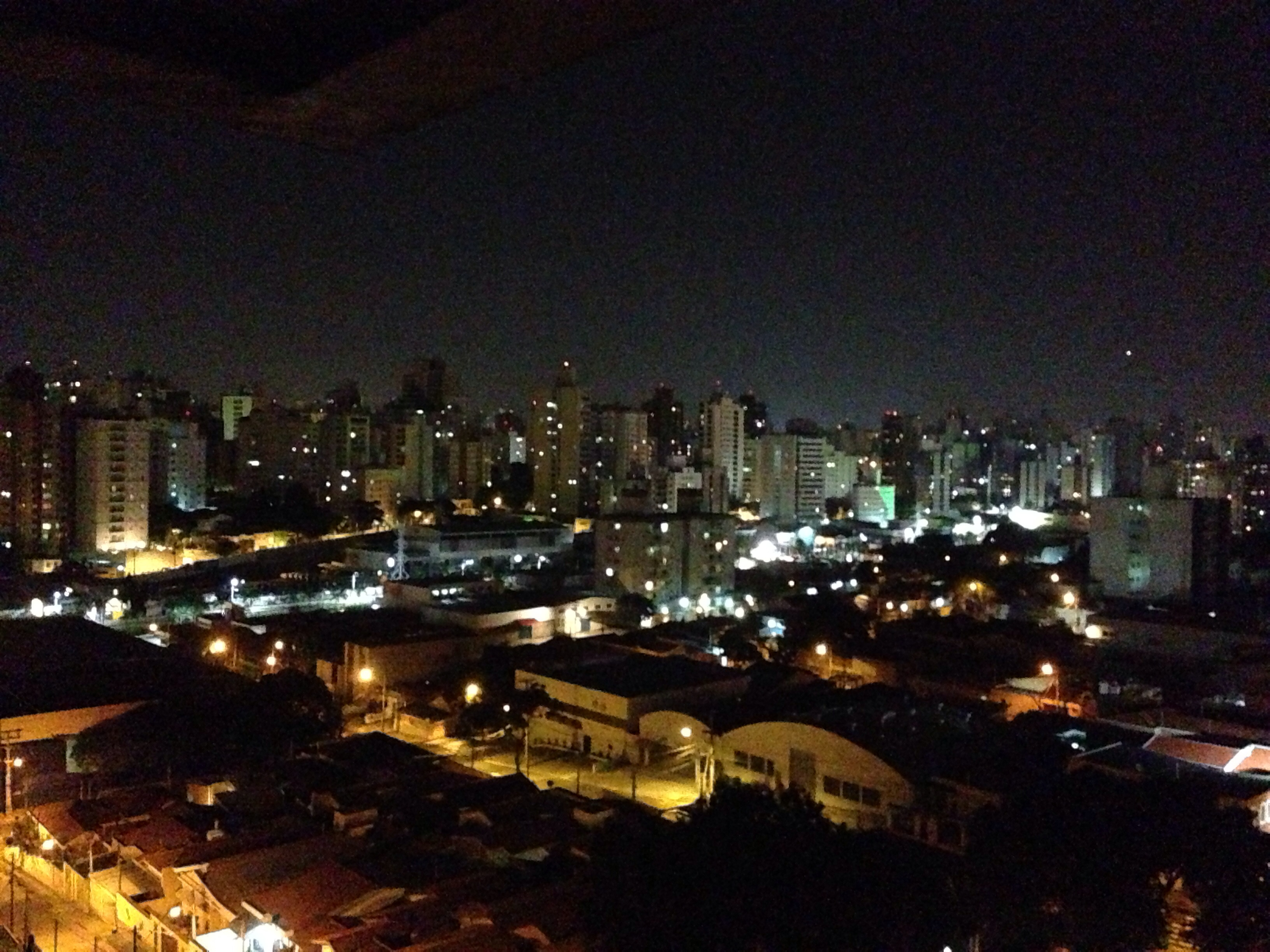
The city of Campinas, in São Paulo state

== The Goyá (or Goyazes) ==
The Goyá people (or Goiá, Goyazes) were the original inhabitants of the Center-West region of Brazil, establishing themselves specifically in the Mato Grosso region of Goiás, a region chosen by the second Anhanguera to establish Arraial de Santana, at the source of the Vermelho river in the Serra Dourada. The group's name inspired the name of the state of Goiás. They were quickly wiped out after the arrival of Anhanguera and the bandeirantes due to disease and the violence of the sertanistas, and as such, could not leave any trace of their existence, be it linguistically or archeologically. It is also believed that one of the reasons for their disappearance was a trend of miscegenation with the Portuguese during this time period.

The Goyazes had previously inhabited the region around the Orinoco River before the Portuguese arrived. After an invasion by the Caribs, a large part of the group fled to the Amazon River to the region now part of the state of Goiás. In the book Raízes do Brasil by Sergio Buarque de Holanda, he makes a brief allusion to the Goyázes, indicating the belief that the central parts of South America had been inhabited by the Goyá. There is the belief that the name Goyá had been wrongly given by the younger Anhanguera to the Kayapó (or Caiapó) people. This hypothesis is supported by the belief that the bandeirantes had that the banks of the Grande River sheltered the Guayana tribe, of Tupi origin. It is also believed that they were wiped out due to outbreaks of cholera. Therefore, with the source of this hypothesis, the anecdote of the rise of the nickname Anhanguera, given first to the elder Bartolomeu Bueno da Silva, would have first appeared on the border of the states of São Paulo and Minas Gerais, and not at the Vermelho river.

== Tributes ==
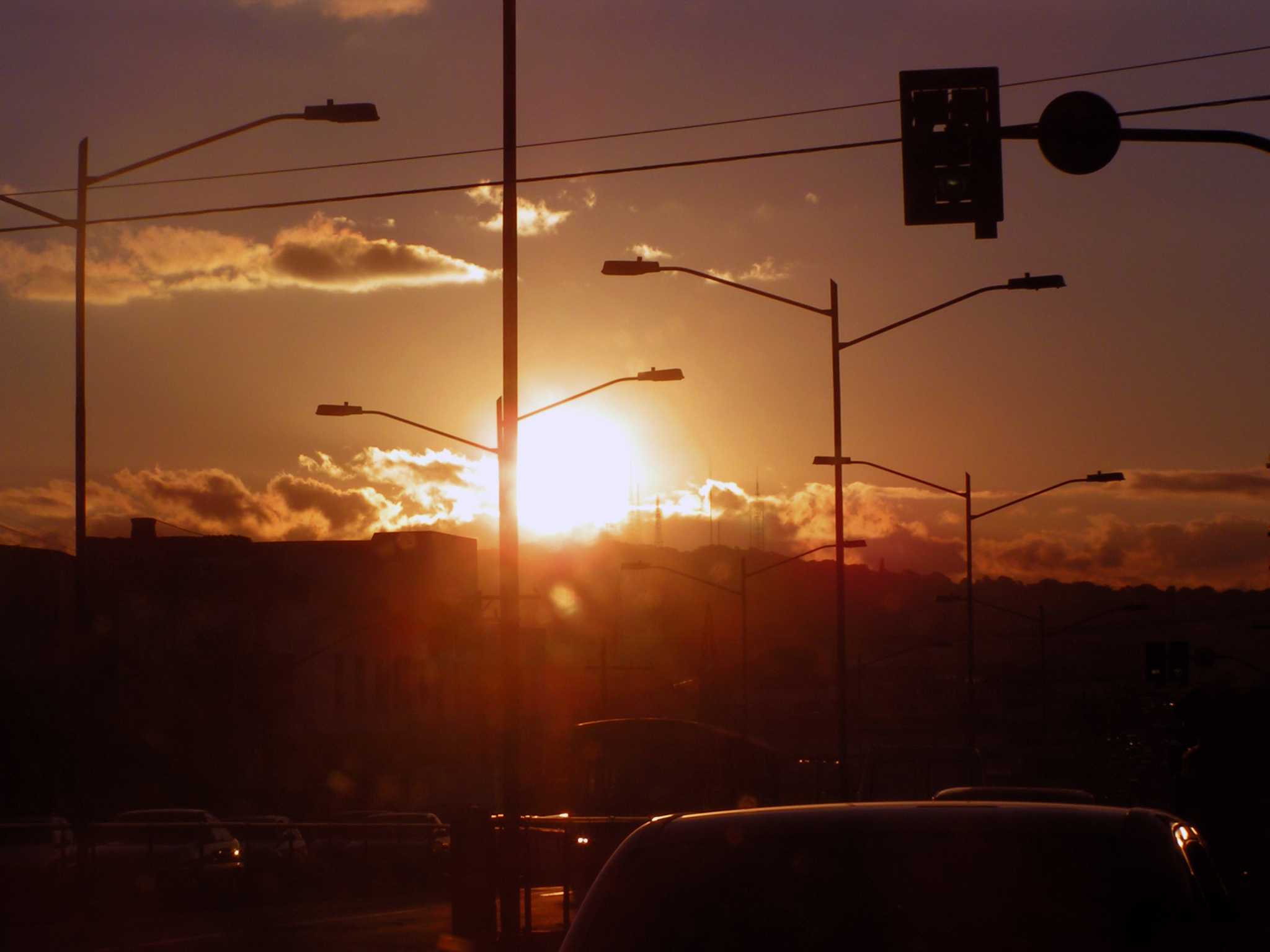
Sunset on Avenida Anhanguera, Goiânia

- The Rodovia Anhanguera in the state of São Paulo was named in homage to him.
- Avenida Anhanguera, one of the most important roads in the capital of Goiás, Goiânia.
- Monumento ao Bandeirante, in Goiânia.
- Anhanguera, a town in Goiás.
- Rede Anhanguera, a conglomerate of stations affiliated with Globo, has its presence in Goiás and Tocantins.
- Anhanguera, a district of the city of São Paulo that is part of the subdistrict of Perus.
- Faculdades Anhanguera, a university center and educational hub.
- ETEC Bartolomeu Bueno da Silva, located in Santana de Parnaíba.
- Rua Bartolomeu Bueno da Silva, in Guarulhos.
- Anhanguera Park, situated in the extreme northwest of São Paulo in the Perus neighborhood.

These tributes also include the various plazas and roads in cities in the rural parts of Goiás and Tocantins.
