= Mojiguaçu River =

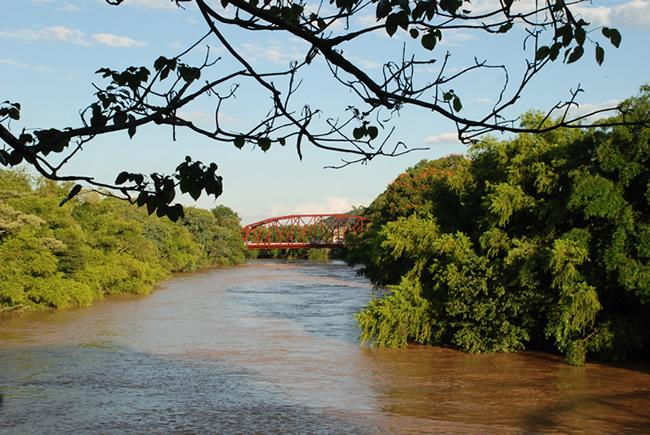

Location
- Country: Brazil

Physical characteristics
- Source
  - location: São Paulo state
- Mouth
  - location: Rio Pardo
  - coordinates: 20°53′16″S 48°10′39″W
- Length: 473 km (294 mi)
- Basin size: 14,463 km^{2} (5,584 sq mi)

The Mojiguaçu River (Portuguese, Rio Mojiguaçu) or Moji-Guaçu River or Mogi-Guaçu River is a river of the southeastern Brazil. Mojiguaçu River originates in Bom Repouso, placed in the Mantiqueira Mountains, in the state of Minas Gerais and flows to northwest, crossing many municipalities of the state of São Paulo draining into the Pardo River, being a tributary of this river, which is a tributary of the Grande River.

The name "Mojiguaçu" comes from the Tupi language, meaning "big river that snakes".

In Pirassununga, in Cachoeira de Emas district, there is a touristic point around the river, with some restaurants specialised in fisheries, a museum and an old bridge over the river. In addition, in this district there are two important institutions of research and studies about fish conservation and aquaculture.

In Porto Ferreira the river forms the southern boundary of the Porto Ferreira State Park, created in 1987.
