= Jair Rodrigues =

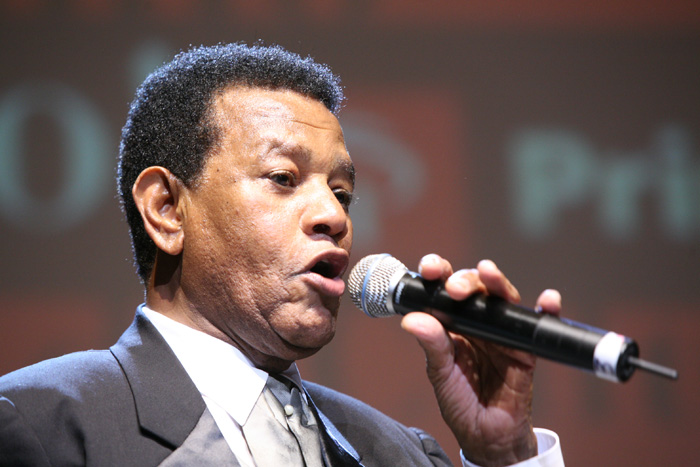

Background information
- Born: Jair Rodrigues de Oliveira; February 6, 1939; Igarapava, São Paulo, Brazil
- Died: May 8, 2014 (aged 75) Cotia, São Paulo, Brazil
- Genres: Latin/Pop
- Occupations: Singer, businessman
- Instrument: Vocals guitar percussion
- Label: Columbia Records

Jair Rodrigues de Oliveira (February 6, 1939 – May 8, 2014) was a Brazilian musician and singer. He is the father of Luciana Mello and Jair Oliveira, who also followed in his footsteps and became musicians.

== Biography ==
Born in Igarapava, Rodrigues grew up in Nova Europa, a city in the interior of the state of São Paulo, where he lived until 1954. Thereafter he moved with his family to São Carlos, where he started his musical career, as the city had the best nightlife in the region.

His career began when he crooned in São Carlos during the mid-to-late-1950s. He also participated in various functions with Radio São Carlos.

In 1958, Jair joined the São Carlos military reserve. At the start of the 1960s, he gained popularity in the state capital as a singer on various television programs for new musical talent. In 1965, he and Elis Regina successfully sang together on "O Fino da Bossa", a television program on TV Record.

In 1966 Jair sang at the "Record Festival" with the song "Disparada" by Geraldo Vandré and Théo de Barros, this time in conjunction with Quarteto Novo. Known for singing sambas, Jair surprised the audience with a beautiful interpretation of the song. "Disparada" and Chico Buarque's "Banda", sung by Nara Leao, were the favorites. The competition ended in a draw. From that moment on, his career took off and his talent experienced decades of success. Jair released an album a year and performed hits such as O Menino da Porteira, Boi da Cara Preta and Majestade o Sabiá. He has toured Europe, the United States and Japan. In 1971, he recorded the samba-enredo Festa para um Rei Negro for GRES Acadêmicos do Salgueiro from Rio de Janeiro.

He was a supporter of Santos FC and was honored by Torcida Jovem at the 2020 Carnival.

Rodrigues died in Cotia on May 8, 2014.

== Discography ==
Elis Regina and Jair Rodrigues, 1972.

- Vou de samba com você (1964)
- O samba como ele é (1964)
- Dois na Bossa – Elis Regina & Jair Rodrigues (1965)
- O sorriso do Jair (1966)
- Dois na Bossa nº 2 – Elis Regina & Jair Rodrigues (1966)
- Dois na Bossa nº 3 – Elis Regina & Jair Rodrigues (1967)
- Jair (1967)
- Menino rei da alegria (1968)
- Jair de todos os sambas (1969)
- Jair de todos os sambas nº 2 (1969)
- Talento e bossa de Jair Rodrigues (1970)
- É isso aí (1971)
- Festa para um rei negro (1971)
- Com a corda toda (1972)
- Orgulho de um sambista (1973)
- Abra um sorriso novamente (1974)
- Jair Rodrigues dez anos depois (1974)
- Ao vivo no Olympia de Paris (1975)
- Eu sou o samba (1975)
- Minha hora e vez (1976)
- Estou com o samba e não abro (1977)
- Pisei chão (1978)
- Antologia da seresta (1979)
- Couro comendo (1979)
- Estou lhe devendo um sorriso (1980)
- Antologia da seresta nº 2 (1981)
- Alegria de um povo (1981)
- Jair Rodrigues de Oliveira (1982)
- Carinhoso (1983)
- Io e te(San Remo 1984, Italian songs (1984)
- Luzes do prazer (1984)
- Jair Rodrigues (1985)
- Jair Rodrigues (1988)
- Lamento sertanejo (1991)
- Viva meu samba (1994)
- Eu sou... Jair Rodrigues (1996)
- De todas as bossas (1998)
- 500 anos de folia-100% ao vivo (1999)
- 500 anos de folia vol. 2 (2000)
- Intérprete (2002)
- A nova bossa (2004)
- Alma negra (2005)
- Jair Rodrigues – Programa Ensaio – Brasil 1991 (CD e DVD, 2006)
- Festa Para Um Rei Negro (CD e DVD, 2009)
- Samba mesmo vol. 1 (2014)
- Samba mesmo vol. 2 (2014)
