= Porto Ferreira =

- Municipality
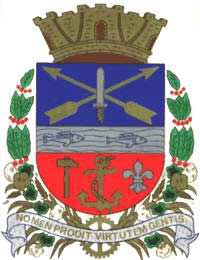
- Flag Coat of arms

- Location in São Paulo state

- Location in Brazil
- Coordinates: 21°51′14″S 47°28′44″W
- Country: Brazil
- Region: Southeast
- State: São Paulo
- Mesoregion: Campinas
- Microregion: Pirassununga

Government
  - Mayor: Rômulo Rippa (PSD)

Area
  - Total: 244.9 km^{2} (94.6 sq mi)
- Elevation: 559 m (1,834 ft)

Population (2020)
  - Total: 56,504
  - Density: 230.7/km^{2} (597.6/sq mi)
- Time zone: UTC−3 (BRT)
- Postal code: 1366-000
- Area code: (19)

Porto Ferreira is a municipality in the state of São Paulo in Brazil. It is situated on the Mojiguaçu River at an altitude of 559 meters. The population is 56,504 (2020 est.) in an area of 244.9 km^{2}.

== History ==
The valley where Porto Ferreira now lies used to be inhabited by Payaguá people. The settlement Porto Ferreira on the Mojiguaçu River was founded in the 1860s, at the place of a ferry. It was named Ferreira after the ferryman João Inácio Ferreira. The settlement grew because of its strategic location on the way to the coffee plantations in the region of Ribeirão Preto. Porto Ferreira was officially established on 9 February 1888, as a part of the municipality Descalvado. It was detached from Descalvado and attached to Pirassununga on 1 October 1892. It became an independent municipality on 29 July 1896.

== Demography ==
As of the 2010 census:

- Total population: 58.797
- Urban: 56.901
- Rural: 1.896
- Male: 29.240
- Female: 29.550
- Infant mortality up to 1 year (for a thousand): 12,76
- Life expectancy (years): 81,82
- Fertility rate (children per woman): 1,95
- Literacy rate: 96.34%
- Human Development Index (IDH-M): 0,812
- IDH-M Income: 0,845
- IDH-M Longevity: 0,850
- IDH-M Education: 0,880 (Source: IPEA DATE)

Per capita income: U$$3879,56 (estimative of 2010) Urbanization rate: 96.61% Annual Population Growth rate: 1.86% Number of hospital beds: 45 (per thousand inhabitants - 0,73)

Population that has access:

- Water supply: 98.5%
- Sewage: 97.6%
- Garbage collection: 100%

Source: IBGE

== Geography ==
The highest point of the city is the High Mount, with 798 meters. The lowest point is the Island of the Ducks, with 545 meters. In the Railroad station the altitude is of 549.7 meters above sea level.

The municipality holds the 611 hectares (1,510 acres) Porto Ferreira State Park, created in 1987.

=== Climate ===
annual average

- Temperature: 23 °C annual total
- Precipitation: 1300-1500 millimeters
- Predominant wind direction: Southeast

=== Topography ===
The general city landscape is flat, with small hills, slightly sloping towards the basins of the Moji Guaçu river and its tributaries. To the north, is possible to see some mountains.

=== Transportation ===
The city is served by two state highways, Rodovia Anhangüera (SP 330), SP 215. There are also the disused rails from the former state railway company, FEPASA.

=== Soil ===
Four types of soil are found, thus distributed for the area of the city: Yellow Red Latosol (62 km ²), Purple Latosol (74 km ²), Hidromórfico (27 km ²) and Dark Red Latosol (77 km ²).

=== Hydrography ===
- Mojiguaçu River
- River Santa Rosa
- Amaros stream

== Tourism ==
Tourism in Porto Ferreira is closely associated with the production and retail sale of artistic ceramics, tableware, furniture and home decoration. The municipality was designated the National Capital of Artistic Ceramics and Decoration in 2017 and became a Municipality of Tourist Interest in 2019. Much of its shopping tourism is concentrated along Avenida do Comércio and in nearby factory outlets. Nature-based tourism is represented by Porto Ferreira State Park, which protects 611.55 hectares (1,511.2 acres) of cerrado, seasonal semideciduous forest and riparian vegetation along the Mojiguaçu River. The park offers trails and opportunities for observing birds, native vegetation and other wildlife.

== Media ==
In telecommunications, the city was served by Telecomunicações de São Paulo. In July 1998, this company was acquired by Telefónica, which adopted the Vivo brand in 2012. The company is currently an operator of cell phones, fixed lines, internet (fiber optics/4G) and television (satellite and cable).

== Religion ==
Christianity is present in the city as follows:

=== Catholic Church ===
The Catholic church in the municipality is part of the Roman Catholic Diocese of Limeira.

=== Protestant Church ===
The most diverse evangelical beliefs are present in the city, mainly Pentecostal, including the Assemblies of God in Brazil (the largest evangelical church in the country), Christian Congregation in Brazil, among others. These denominations are growing more and more throughout Brazil.
