= Subprefecture of Perus =

Coordinates: 23°24′36″S 46°44′50″W

- Subprefecture
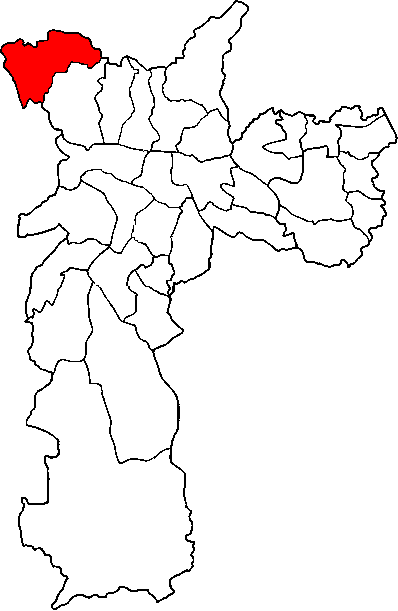
- Location of the Subprefecture of Perus in São Paulo

- Location of municipality of São Paulo within the State of São Paulo
- Country: Brazil
- Region: Southeast
- State: São Paulo
- Municipality: São Paulo
- Administrative Zone: Northwest
- Districts: Anhanguera, Perus

Government
  - Type: Subprefecture
  - Subprefect: Celso Capato

Area
  - Total: 56.88 km^{2} (21.96 sq mi)

Population (2008)
  - Total: 148,226
- Website: Subprefeitura Perus (Portuguese)

The Subprefecture of Perus is one of 32 subprefectures of the city of São Paulo, Brazil. It comprises two districts: Anhanguera and Perus.
