= Anhangüera I =

Anhangüera
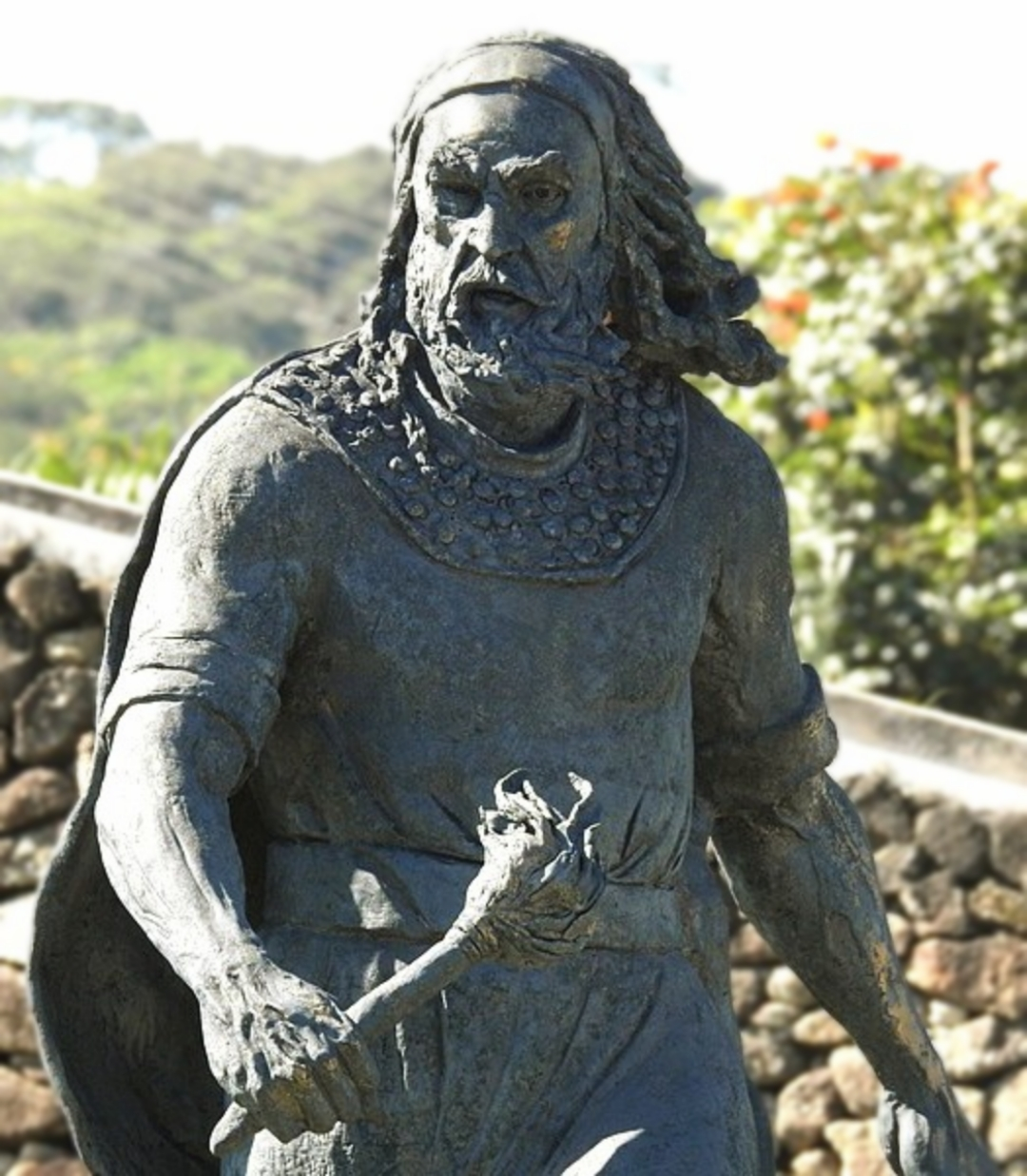
- Statue of Anhangüera at the Monument to Bandeirantes, in Santana de Parnaíba, São Paulo
- Born: Bartholomeu Bueno da Silva c. 1634; Parnahyba, Captaincy of São Vicente, Kingdom of Portugal
- Died: Probably died in the Captaincy of São Vicente, at an unknown date and place
- Occupation: Explorer
- Known for: Bandeirante and founder of Mogi Mirim
- Children: 10
- Parent(s): Francisco Bueno (father); Filipa Vaz (mother)
- Relatives: Amador Bueno (uncle)

Anhangüera I, sometimes also referred to as 1st Anhangüera or just Anhangüera, was the nickname of Bartholomeu Bueno da Silva, a Paulista bandeirante born in Santana de Parnaíba in the 17th century. Anhangüera was part of the first bandeiras who, driven by the economic difficulties that São Paulo had faced since its foundation, chose to explore the interior of South America in search of mineral resources.

On his first expeditions, he was accompanied by his 12-year-old son, Bartholomeu Bueno da Silva, the future founder of Goiás.

== Etymology ==
According to legend, during his expeditions, the bandeirante discovered that the natives were hiding a large quantity of gold, and in order to take the metal with him, he used a trick: he took a small vessel, filled it with cachaça, set it on fire and threatened to set fire to the river. This would have scared the natives, and they named him 'Anhangüera,' which means 'old devil' in the Tupi language.

== Biography ==
He was the son of the bandeirante Francisco Bueno and Filipa Vaz, both natives of the Captaincy of São Vicente (today part of state of São Paulo). On his paternal side, Anhangüera was the grandson of the Sevillian Jew Bartolomeu Bueno de Ribeira and the Cabocla Maria Pires, a descendant of the chief Piquerobi.
