= São Joaquim da Barra =

- Municipality
- Flag Coat of arms

- Location in São Paulo state

- Location in Brazil
- Coordinates: 20°34′51″S 47°51′18″W
- Country: Brazil
- Region: Southeast
- State: São Paulo

Area
  - Total: 411 km^{2} (159 sq mi)

Population (2020)
  - Total: 52,319
  - Density: 127/km^{2} (330/sq mi)
- Time zone: UTC−3 (BRT)

São Joaquim da Barra is a municipality in the state of São Paulo in Brazil. The population is 52,319 (2020 est.) in an area of 411 km^{2} (159 sq mi). The elevation is 625 m.

== See also ==
- List of municipalities in São Paulo
