= Igarapava =

Municipality in São Paulo, Brazil

- Municipality
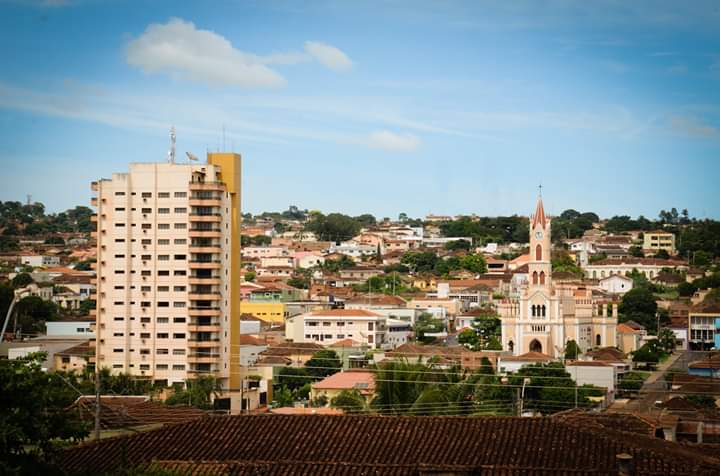
- View of Igarapava

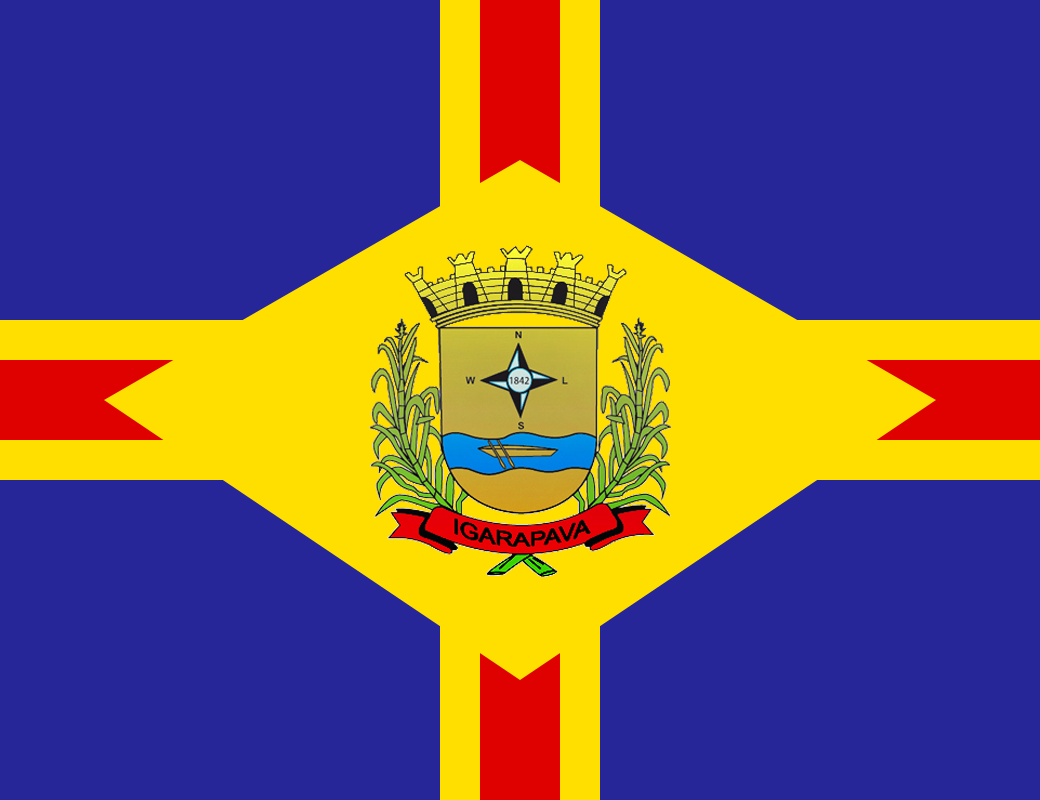
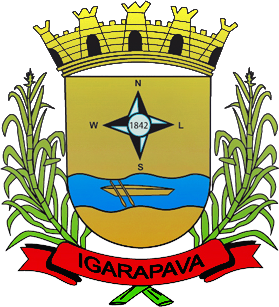
- Flag Coat of arms

- Location in São Paulo state

- Location in Brazil
- Coordinates: 20°2′18″S 47°44′49″W
- Country: Brazil
- Region: Southeast
- State: São Paulo

Area
  - Total: 468 km^{2} (181 sq mi)

Population (2020)
  - Total: 30,614
  - Density: 65.4/km^{2} (169/sq mi)
- Time zone: UTC−3 (BRT)

Igarapava is a municipality in the state of São Paulo in Brazil. The population is 30,614 (2020 est.) in an area of 468 km^{2}. It is the hometown of the Música popular brasileira (MPB) singer Jair Rodrigues.

== Media ==
In telecommunications, the city was served by Telecomunicações de São Paulo. In July 1998, this company was acquired by Telefónica, which adopted the Vivo brand in 2012. The company is currently an operator of cell phones, fixed lines, internet (fiber optics/4G) and television (satellite and cable).

== See also ==
- List of municipalities in São Paulo
