= Anhanguera (district of São Paulo) =

District of São Paulo, Brazil

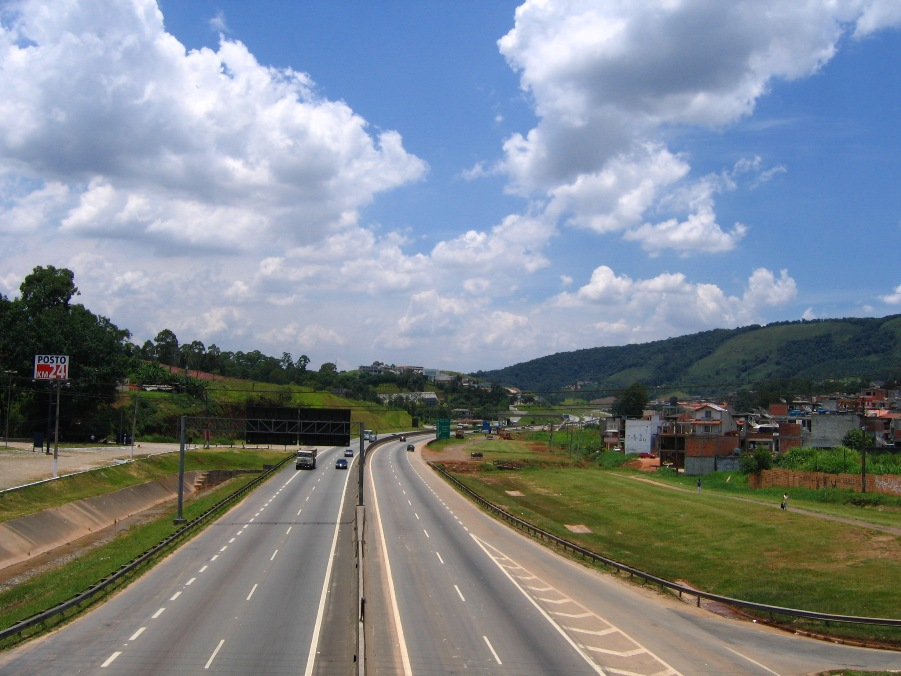

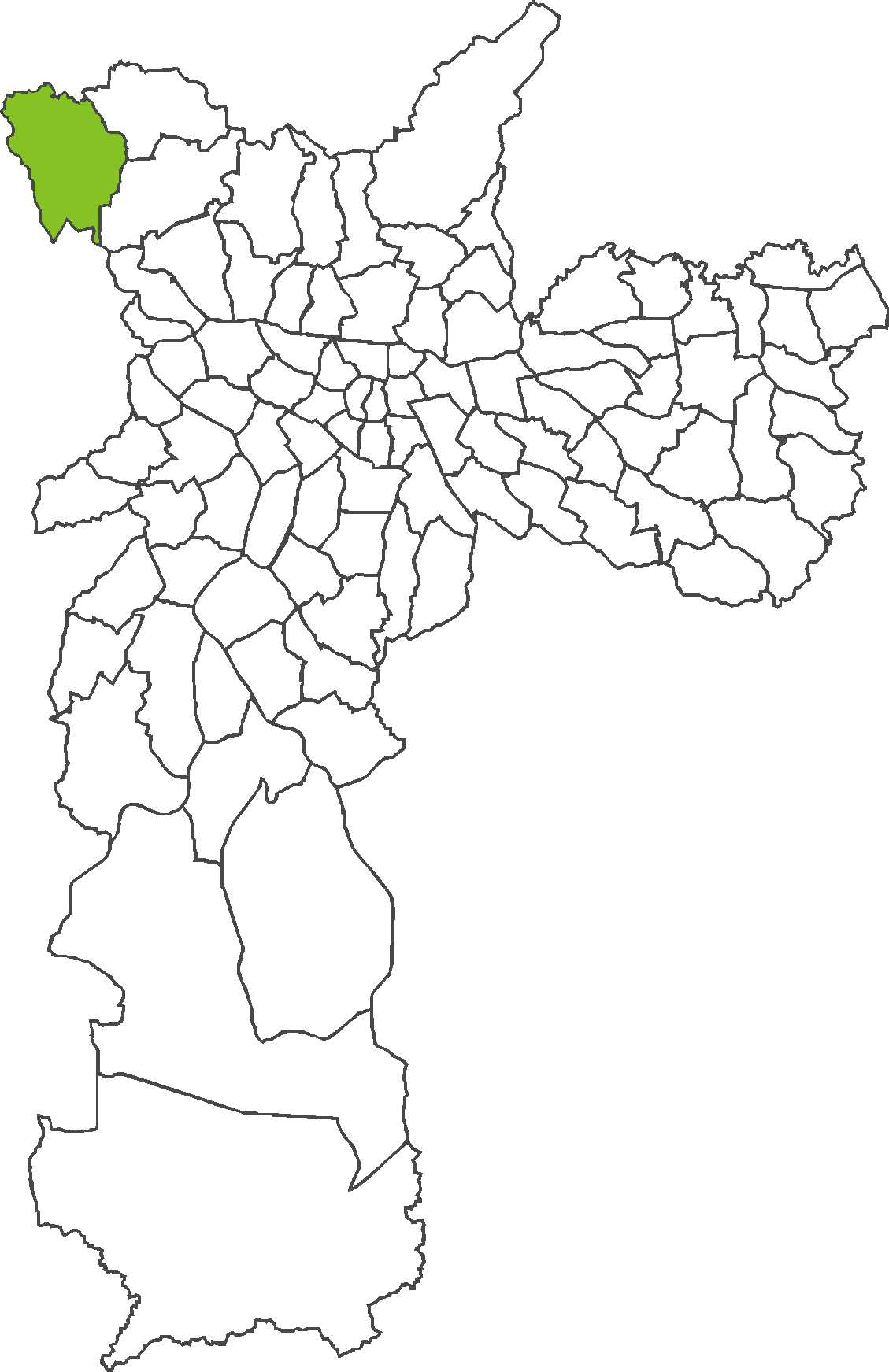
- Location in the city of São Paulo
- Coordinates: 23°25′59″S 46°47′37″W
- Country: Brazil
- State: São Paulo
- Region: Southeast
- City: São Paulo
- Administrative Zone: Northwest
- Subprefecture: Perus
- Bairros: List: Jardim Anhangüera; Jardim Britânia; Jardim Clei; Jardim Escócia; Jardim Jaraguá; Morro Doce; Vila Chica Luísa; Vila Jaraguá

Area
  - Total: 33.44 km^{2} (12.91 sq mi)

Population (2008)
  - Total: 58,708
  - Density: 1,755.39/km^{2} (4,546.4/sq mi)

Anhanguera (Portuguese pronunciation) is a district within the subprefecture of Perus in São Paulo, Brazil.
