= Perus (district of São Paulo) =

District of São Paulo, Brazil

Coordinates: 23.4044°S 46.7555°W

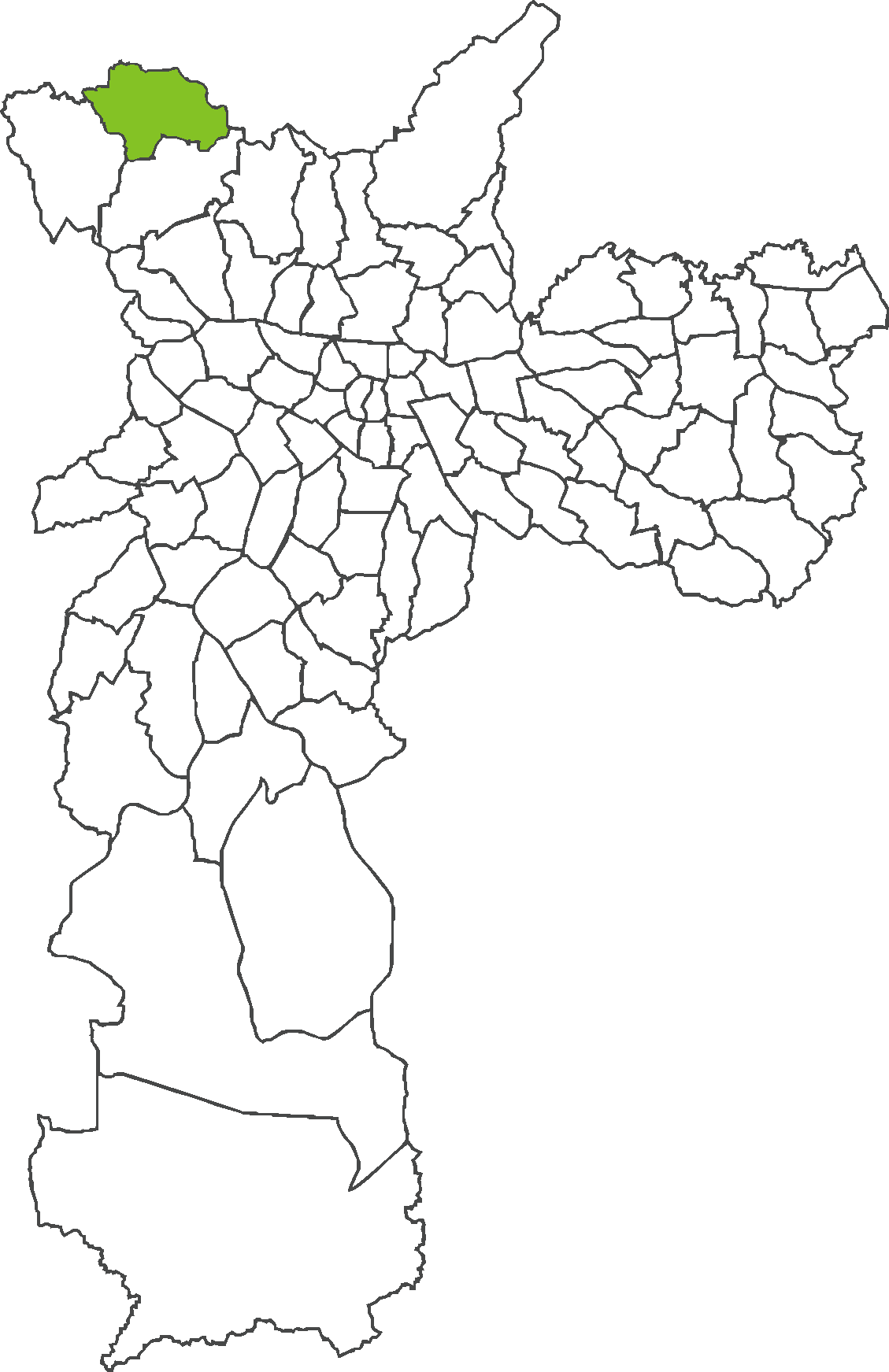
- District of the city of São Paulo
- Country: Brazil
- State: São Paulo
- Municipality: São Paulo
- Subprefecture: Perus

Area
  - Total: 23.90 km^{2} (9.23 sq mi)

Population (2010)
  - Total: 80,187
  - Density: 3,355/km^{2} (8,690/sq mi)
- Website: Subprefecture of Perus

Perus is one of 96 districts in the city of São Paulo, Brazil. The Perus-Pirapora Railway passes there.
