= Rodovia Washington Luís =

Highway in São Paulo, Brazil

SP-310
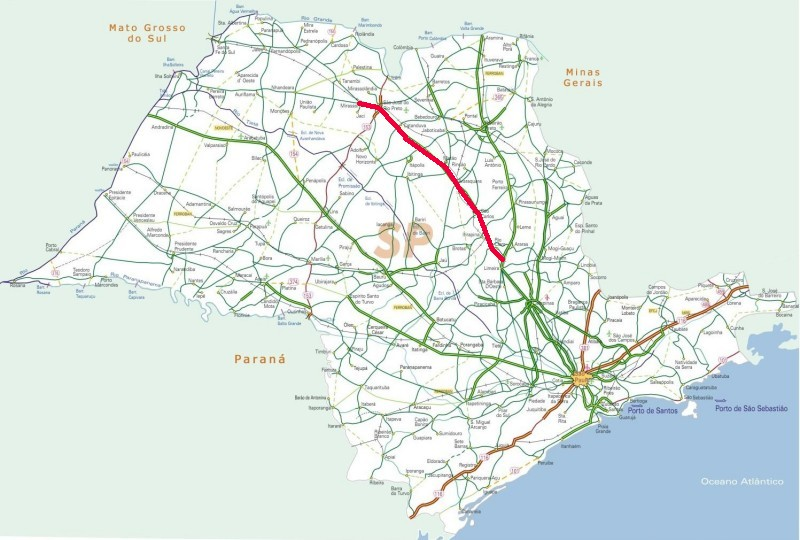
- Native name: Rodovia Washington Luís (Portuguese)
- Type: From Limeira to Rio Claro four-lane highway, from Rio Claro to São Carlos four and five lane highway, from São Carlos to São José do Rio Preto four and five lane highway.
- Length: 301 km (187 mi)
- Location: Passes through Limeira, Cordeirópolis, Santa Gertrudes, Rio Claro, Corumbataí, São Carlos, Ibaté, Araraquara, Matão, Taquaritinga, Catanduva, Catiguá, Ibirá, Uchoa, Cedral, São José do Rio Preto
- South end: Rodovia Anhanguera, km 153, in the city of Limeira
- Major junctions: SP 330 (Rodovia Anhanguera), km 153; SP 348 (Rodovia dos Bandeirantes), km 156; SP 225 (Rodovia Eng° Paulo Nilo Romano) and (Rodovia Deputado Rogê Ferreira), km 206; SP 215 (Rodovia Dr. Paulo Lauro e Dep. Vicente Botta and Rodovia Luís Augusto de Oliveira), km 227; SP 318 (Rodovia Thales de Lorena Peixoto Junior), 235,4; SP 255 (Rodovia Antônio Machado Sant'Anna) and (Rodovia Comendador João Ribeiro de Barros), km 271; SP 326 (Rodovia Brigadeiro Faria Lima), km 293; SP 319 (Rodovia Thyrso Micali), km 321; SP 425/BR 153 (Rodovia Transbrasiliana), km 439
- North end: Rodovia Euclides da Cunha, in the city of Mirassol

Construction
- Inauguration: 1953/1959/1961

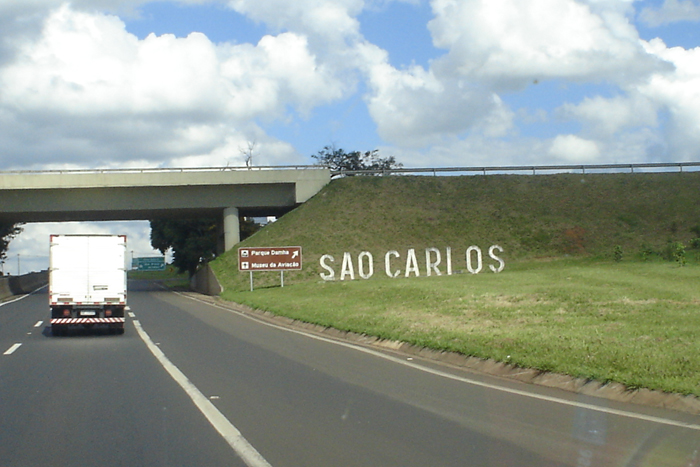
Highway (exit to city of São Carlos), km 236 south way

Rodovia Washington Luís (official designation SP-310) is a highway in the state of São Paulo, Brazil.

It runs in the North-Northwest direction, departing as a branch from the Anhangüera Highway near the city of Limeira. It also crosses with the Rodovia dos Bandeirantes, nearby the city of Cordeirópolis.

Main cities linked by the Washington Luís Highway are Rio Claro, São Carlos, Araraquara, Matão, Catanduva, São José do Rio Preto and Mirassol.

It is named in honor of Washington Luís (1869–1957), one of the presidents of Brazil and a paulista, who famously declared in 1926 that "to govern is to build roads".

The highway is managed and maintained through a state concession to the private companies Centrovias and Triângulo do Sol, and therefore is a toll road.

From Mirassol to Ilha Solteira, the name is changed to "Feliciano Sales Cunha", keeping the SP-310 code.

There is another highway so named in Brazil, in the state of Rio de Janeiro, between Rio de Janeiro and Petrópolis.

== Highway description ==
- km 153 - The highway start at Rodovia Anhangüera
- km 153 - The start of administration Centrovias
- km 155 - Weighing scale (north and south way)
- km 156 - Exit to Rodovia dos Bandeirantes
- km 159 - Exit to Cordeirópolis
- km 161 - Speedtrap (north way)
- km 165 - Exit to Santa Gertrudes
- km 173 - Highway Police
- km 173 - Exit to Rio Claro
- km 173 - Exit to Piracicaba (36 km)
- km 173,840 - Speedtrap (north way)
- km 175,345 - Speedtrap (south way)
- km 180 - Exit to São Pedro (51 km)
- km 181 - Toll road Rio Claro (south way)
- km 182 - Speedtrap (south way)
- km 184,396 - Speedtrap (south way)
- km 184,400 - SAU (south way) Rio Claro
- km 194,600 - Speedtrap (south way)
- km 198 - Highway Police
- km 199 - Exit to Corumbataí
- km 199,900 - Speedtrap (south way)
- km 200,150 - Weighing scale
- km 200,150 - SAU (north way) Corumbataí
- km 201,200 - Weighing scale (south way)
- km 205,850 - Speedtrap (north way)
- km 207 - Exit to (SP-225) by Analândia (16 km), Pirassununga (41 km)
- km 207 - Exit to (SP-225) by Itirapina, Represa do Broa, Brotas (34 km), Jaú (85 km) and Bauru
- km 209 - Weighing scale (north way)
- km 214,100 - Weighing scale (south way)
- km 217 - Toll road Itirapina / São Carlos (north way)
- km 217,080 - SAU (south way) Itirapina
- km 220 - Northbound - Graal Rubi Road Services
- km 222 - Southbound - Castelo Road Services Plaza
- km 222 - Southbound - Hotel Pousadas Conde do Pinhal
- km 225,060 - Speedtrap (north way)
- km 227,800 - The end of administration Centrovias
- km 227,800 - The start of administration Triângulo do Sol
- km 227,900 - Exit to São Carlos by (SP-215)
- km 227.900 - Exit to Volkswagen engines
- km 227,900 - Exit to (SP-215) by Ribeirão Bonito (33 km), Dourado, São Paulo (50 km), Jaú (85 km) and Bauru
- km 227,900 - Exit to (SP-215) by Descalvado (35 km) and Porto Ferreira (48 km)
- km 228,600 - Exit to São Carlos (Getúlio Vargas avenue)
- km 231 - Exit to São Carlos
- km 231 - Exit to FADISC
- km 231 - Exit to Jardim Tangará and others
- km 231,750 - Exit to São Carlos
- km 231,750 - Exit to Jardim Maria Stella Fagá and others
- km 231,750 - Exit to Estrada da Babilônia (SCA-334)
- km 232 - Exit to São Carlos
- km 232 - Exit to Vila Santa Maria I, II and São Carlos VIII
- km 232 - Exit to São Carlos (Vila Nery)
- km 233,700 - Highway Police
- km 234 - Exit to São Carlos (Araraquara avenue)
- km 234,200 - Footbridge
- km 235 - Exit to UFSCar
- km 235 - Exit to São Carlos
- km 235,500 - Speedtrap (north way)
- km 235,400 - Exit to (SP-318) São Carlos Airport, TAM Museum and Technology Center of TAM (14 km)
- km 235,400 - Exit to (SP-318) Damha Golf Club (2 km) and Ribeirão Preto (91 km)
- km 235,800 - Exit to São Carlos (Luís Augusto de Oliveira avenue)
- km 236,300 - Southbound - Esplanada Road Services
- km 236,500 - Exit to Tecumseh do Brasil
- km 236,500 - Exit to São Carlos
- km 236,750 - Footbridge
- km 238 - Southbound - Graal São Carlos Road Services
- km 240 - Exit to São Carlos
- km 240 - Exit to UNICEP, USP II and Makro
- km 247 - Exit to Ibaté
- km 253,100 - SAU (north way) Ibaté
- km 260,150 - Speedtrap (south way)
- km 268 - Exit to Araraquara
- km 268 - Exit to Ribeirão Preto (83 km)
- km 268 - Exit to Jaú (66 km), and Barra Bonita (86 km)
- km 271,300 - Speedtrap (north way)
- km 273 - Highway Police
- km 273,900 - Exit to Araraquara
- km 282 - Toll road Araraquara
- km 282,400 - SAU (south way) Araraquara
- km 287 - Exit to Ibitinga
- km 291 - Break area (north way)
- km 291,800 - Speedtrap (north way)
- km 292 - Exit to Rodovia Brigadeiro Faria Lima (SP-326) for Matão, Bebedouro (83 km), and Barretos (130 km)
- km 301 - Exit to Matão
- km 315 - Exit to Jaboticabal (41 km)
- km 325 - SAU (north way) Taquaritinga
- km 329 - Exit to Taquaritinga (SP-333)
- km 330 - Exit to Itápolis (24 km), Borborema (50 km)
- km 341 - Exit to Cândido Rodrigues (11 km)
- km 348 - Toll road
- km 351 - Exit to Agulha and Botelho
- km 353 - Exit to Uraí
- km 364 - Exit to Santa Adélia
- km 376 - Exit to Pindorama and Roberto (8 km)
- km 382 - Highway Police
- km 382 - Exit to Catanduva
- km 382 - Exit to Novo Horizonte (50 km)
- km 384 - Exit to Bebedouro (73 km) and Urupês (32 km)
- km 384 - SAU (south way) Catanduva
- km 394 - Exit to Catiguá and Olímpia (43 km)
- km 394,900 - Speedtrap (north way)
- km 398 - Toll road
- km 398,500 - SAU (north way) Catiguá
- km 402 - Exit to Ibirá
- km 412 - Exit to Uchoa
- km 425 - Highway Police
- km 425 - Exit to Cedral and Potirendaba (17 km)
- km 430 - Exit to Engenheiro Schmidt
- km 436 - Exit to Barretos (98 km) and Lins (118 km)
- km 437 - Speedtrap (south way)
- km 439 - Exit to São José do Rio Preto and Ilha Solteira (227 km)
- km 443 - SAU (south way) São José do Rio Preto
- km 444 - Footbridge
- km 444,400 - Speedtrap (south way)
- km 452 - Speedtrap (north way)
- km 454,300 - The end of administration Triângulo do Sol

== See also ==
- Highway system of São Paulo
- Brazilian Highway System
