= Mesoregion of Araraquara =

- Mesoregion
- Location of the Mesoregion of Araraquara
- Coordinates: 21°47′38″S 48°10′33″W
- Country: Brazil
- Region: Southeast
- State: São Paulo

Area
  - Total: 9,451.2 km^{2} (3,649.1 sq mi)

Population (2010/IBGE)
  - Total: 810,926
  - Density: 85.8/km^{2} (222/sq mi)
- Time zone: UTC-3 (UTC-3)
  - Summer (DST): UTC-2 (UTC-2)
- Area code: +55 16

The Mesoregion of Araraquara is one of the 15 mesoregions of the São Paulo state, Brazil. It is located on the center of the state, and has an area of 9,451.2 km^{2} (3,649.1 sq mi).

The population of the mesoregion is 810,926 inhabitants (IBGE/2010), spread over 21 municipalities.

== Municipalities ==
All data from IBGE/2010

=== Microregion of Araraquara ===
- Population: 502,149
- Area (km^{2}): 6,265.8
- Population density (km^{2}): 80.14

Américo Brasiliense, Araraquara, Boa Esperança do Sul, Borborema, Dobrada, Gavião Peixoto, Ibitinga, Itápolis, Matão, Motuca, Nova Europa, Rincão, Santa Lúcia, Tabatinga, Trabiju

=== Microregion of São Carlos ===
- Population: 308,777
- Area (km^{2}): 3,185.4
- Population density (km^{2}): 96.94

Analândia, Descalvado, Dourado, Ibaté, Ribeirão Bonito, São Carlos

== See also ==
- Interior of São Paulo
