= Microregion of São Carlos =

- Microregion
- Location of the Microregion of São Carlos
- Coordinates: 22°01′04″S 47°53′27″W
- Country: Brazil
- Region: Southeast
- State: São Paulo
- Mesoregion: Araraquara

Area
  - Total: 3,185.4 km^{2} (1,229.9 sq mi)

Population (2010/IBGE)
  - Total: 308,777
  - Density: 96.935/km^{2} (251.06/sq mi)
- Time zone: UTC-3 (UTC-3)
  - Summer (DST): UTC-2 (UTC-2)
- Postal Code: 14000-000
- Area code: +55 16

The Microregion of São Carlos (Portuguese: Microrregião de São Carlos) is a microregion located on the east-center of São Paulo state, Brazil, and is made up of 6 municipalities. It belongs to the Mesoregion of Araraquara.

The population of the Microregion is 308,777 inhabitants, in an area of 3,185.4 km^{2}

== Municipalities ==
The microregion consists of the following municipalities, listed below with their 2010 Census populations (IBGE/2010):

- Analândia: 4,293
- Descalvado: 31,056
- Dourado: 8,609
- Ibaté: 30,734
- Ribeirão Bonito: 12,135
- São Carlos: 221,950

== See also ==
- Interior of São Paulo
