= Sérgio da Rocha =

Brazilian prelate of the Catholic Church (born 1959)

His Eminence Sérgio da Rocha
- Cardinal; Archbishop of São Salvador da Bahia; Primate of Brazil
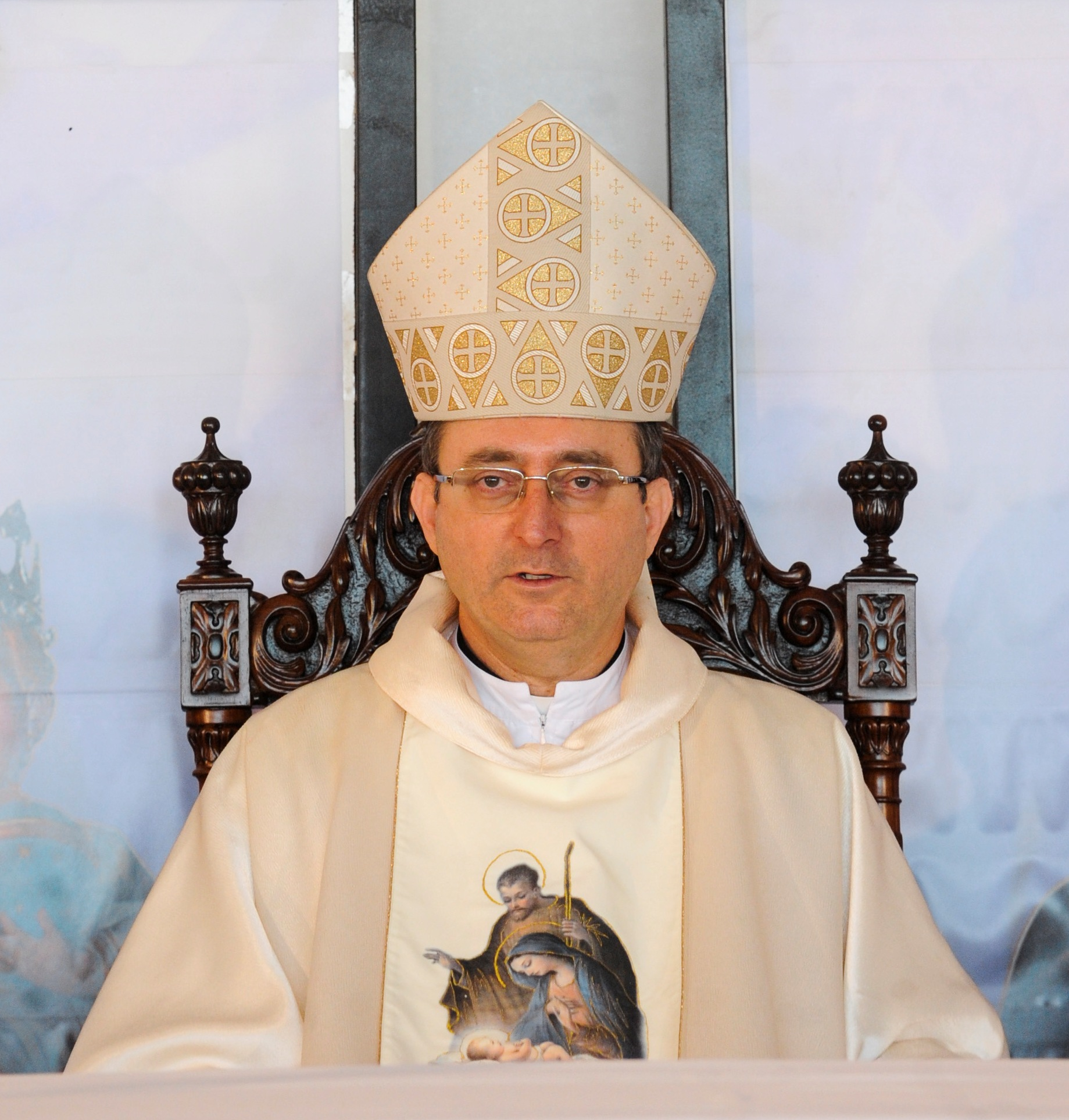
- Rocha in 2011
- Church: Roman Catholic Church
- Archdiocese: São Salvador da Bahia
- See: São Salvador da Bahia
- Appointed: 11 March 2020
- Predecessor: Murilo Ramos Krieger
- Other post: Cardinal-Priest of Santa Croce in Via Flaminia (2016–)
- Previous posts: Auxiliary Bishop of Fortaleza (2001–07); Titular Bishop of Alba (2001–07); Coadjutor Archbishop of Teresina (2007–08); Archbishop of Teresina (2008–11); Archbishop of Brasília (2011–20)

Orders
- Ordination: 14 December 1984 by Constantino Amstalden
- Consecration: 11 August 2001 by José Antônio Aparecido Tosi Marques
- Created cardinal: 19 November 2016 by Pope Francis
- Rank: Cardinal-Priest

Personal details
- Born: 21 October 1959 (age 67) Dobrada, São Paulo, Brazil
- Education: Alphonsian Academy
- Motto: Omnia in Caritate (All in Love)
- Coat of arms: Sérgio da Rocha's coat of arms

Styles of Sergio da Rocha
- Reference style: His Eminence
- Spoken style: Your Eminence
- Informal style: Cardinal

Ordination history of Sérgio da Rocha
History
Episcopal consecration
- Principal consecrator: José Antônio Aparecido Tosi Marques
- Co-consecrators: Joviano de Lima Junior, SSS; Bruno Gamberini
Cardinalate
- Elevated by: Pope Francis
Episcopal succession
Bishops consecrated by Sérgio da Rocha as principal consecrator
- Valdir Mamede: 16 March 2013
- José Aparecido Gonçalves de Almeida: 13 July May 2013
- Marcos Antônio Tavoni: 1 March 2014

Sérgio da Rocha (Portuguese pronunciation: [ˈsɛʁʒiu dɐ ˈʁɔʃɐ]; born 21 October 1959) is a Brazilian prelate of the Catholic Church who has been a cardinal since 2016 and the Archbishop of São Salvador da Bahia since 11 March 2020. He has been a bishop since 2001, first as auxiliary bishop of Fortaleza from 2001 to 2007, coadjutor and then archbishop of Teresina from 2007 to 2011, and archbishop of Brasília from 2011 to 2020. He is a member of the Council of Cardinals.

== Biography ==
Rocha was born in Dobrada in the state of São Paulo on 21 October 1959 and grew up in a rural area. After his elementary studies in Matão, he took courses in philosophy at the seminary of the Diocese of São Carlos and theology at the Theological Institute of Campinas. He earned a licentiate in moral theology from the Theological Faculty Nossa Senhora da Assunção in São Paulo, and a doctorate in the same discipline from the Alphonsian Academy, Rome. He was ordained a priest in Matão on 14 December 1984.

He worked as a pastor in the Água Vermelha neighborhood of São Carlos and was coordinator of Youth Ministry of the Diocese of São Carlos in 1985/1986; professor of philosophy at the seminary and spiritual director of the House of Theology in Campinas in 1986/1987 and in 1991; rector of the Philosophy Seminary in 1987–1988 and in 1990; coordinator of Vocational Ministry in 1987 and 1989; vicar of the Cathedral of São Carlos in 1988/1989; vicar of Nossa Senhora de Fátima parish in 1990; coordinator and rector of São Judas Tadeu Chapel in 1991; professor of moral theology at the PUC Campinas and rector of the Diocesan Seminary of Theology from 1997 to 2001. On the diocesan level, he was a member of the training team for permanent deacons, and a member of the Council of Priests and the College of Consultants.

On 13 June 2001, Pope John Paul II appointed him titular bishop of Alba and auxiliary bishop of Fortaleza. He received his episcopal consecration on 11 August. He was appointed coadjutor archbishop of Teresina on 31 January 2007 and he became archbishop there on 3 September 2008.

Pope Benedict XVI named Rocha to succeed João Braz de Aviz as archbishop of Brasilia on 15 June 2011. He took possession of that see on 6 August. In Brasília, he erected 11 new parishes, created new plans for supporting the homeless and young people, reorganized the seminary, and restructured the leadership of the archdiocese.

On 14 November 2015, Pope Francis named him as one of his three appointees to the 15-member council of the Synod of Bishops, following the Synod on the Family which Rocha attended as president of the Brazilian Bishops Conference.

Rocha has been a member of the Commission for Doctrine of the Episcopal Conference of Brazil (CNBB), and a member of its Task Force to Overcome Poverty and Hunger. For the Northeast Regional Conference, he led the Youth and Vocational Ministry, and served as its secretary, a member of its Doctrine Commission, a member of its permanent council, and as its president. For the Latin American Episcopal Council (CELAM) he has led the Vocations and Ministries Department. On 20 April 2015, he was elected to a four-year term as president of the CNBB.

Pope Francis raised him to the rank of cardinal on 19 November 2016, naming him Cardinal-Priest of Santa Croce in Via Flaminia.

In November 2017, Pope Francis appointed Rocha relator general of the October 2018 Synod on Youth and Vocations.

On 11 March 2020, Pope Francis named him archbishop of São Salvador da Bahia.

On 21 May 2021, at the request of local LGBT rights organizations, Rocha celebrated a Mass for murdered members of the LGBT community. In his homily he said:

The Church is called to be a merciful mother; it suffers with the violence perpetrated against the people.... Violence against the LGBTI+ population is a sad signal of a society which is used to constant violations of life, of dignity, of the rights of so many victims of brutal death.

On 7 March 2023, Pope Francis appointed him to the Council of Cardinal Advisors.

He participated as a cardinal elector in the 2025 papal conclave that elected Pope Leo XIV.

Catholic Church titles
Preceded by José Sótero Valero Ruz	— TITULAR — Titular Bishop of Alba; 13 June 2001 – 31 January 2007	Succeeded by Vito Rallo
Preceded by Celso José Pinto da Silva	Archbishop of Teresina; 3 September 2008 – 15 June 2011	Succeeded by Jacinto Furtado de Brito Sobrinho
Preceded by João Braz de Aviz	Archbishop of Brasília; 15 June 2011 – 11 March 2020	Succeeded by Paulo Cezar Costa
Preceded by Raymundo Damasceno Assis	President of the Brazilian Episcopal Conference; 20 April 2015 – 6 May 2019	Succeeded by Walmor Oliveira de Azevedo
Preceded by William Wakefield Baum	Cardinal-Priest of Santa Croce in Via Flaminia; 19 November 2016 –	Incumbent
Preceded by Murilo Sebastião Ramos Krieger	Archbishop of São Salvador da Bahia; 11 March 2020 –	Incumbent
Order of precedence
Preceded by Geraldo Alckmin as Vice President of Brazil	Brazilian order of precedence 3rd in line as Brazilian cardinal	Followed by Foreign ambassadors
