= Corumbataí (disambiguation) =

Corumbataí is a municipality in the state of São Paulo, Brazil.

Corumbataí may also refer to:

- Corumbataí do Sul, Paraná, Brazil
- Corumbataí River (disambiguation)

== See also ==
- Corumbataia, a genus of armored catfishes
