= Corumbataí River =

There are two rivers named Corumbataí River Brazil:

- Corumbataí River (Paraná)
- Corumbataí River (São Paulo)

== See also ==
- Corumbataí (disambiguation)
