= Municipal Chamber of Araraquara =

Municipal Chamber of Araraquara Câmara Municipal de Araraquara

Type
- Type: Unicameral

Leadership
- President: Paulo Landim, PT; January 1, 2023
- Government Leader: Aluisio Braz, MDB
- Opposition Leader: Rafael de Angeli, Republicans

Structure
- Seats: 18
- Political groups: Government (12): MDB (4); PT (4); PP (2); PCdoB (1); PV (1); Opposition (5): Republicanos (2); NOVO (1); PRD (1); Independent (2): PSD (2)

Meeting place
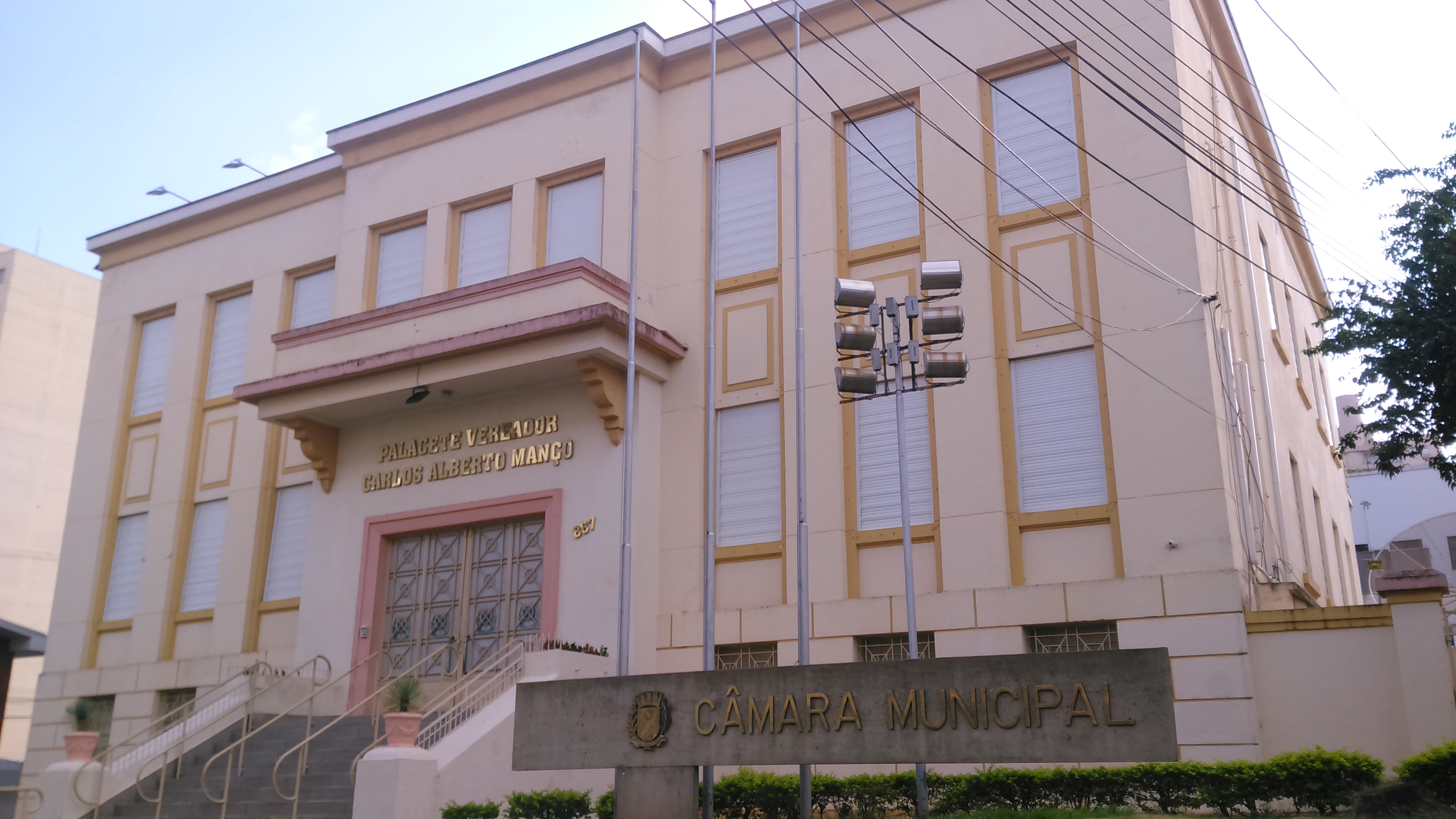
- "Carlos Alberto Manço" Palace

Website
- www.camara-arq.sp.gov.br

The Municipal Chamber of Araraquara is the legislative body of the government of Araraquara in the state of São Paulo in Brazil.

It is unicameral and is composed of 18 councilors.

== History ==
In 1947, the country's first direct elections took place and the citizens of Araraquara elected the first Municipal Chamber through free and universal suffrage. Therefore, the legislature initiated in 1948 is considered the first in the history of Araraquara. Currently, the city is in its 18th legislature, post-Estado Novo.

== Budget ==
Annual budget of the Chamber according to the LOA:

Year	Amount
2010	R$9,080,000.00
2011	R$8,518,200.00
2013	R$13,820,000.00
2014	R$16,100,000.00
2015	R$17,619,400.00
2016	R$18,376,200.00
2018	R$22,633,200.00
2021	R$19,747,980.00

== Councilors of the 17th legislature ==
In the 2016 election carried out on October 2, 355 people ran for 18 seats in the Araraquara City Council.

Of the 18 elected, five were re-elected: Raimundo Bezerra (PRB), Juliana Damus (PP), Edio Lopes (PT), Elias Chediek (MDB) and Jéferson Yashuda (PSDB).

Besides these, four more councilors who acted as alternates were elected: Gerson da Farmácia (MDB), Toninho do Mel (PT), Porsani (PSDB) and Lieutenant Santana (MDB).

== List of presidents ==
1. José Clozel 1948/1949
2. Jose do Amaral Velosa 1950/1952/1954
3. Jorge Borges Correa 1951
4. Mario Ananias 1953/1958
5. Otto Ernani Muller 1955
6. Pedro Marão 1956/1957/1959
7. José Galli 1960/1963
8. Hermínio Pagotto 1961
9. José Mussi 1962
10. João Vergara Gonzalez 1964
11. Álvaro Waldemar Colino 1965/1968
12. Flávio Ferraz de Carvalho 1966/2000
13. Wilmo Gonçalves 1967
14. Miguel Tedde Neto 1969
15. Jose Alberto Gonçalves “Gaeta” 1970/1971/1999
16. Rubens Bellardi Ferreira 1972/1975/1976
17. Arnaldo Izique Caramurú 1973-1974
18. Gildo Merlos 1977/1978/1987/1988/1989/1990/1995/1996
19. Manoel Marques de Jesus 1979-1980
20. Geraldo Polezze 1981-1982
21. José Roberto Cardozo 1983-1984
22. Tadeu José Alves 1985-1986
23. Omar de Souza e Silva 1991-1992 e 1993-1994
24. Valderico Joe 1997-1998 e 2001-2002
25. Eduardo Lauand 2003-2004
26. Ronaldo Napeloso 2005-2006 e 2009-2010
27. Carlos Alberto Manço 2007
28. Edna Martins 2007-2008
29. Aluisio Braz 2011-2012 e 2021-2022
30. João Farias 2013-2014
31. Elias Chediek 2015-2016
32. Jéferson Yashuda 2017-2018
33. Tenente Santana 2019–2020
