= Santa Croce in Via Flaminia =

Roman Catholic basilica, a landmark of Rome, Italy

- Church of the Holy Cross on the Flaminian Way (in English); Sancti Crucis in via Flaminia (in Latin)
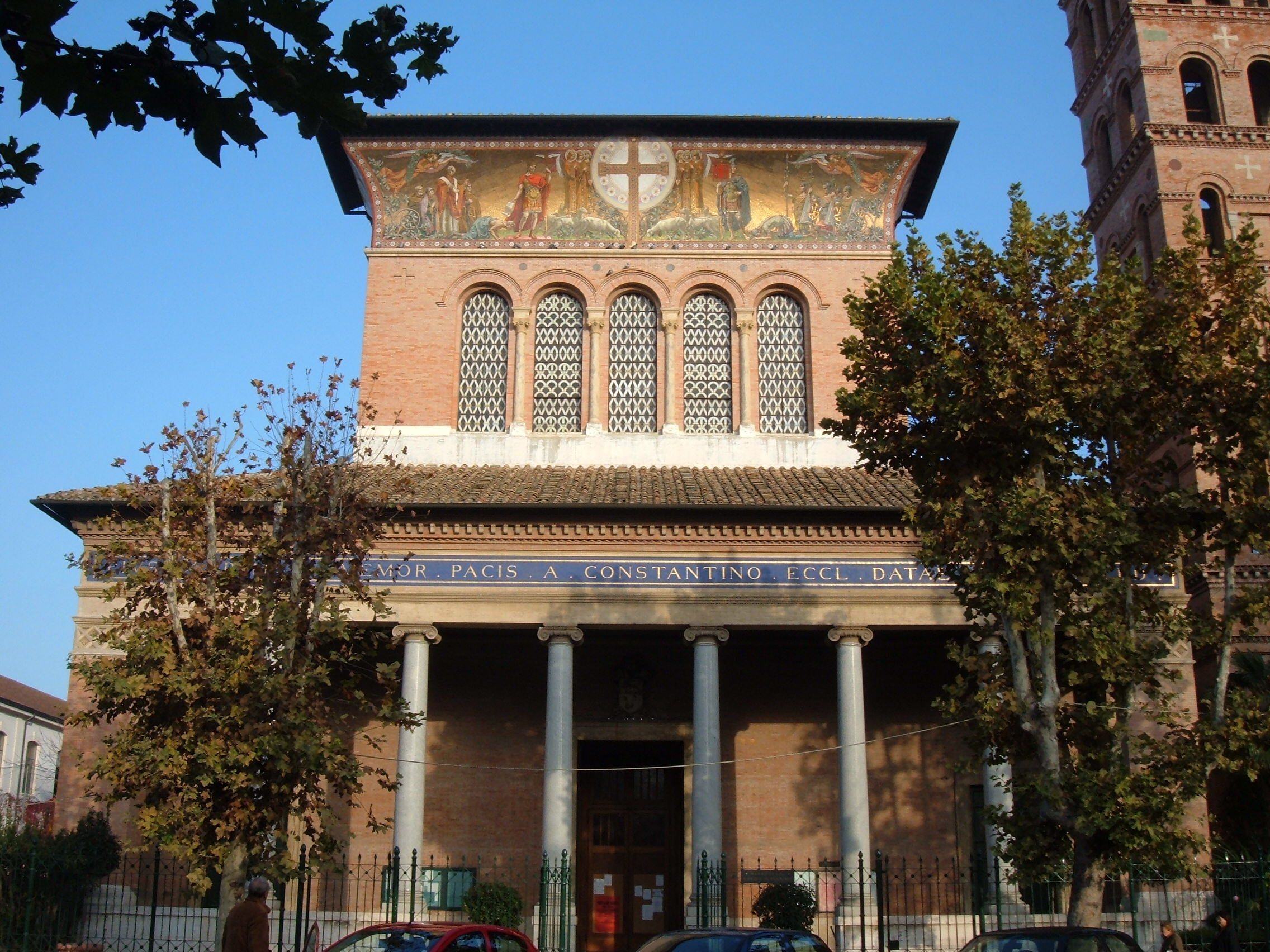
- Santa Croce in Via Flaminia
- Click on the map for a fullscreen view
- 41°55′43″N 12°28′04″E
- Location: Via Guido Reni 2, Rome
- Country: Italy
- Denomination: Roman Catholic
- Tradition: Roman Rite

History
- Status: Titular church, basilica
- Dedication: Holy Cross
- Consecrated: 1918

Architecture
- Architect: Aristide Leonori
- Architectural type: Church
- Groundbreaking: 1913
- Completed: 1914

Administration
- District: Lazio
- Province: Diocese of Rome

Santa Croce in Via Flaminia is a basilica church dedicated to the Holy Cross on the Via Flaminia in Rome, Italy. Sacred Military Constantinian Order of Saint-George has its seat there.

== History ==
It was first built in 1913 by the architect Aristide Leonori for Pope Pius X, in celebration of the 1600th anniversary of the Edict of Milan. In the style of a Roman basilica, it has a mosaic-decorated facade, a portico with six Ionic columns and a mosaic by Biagio Biagetti, a five-storey bell tower and a three-aisled nave divided by six columns of Bavarian granite on each side.

It was opened for worship on 12 July 1914, and granted to the Congregation of the Sacred Stigmata (Stigmatines), but was not consecrated until 1918 (by Giuseppe Pallica, Titular Archbishop of Philippi).

In 1954, Pope Pius XII made it an alternative station church for Friday of the Fifth Week of Lent. Pope Paul VI elevated it to the status of Minor Basilica in 1964.

== Titular Church ==
The Church of S. Croce was made a titular church for a Cardinal Priest by Pope Paul VI on 5 February 1965, an anticipation of a need for extra titles for new cardinals. On 22 February 1965 he created twenty-seven new Cardinals.

- Josef Beran, Archbishop of Prague (25 Feb 1965 — 17 May 1969)
- Bolesław Kominek, archbishop of Wrocław (5 Mar 1973 — 10 Mar 1974)
- William Wakefield Baum, Archbishop of Washington DC (24 May 1976 — 23 Jul 2015)
- Sergio da Rocha, Archbishop of Brasilia (19 November 2016 – present)

The position of titular priest of the church is Sergio da Rocha since 19 November 2016.

Preceded by San Crisogono, Rome	Landmarks of Rome; Santa Croce in Via Flaminia	Succeeded by Santa Croce in Gerusalemme
