= Descalvado =

Municipality in the state of São Paulo in Brazil

- Municipality
- Municipality of Descalvado
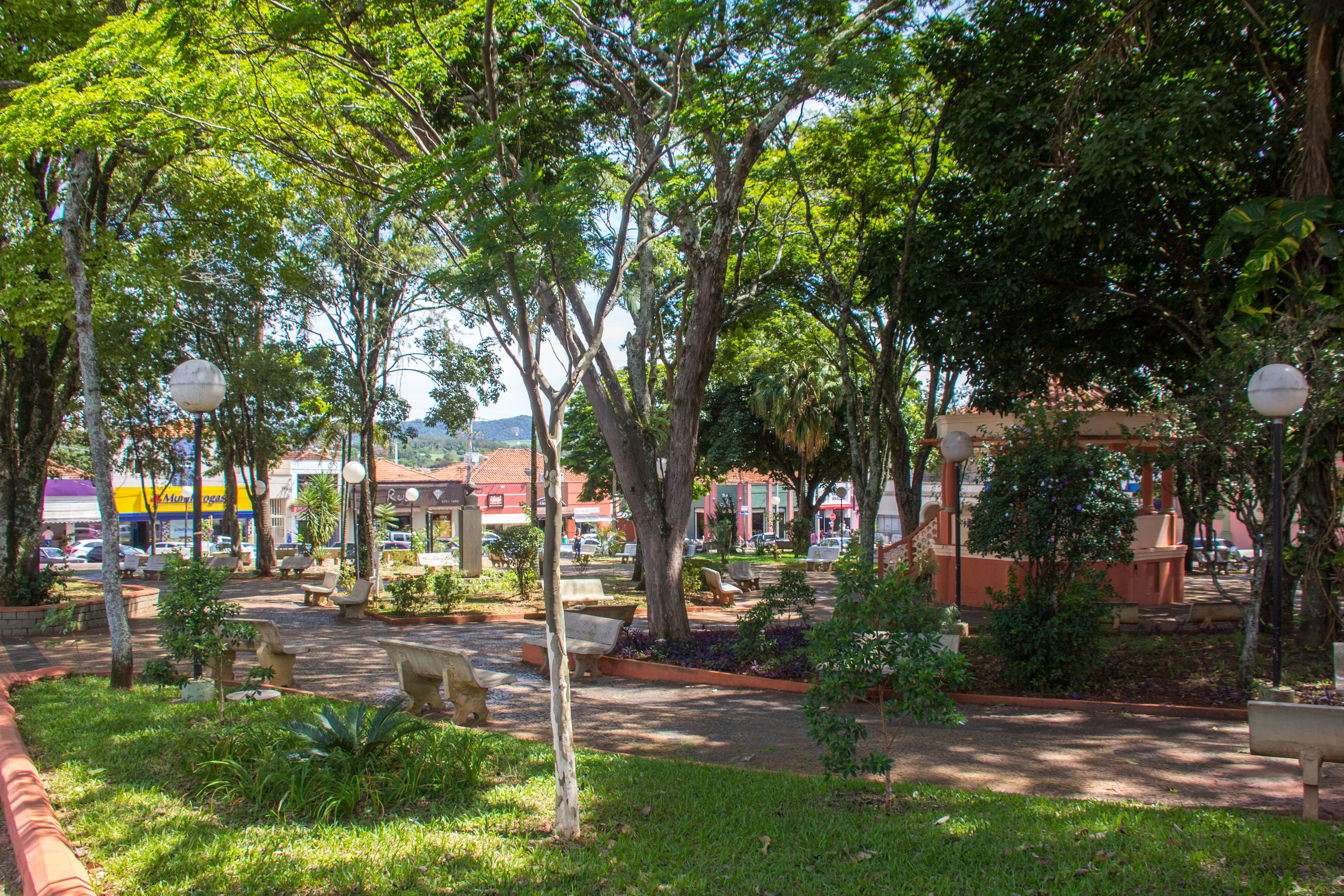
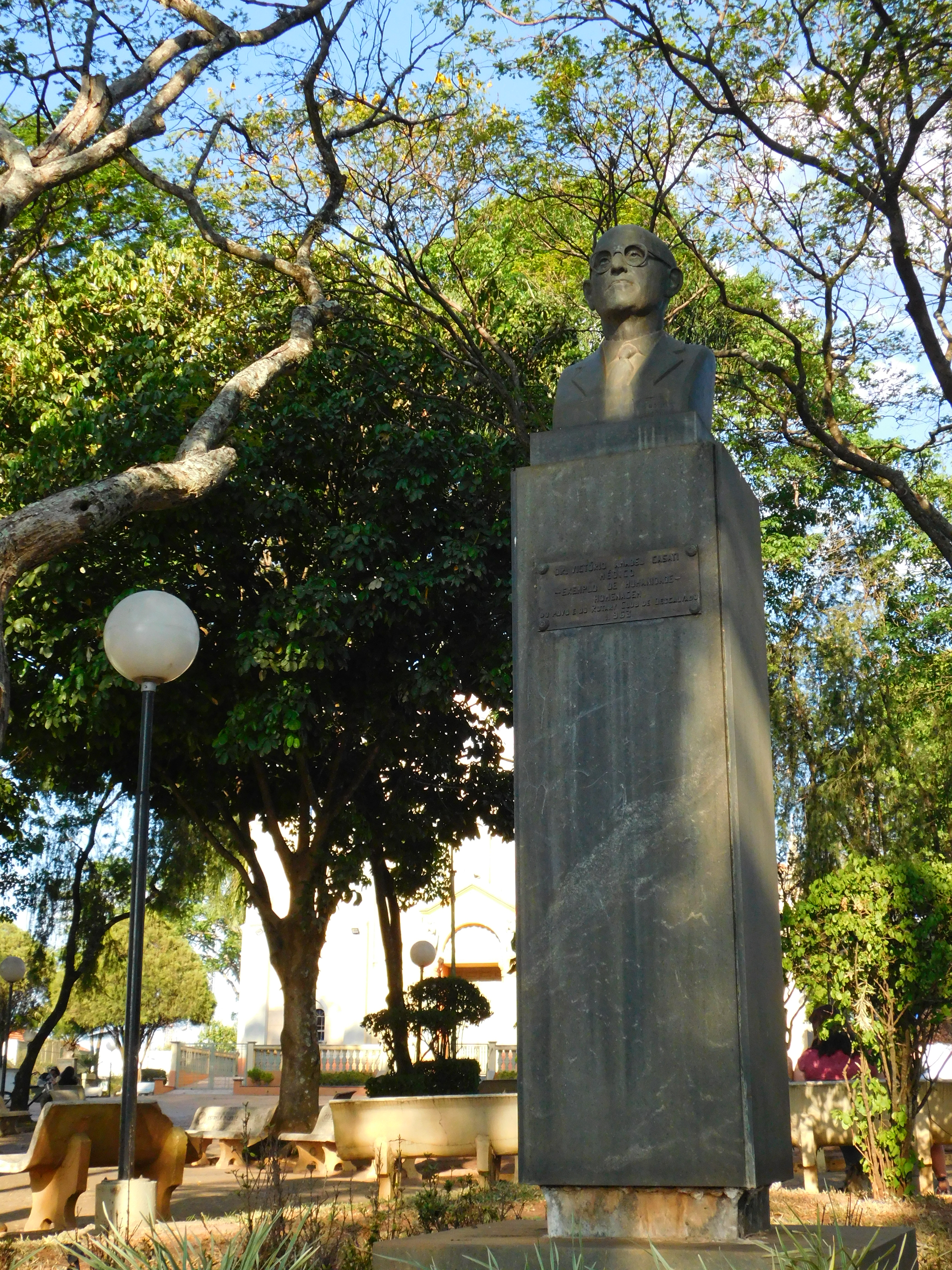
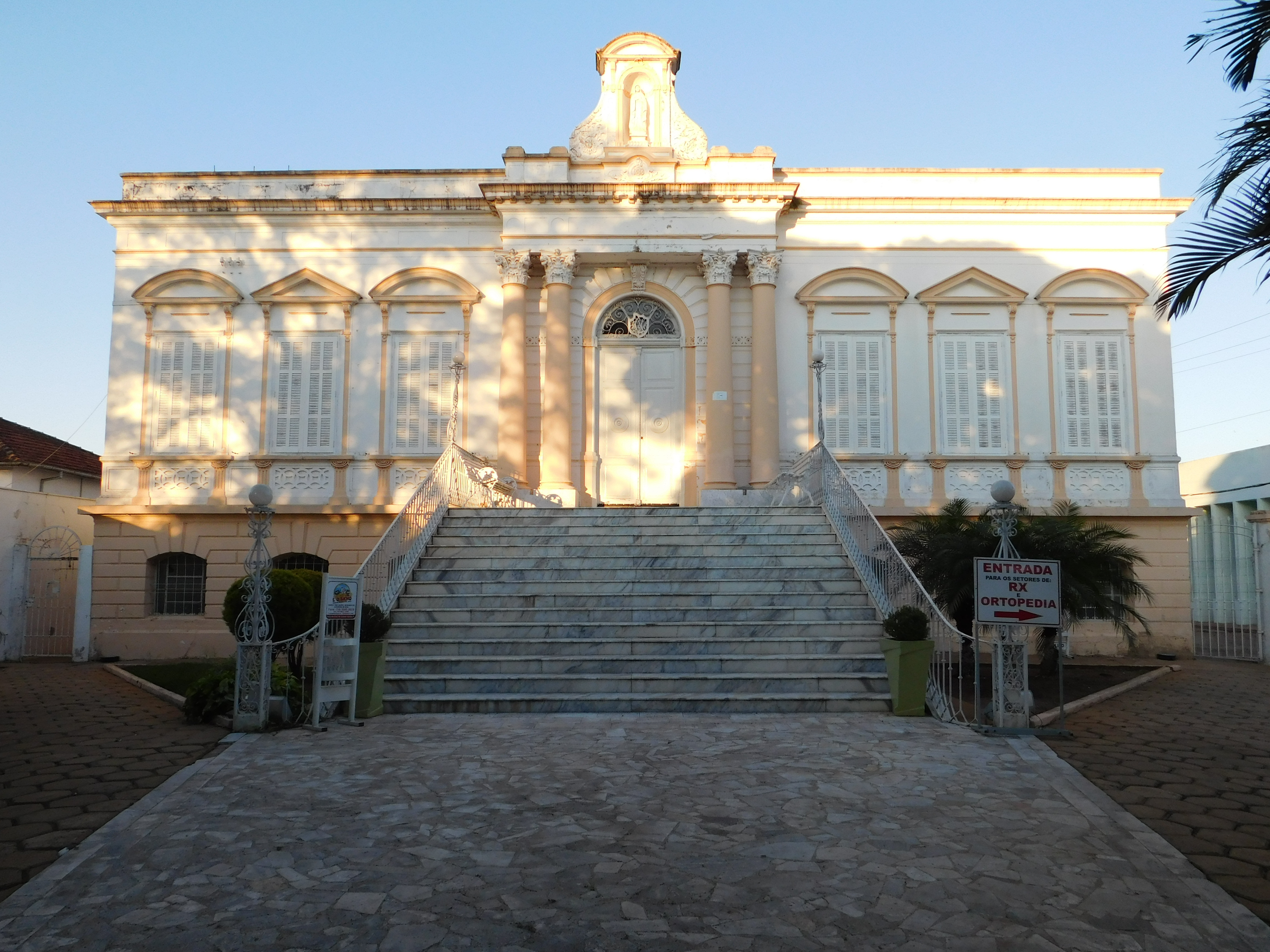
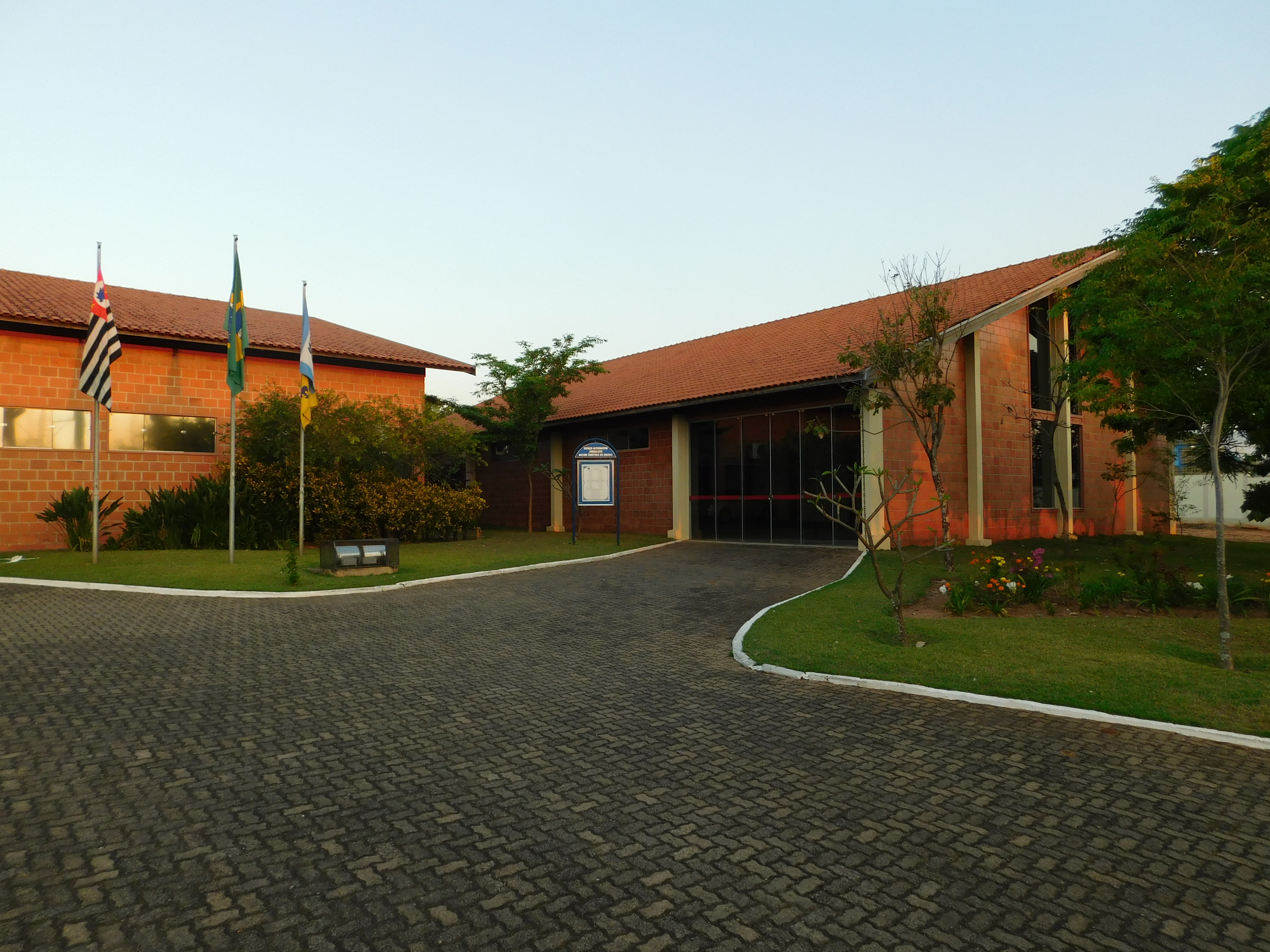
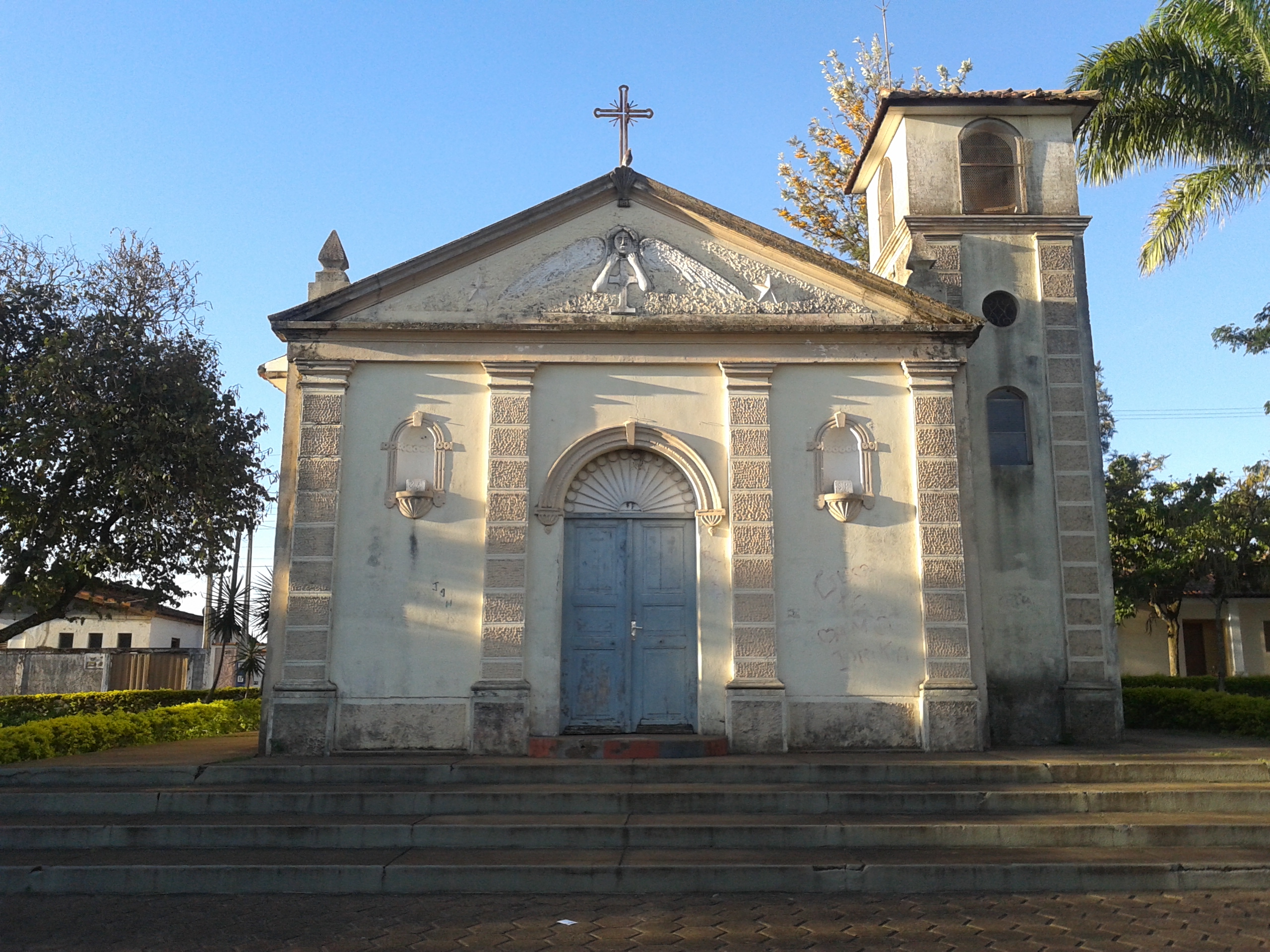
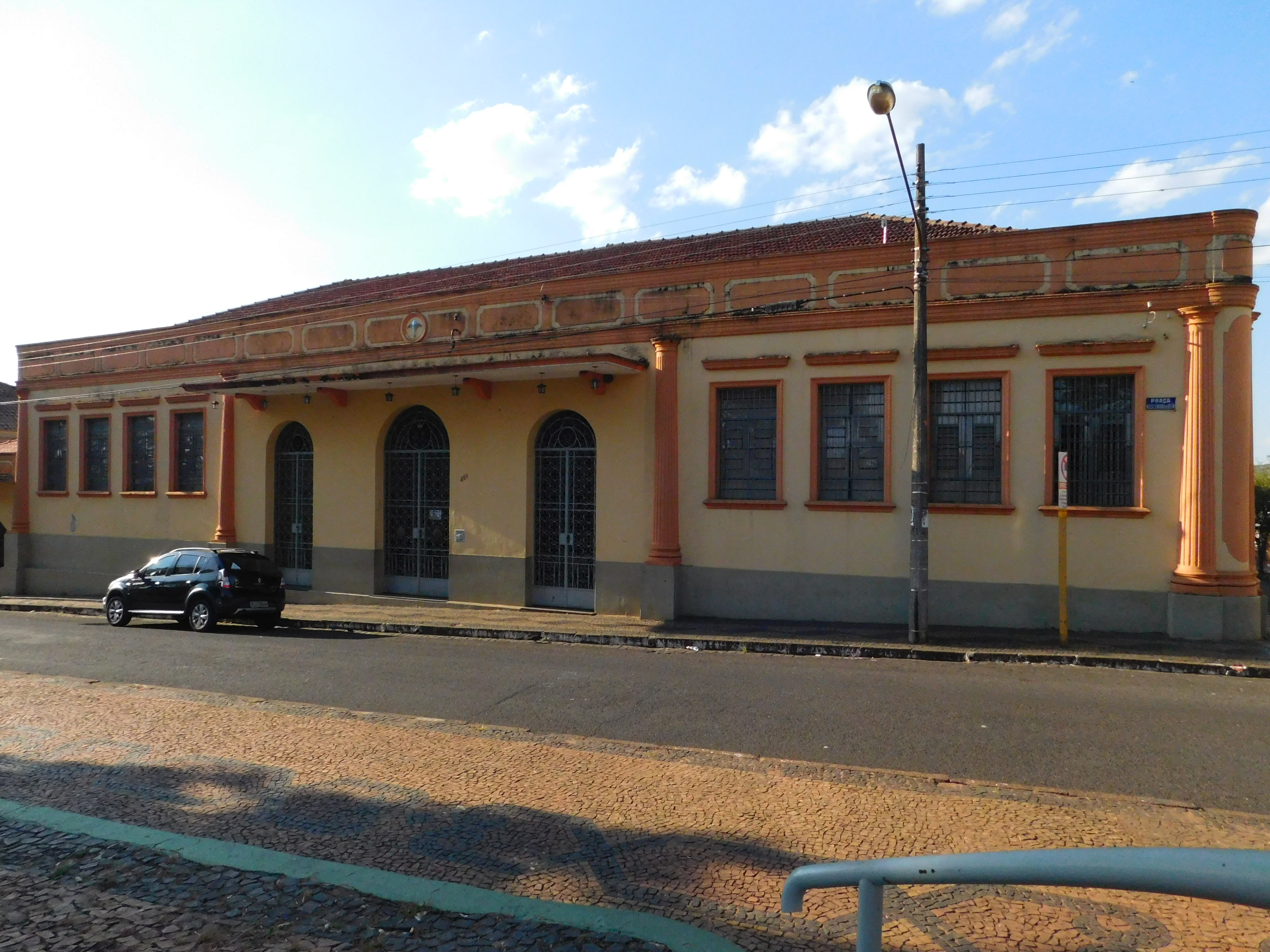

- Flag Coat of arms

- Location in São Paulo

- Location in Brazil
- Coordinates: 21°54′14″S 47°36′10″W
- Country: Brazil
- Region: Southeast
- State: São Paulo
- Mesoregion: Araraquara
- Microregion: São Carlos

Area
  - Total: 753.7 km^{2} (291.0 sq mi)
- Elevation: 679 m (2,228 ft)

Population (2020)
  - Total: 33,910
  - Density: 44.99/km^{2} (116.5/sq mi)
- Time zone: UTC−3 (BRT)
- Postal code: 13690-000
- Area code: +55 19
- HDI (2010): 0.760 – high
- Website: www.descalvado.sp.gov.br

Descalvado is a municipality in the state of São Paulo, Brazil. The population is 33,910 (2020 est.) in an area of 753.7 km^{2} (291.0 sq mi).

== History ==
The city was founded firstly as a settlement in the 1830s and was one of the main coffee producer in São Paulo's golden coffee plantation years.

== Economy ==
Descalvado's economy is farming based and sugar cane and poultry are its main products.

== Media ==
In telecommunications, the city was served by Telecomunicações de São Paulo. In July 1998, this company was acquired by Telefónica, which adopted the Vivo brand in 2012. The company is currently an operator of cell phones, fixed lines, internet (fiber optics/4G) and television (satellite and cable).

== Religion ==
Christianity is present in the city as follows:

=== Catholic Church ===
The Catholic church in the municipality is part of the Roman Catholic Diocese of Limeira.

=== Protestant Church ===
The most diverse evangelical beliefs are present in the city, mainly Pentecostal, including the Assemblies of God in Brazil (the largest evangelical church in the country), Christian Congregation in Brazil, among others. These denominations are growing more and more throughout Brazil.

== See also ==
- List of municipalities in São Paulo
- Interior of São Paulo
