= Matão =

- Município de Matão
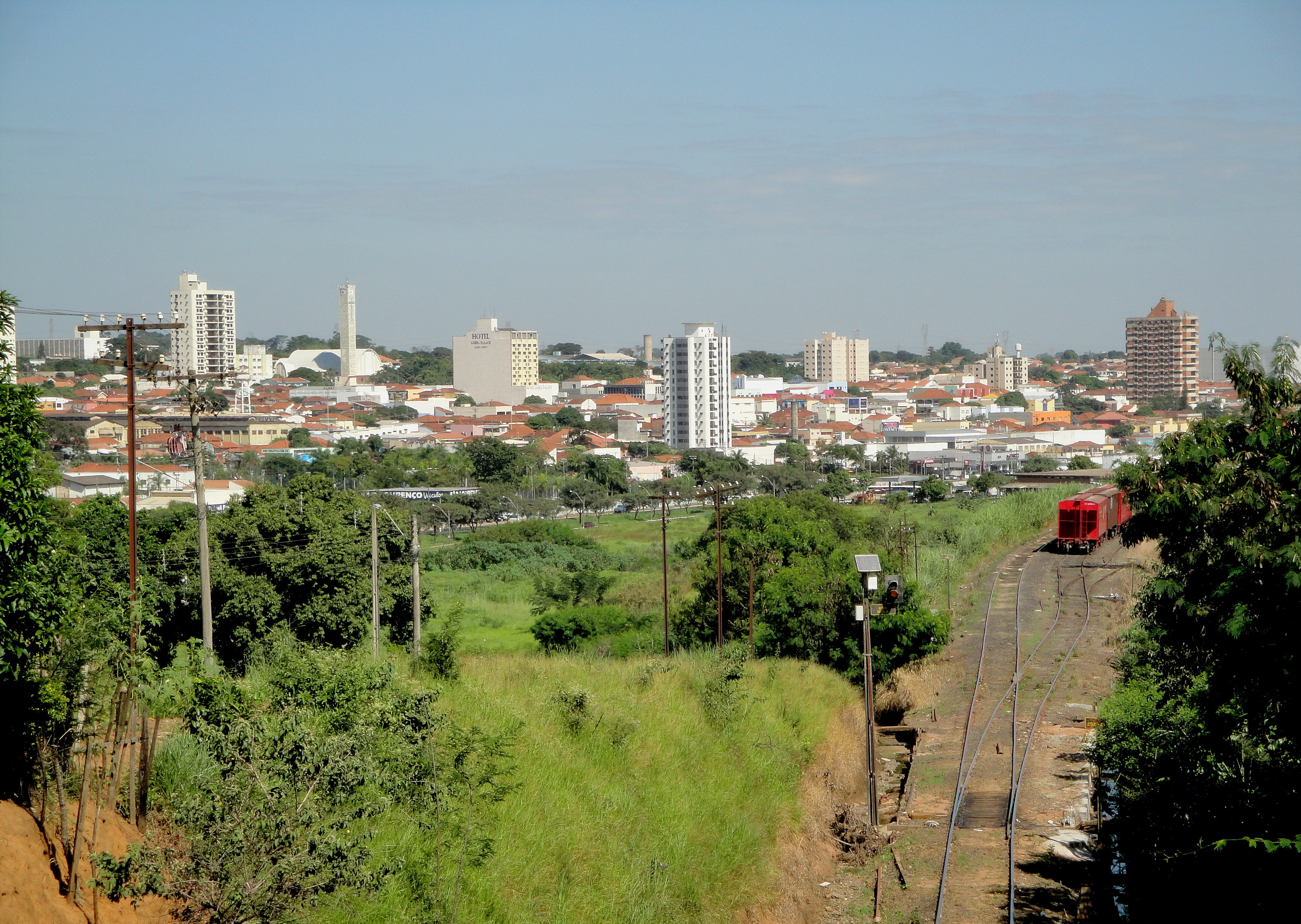

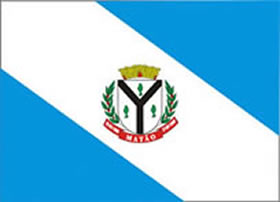
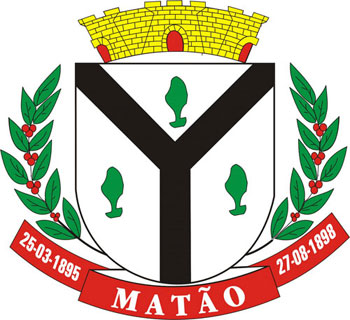
- Flag Coat of arms
- Nicknames: Cidade Canção (City of Song) and Terra de Saudade (Land of Longing)

- Location of Matão in Brazil
- Coordinates: 21°36′10″S 48°21′57″W
- Country: Brazil
- Region: Southeast
- State: São Paulo
- Founded: August 27, 1898

Government
  - Mayor: Chico Dumont (PT) (2013–2016)
- Elevation: 585 m (1,919 ft)

Population (2020)
  - Density: 146.3/km^{2} (379/sq mi)
  - Metro: 83,626
- Time zone: UTC-3 (UTC-3)
  - Summer (DST): UTC-2 (UTC-2)
- CEP (postal code): 15990-240
- HDI (2000): 0.806 –high
- Website: City of Matão

Matão is a municipality in the state of São Paulo in Brazil. As of 2020, the town had an estimated population of 83,626 and a population density of 146.3 persons per km^{2}. The total area the city is 524.899 square kilometres (202.665 mi^{2}). Matão sits at an elevation of 585 metres (1,919 ft). The municipality consists of two districts: Matão and São Lourenço do Turvo.

== History ==
Matão was first populated by coffee growers at the beginning of the 1890s. The settlers constructed a small chapel in 1894, and in 1895 called their settlement Senhor do Bom Jesus das Palmeiras. The settlement was renamed Matão in 1897 and became a district of Araraquara. It became an independent municipality on August 27, 1898. The region attracted more small-scale farmers in the 1890s, and development was furthered by the construction of a railroad line, the Estrada de Ferro Araraquara, which was built to connect Rio Claro, in São Paulo State, to Cuiabá, the capital city of Mato Grosso. The rail line reached Matão by 1899. The municipality comprised three districts, Matão, Dobrada and São Lourenço do Turvo, until 1964 when Dobrada became a separate municipality.

== Demography ==
Historical population (municipality)
Year	Population	%±
1920	22,320
1940	22,907	2.6%
1950	20,551	−10.3%
1960	22,251	8.3%
1970	21,953	−1.3%
1980	38,133	73.7%
1991	63,613	66.8%
2000	71,753	12.8%
2010	76,786	7.0%
2022	79,033	2.9%

== Events ==
=== Corpus Christi (Solemnity of the Body and Blood of Christ) Feast ===
Matão is one of the Brazilian cities renowned for its Corpus Christi festivities, which have been celebrated since 1948. On this day streets of the city are decorated with temporary "rugs" made of crushed colored glass, coffee powder, and other materials in preparation for a religious procession. These rugs feature religious and municipal scenes and colorful floral and geometric designs.

== Media ==
In telecommunications, the city was served by Companhia Telefônica Brasileira until 1973, when it began to be served by Telecomunicações de São Paulo. In July 1998, this company was acquired by Telefónica, which adopted the Vivo brand in 2012.

The company is currently an operator of cell phones, fixed lines, internet (fiber optics/4G) and television (satellite and cable).

== See also ==
- List of municipalities in São Paulo
- Interior of São Paulo
