= SP-225 (São Paulo highway) =

State highway in São Paulo, Brazil

SP-225

Route information
- Length: 341.736 km (212.345 mi)

Location
- Country: Brazil
- State: São Paulo

Highway system
- Highways in Brazil; Federal; São Paulo State Highways

SP-225 is a state highway in the state of São Paulo in Brazil. Part of it consists of the Rodovia Nilo Paulo Romano and Rodovia Dep. Rogê Ferreira.
