= SP-318 (São Paulo highway) =

State highway in São Paulo, Brazil

SP-318

Route information
- Length: 280.000 km (173.984 mi)

Location
- Country: Brazil
- State: São Paulo

Highway system
- Highways in Brazil; Federal; São Paulo State Highways

SP-318 is a state highway in the state of São Paulo in Brazil. Part of it consists of the Rodovia Thales de Lorena Peixoto Júnior.
