= Araraquara =

Municipality in Southeast Brazil

- Municipality
- Municipality of Araraquara
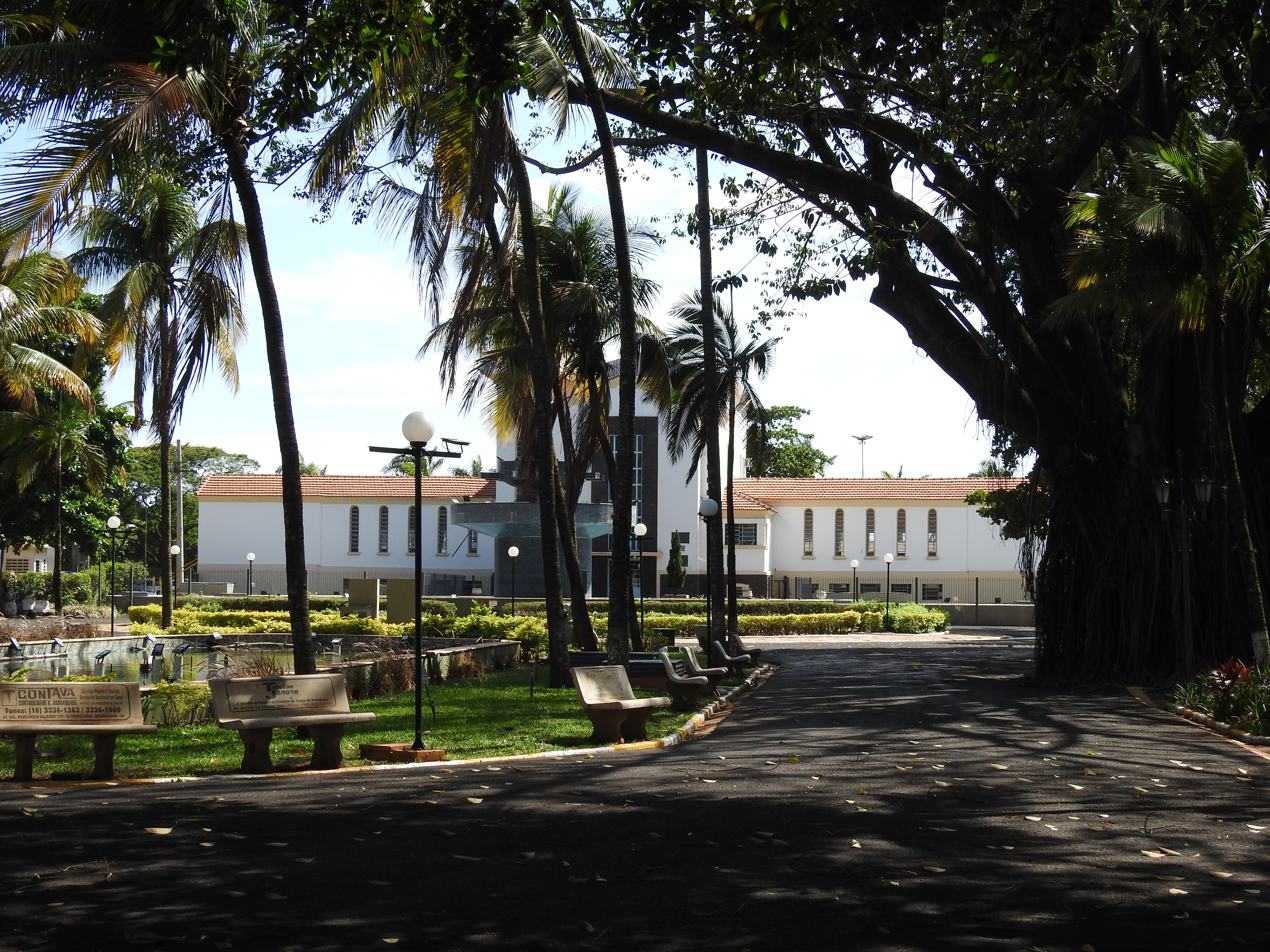
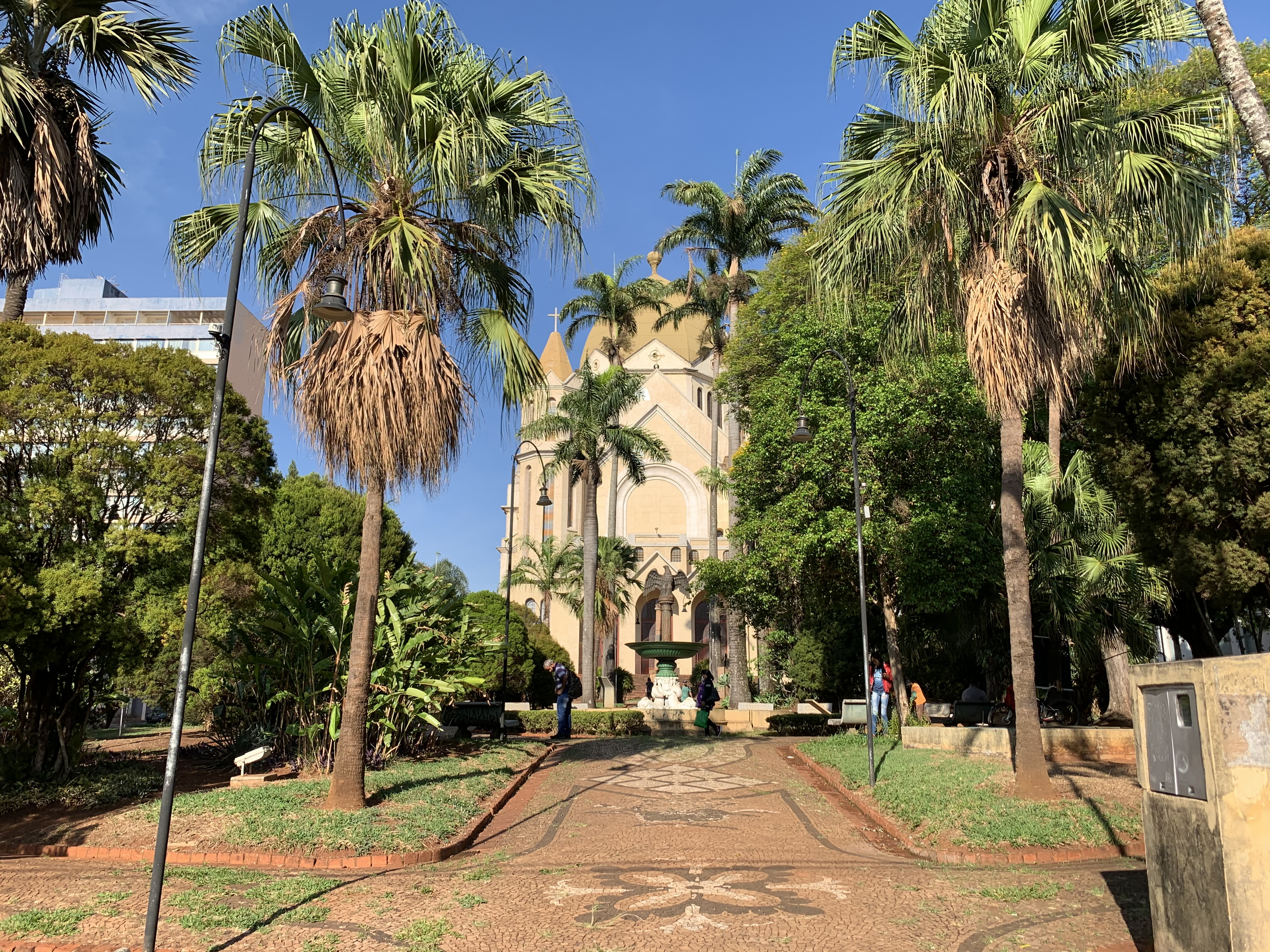
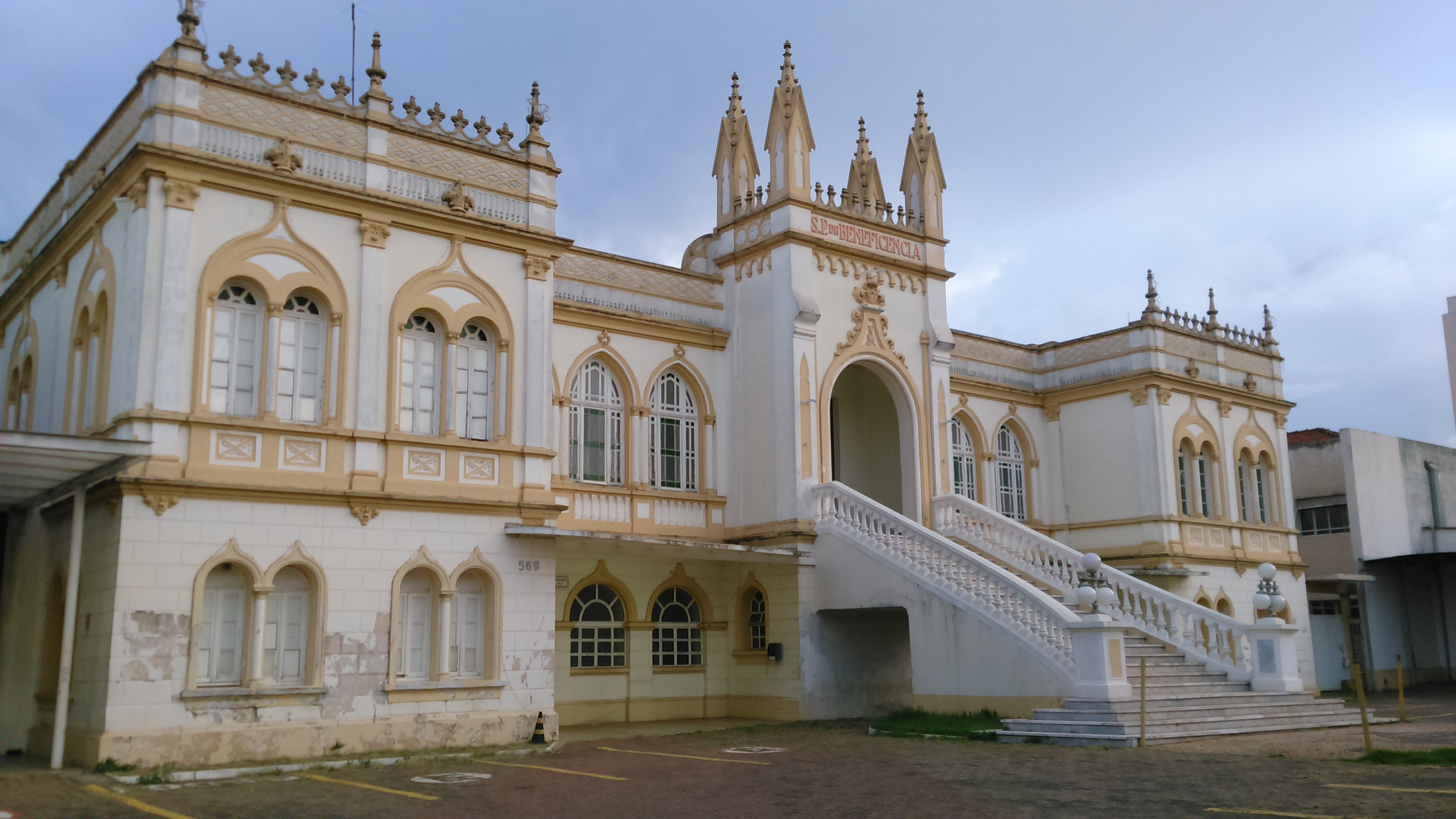
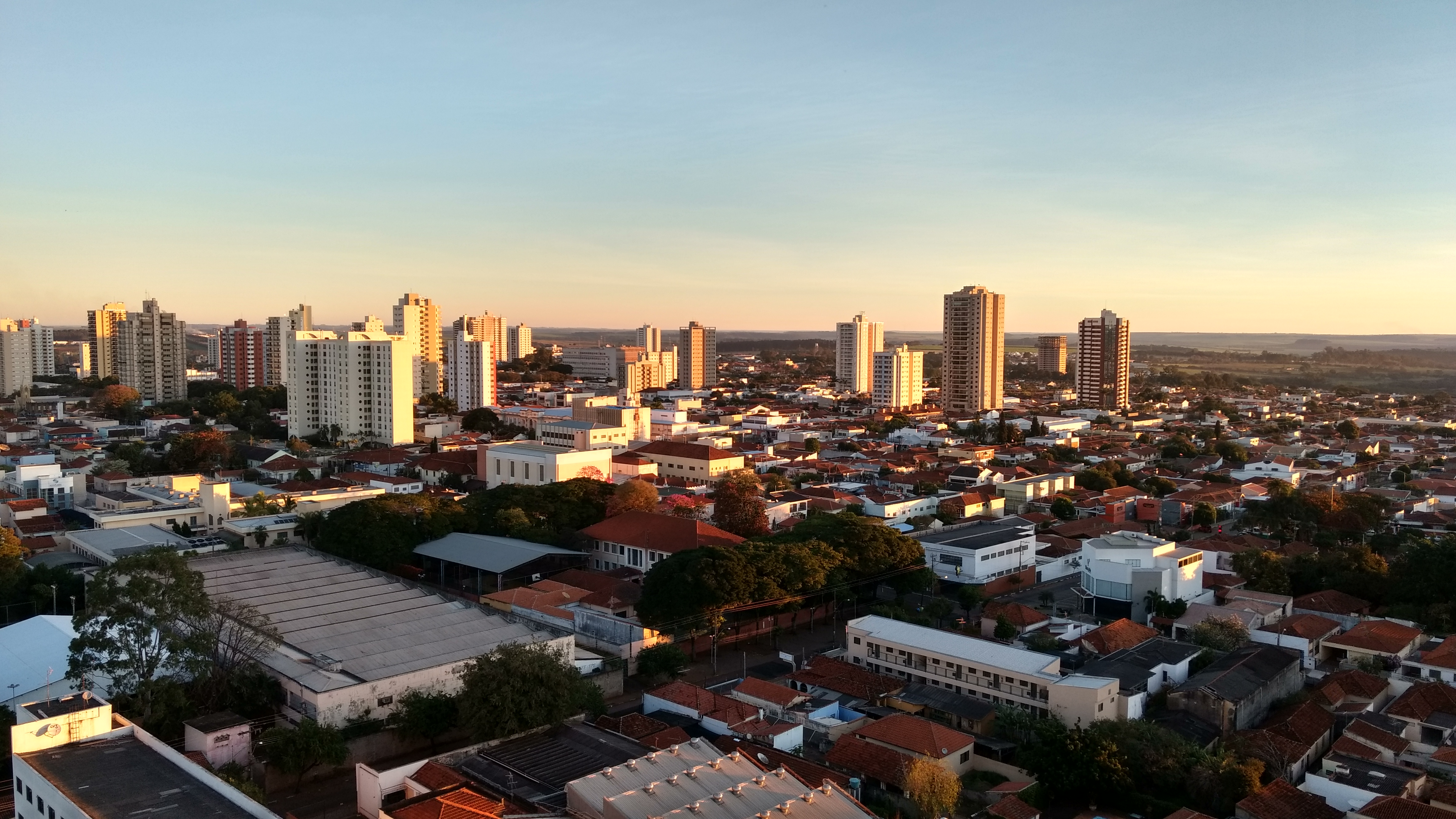
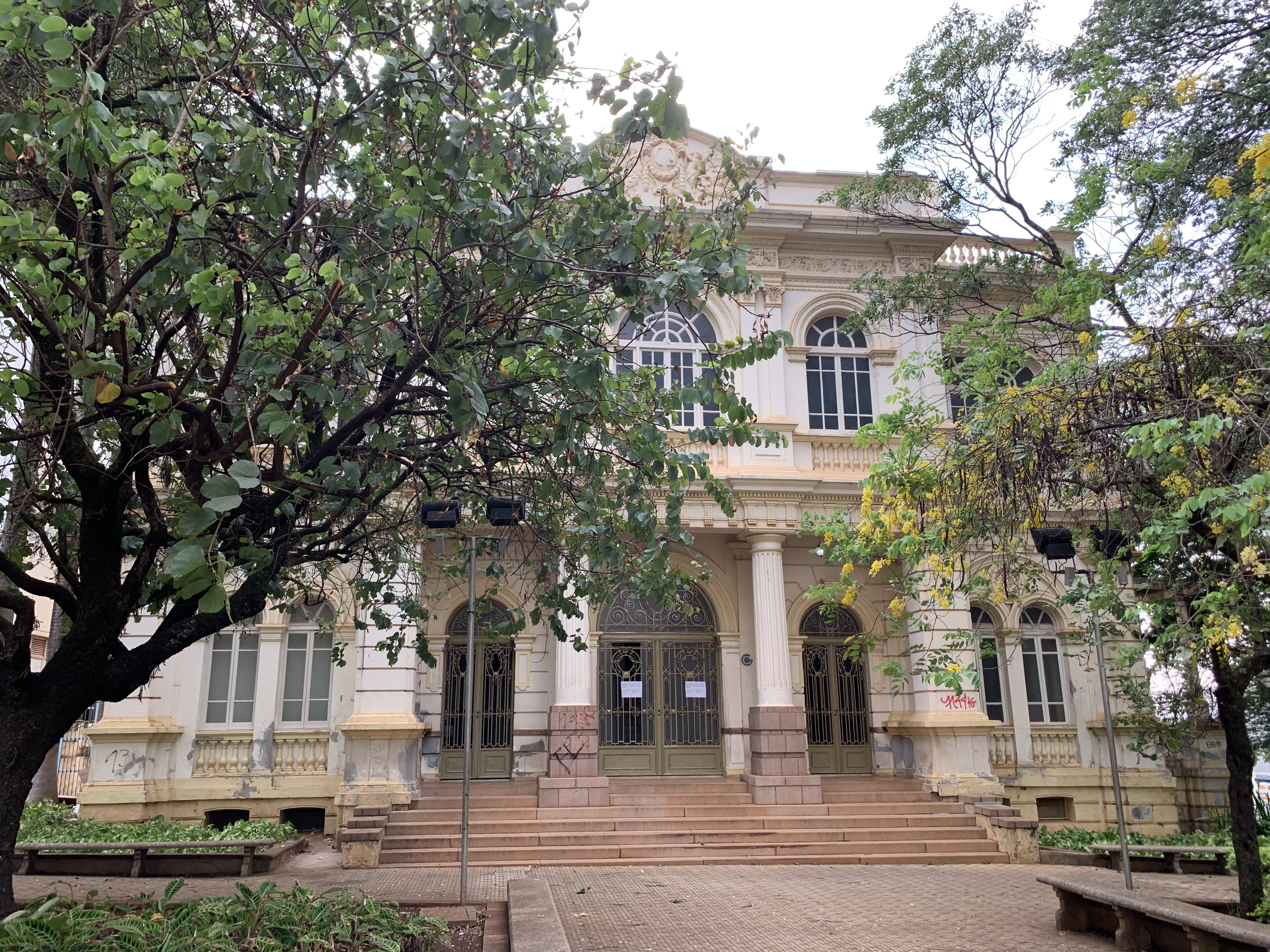
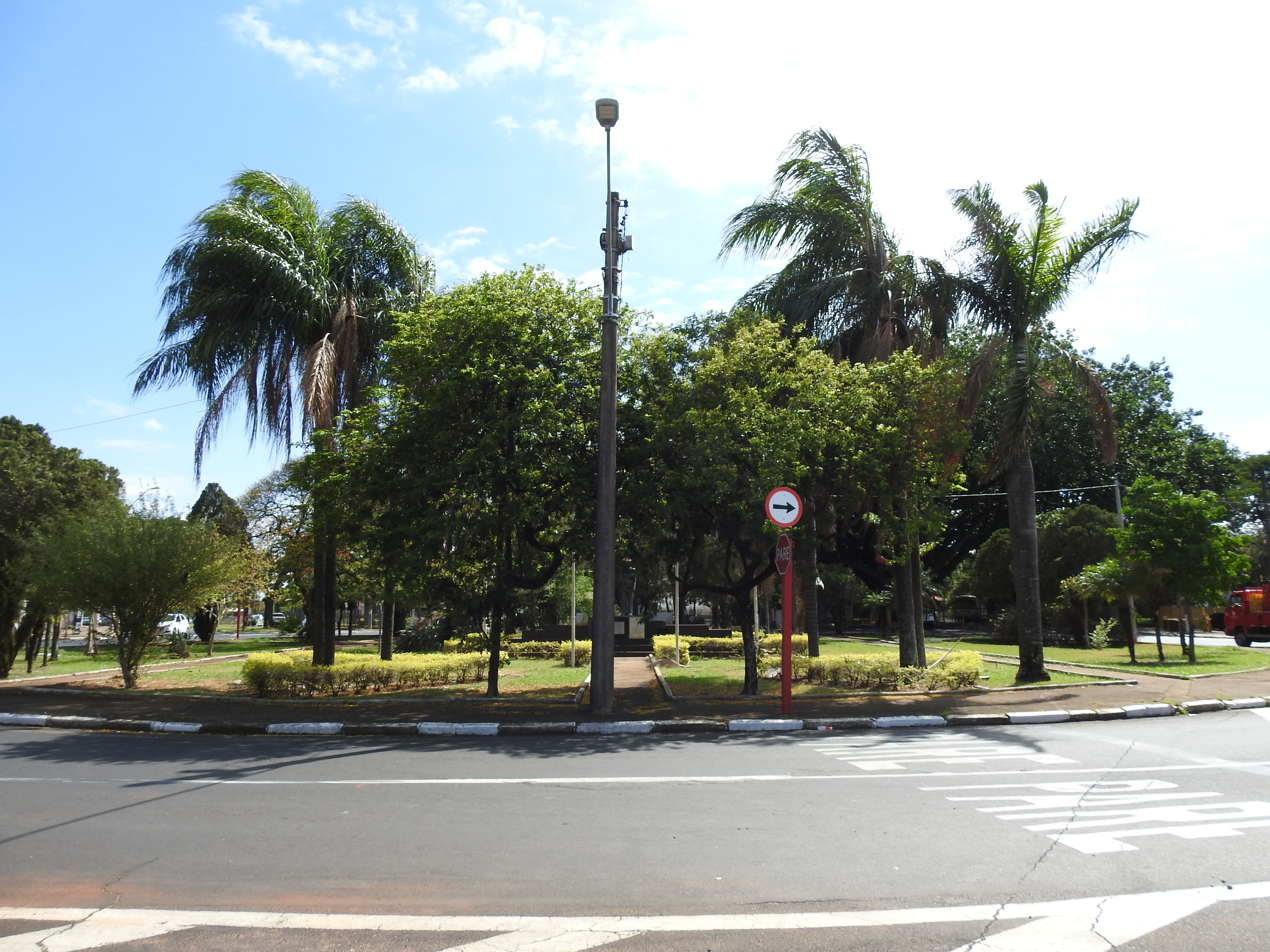
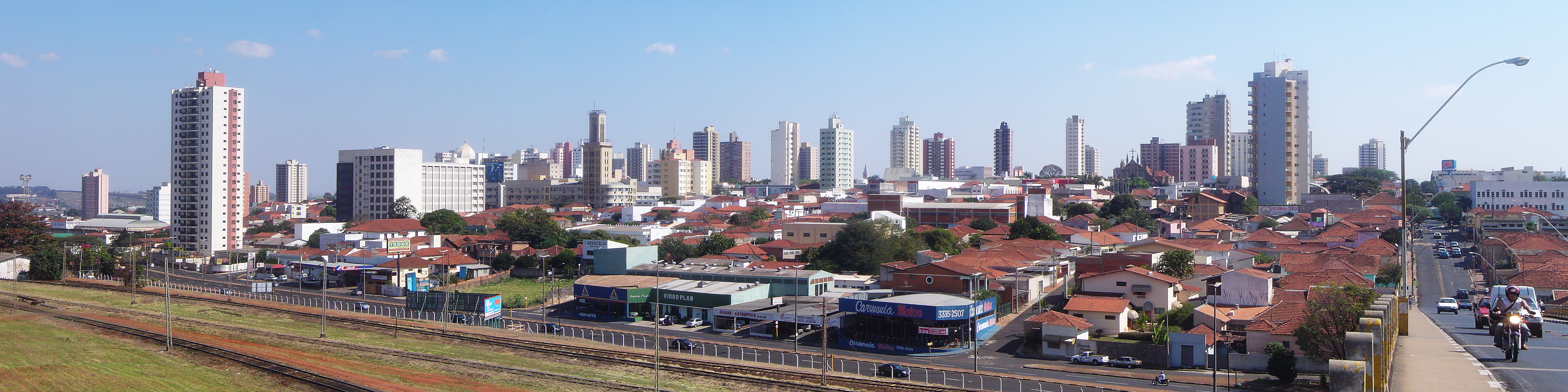

- Flag Coat of arms
- Motto: Altior altissimo semper (Latin); Always louder
- Location in São Paulo

- Location in Brazil
- Coordinates: 21°47′38″S 48°10′33″W
- Country: Brazil
- Region: Southeast
- State: São Paulo

Government
  - Mayor: Luis Claudio Lapena Barreto (PL)

Area
  - Total: 1,004 km^{2} (388 sq mi)
- Elevation: 664 m (2,178 ft)

Population (2022 Brazilian census)
  - Total: 242,228
  - Estimate (2025): 253,474
  - Density: 241.35/km^{2} (625.1/sq mi)
- Time zone: UTC– 03:00 (BRT)
  - Summer (DST): UTC– 02:00 (BRST)
- Postal code: 14801
- Area code: +(55) 16
- HDI (2010): 0.815 – very high
- Website: www.araraquara.sp.gov.br

Araraquara (Brazilian Portuguese pronunciation: [ɐˌɾaɾɐˈkwaɾɐ] or [aˌɾaɾɐˈkwaɾɐ]) is a city in the state of São Paulo in Brazil. The population is 242,228 (2022 census) in an area of 1,004 km^{2} (388 sq mi). It is also known as "the abode of the sun," because of its impressive sunset and because of its hot weather, especially in summer. The city was founded in 1817.

== History ==
=== Etymology ===
There are two possible origins for the name of the city, one that links it to the Tupi-Guarani language of the region's indigenous inhabitants, and another that relates it to the Língua Geral of São Paulo. The two versions come from similar expressions, "arará kûara" and "arara kûara", which mean "lair of the macaws."

== Demographics ==
Historical population (municipality)
Year	Population	%±
1920	48,119
1940	67,724	40.7%
1950	62,688	−7.4%
1960	82,898	32.2%
1970	100,438	21.2%
1980	128,122	27.6%
1991	166,731	30.1%
2000	182,471	9.4%
2010	208,662	14.4%
2022	242,228	16.1%

== Geography ==
The city is in the Microregion of Araraquara, part of the Mesoregion of Araraquara, 270 km north of São Paulo.

== Media ==
In telecommunications, the city was served by Companhia Telefônica Brasileira until 1973, when it began to be served by Telecomunicações de São Paulo. In July 1998, this company was acquired by Telefónica, which adopted the Vivo brand in 2012.

The company is currently an operator of cell phones, fixed lines, internet (fiber optics/4G) and television (satellite and cable).

== Transport ==
The city is served by Bartolomeu de Gusmão Airport.

== Sport ==
Ferroviária is the local football (soccer) team of the city organized back in 1950 by the railroad workers at EFA – Araraquara Railroad Company (Estradas de Ferro de Araraquara). The team is known as "Locomotives" and plays home matches at Estádio Fonte Luminosa, which has a maximum seating capacity of 27,000 people.

Ferroviária also has a very competitive professional female soccer team organized in 2001 that started to collect titles almost straight away. The Ferroviária Women Soccer team got its first state title in 2002 – the São Paulo State championship. The women's team did it again in 2004, 2005 and 2013 to rake up four state titles. The Ferroviaria women soccer team kept evolving in structure to get national projection – it won in 2014 the Copa do Brasil and two more national titles, the Brasileirão in 2014 and 2019. They also reached two most important titles for the women soccer in Americas. In March 2021, the Ferroviaria Women soccer team won its second title of Libertadores da America championship in 2020 edition (due to COVID-19 limitations). The first title at Libertadores da America came on 2015. Lindsay Camila is the Ferrroviaria Women Soccer team coach.

== Climate ==
Climate data for Araraquara, elevation 628 m (2,060 ft), (2004–2012 normals, extremes 2004–2013)
Month	Jan	Feb	Mar	Apr	May	Jun	Jul	Aug	Sep	Oct	Nov	Dec	Year
Record high °C (°F)	38.1 (100.6)	37.1 (98.8)	36.8 (98.2)	36.5 (97.7)	33.2 (91.8)	31.6 (88.9)	34.4 (93.9)	38.1 (100.6)	40.3 (104.5)	42.6 (108.7)	39.5 (103.1)	37.3 (99.1)	42.6 (108.7)
Mean daily maximum °C (°F)	29.8 (85.6)	31.6 (88.9)	30.8 (87.4)	30.1 (86.2)	26.2 (79.2)	26.3 (79.3)	26.9 (80.4)	30.0 (86.0)	30.6 (87.1)	31.0 (87.8)	30.8 (87.4)	30.9 (87.6)	29.6 (85.2)
Daily mean °C (°F)	25.0 (77.0)	25.7 (78.3)	25.1 (77.2)	23.8 (74.8)	20.1 (68.2)	19.5 (67.1)	19.9 (67.8)	22.0 (71.6)	23.5 (74.3)	24.7 (76.5)	24.7 (76.5)	25.3 (77.5)	23.3 (73.9)
Mean daily minimum °C (°F)	20.1 (68.2)	19.9 (67.8)	19.4 (66.9)	17.6 (63.7)	13.9 (57.0)	12.7 (54.9)	12.9 (55.2)	14.0 (57.2)	16.4 (61.5)	18.4 (65.1)	18.6 (65.5)	19.7 (67.5)	17.0 (62.5)
Record low °C (°F)	14.1 (57.4)	13.6 (56.5)	12.6 (54.7)	9.7 (49.5)	2.7 (36.9)	0.9 (33.6)	2.9 (37.2)	2.4 (36.3)	4.1 (39.4)	8.7 (47.7)	11.1 (52.0)	12.7 (54.9)	0.9 (33.6)
Average precipitation mm (inches)	267.6 (10.54)	161.6 (6.36)	119.0 (4.69)	72.3 (2.85)	38.5 (1.52)	28.0 (1.10)	20.1 (0.79)	23.5 (0.93)	47.3 (1.86)	101.4 (3.99)	126.5 (4.98)	206.8 (8.14)	1,212.6 (47.75)
Average precipitation days (≥ 1.0 mm)	17.1	12.1	13.3	8.1	5.9	3.9	3.0	1.8	4.2	7.3	7.6	15.3	99.6
Source: Centro Integrado de Informações Agrometeorológicas

== Notable people ==
- Careca - football player, Italian Champion (SSC Napoli 1990)
- Rosa Branca - basketball player, World Champion and Olympic medallist
- Fernanda Venturini - volleyball player, Olympic medallist
- Roseli Gustavo - basketball player, Olympic medallist
- Zé Celso - stage actor, director and playwright
- Ignacio de Loyola Brandão - writer
- Herbert Richers - film and dubbing producer
- Dorival Junior - football coach
- Beatriz Zaneratto João - soccer player
- Liniker - singer
- Lívia Renata Souza - UFC fighter
- Olegário Tolói de Oliveira - soccer player
- Lauro Chaman - cyclist

== See also ==
- List of municipalities in São Paulo
- Interior of São Paulo
- Municipal Chamber of Araraquara
