= Ibaté =

- Municipality
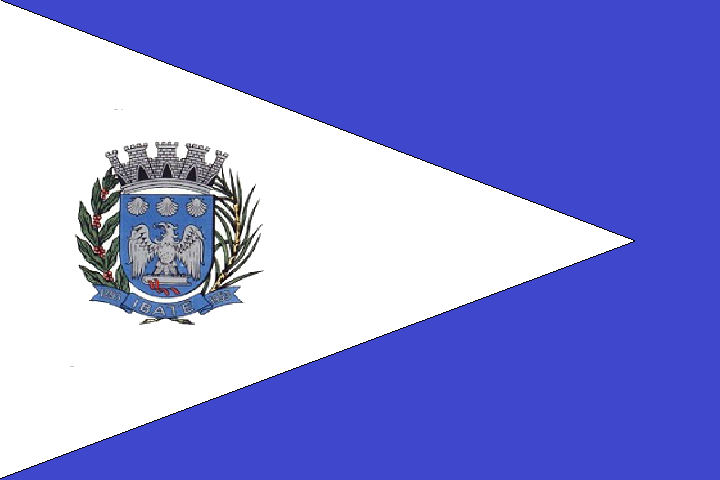
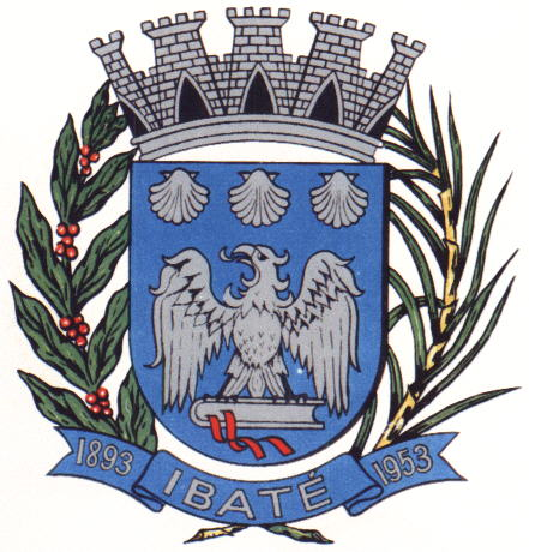
- Flag Coat of arms
- Nickname: Encanto do Planalto
- Location of Ibaté
- Coordinates: 21°57′18″S 47°59′49″W
- Country: Brazil
- Region: Southeast
- State: São Paulo
- Mesoregion: Araraquara
- Established: 2009

Government
  - Mayor: José Luiz Parella

Area
  - Total: 289.544 km^{2} (111.794 sq mi)
- Elevation: 839 m (2,753 ft)

Population (2020)
  - Total: 35,472
  - Density: 105.74/km^{2} (273.9/sq mi)
- Time zone: UTC−3 (BRT)
- Postal Code: 14815-000
- Area code: +55 16
- Website: Prefecture of Ibaté, SP

Ibaté is a municipality in the state of São Paulo, Brazil with a population of 35,472 in 2020 according to IBGE. The city's name comes from the Tupi language and means "dry lake".

Ibaté is located on the east-center of the state, 12 km from São Carlos and 247 km from the city of São Paulo.

== History ==
The origins and development of the city has relation with the coffee production on the region, at the end of the 19th century. The village of São João Batista da Lagoa was founded on January 29, 1893. In 1900 the village was elevated to district, with the name of Vila de Ibaté.

On December 30, 1953, Ibaté was officially established as a municipality.

== Media ==
In telecommunications, the city was served by Companhia Telefônica Brasileira until 1973, when it began to be served by Telecomunicações de São Paulo. In July 1998, this company was acquired by Telefónica, which adopted the Vivo brand in 2012.

The company is currently an operator of cell phones, fixed lines, internet (fiber optics/4G) and television (satellite and cable).

== See also ==
- List of municipalities in São Paulo
- Interior of São Paulo
