= Analândia =

Municipality in the state of São Paulo in Brazil

- Municipality
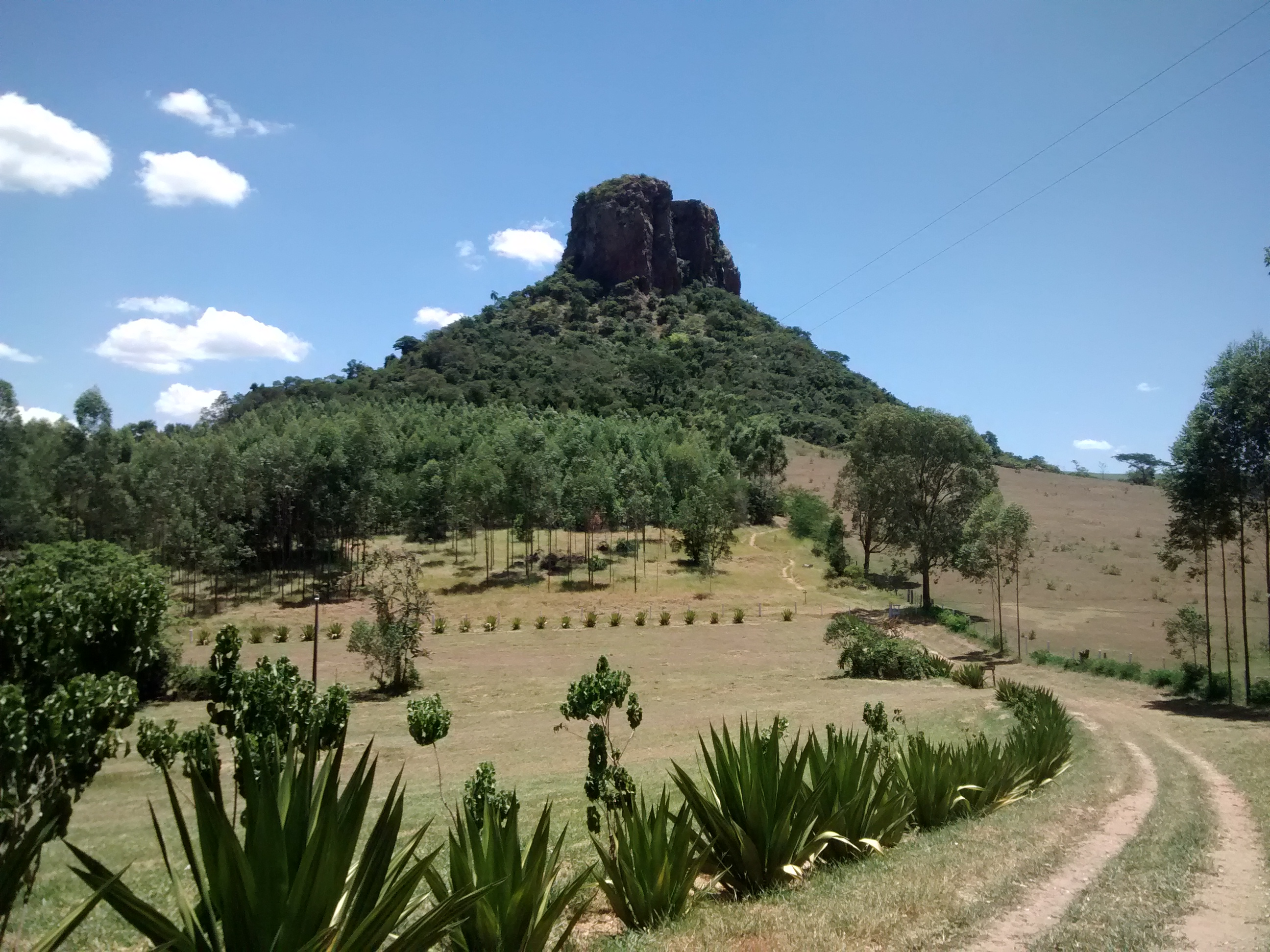

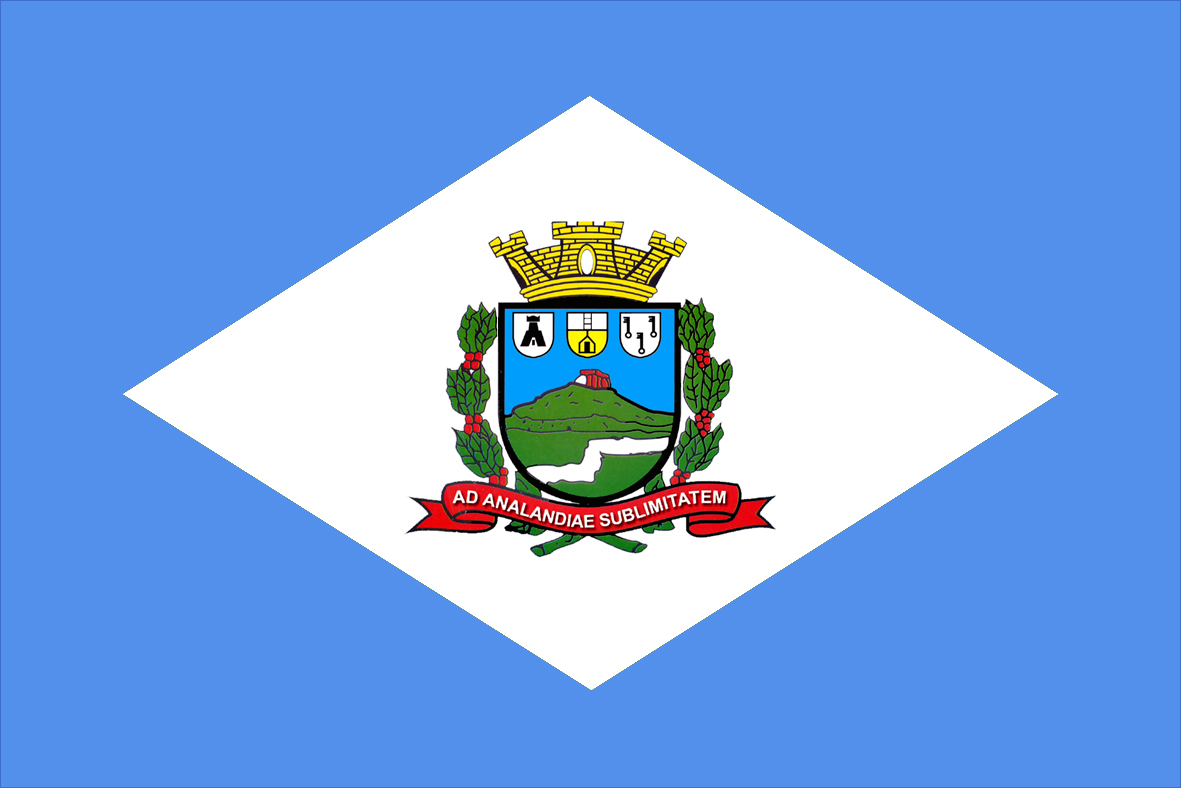
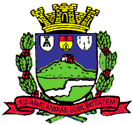
- Flag Coat of arms

- Location in São Paulo state

- Location in Brazil
- Coordinates: 22°7′36″S 47°39′48″W
- Country: Brazil
- Region: Southeast
- State: São Paulo

Area
  - Total: 326 km^{2} (126 sq mi)

Population (2020)
  - Total: 5,056
  - Density: 15.5/km^{2} (40.2/sq mi)
- Time zone: UTC−3 (BRT)

Analândia is a Brazilian municipality of the state of São Paulo. The population is 5,056 (2020 est.) in an area of 326 km^{2}. Its original given name in 1887 was Cuscuzeiro, later changing to Anápolis in 1890, and finally taking on the name of Analândia in 1944 to distinguish itself from a homonymous municipality. The originally referenced Cuscuzeiro is a 900 meters tall hill that has now become a local touristic attraction.

It was the location of the Brazilian version of The Simple Life, entitled Simple Life: Mudando de Vida.

== Demographics ==
Historical population (municipality)
| Year | Population | %± |
|---|---|---|
| 1920 | 7,393 |
| 1940 | 4,908 | −33.6% |
| 1950 | 3,653 | −25.6% |
| 1960 | 2,870 | −21.4% |
| 1970 | 2,612 | −9.0% |
| 1980 | 2,312 | −11.5% |
| 1991 | 3,020 | 30.6% |
| 2000 | 3,582 | 18.6% |
| 2010 | 4,293 | 19.8% |
| 2022 | 4,589 | 6.9% |

== Media ==
In telecommunications, the city was served by Companhia Telefônica Brasileira until 1973, when it began to be served by Telecomunicações de São Paulo. In July 1998, this company was acquired by Telefónica, which adopted the Vivo brand in 2012.

The company is currently an operator of cell phones, fixed lines, internet (fiber optics/4G) and television (satellite and cable).

== Religion ==
Christianity is present in the city as follows:

=== Catholic Church ===
The Catholic church in the municipality is part of the Roman Catholic Diocese of Limeira.

=== Protestant Church ===
The most diverse evangelical beliefs are present in the city, mainly Pentecostal, including the Assemblies of God in Brazil Church (the largest evangelical church in the country), Christian Congregation in Brazil, among others. These denominations are growing more and more throughout Brazil.

== See also ==
- List of municipalities in São Paulo
- Interior of São Paulo
