= Ipiranga (São Paulo Metro) =

Future railway station in São Paulo, Brazil

General information
- Location: Av. Presidente Wilson, Ipiranga; São Paulo; Brazil
- Owner: Government of the State of São Paulo
- Operator: Companhia do Metropolitano de São Paulo
- Platforms: Side platforms

Construction
- Structure type: Elevated
- Accessible: y

History
- Opening: 2027

Services
Preceding station	São Paulo Metro	Following station
Terminus	Line 15	Vila Prudente towards Jacu-Pêssego

Out-of-system interchange
Preceding station	São Paulo Metropolitan Trains	Following station
Juventus-Mooca towards Palmeiras-Barra Funda	Line 10 transfer at Ipiranga	Tamanduateí towards Rio Grande da Serra
Track layout
Line track layout
Location

Ipiranga is a future monorail station of São Paulo Metro. It will belong to Line 15-Silver, which is currently in expansion and should begin in this station, connecting with Line 2-Green in Vila Prudente. Located in the district of Ipiranga in São Paulo, it will connect with homonymous station of Line 10-Turquoise. Construction works officially began in August 2024, with opening planned to 2027.
