= Ipiranga (CPTM) =

Train station in São Paulo, Brazil

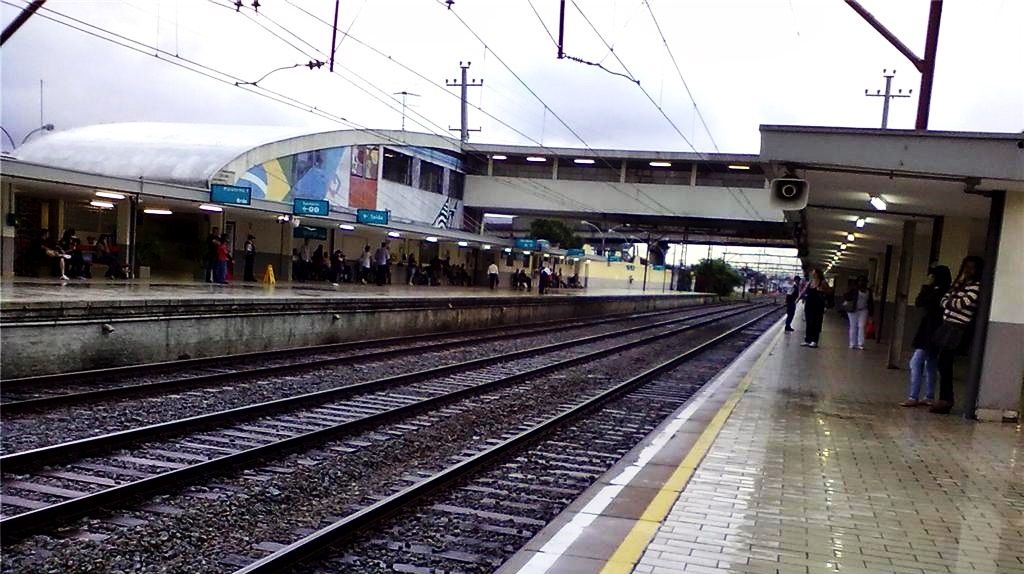
- Platforms of CPTM Ipiranga stations during rain in São Paulo.

General information
- Location: Av. Presidente Wilson, 3473; Ipiranga; Brazil
- Coordinates: 23.5825036°S 46.5965849°W
- Owner: Government of the State of São Paulo
- Operator: CPTM
- Platforms: Side platforms
- Connections: (under construction) (planned)

Construction
- Structure type: At-grade

Other information
- Station code: IPG

History
- Opened: 1 April 1886
- Rebuilt: Mid-1960
- Former names: Ypiranga

Services
Preceding station	São Paulo Metropolitan Trains	Following station
Juventus-Mooca towards Palmeiras-Barra Funda	Line 10	Tamanduateí towards Rio Grande da Serra
Out-of-system interchange
Preceding station	São Paulo Metro	Following station
Terminus	Line 15 transfer at Ipiranga	Vila Prudente towards Jacu-Pêssego
Future services
Bom Pastor towards Capão Redondo	Line 5 transfer at Ipiranga	Terminus
Track layout
Location

Ipiranga is a train station on CPTM Line 10-Turquoise, located in the city of São Paulo. The station is located on the west side of Vila Prudente district.

== History ==
Ipiranga station opened on 1 April 1886, to serve as a support structure to the project for the Ipiranga Museum. It was built between 1885 and 1890. After World War II, an industrial boom in the surrounding region increased the station's use. This industrial movement reached its highest point in the 1950s, with the arrival of the Ford Motor Co. factory in 1953, which rerouted railroads to reach its installations. From the 1950s, thousands of workers used this station as their daily transport.

Estrada de Ferro Santos-Jundiaí set plans for construction of a new building to open in mid-1960. With the beginning of de-industrialization, Ipiranga station lost its importance as the old industries gave place to empty warehouses. This migration movement of industrial plants to other locations also reached the Ford factory, which closed in 2001, transferring the production to Camaçari, Bahia). Unlike other unoccupied factories and still active, Ford's factory was partially demolished, becoming a shopping mall.

Since 1 June 1994, the station is operated by CPTM.

=== Projects ===
==== New station ====
On 11 May 2005, the consortium composed of Maubertec and Herjack companies was hired by CPTM at the cost of 845,974 BRL (505,714.64 USD). With additives, the cost reached 888,036.85 BRL (530,859.39 USD) to rebuild stations Mooca, Ipiranga, Utinga and Prefeito Saladino. On 29 March 2008, the projects were delivered. CPTM signed them up in the Growth Acceleration Program (PAC), contemplated in the pre-selection phase. With the 2014 economic crisis, many PAC financings were cancelled, including the reconstruction.

==== Expresso Tiradentes ====
The project of the Expresso Tiradentes BRT was to connect Ipiranga station with the train station; only part of the structure was implemented. It may be implemented along with the future Metro Line 15-Silver station.

==== Subway stations ====
The São Paulo Metro planned the expansion of Line 15-Silver between Vila Prudente and Ipiranga, to become the line terminus. This project has no implementation date. During the opening of stations Sapopemba, Fazenda da Juta and São Mateus, Alexandre Baldy, Secretary of Metropolitan Transports, stated that the state government is willing to announce the beginning of the construction of the monorail station in 2020.

Another project is the planned expansion of Metro Line 5-Lilac from Chácara Klabin station towards Ipiranga. Funds are not allocated.

== Toponymy ==
The word "ipiranga" comes from the Tupi language ypiranga and means "red river", formed by a junction of the terms y (water, river) and piranga (red).

In 2010, State Deputies José Bittencourt (PRB) and Vaz de Lima (PSDB) tried to rename the station to Ipiranga-Pastor Alfreto Reikdal, after the homonymous obscure religious leader, but the proposal was rejected.

According to CPTM studies in the 22nd Week of Metroviary Technology of the Metro Engineers and Architects Association (AEAMESP), the cost for an intermediary station like Ipiranga renaming is almost 620,000 BRL (177,584.28 USD), a reason why CPTM avoids renaming stations, except when obligated by law.

	Disused railways	
Moóca toward Jundiaí	Trunk line The São Paulo Railway Company	São Caetano toward Santos
Mooca toward Luz	Line D-Beige; CPTM	Tamanduateí toward Paranapiacaba
