= Guapituba (CPTM) =

Railway station in São Paulo, Brazil

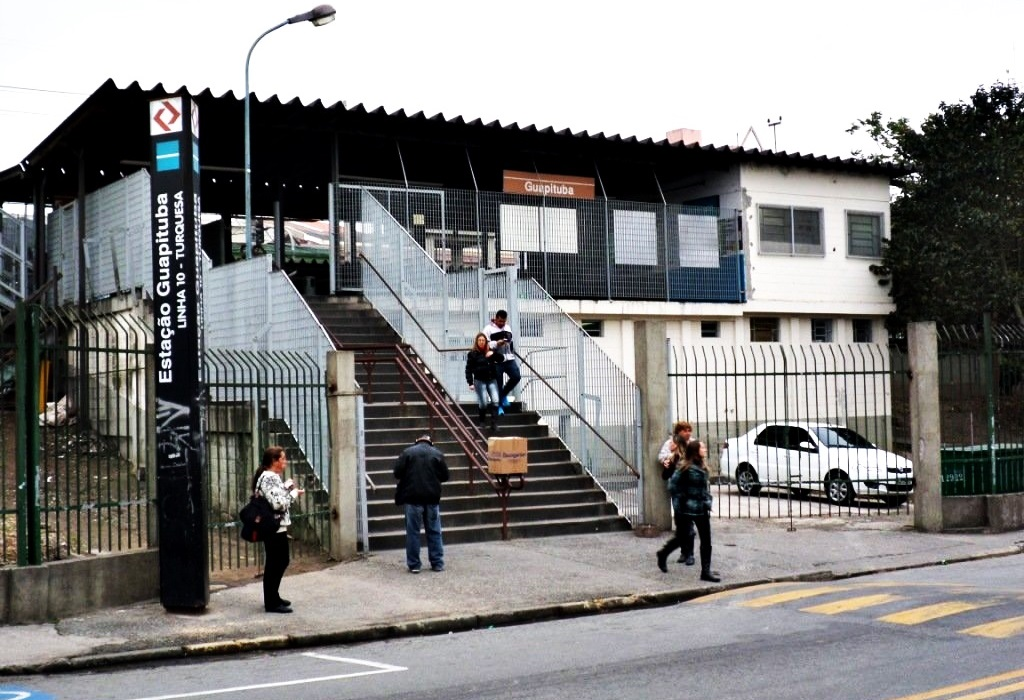
- View of the entrance of Guapituba station in 2014.

General information
- Location: Av. Capitão João, s/n Jardim Guapituba; Brazil
- Coordinates: 23.692172°S 46.448532°W
- Owner: Government of the State of São Paulo
- Operator: CPTM
- Platforms: Side platforms

Construction
- Structure type: At-grade

Other information
- Station code: GPT

History
- Opened: 1 May 1907
- Rebuilt: 4 June 1983
- Former names: Km 50

Services
Preceding station	São Paulo Metropolitan Trains	Following station
Mauá towards Palmeiras-Barra Funda	Line 10	Ribeirão Pires-Antônio Bespalec towards Rio Grande da Serra
Track layout
Location

Guapituba is a train station on CPTM Line 10-Turquoise, located in the city of Mauá.

== History ==
In 1907, São Paulo Railway opened in the location the telegraph post Quilômetro 50. The passengers movement grew slowly, so that Quilômetro 50 post was a sporadic boarding point until the 1970s, not appearing in maps from 1954 to 1970.

The region around the station grew a lot during the 1960s and 1970s, specially with the arrival of lots o migrants to Parque das Américas, Jardim Santa Rosa, Parque Aliança and Vila Gomes. Also there was great movement in favor of the construction of Parque das Américas station, specially by Saint Philip the Apostle Parish represented by its first vicar, Father José João Rogério Maria Mahon.

According to local residents and the Parish history, practically all the manifestations were organized by the church, until they won and station construction began in 1982. Named Guapituba for being located in the homonymous Mauá neighbourhood, the station was opened on 4 June 1983.

In 1994, started being operated by CPTM as part of Line D-Beige (Luz ↔ Paranapiacaba).

	Disused railways	
Pilar toward Jundiaí	Trunk line The São Paulo Railway Company	Ribeirão Pires toward Santos
Mauá toward Luz	Line D-Beige; CPTM	Ribeirão Pires toward Paranapiacaba
