= Juventus-Mooca (CPTM) =

Metro station of CPTM in the municipy of São Paulo, Brazil

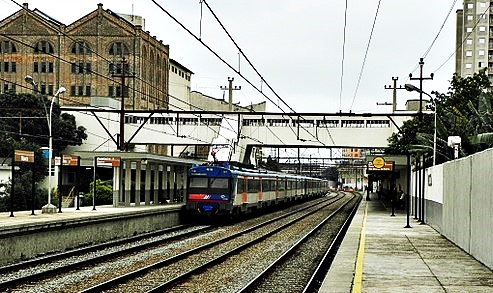
- CPTM TUE Series 2100 parked in the platform towards Brás.

General information
- Location: Av. Presidente Wilson, 483; Cambuci; Brazil
- Coordinates: 23.557157°S 46.608827°W
- Owner: Government of the State of São Paulo
- Operator: CPTM
- Platforms: Side platforms

Construction
- Structure type: At-grade

Other information
- Station code: MOC

History
- Opened: 7 September 1898
- Rebuilt: Mid-1960
- Former names: Mooca; Moóca

Services
Preceding station	São Paulo Metropolitan Trains	Following station
Brás towards Palmeiras-Barra Funda	Line 10	Ipiranga towards Rio Grande da Serra
Track layout
Location

Juventus-Mooca is a train station on CPTM's Line 10-Turquoise. It's located in the city of São Paulo.

== History ==
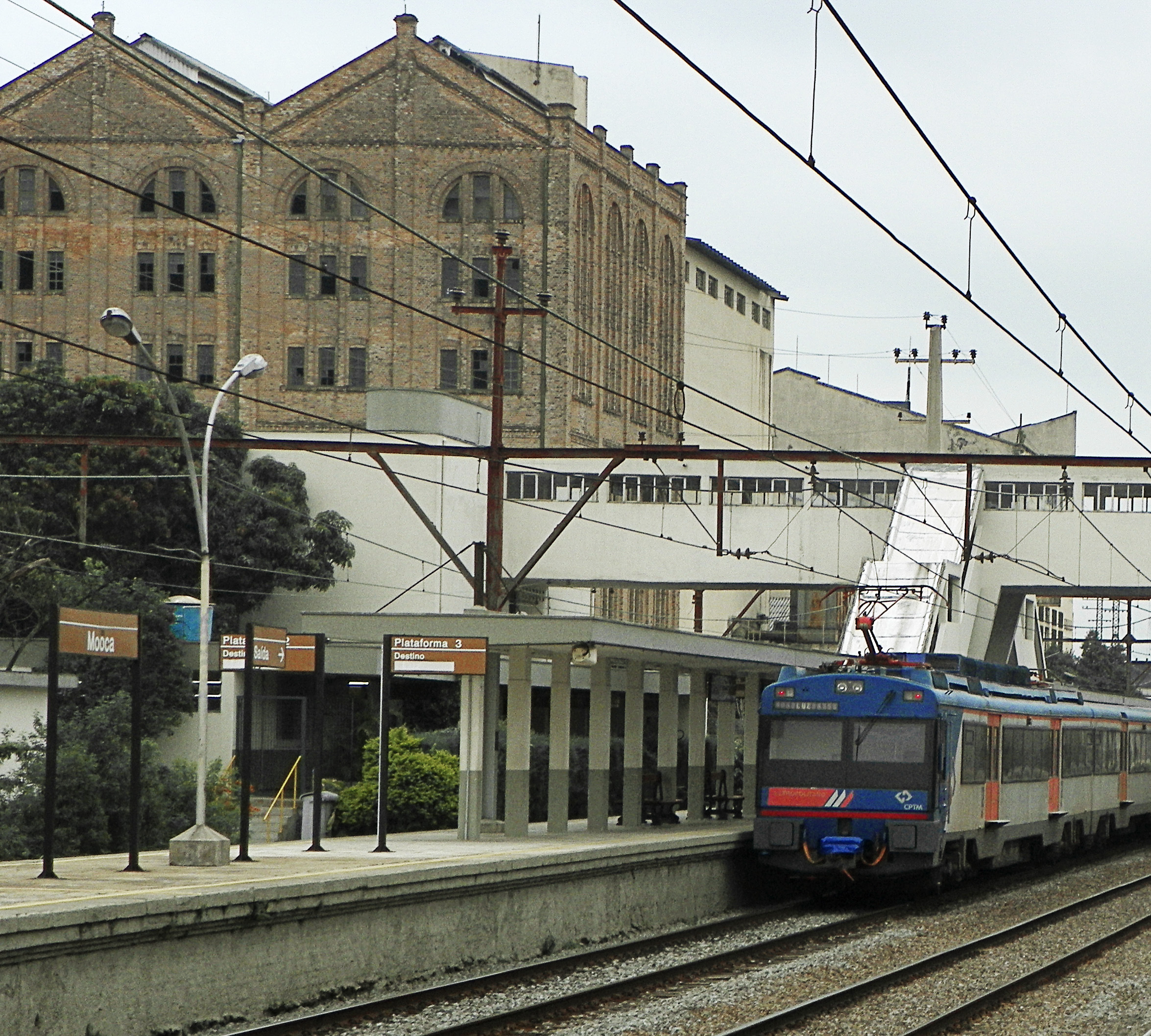
The factory of Bavária beer (current Antarctica) gave rise to the station.

With the implementation of São Paulo Railway in 1867, many residential and industrial urban agglomerations were formed around it, instigating the creation of new station (besides the original ones predicted). On 20 October 1892, the beer factory Bavária de Henrique Stupakoff & Cia. was built. Located by the railway in Mooca, in a farmhouse belonging to the engineer and surveyor Daniel Fox, the Bavária factory increase the people and cargo traffic in the region. Thus, São Paulo Railway implanted Mooca station next to the factory, opened by São Paulo Railway on 7 September 1898.

The movement in Mooca station grew as other factories were built around it, being one of the main railway warehouses in São Paulo.

During the São Paulo Revolt of 1924, the station's yard was bombed, resulting in great damage to the installations. The increase of factory activities brought a larger amount of passenger, turning the station edification built in 1898 obsolete with time. After the nationalization of the railway in 1946, a slow modernization project was executed through American financing.

A new building was built and opened in 1960, being the current station installation. With the decrease of factory activity in its surroundings and frequent floodings which stop the train traffic in the region, the station loss its importance and passengers. Since 1 June 1984, it's operated by CPTM.

The lack of accessibility to the station is a frequent target of complaints from local residents.

=== Projects ===
On 11 May 2005, the consortium composed by Maubertec and Herjack companies was hired by CPTM by the cost of 845,974 BRL (505,714.64 USD) - with additives, the cost of the contract was of 888,036.85 BRL (530,859.39 USD) to make projects of rebuilt for stations Mooca, Ipiranga, Utinga and Prefeito Saladino. On 29 March 2008, the projects were delivered. CPTM signed them up in the Growth Acceleration Program (PAC), being contemplated in the pre-selection phase. With the 2014 economic crisis, many PAC financings were cancelled, including the reconstruction of the stations.

== Toponymy ==
The station was named Mooca in 1898, for attending the homonymous neighbourhood. According to the lexicographer and Tupi expert Eduardo de Almeida Navarro, the word Mooca comes from the old tupi term mũoka, which means "relative's house", formed by a junction of the terms mũ (relative) and oka (house).

In 2010, a small group of Mooca residents claimed for the change of the station's name to Juventus-Mooca, after the name of the Juventus Athletic Club, founded in the neighbourhood in 1924 by Italian immigrants. On 26 November 2015, the State Law No. 16018/2015 was published, renaming the Mooca station to Juventus-Mooca.

According to CPTM studies in the 22nd Week of Metroviary Technology of the Metro Engineers and Architects Association (AEAMESP), the cost for an intermediary station like Mooca renaming is almost 620,000 BRL (177,584.28 USD), a reason why CPTM avoids the renaming of station, except when obligated by law.

	Disused railways	
Hospedaria dos Immigrantes; Deactivated toward Jundiaí	Trunk line The São Paulo Railway Company	Ypiranga toward Santos
Brás toward Luz	Line D-Beige; CPTM	Ipiranga toward Paranapiacaba
