= Utinga (CPTM) =

Railway station in São Paulo, Brazil

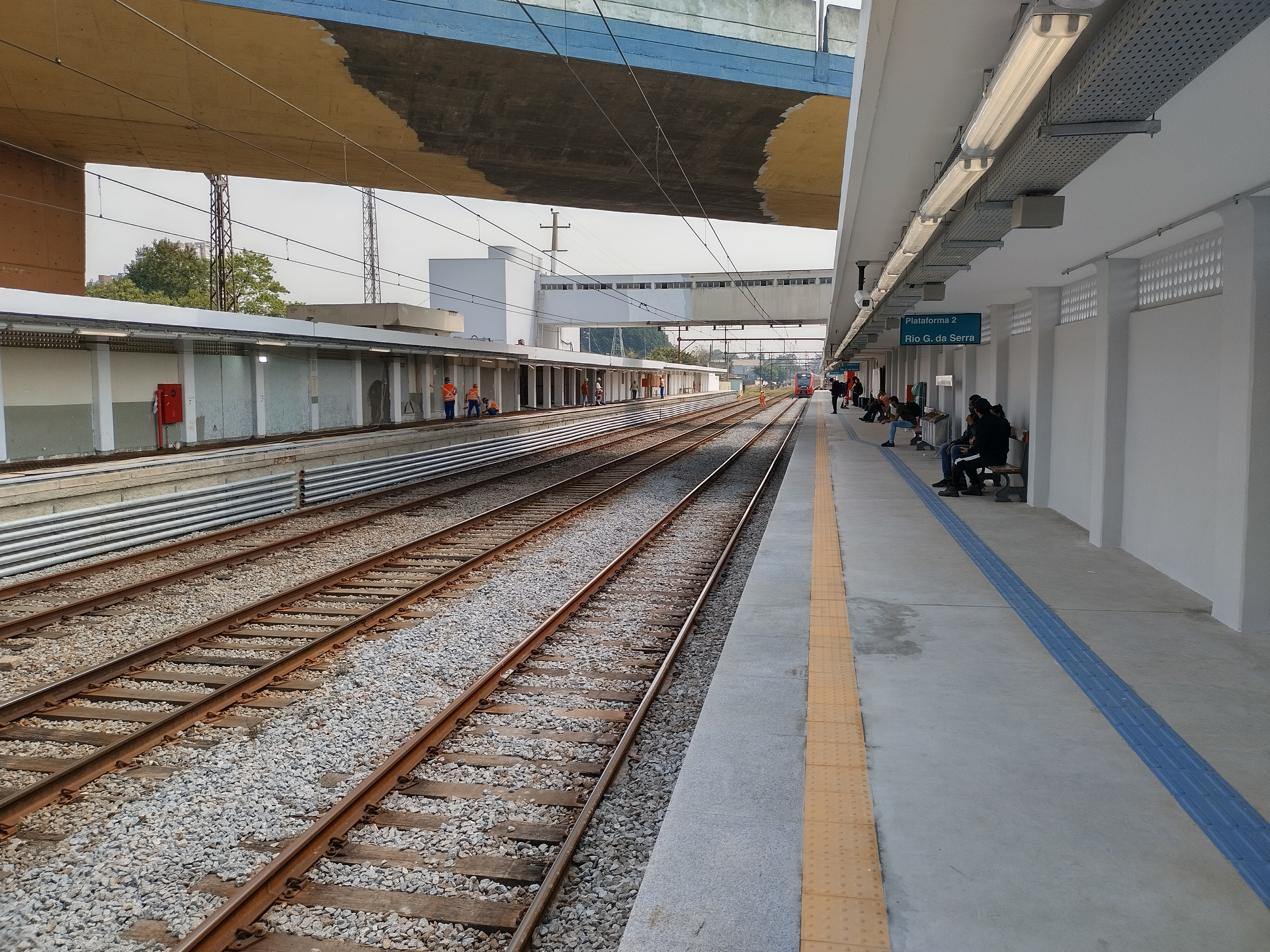
- View from platform of Utinga station in Santo André.

General information
- Location: Av da Paz, s/n Utinga; Brazil
- Coordinates: 23.6261442°S 46.544078°W
- Owner: Government of the State of São Paulo
- Operator: CPTM
- Platforms: Side platforms

Construction
- Structure type: At-grade

Other information
- Station code: UTG

History
- Opened: 1 August 1933
- Rebuilt: Mid-1960

Services
Preceding station	São Paulo Metropolitan Trains	Following station
São Caetano do Sul-Pref. Walter Braido towards Palmeiras-Barra Funda	Line 10	Prefeito Saladino towards Rio Grande da Serra
Track layout
Location

Utinga is a train station on CPTM Line 10-Turquoise, located in the district of Utinga, city of Santo André.

== History ==
In April 1932, São Paulo Railway announced the construction of Utinga station to attend the homonymous neighbourhood in Santo André. On 1 August 1933, the station was opened. In mid-1960, a new building was built to attend the growing demand.

The station was transferred from the federal administration (CBTU) to the state administration (CPTM) on 1 June 1994. In 2000, a small group, composed mostly by gypsies, invaded an area next to the station, originating Utinga favela. With the time, the number of robberies in the station's surroundings and in its facilities and trains raised, and the perpetrators looked for refuge in the favela's alleys.

=== Projects ===
On 11 May 2005, the consortium composed by Maubertec and Herjack companies was hired by CPTM by the cost of 845,974 BRL (505,714.64 USD) - with additives, the cost of the contract was of 888,036.85 BRL (530,859.39 USD) to make projects of rebuilt for stations Mooca, Ipiranga, Utinga and Prefeito Saladino. On 29 March 2008, the projects were delivered. CPTM signed them up in the Growth Acceleration Program (PAC), being contemplated in the pre-selection phase. With the 2014 economic crisis, many PAC financings were cancelled, including the reconstruction of the stations.

== Toponymy ==
The term Utinga comes from the Tupi language, which means "white water", through the junction of the terms y (water) and ting (white).

	Disused railways	
São Caetano toward Jundiaí	Trunk line The São Paulo Railway Company	São Bernardo toward Santos
São Caetano toward Luz	Line D-Beige; CPTM	Prefeito Saladino toward Paranapiacaba
