= Capuava (CPTM) =

Railway station in São Paulo, Brazil

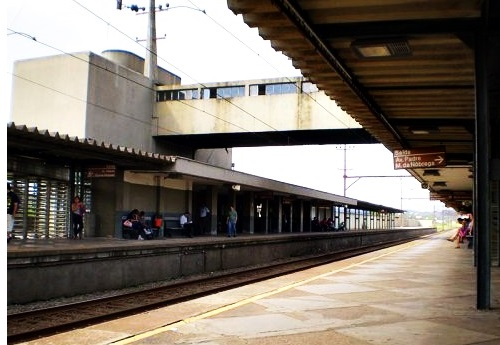
- View from the station platforms in Mauá.

General information
- Location: Av. Padre Manuel da Nóbrega, s/n Capuava; Brazil
- Coordinates: 23.658357°S 46.490096°W
- Owner: Government of the State of São Paulo
- Operator: CPTM
- Platforms: Side platforms

Construction
- Structure type: At-grade

Other information
- Station code: CPV

History
- Opened: 15 September 1920
- Rebuilt: Mid-1960

Services
Preceding station	São Paulo Metropolitan Trains	Following station
Pref. Celso Daniel-Santo André towards Palmeiras-Barra Funda	Line 10	Mauá towards Rio Grande da Serra
Track layout
Location

Capuava is a train station on CPTM Line 10-Turquoise, located in the city of Mauá. It was opened in 1920 as a telegraph post and, in 1960, its original building was replaced by the one who is up until today.

	Disused railways	
Pirelli; Deactivated toward Jundiaí	Trunk line The São Paulo Railway Company	Pilar toward Santos
Pirelli; Deactivated toward Luz	Line D-Beige; CPTM	Mauá toward Paranapiacaba
