= Pref. Celso Daniel-Santo André (CPTM) =

Railway station in São Paulo, Brazil

Prefeito Celso Daniel-Santo André
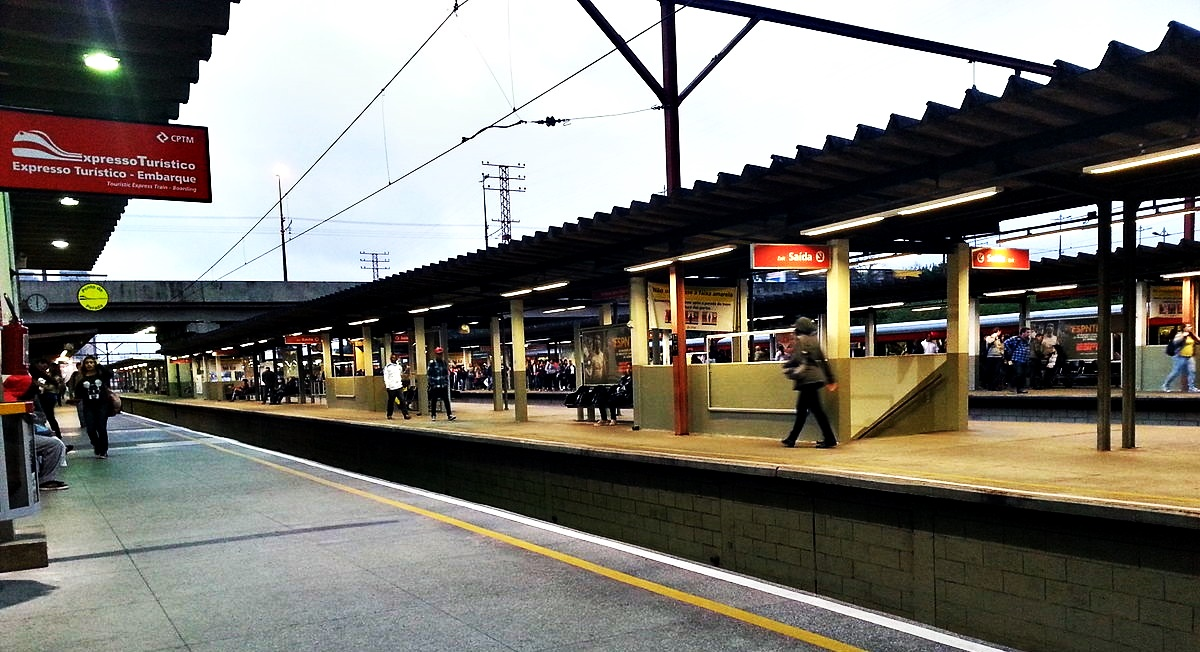
- View of the platforms of the station in September 2014.

General information
- Location: Rua Itambé, 67; Center; Brazil
- Coordinates: 23.652244°S 46.528221°W
- Owner: Government of the State of São Paulo
- Operator: CPTM
- Platforms: Side and island platforms
- Connections: 20 (planned); São Paulo–Paranapiacaba Touristic Express; East Santo André Metropolitan Terminal; West Santo André Metropolitan Terminal; São Mateus–Jabaquara Metropolitan Corridor

Construction
- Structure type: At-grade

Other information
- Station code: SAN

History
- Opened: 16 February 1867
- Closed: Mid-1977
- Rebuilt: 6 March 1979
- Former names: São Bernardo; Santo André

Services
Preceding station	São Paulo Metropolitan Trains	Following station
Prefeito Saladino towards Palmeiras-Barra Funda	Line 10	Capuava towards Rio Grande da Serra
São Caetano do Sul-Pref. Walter Braido towards Tamanduateí	Express Line 10	Terminus
Luz Terminus	Touristic Express	Paranapiacaba Terminus
Future out-of-system interchange
Preceding station	São Paulo Metro	Following station
Portugal towards Santa Marina	Line 20 (proposed) transfer at Pref. Celso Daniel-Santo André	Terminus
Track layout
Location

Prefeito Celso Daniel-Santo André, or informally known only as Santo André, is a train station on CPTM Line 10 (Turquoise), in the city of Santo André.

== History ==
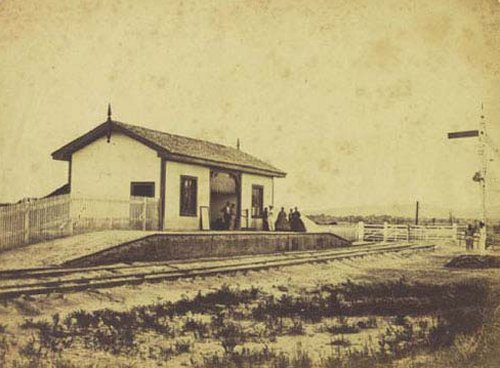
The station at the time of its opening. Photo by Militão de Azevedo.

The station was opened on 16 February 1867, being part of Santos–Jundiaí Railway. At the time, it was named São Bernardo, as the city of Santo André "didn't exist yet" and the closest city was São Bernardo. However, the station was fundamental to what is the city of Santo André nowadays. The district was created in 1910 and promoted to city in 1938. However, the old designation was kept until 1934.

With the growing of the São Paulo Metropolitan Region, the station was slowly prioritizing the urban trains service. In 1975, from the 6,780,434 passengers of the station, 95% of them were from the called suburban trains. In 1977, the original station was demolished and, in 1979, a new structure was opened, which is the same until nowadays. The trains that stopped by the stations quitted traveling to Santos in 1996. In December 2002, after the murder of Mayor Celso Daniel, the station was renamed after him.

	Disused railways	
Utinga toward Jundiaí	Trunk line The São Paulo Railway Company	Pirelli; Deactivated toward Santos
Prefeito Saladino toward Luz	Line D (Beige); CPTM	Pirelli; Deactivated toward Paranapiacaba
