= Mauá (CPTM) =

Railway station in São Paulo, Brazil

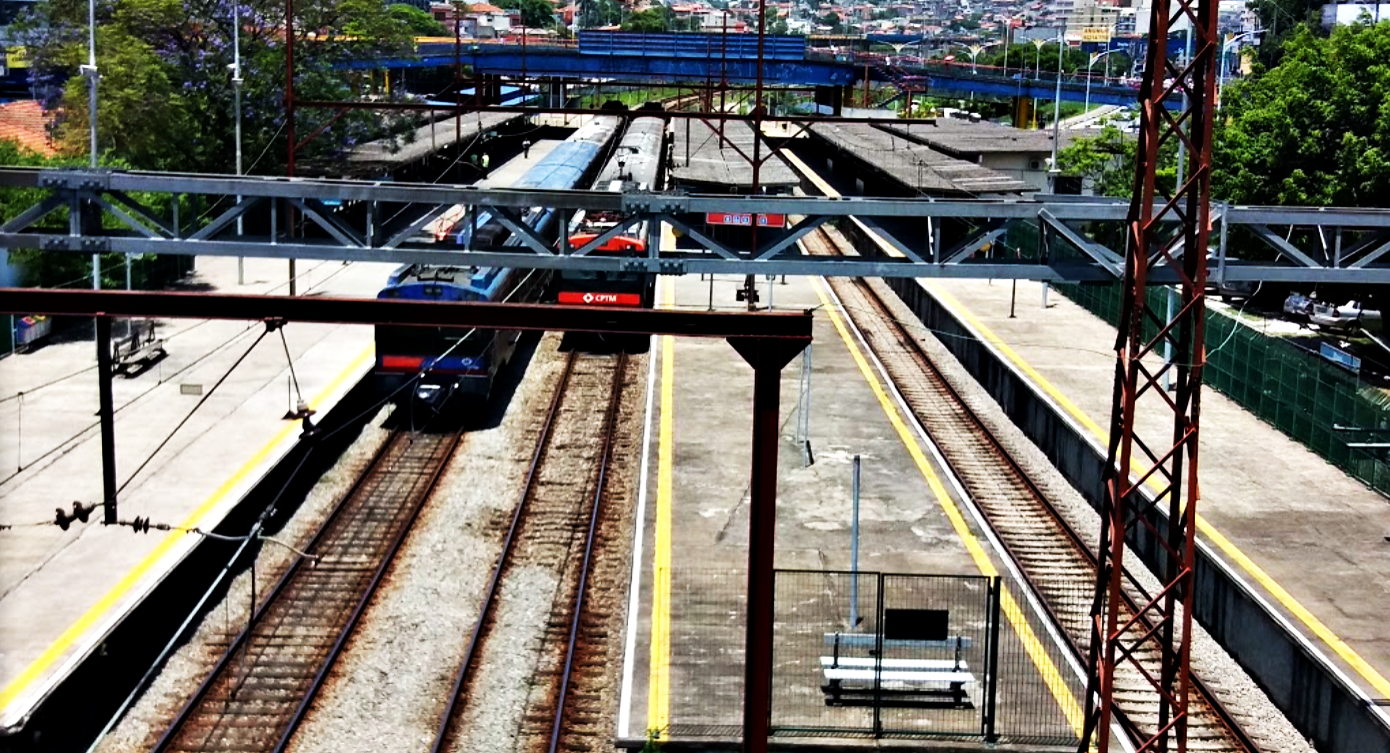
- View of the Mauá station platforms in 2017.

General information
- Location: Av. Rio Branco, s/n Center; Brazil
- Coordinates: 23.6682°S 46.4615°W
- Owner: Government of the State of São Paulo
- Operator: CPTM
- Platforms: Side platforms
- Connections: Mauá Bus Terminal

Construction
- Structure type: At-grade

Other information
- Station code: MAU

History
- Opened: 1 April 1883
- Rebuilt: 27 March 1978
- Former names: Pilar

Services
Preceding station	São Paulo Metropolitan Trains	Following station
Capuava towards Palmeiras-Barra Funda	Line 10	Guapituba towards Rio Grande da Serra
Track layout
Location

Mauá is a train station on CPTM, commuter rail in Sao Paulo, Brazil, Line 10-Turquoise, located in the city of Mauá.

== History ==
The construction of the railway, which began in Santos' docks and went towards São Paulo, started in May 1860. Project and build the railway were big challenges for the British technicians. The solution adopted to transpose Serra do Mar was to build many tilted surfaces, with a 10% of declive, and use stationary locomotives to transport the trains through cables.

São Paulo Railway, organized in London, was made to build the railway that would connect Santos to Jundiaí. The opening of the railway was on 16 February 1867 and significantly improved the transport of agricultural products from the countryside to Santos Docks, specially the coffee produced in São Paulo, improving the local development.

The growing of the then-called Vila do Pilar encouraged the Superintendence of São Paulo Railway Company to install a new station of the railway in that location. In 1883, Pilar station was opened, all constructed in wood, which would represent a key to the industrialization process of the future city. In 1926, Pilar station was renamed to Mauá.

=== New station ===
In the 1970s, occurred a growing in the demand of passengers in the station, which couldn't handle with that movement. On 26 January 1976, after another failure in the suburban trains, RFFSA decided to build a new station, as the recovery of the old building was impracticable. The new station was opened on 27 March 1979.

	Disused railways	
Capuava toward Jundiaí	Trunk line The São Paulo Railway Company	Guapituba toward Santos
Capuava toward Luz	Line D-Beige; CPTM	Guapituba toward Paranapiacaba
