= Prefeito Saladino (CPTM) =

Railway station in São Paulo, Brazil

General information
- Location: Praça Armando Arruda, s/n Campestre; Brazil
- Coordinates: 23.6384257°S 46.5365893°W
- Owner: Government of the State of São Paulo
- Operator: CPTM
- Platforms: Side platforms
- Connections: Prefeito Saladino Bus Terminal; Santo André Road Terminal

Construction
- Structure type: At-grade

Other information
- Station code: PSA

History
- Opened: 29 November 1952
- Rebuilt: 29 March 1966

Services
Preceding station	São Paulo Metropolitan Trains	Following station
Utinga towards Palmeiras-Barra Funda	Line 10	Pref. Celso Daniel-Santo André towards Rio Grande da Serra
Track layout
Location

Prefeito Saladino is a train station on CPTM Line 10-Turquoise, located in the city of Santo André.

== History ==
Prefeito Saladino stop was implemented on 29 November 1952. With the growing of the region, a new building was built between 1964 and 1966, being opened on 29 March 1966. On this date, the stop was promoted to station.

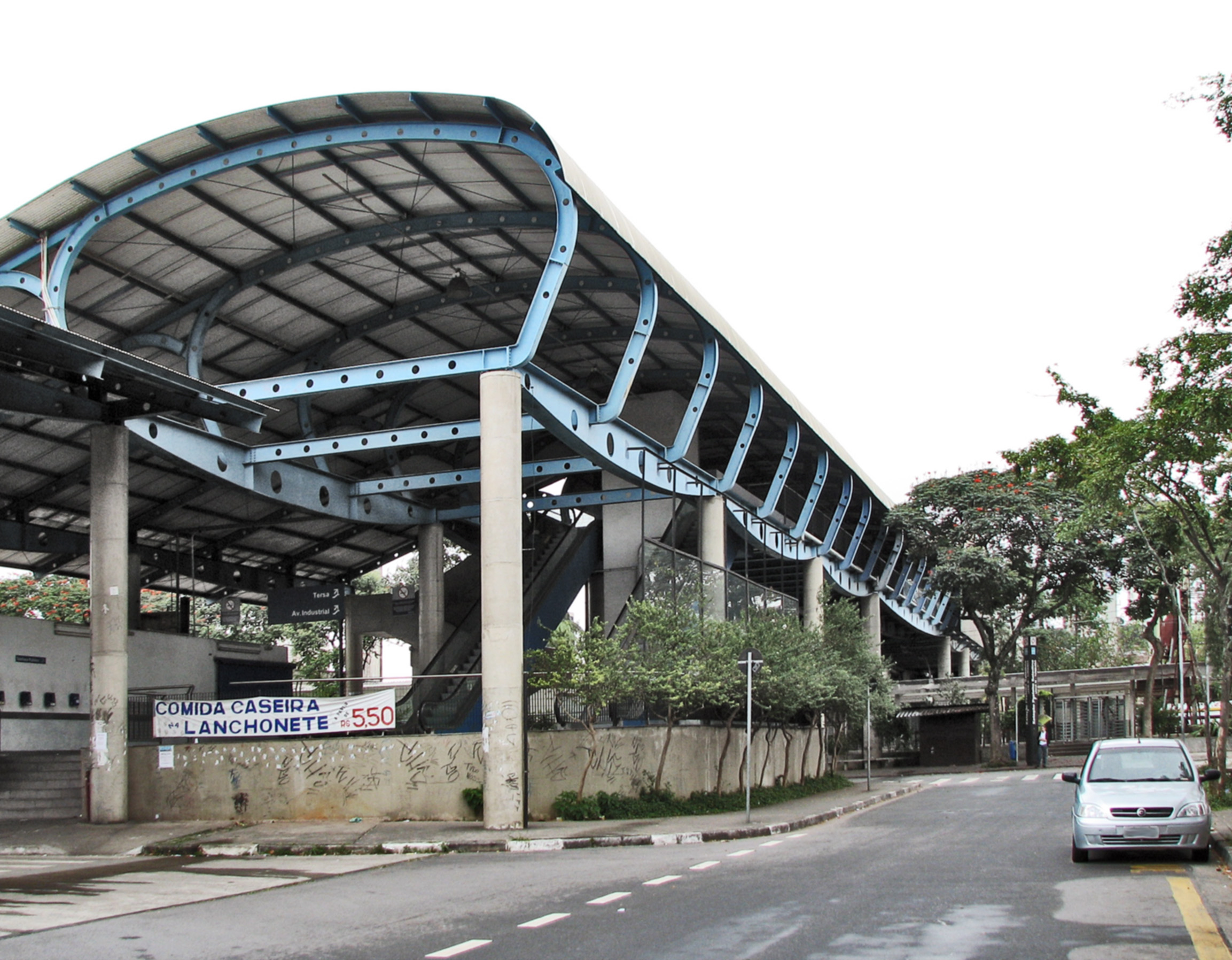
An image of Prefeito Saladino (CPTM)

The construction of the new stations encouraged SESI to install a facility in its surroundings in 1972. Decades later, Santo André Prefecture, in partnership with the private initiative, installed the new city bus terminal next to the station, being opened in 2000, with a catwalk above the tracks, predicting a connection with the new station building, projected since 2005.

Prefeito Saladino station was transferred from the federal administration (CBTU) to the state administration (CPTM) on 1 June 1994.

=== Projects ===
On 11 May 2005, the consortium composed by Maubertec and Herjack companies was hired by CPTM by the cost of R$ 845,974 (US$ 505,714.64) - with additives, the cost of the contract was of R$ 888,036.85 (US$ 530,859.39) to make projects of rebuilt for stations Mooca, Ipiranga, Utinga and Prefeito Saladino. On 29 March 2008, the projects were delivered. CPTM signed them up in the Growth Acceleration Program (PAC), being contemplated in the pre-selection phase. With the 2014 economic crisis, many PAC financings were cancelled, including the reconstruction of the stations.

In December 2019, a leaked report included the station in the projects of future São Paulo Metro Line 20-Pink as one of its terminus. The information was not officially confirmed by the state government of São Paulo.

== Toponymy ==
The station was named after Saladino Cardoso Franco (1873–1951), Mayor of São Bernardo do Campo between 1914 and 1930.

== In popular culture ==
Prefeito Saladino station was scenario for some scenes in the Brazilian film Antônia.

	Disused railways	
Utinga toward Luz	Line D-Beige; CPTM	Prefeito Celso Daniel-Santo André toward Paranapiacaba
