= São Caetano do Sul-Pref. Walter Braido (CPTM) =

Railway station in São Paulo, Brazil

São Caetano do Sul-Prefeito Walter Braido
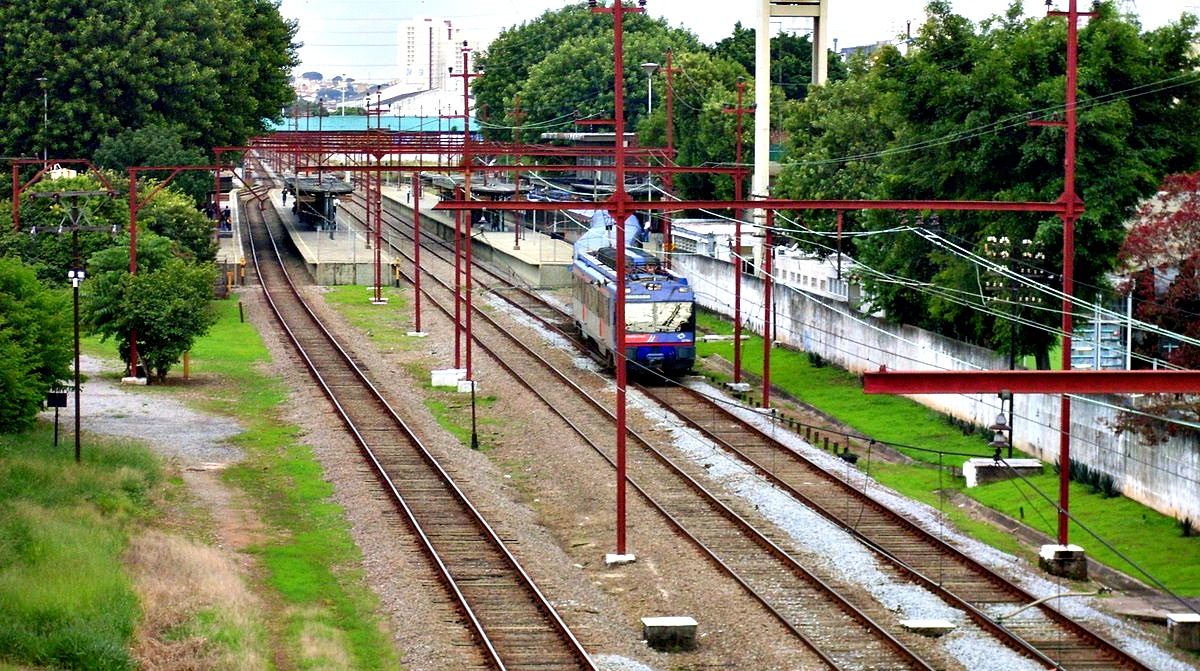
- CPTM TUE Series 2100 leaving São Caetano station towards Brás.

General information
- Location: R. Serafim Constantino, 51; Center; Brazil
- Coordinates: 23.6261442°S 46.544078°W
- Owner: Government of the State of São Paulo
- Operator: CPTM
- Platforms: 1 side platform 3 island platforms
- Connections: São Caetano Bus Terminal; São Caetano Road Terminal

Construction
- Structure type: At-grade
- Architect: Franco Luciano Polloni

Other information
- Station code: SCT

History
- Opened: 1 May 1883
- Rebuilt: 20 December 1973
- Former names: São Caetano

Services
Preceding station	São Paulo Metropolitan Trains	Following station
Tamanduateí towards Palmeiras-Barra Funda	Line 10	Utinga towards Rio Grande da Serra
Tamanduateí Terminus	Express Line 10	Pref. Celso Daniel-Santo André Terminus
Track layout
Location

São Caetano do Sul-Prefeito Walter Braido, unofficially called only as São Caetano or São Caetano do Sul, is a train station on CPTM Line 10-Turquoise.

The station is located in the center of the city of São Caetano do Sul, in the ABC Region.

In January 2015, the then-called São Caetano station was renamed to São Caetano do Sul-Prefeito Walter Braido.

	Disused railways	
Ypiranga toward Jundiaí	Trunk line The São Paulo Railway Company	Utinga toward Santos
Tamanduateí toward Luz	Line D-Beige; CPTM	Utinga toward Paranapiacaba
