= Line 10 (CPTM) =

Line 10 (Turquoise)
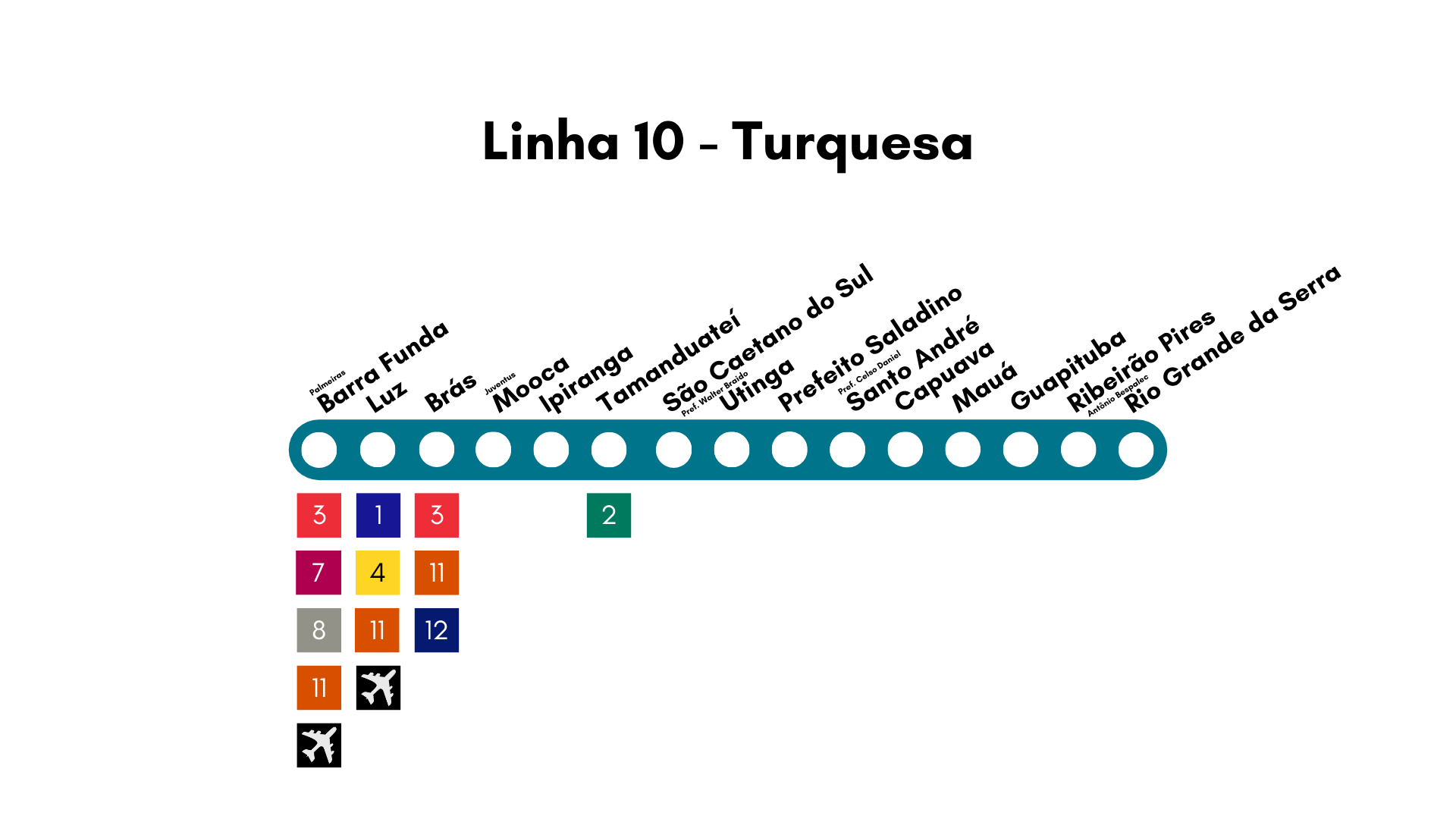

Overview
- Status: Operational
- Owner: Government of the State of São Paulo
- Locale: Greater São Paulo, Brazil
- Termini: Palmeiras–Barra Funda; Rio Grande da Serra
- Connecting lines: Current: Future: Planned: 16 19 20
- Stations: 15 in operation 4 in project

Service
- Type: Commuter rail
- System: São Paulo Metropolitan Trains
- Services: Palmeiras–Barra Funda ↔ Rio Grande da Serra; Tamanduateí ↔ Santo André (Express Line 10)
- Operator(s): CPTM
- Depot(s): Roosevelt rail yard
- Rolling stock: 36 CAF 2100 Series (1 train (L129), Line 10 Express only); 280 CAF 8500 Series (35 trains); 240 Hyundai Rotem 9500 Series (30 trains)

History
- Opened: 16 February 1867; 159 years ago (Note: As part of São Paulo Railway)

Technical
- Line length: 35 km (22 mi)
- Character: At-grade
- Track gauge: 1,600 mm (5 ft 3 in)
- Electrification: Overhead line, 3,000 V DC
- Operating speed: 90 km/h (56 mph)
- Signalling: Automatic block signaling

Line 10 (Turquoise) (Portuguese: Linha 10 – Turquesa), formerly Line D (Beige), is one of the thirteen lines that make up the São Paulo Metro Rail Transport Network in Brazil and one of the five lines operated by CPTM.

== Stations ==
Code	Station	Platforms	Position	Connections	City
BFU	Palmeiras-Barra Funda	Island platforms	At-grade	Barra Funda Bus Terminal; Barra Funda Road Terminal	São Paulo
LUZ	Luz	Island and side platforms	At-grade	Touristic Express	São Paulo
BAS	Brás	Island and side platforms	At-grade	Brás Bus Terminal	São Paulo
MOC	Juventus-Mooca	Side platforms	At-grade	-	São Paulo
IPG	Ipiranga	Side platforms	At-grade	(Planned) (Planned)	São Paulo
TMD	Tamanduateí	Island platforms	At-grade	BRT ABC (Future)	São Paulo
SCT	São Caetano do Sul-Prefeito Walter Braido	Side and island platforms	At-grade	São Caetano Bus Terminal; São Caetano Road Terminal	São Caetano do Sul
UTG	Utinga	Side platforms	At-grade	-	Santo André
PSA	Prefeito Saladino	Side platforms	At-grade	Prefeito Saladino Bus Terminal; Santo André Road Terminal	Santo André
SAN	Prefeito Celso Daniel-Santo André	Side and island platforms	At-grade	20 (Planned); Touristic Express; East Santo André Metropolitan Terminal; West Santo André Metropolitan Terminal; São Mateus–Jabaquara Metropolitan Corridor	Santo André
CPV	Capuava	Side platforms	At-grade	-	Mauá
MAU	Mauá	Side platforms	At-grade	Mauá Bus Terminal	Mauá
GPT	Guapituba	Side platforms	At-grade	-	Mauá
RPI	Ribeirão Pires-Antônio Bespalec	Side platforms	At-grade	Ribeirão Pires Bus Terminal; Ribeirão Pires Road Terminal	Ribeirão Pires
RGS	Rio Grande da Serra	Side platforms	At-grade	-	Rio Grande da Serra

== Trains ==
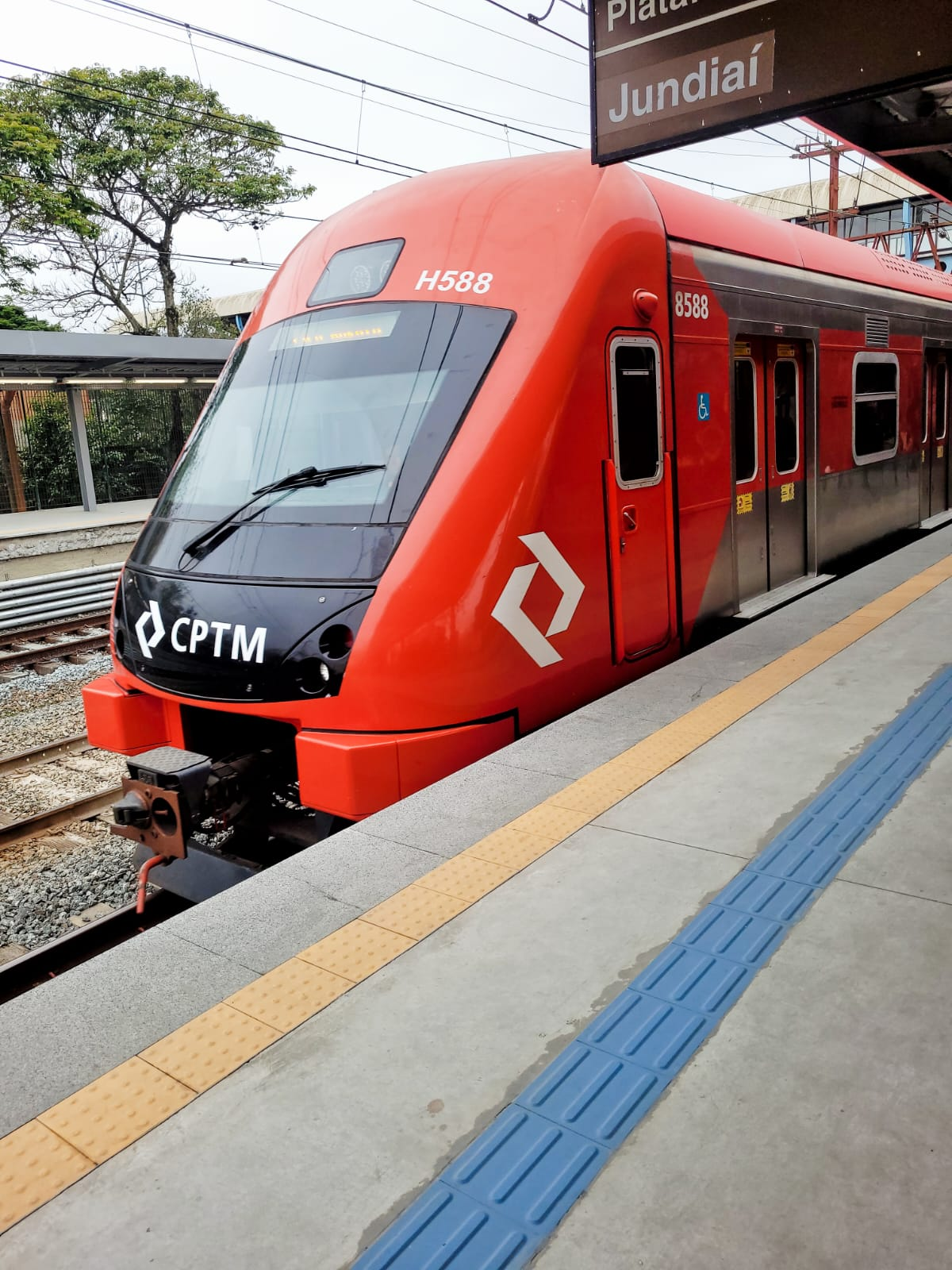
8500 Series at Prefeito Saladino station

As of August 2023, most trains running at this line are part of the 8500 and 9500 Series, created by CAF and Hyundai Rotem, respectively, given the unification of the line with Line 7 - Ruby, by the 710 Service, inaugurated in 2021.

Initially, most trains running at this line were part of the 2100 Series (Originally called CAF 440). Imported from Spain, this model was projected to take long journeys; therefore, they now only run at the ABC Express, that works at peak-hours between Tamanduateí and Santo André stations. 2100's compositions have only six cars, as opposed of the eight-cars regular compositions.

== See also ==
- Santos-Jundiaí Railroad
- Line 7 (CPTM)
