= Estádio Anacleto Campanella =

Football stadium in Brazil

- Anacleto Campanella
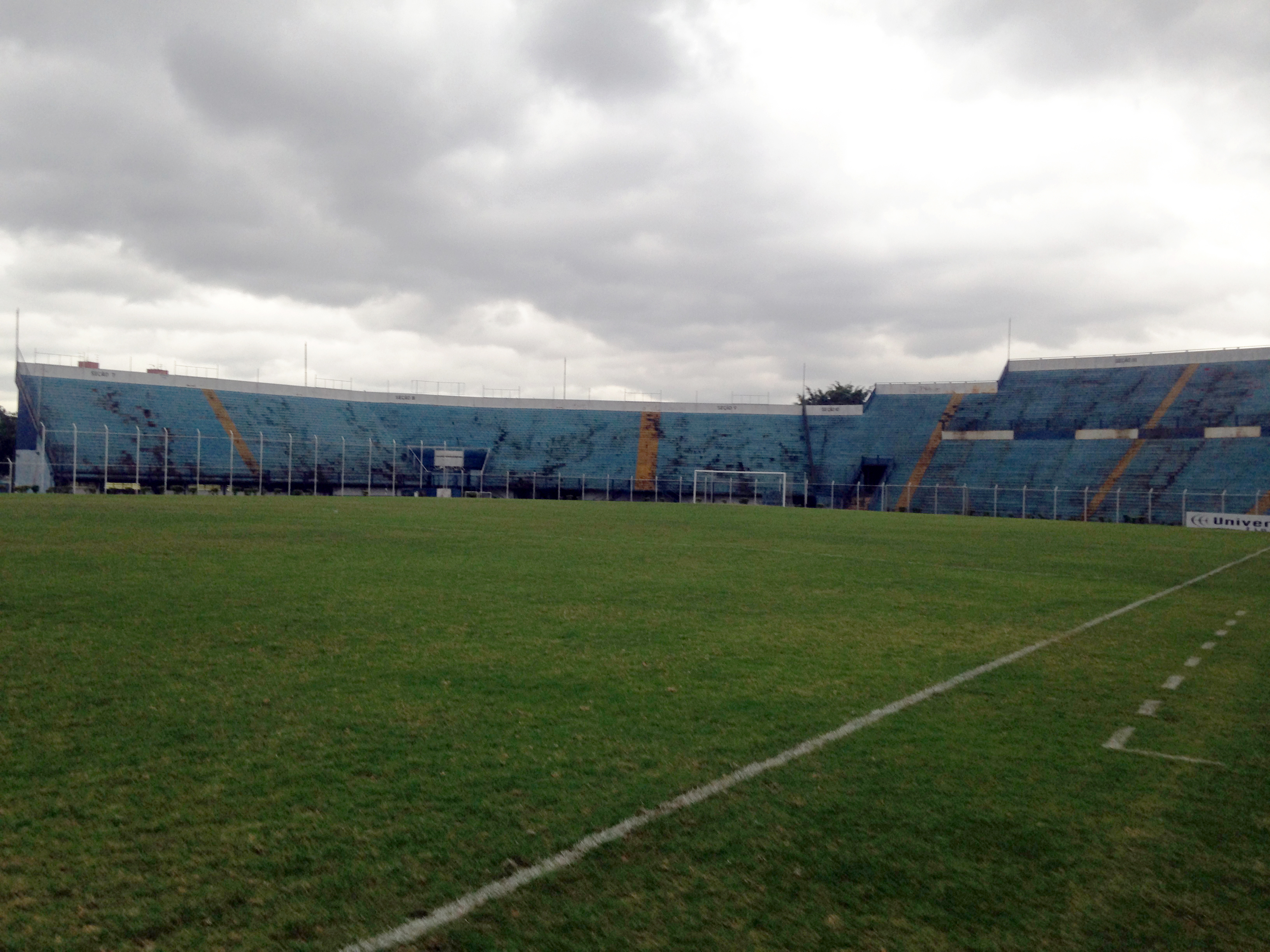
- Sisbrace
- Interactive map of Estádio Anacleto Campanella
- Full name: Estádio Municipal Anacleto Campanella
- Former names: Estádio Municipal Lauro Gomes de Almeida (short "Lauro Gomes")
- Location: São Caetano do Sul, São Paulo state, Brazil
- Coordinates: 23°37′48.42″S 46°33′35.55″W
- Owner: Municipality of São Caetano do Sul
- Capacity: 16,744
- Surface: Natural grass
- Field size: 105 by 68 metres (114.8 yd × 74.4 yd)
- Public transit: Utinga

Construction
- Opened: January 2, 1955
- Renovated: 1989, 2007, 2008, 2015, 2018

Tenant
- São Caetano

Estádio Municipal Anacleto Campanella, usually simply Estádio Anacleto Campanella - between 1964 and 1989 known as Estádio Municipal Lauro Gomes de Almeida, or for short Lauro Gomes, is an association football stadium in São Caetano do Sul, on the outskirts of São Paulo, Brazil. The stadium holds 16,744 people. It was inaugurated in 1955. The stadium is owned by the Municipality of São Caetano do Sul, and its formal name honors Anacleto Campanella, who was São Caetano do Sul's mayor from 1953 to 1957, and from 1961 to 1965.

== History ==
São Catano football club, Associação Atlética São Bento, created by the fusion of São Caetano Esporte Clube and Comercial Futebol Clube (a club from São Paulo city) in 1954 and not to be confused with other clubs of the same name, acquired a groundplot at Monte Alegre Novo where the stadium construction was completed in 1955. The inaugural match was played on January 2, 1955, when São Bento defeated XV de Piracicaba 1–0 with a goal by Gilmar.

After two seasons, São Bento was relegated to the Campeonato Paulista second division folded before the end of the decade. Afterward, the stadium was managed by the Municipal Prefecture of São Caetano do Sul. From 1961 to ca. 2008 – when the club moved to Campo Grande (MS) - the stadium was the home ground of Saad EC, which played two seasons in the first state division in the 1970s. The women's side of the club won there between 1989 and 2003 three national championships.

On July 28, 1964, the stadium was renamed to Lauro Gomes de Almeida, after a local politician. In 1989, the stadium was reformed again, returning to its previous name, Anacleto Campanella, and two matches were played on its reinauguration on May 7 of that year. In the first match, Associação Atlética São Caetano and Ribeirãopirense Futebol Clube drew 3–3. In the second match, a Brazilian team formed by veteran players defeated a São Caetano do Sul city team 2–0.

Since 1991 AD São Caetano founded in 1989 and Copa Libertadores finalist of 2002, uses the stadium as its home ground. On December 23, 2001, the second leg of the Campeonato Brasileiro Série A final was played at Estádio Anacleto Campanella. Atlético Paranaense beat AD São Caetano 1–0, and won the competition.

In 1999 and 2000, the stadium was modernized, with the bleachers being expanded, and the field being reformed. The stadium's attendance record currently stands at 19,805 people, set on December 9, 2001 when AD São Caetano beat Atlético Mineiro 2–1.
