= Ribeirão Pires-Antônio Bespalec (CPTM) =

Railway station in São Paulo, Brazil

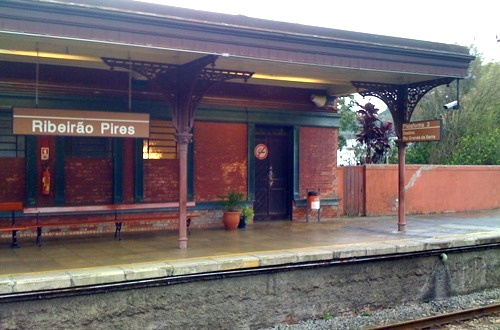
- View of the platform in Ribeirão Pires station in August 2012

General information
- Location: R. Capitão José Galo, s/n Center; Brazil
- Coordinates: 23.713848°S 46.414763°W
- Owner: Government of the State of São Paulo
- Operator: CPTM
- Platforms: Side platforms
- Connections: Ribeirão Pires Bus Terminal; Ribeirão Pires Road Terminal

Construction
- Structure type: At-grade

Other information
- Station code: RPI

History
- Opened: 1 March 1883
- Former names: Ribeirão Pires

Services
Preceding station	São Paulo Metropolitan Trains	Following station
Guapituba towards Palmeiras-Barra Funda	Line 10	Rio Grande da Serra Terminus
Track layout
Location

Ribeirão Pires-Antônio Bespalec is a train station on CPTM Line 10 (Turquoise), located in the city of Ribeirão Pires.

== History ==
On 28 June 1861, Antonio José de Moraes sold part of Sítio Ribeirão dos Pires to the railway. This, in turn, had belonged to José Alves Siqueira, who died in 1845, and his widow Francisca Alves Bicudo. It was in this area where later the warehouse and the station were built. On 16 February 1867, with connection São Paulo–Santos to the railway, it inaugurated the temporary traffic, being the current city of Ribeirão Pires a strategical point of stop for water supply of the steam locomotives. The railway branch has already been projected in 1862 by engineer Daniel Makinson Fox the idealizer of the tilted surfaces of the mountain range. The idealized track is the same of the existing one connecting Rio Grande da Serra to Mogi das Cruzes, passing through Ribeirão Pires, branch still active of cargo transportation.

But Ribeirão Pires station was opened only on 1 March 1885. The station worked next to the current one, in a still existing building, the Warehouse. Around the station there were already some Italian immigrants, but the residents were mostly German and the activities that predominated were potteries and wood extraction, but created, in February 1887, the Italian Immigrants Colony.

The village around the station grew a lot, and became a city in 1953. Just like Rio Grande da Serra, the station is the same since the beginning of the century. Today, the CPTM commuter trains attend it.

In 2013, the station was renamed to Ribeirão Pires–Antônio Bespalec after Antônio Bespalec, architect, urbanist, and Secretary of Environment during the administration of former Mayor Clóvis Volpi. Bespalec died in 2008.

	Disused railways	
Guapituba toward Jundiaí	Trunk line The São Paulo Railway Company	Rio Grande toward Santos
Guapituba toward Luz	Line D-Beige; CPTM	Rio Grande da Serra toward Paranapiacaba
