= Tamanduateí (CPTM) =

Railway station in São Paulo, Brazil

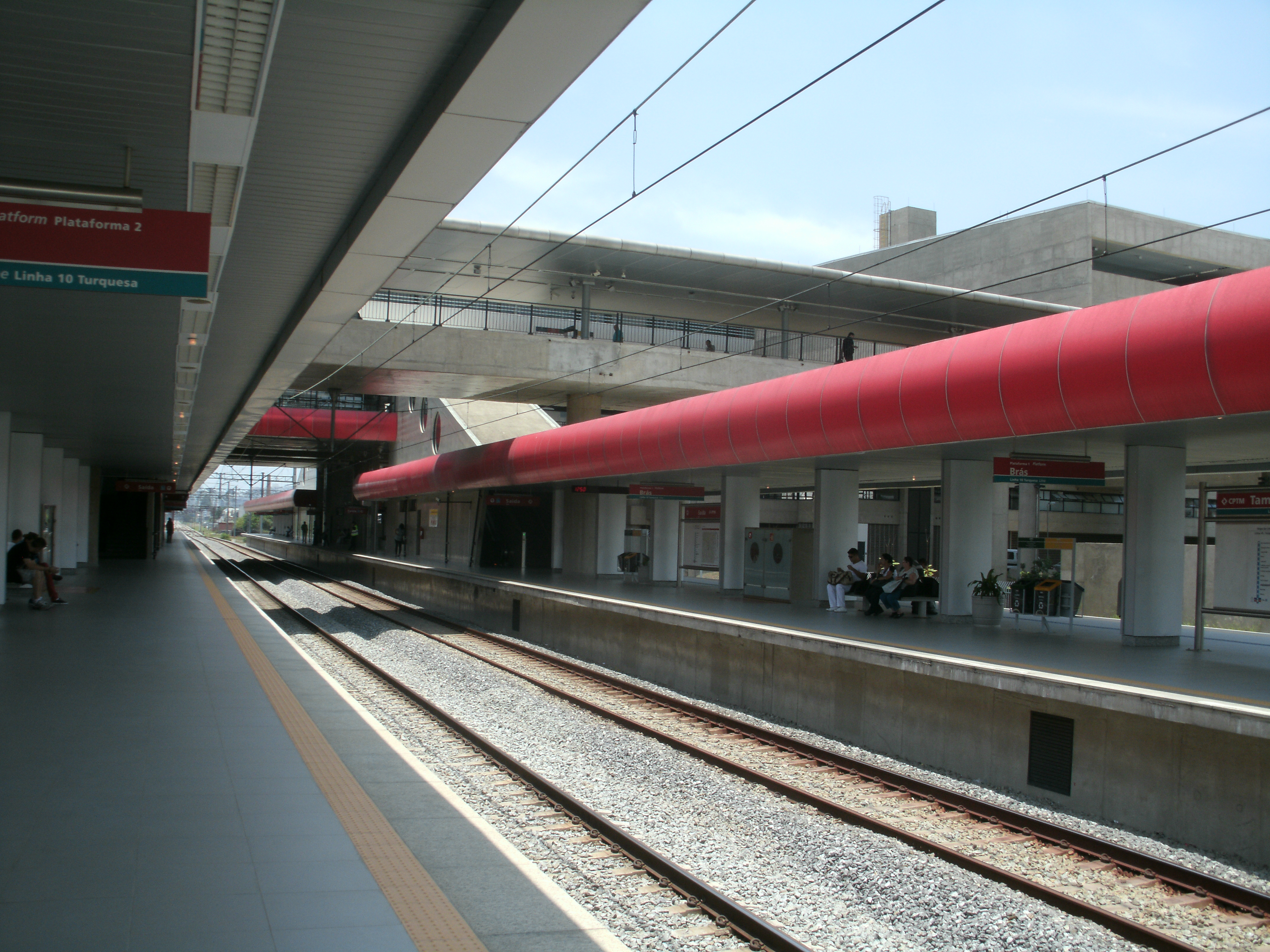
- Station platform

General information
- Location: R. Guamiranga, 750; Ipiranga; Brazil
- Coordinates: 23.59447°S 46.587932°W
- Owner: Government of the State of São Paulo
- Operator: CPTM
- Platforms: Island platforms
- Connections: BRT ABC (future)

Construction
- Structure type: At-grade

Other information
- Station code: TMD

History
- Opened: 25 October 1947
- Rebuilt: 21 September 2010
- Former names: Vemag; Studebaker

Services
| Preceding station | São Paulo Metropolitan Trains | Following station |
|---|---|---|
| Ipiranga towards Palmeiras-Barra Funda | Line 10 | São Caetano do Sul-Pref. Walter Braido towards Rio Grande da Serra |
| Terminus | Express Line 10 | São Caetano do Sul-Pref. Walter Braido towards Pref. Celso Daniel-Santo André |
Out-of-system interchange
| Preceding station | São Paulo Metro | Following station |
|---|---|---|
| Sacomã towards Vila Madalena | Line 2 transfer at Tamanduateí | Vila Prudente towards Penha |
Track layout
Location

Tamanduateí, formerly Studebaker/Vemag Stop, is a train station on CPTM Line 10-Turquoise, with connection to São Paulo Metro Line 2-Green. It's located between districts Ipiranga and Vila Prudente, in the neighbour hood of Vila Independência, in São Paulo.

== History ==
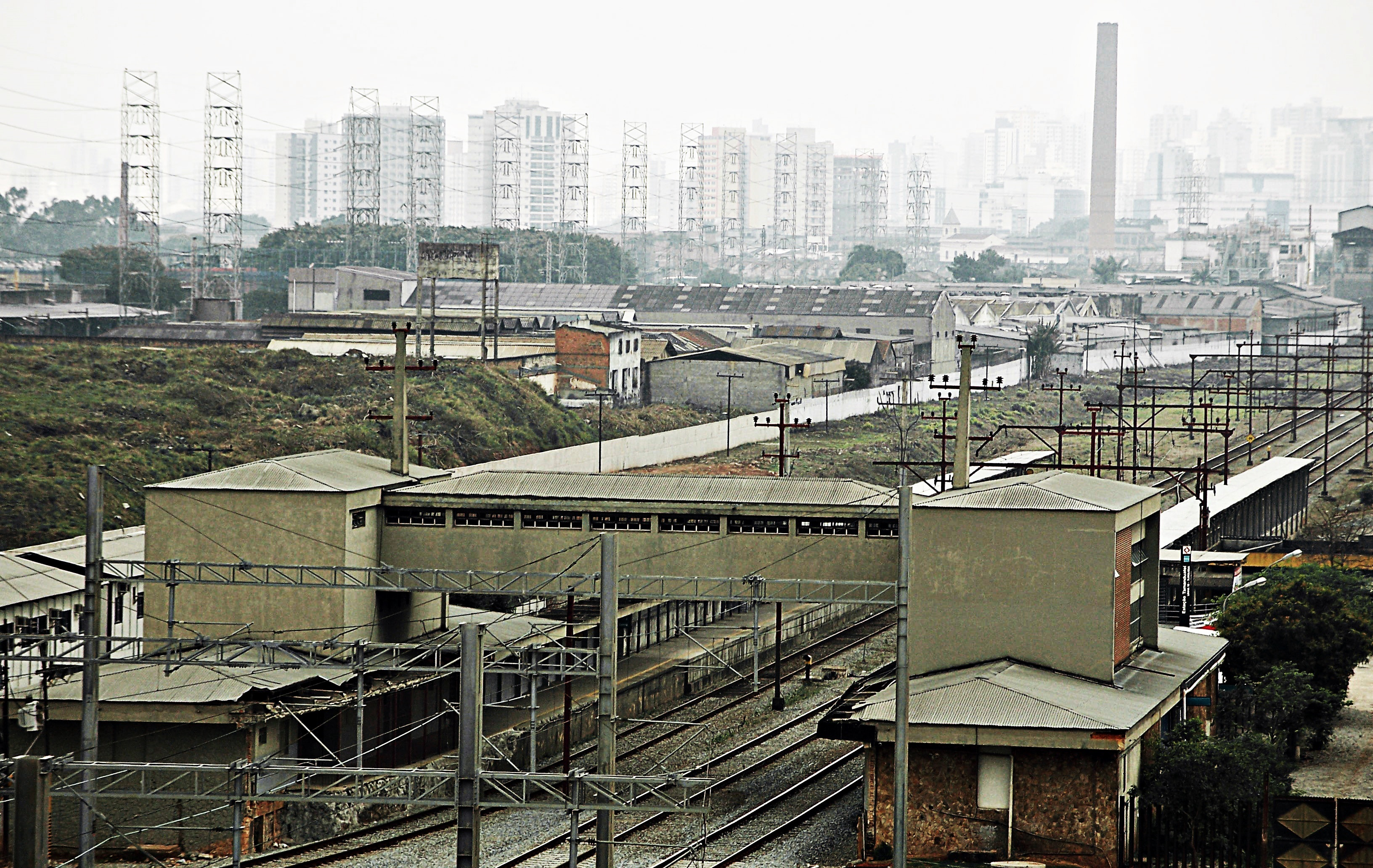
Original station

After World War II, Brazil started to encourage the nationalization of automotive industry. Therefore, the state of São Paulo was the destination of many multinational companies from the automotive branch. These companies, taking advantage of Anchieta Highway and Santos-Jundiaí Railway, getting installed in the surroundings of these corridors, most notably in the ABC zone. The Distribuidora de Automóveis Studebaker Ltda., founded in 1945, was installed next to the km 70 of the Santos Jundiaí Railway, between São Caetano and Ipiranga stations, and dedicated itself initially to vehicle mounting of the American homonymous and other like Studebaker, Massey Harris, Scania Vabis, Kenworths and Ferguson in regime SDK/CKD. The production growth motivated the hiring of many workers, whose mobility was difficult because of the distance between the factory and Ipiranga station. Motivated by the increasing demand originated by the factory, Santos-Jundiaí created the Studebaker Stop, made of two side platforms and used only in the entrance and exit times of the factory. Despite the stop was in the time table of Santos-Jundiaí, it didn't appear in the maps until 1964, when it was promoted to the category of station.

In the 1950s, Studebaker was renamed to Veículos e Máquinas Agrícolas S.A. (Vemag) and started a process of conversion of its industrial plant to be the automobile manufacturer under licence of the German company DKW. Vemag's growth attracted dozens of small industries suppliers of auto parts, lubricants, and fuel, consolidating that region as an industrial area. Therefore, the small stop became used more, until it was promoted to the condition of regular passengers station, in 1964, when new installations were opened.

After Vemag's closing in 1967, Vemag station was renamed to Tamanduateí, though the old name was made by the companies in the zone and by the media until mid-1970s. Since its creation, the station suffered from flooding of Tamanduateí River, which stops the train traffic sometimes. Slowly, the installation of the station became outdated and didn't attend the modern accessibility rules, being predicted the station remodeling.

=== Rebuilt ===
The original Tamanduateí station was deactivated on 21 September 2010, being replaced by the current one, built 100 metres (330 ft) away from the old station. With the construction of the new train and metro station, the old building was demolished. The new station was built to attend the CPTM Line 10-Turquoise, as well as the Metro Line 2-Green, with the Metro platforms being elevated. A proposal made by State Deputy Edson Ferrarini (PROS) was published to rename the station to Tamanduateí-Imperador do Ipiranga, but then-Governor Alberto Goldman vetoed the project and the Legislative Assembly confirmed the veto, archiving the project.

=== Infrastructure problems ===
Five months after the station opening, it already presented five gutters, being one in the CPTM platform and two in the Metro area. The company stated that the repair would be made by the builder, without burden. Local residents heard by Jornal da Tarde in April 2011 complained about the supposed neglect to the surroundings of the station, as the desert region facilitated robbery. Metro responded to the complaints saying that there was project of the reurbanization of the area, and the reform was scheduled to start in the second semester of 2011.

On 15 December 2011, the surroundings of the station were flooded, due to the overflow of Tamanduateí River. In the occasion, employees who arrived to work were obligated to go to Vila Prudente station, where they would take the metro to Tomanduateí. According to an employee heard by Jornal da Tarde, the water had reached the escalators in the Avenida Presidente Wilson entrance. Passengers who arrived to the station needed to wait for the water level to decrease and, even after this happened, had to deal with much mud throughout that day. The Metro directory emphasized that the station operation wasn't interrupted, because it was projected above the region flooding quota, that has "cronichal problems with floodings". One of these measures predicted a reinforcement in the surface water draining, but it's enough only if the river doesn't flood.

== Characteristics ==
The station is located between Avenida Presidente Wilson and Rua Guamiranga, having access to both roads. The Metro station is elevated with side platforms, while the CPTM one is a surface station with two island platforms. Its mezzanine is common to both Metro and CPTM.

| | Disused railways | |
|---|---|---|
| Ipiranga toward Luz | Line D-Beige; CPTM | São Caetano toward Paranapiacaba |
