= Robert Sharpe (railway contractor) =

Railway contractor (1804–1868)

- Born: 16 September 1804; Grindon, County Durham, England
- Died: 25 July 1868 (aged 63); Addlestone, Surrey, England
- Resting place: West Hoathly, Sussex
- Occupation: Railway Contractor
- Years active: 1837-1864
- Era: Victorian
- Notable work: Construction of the São Paulo Railway, Brazil

Robert Sharpe (1804-1868) was a contractor on railway projects in England, Wales and Brazil. He was also a noted farmer and stockbreeder on his estate, Hewelsfield Court, in Gloucestershire.

He was born in Grindon, County Durham, England in 1804. He and his brothers John and Paul were later engaged in various railway works in England and Wales including Whiteball Tunnell on the Bristol and Exeter Railway, the South Devon Railway and the South Wales Railway. Robert Sharpe also completed works for Gloucester and Deane Forest Railway, Cornwall Railway and the Great Western Railway.

In 1851, Robert had a steam powered flour and grist mill built in Chepstow, between the gas works and the railway embankment. He ran the mill in partnership with Mr. James Ireland, a cornfactor and miller from Bristol, under the name The Chepstow Steam Mill Company. The firm was successful for a number of years, but was sold in 1863 after running into difficulties.

On 8 February 1860, Robert Sharpe & Sons (a partnership between Robert and his two sons Paul Wallace and William John) signed a contract with the San Paulo Railway Company, to build a line between Santos and Jundiahy, via São Paulo, for the agreed sum of £1,745,000. On 1 October 1866 the railway was completed, handed over to and accepted by the company.

Robert Sharpe died on 25 July 1868 at Addlestone, Chertsey, Surrey, aged sixty four. He was buried at St. Margarets, West Hoathly.

== Chancery Court of Appeal: Sharpe v. San Paulo Railway ==
In 1871 Paul Wallace Sharpe and William John Sharpe attempted to sue San Paulo Railway to recover additional costs of £617,143 which they had incurred when the company's engineer had altered the plans from the original specification. The case reached the Chancery Court of Appeal in 1872, but was thrown out. Lord Romilly and Sir W. M. James stated that if the contractors had disapproved of the new arrangements, they ought to have entered into a fresh contract with the company. It was clear, they said, that the engineer had no power to alter the contract, and that the verbal agreement between him and contractor could not bind the company. Shortly after this, the company Robert Sharpe & Sons was dissolved.

== Bibliography ==
- Minutes of Proceedings of the Institution of Civil Engineers. Vol. XXX. London: Institution of Civil Engineers. 1870. pp. 29–77.
