= Avança Brasil =

The Advance Brazil Program (Portuguese: Programa Avança Brasil) was a federal infrastructure program under the Cardoso administration. The program had an estimated budget of $43 billion and was planned to be implemented from 2000 to 2020. The program was replaced by the Programa de Aceleração do Crescimento (Growth Acceleration Program) under the Lula da Silva and Rousseff administrations.
