= Estrada de Ferro Santos-Jundiaí =

Brazilian railway company (1948–1969)

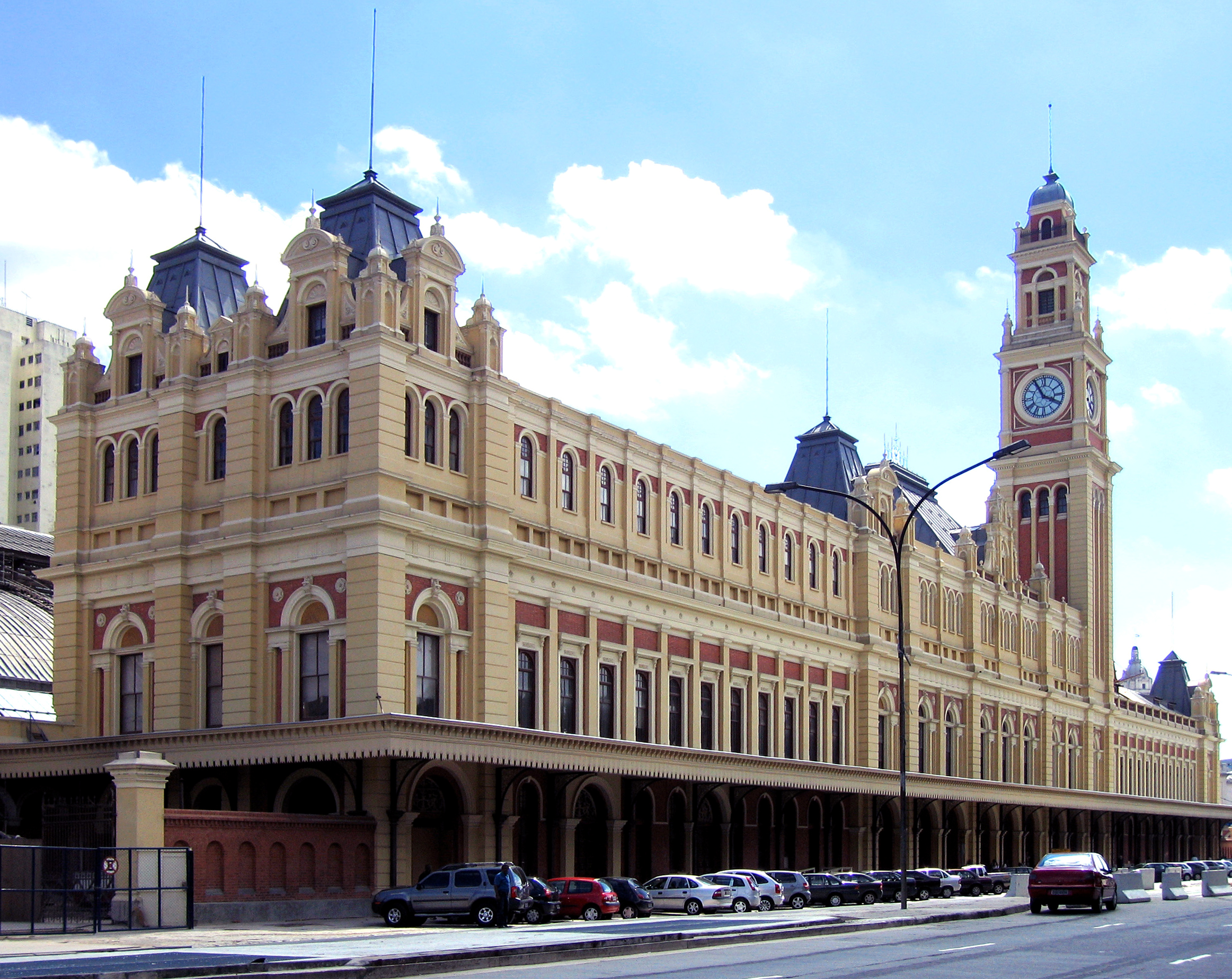
Estação da Luz, headquarters of São Paulo Railway at 2000's

Estrada de Ferro Santos-Jundiaí was a 1,600 mm (5 ft 3 in) gauge railway line in São Paulo, Brazil.

On 13 September 1946, the São Paulo Railway was nationalised by the federal government, and passed to be managed by the Brazilian Ministry of Transportation and Public Works (Portuguese: Ministério da Viação e Obras Públicas). In 1948 it was renamed Estrada de Ferro Santos-Jundiaí and in 1957 became part of Rede Ferroviária Federal, S.A. (RFFSA). It was incorporated by RFFSA in 1969.

In the 1970s, the haulage system was replaced by a three blade abt system which was installed by the Japanese firm Marubeni. The locomotives for this changeover had been constructed by Hitachi. New locomotives (7) were ordered in 2010 from the Swiss manufacturer Stadler Rail. The rack-and-pinion locomotives are supposed to be the most powerful ever built, with over 5000 kW of power they develop 760 kN of tractive force. The first unit is already undergoing testing as of June 2012. The first two units should be shipped of to Brazil by fall in order to undergo testing on the track before the end of the year.

== See also ==
- Santos
- Jundiaí
