= Programa de Aceleração do Crescimento =

Growth Acceleration Program
- Portuguese: Novo Programa de Aceleração do Crescimento, Novo PAC
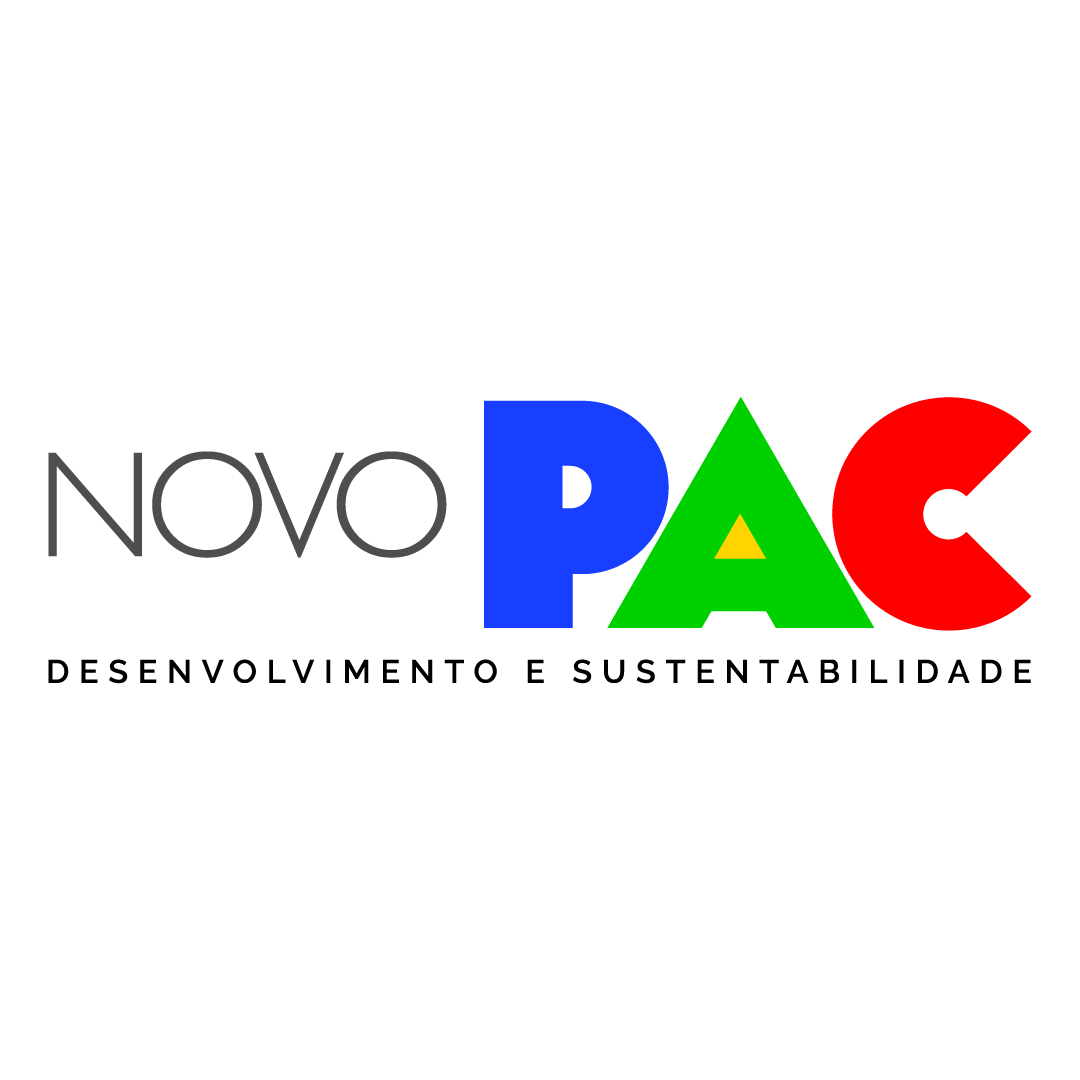

Development program overview
- Formed: 28 January 2007; 19 years ago
- Preceding agencies: PAC; PAC 2
- Jurisdiction: Federal government of Brazil
- Motto: Portuguese: Desenvolvimento e sustentabilidade
- Annual budget: R$60 billion
- Development program executive: Luiz Inácio Lula da Silva, President of Brazil
- Website: https://www.gov.br/casacivil/pt-br/novopac

The Programa de Aceleração do Crescimento (Growth Acceleration Program), better known as PAC, is a major infrastructure program of the Federal government of Brazil. The program was launched on January 28, 2007, by the Lula da Silva administration, consisting of a set of economic policies and investment projects with the objective of accelerating economic growth in Brazil. The program had a budget of $503.9 billion reais for the 2007-2010 quadriennium. The money pledged to be spent on this program was to be around R$ 500 billion (US $260 billion) over four years. However, by 2010 many projects remained mired in bureaucracy, and only 11% of the projects outlined in the plan had been completed, while just over half had not even been launched.

The Rousseff administration continued the program under the name PAC-2. Following the 2022 Brazilian general election, Luiz Inácio Lula da Silva reformed the program under the name Novo PAC, having a total investment of R$1.7 trillion, with R$1.3 trillion being invested by 2026.

== Program structure ==
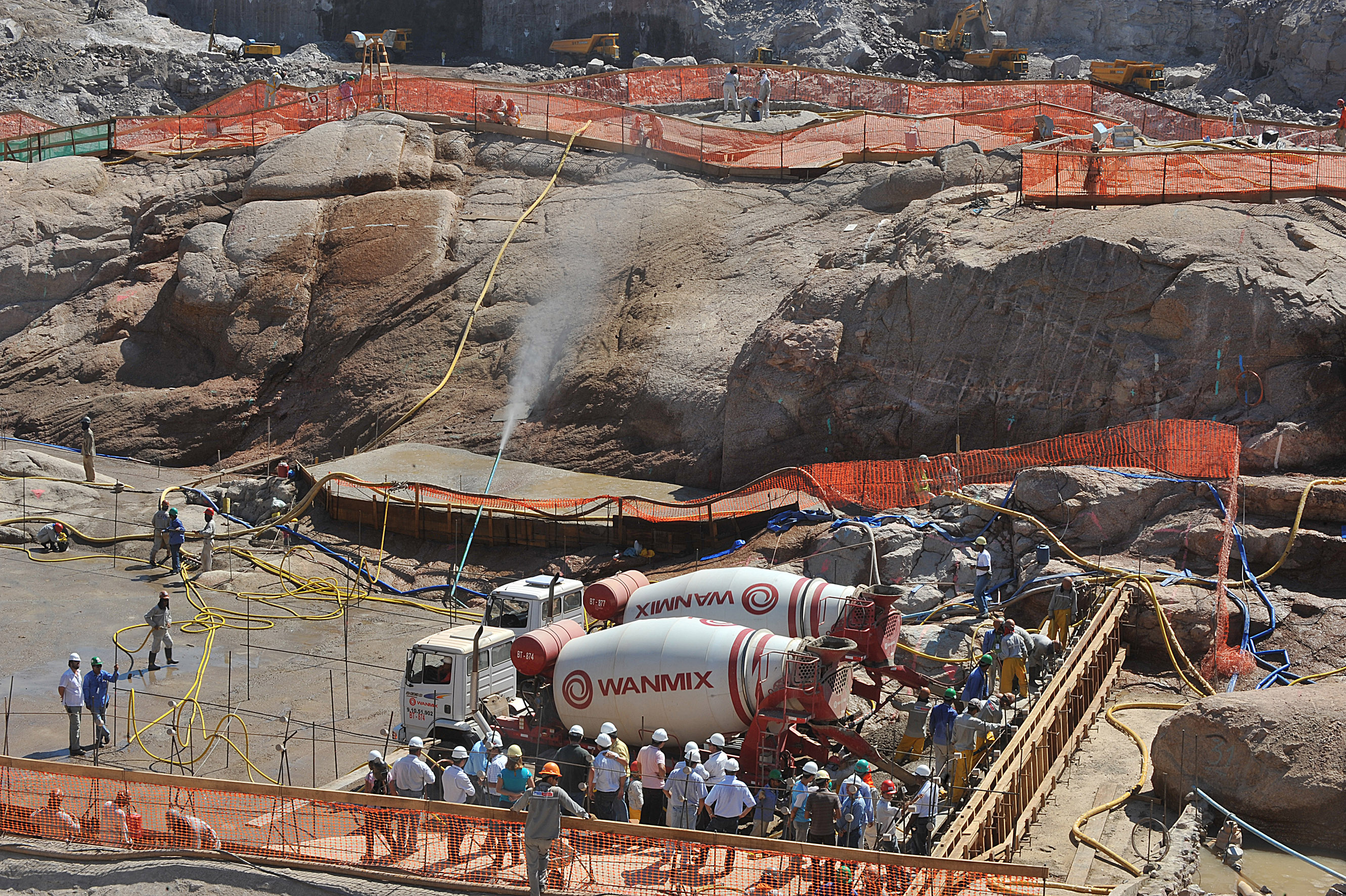
Construction work, with PAC funds, of the future Santo Antônio Dam, in Rondônia.

The Growth Acceleration Program forecasts investments by the Federal government, state enterprises and the private sector in construction, sanitation, energy, transport and logistics. The program had an estimated budget of $503.9 billion reais for the 2007–2010 quadriennium. The money pledged to be spent on this program was to be around R$ 500 billion (US $260 billion) over four years. However, by 2010 many projects remained mired in bureaucracy, and only 11% of the projects outlined in the plan had been completed, while just over half had not even been launched.

== PAC 2 ==
PAC 2 was launched in March 2010 by President Dilma Rousseff. It was set up as a continuation of the original PAC, which was designed to last only four years. PAC 2 had a budget of R$1.59 trillion, and focused on the development of social and infrastructure sectors such as transportation, energy, health care, culture, and housing.

== New PAC ==
On 11 August 2023, the Federal government of Brazil launched the Novo PAC, having a total investment of R$1,68 trillion, with an estimated R$1,3 trillion being invested by 2026, with an annual investment of R$60 billion. The new program has a focus on investments in infrastructure and social areas such as healthcare, education, sustainability, and transportation.

== See also ==
- Avança Brasil
