= Rio Grande da Serra (CPTM) =

Railway station in São Paulo, Brazil

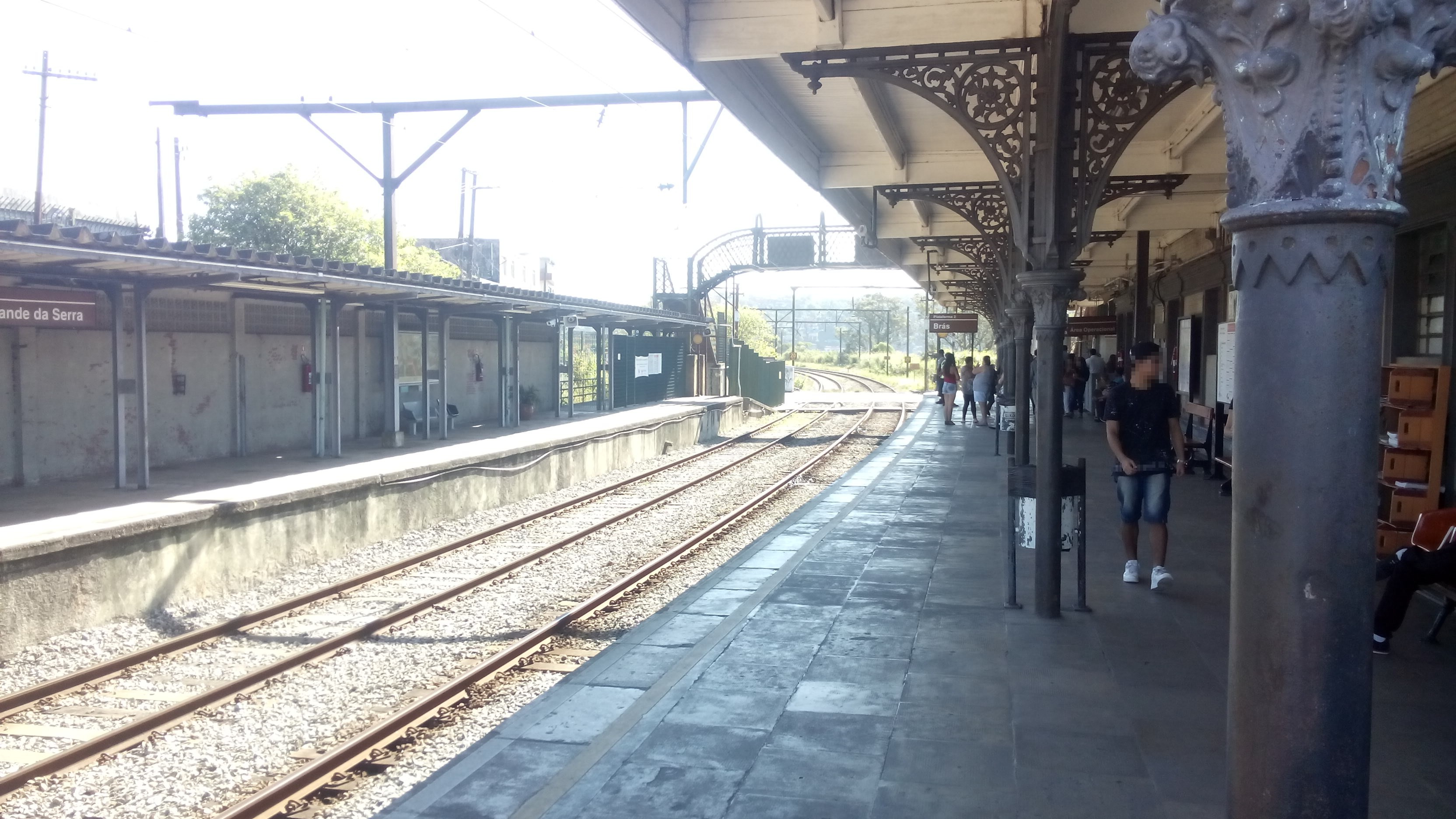
- View of both platforms of Rio Grande da Serra station in July 2017

General information
- Location: Estrada Guilherme Pinto Monteiro, s/n Jardim Maria Paula; Brazil
- Coordinates: 23.74351°S 46.391847°W
- Owner: Government of the State of São Paulo
- Operator: CPTM
- Platforms: Side platforms

Construction
- Structure type: At-grade

Other information
- Station code: RGS

History
- Opened: 16 February 1867
- Former names: Rio Grande; Icatuaçu

Services
Preceding station	São Paulo Metropolitan Trains	Following station
Ribeirão Pires-Antônio Bespalec towards Palmeiras-Barra Funda	Line 10	Terminus
Track layout
Location

Rio Grande da Serra is a train station on CPTM Line 10-Turquoise, located in the city of Rio Grande da Serra. Since 2002, is the terminus station of Line 10.

== History ==
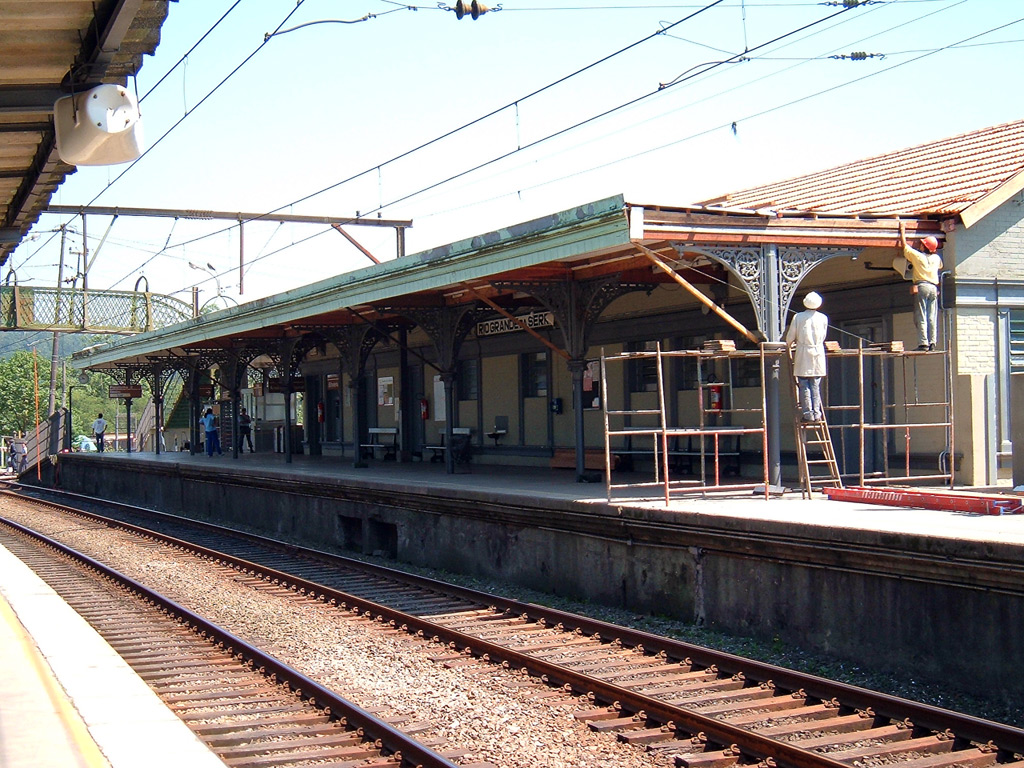
Small reform in the station in July 2005.

The station was opened as Rio Grande, built with wattle and daub and not tiled platform. Desert location at the time, was an intermediary station of water fueling for steam locomotives and train crossings. It was the second train station built in the state of São Paulo.

Rio Grande da Serra became a city in 1964, with the current name. Its station is still the same since the beginning of the century, well conserved. It works attending CPTM commuter trains, being the end of the line, as the track to Paranapiacaba don't receive trains anymore since 2002.

== Railroad Ring ==
The project of the Railway Outline of São Paulo Metropolitan Region considers Evangelista de Souza station as start point of the South Railroad Ring. The track will connect Ouro Fino Paulista, in Ribeiro Pires, to the Evangelista de Souza station, in Parelheiros, allowing the cargo trains cross the São Paulo Metropolitan Region, without interfering in the commuter transportation of CPTM.

	Disused railways	
Ribeirão Pires toward Jundiaí	Trunk line The São Paulo Railway Company	Eletrocloro; Deactivated toward Santos
Ribeirão Pires toward Luz	Line D-Beige; CPTM	Campo Grande; Deactivated toward Paranapiacaba
