= São Paulo Railway Company =

Railway company in Brazil

The São Paulo Railway Company, Limited

Overview
- Headquarters: São Paulo
- Reporting mark: SPR
- Locale: São Paulo, Brazil
- Dates of operation: 16 February 1867–13 September 1946
- Successor: EFSJ

Technical
- Track gauge: 1,600 mm (5 ft 3 in)
- Length: 139 km (86 mi)

The São Paulo Railway Company (SPR), nicknamed Ingleza, transl.: The English) was a privately owned British railway company in Brazil, which operated the 1,600 mm (5 ft 3 in) gauge railway from the seaport at Santos via São Paulo to Jundiaí. The company was nationalised in 1946 and became the Estrada de Ferro Santos-Jundiaí.

The São Paulo Railway consists of three parts:

- The 20 km (12 mi) long adhesion railway at the coast from Santos to Piaçaguera near Cubatão
- The 8 km (5 mi) long steep grade from Piaçaguera to Paranapiacaba
- The adhesion railway on the plateau from Paranapiacaba via São Paulo to Jundiaí

Three different systems were used to climb the steep grade between Piaçaguera and Paranapiacaba:

- A four-section cable railway with stationary steam engines, in use from 1867 until 1970, called Serra Velha, transl.: Old Mountain
- A five-section cable railway with stationary steam engines, in use from 1901 until 1982, called Serra Nova, transl.: New Mountain
- An electrified rack-and-adhesion railway built on the right of way of the abandoned Serra Velha opened in 1974, called Sistema Cremalheira-Aderência, transl.: System Rack-and-adhesion

== Planning ==
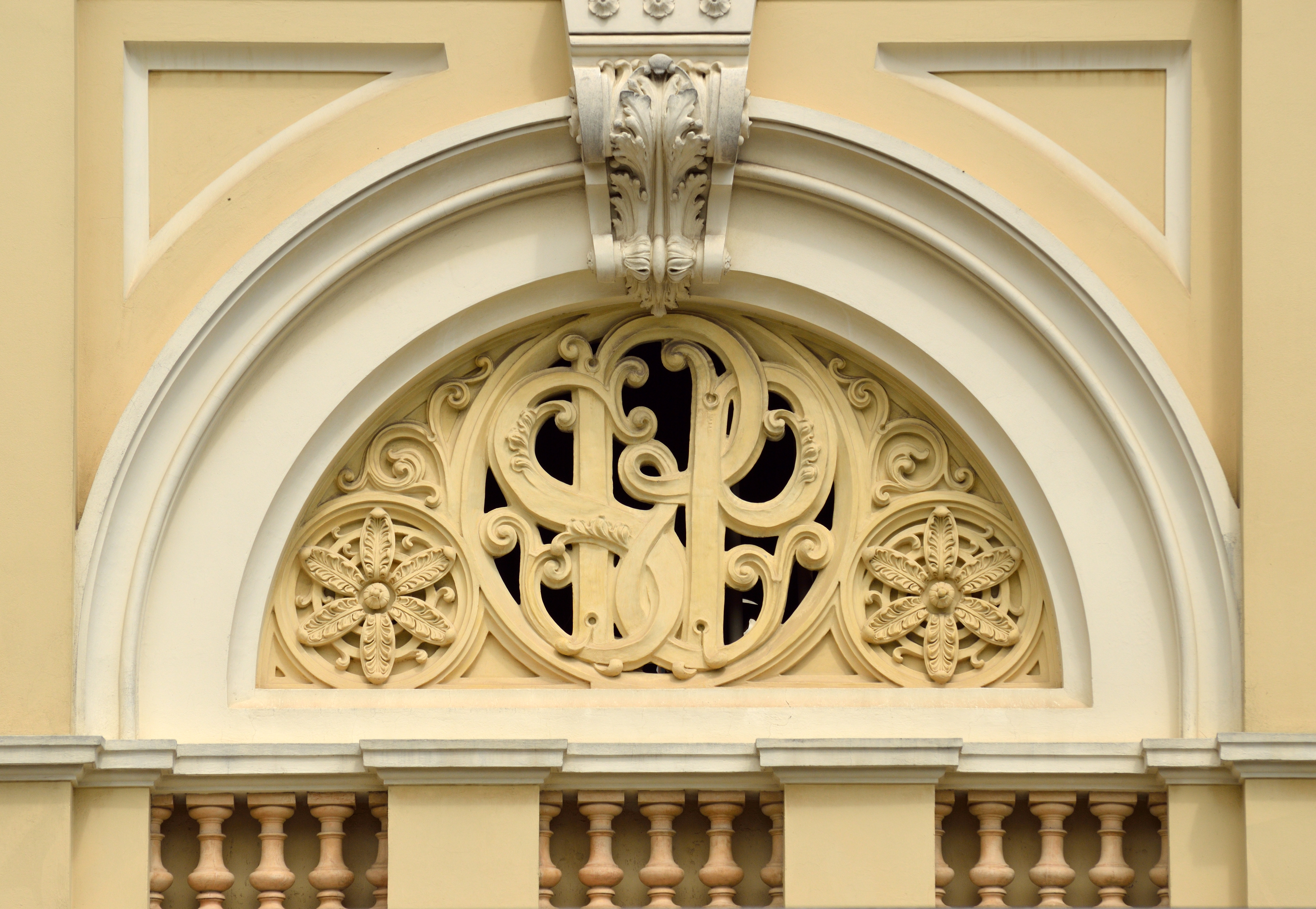
Monogram featuring the Company's initials in the Luz Station

In 1859, a group of people led by the Barão de Mauá convinced the Brazilian government that it was important to construct a railroad connecting São Paulo to the seaport at Santos. The main purpose of the project was the transport of the coffee grown on the inland plateau to the Atlantic coast for export. The biggest difficulty was the task to overcome the steep east slope of the 800-metre-high (2,600 ft) Serra do Mar, which was considered to be nearly impracticable. Therefore, Barão de Mauá asked Britain to clarify the feasibility of a railway line for locomotive hauled trains within a budget limit of £200,000. The greatest technician for this subject was consulted: Scottish railroad engineer James Brunlees.

Brunlees visited Brazil and considered that the project was feasible. He recommended engineer Daniel Makinson Fox to Barão de Mauá for the execution of the project. Fox was at that time only 26 years old but had already experience in the construction of railways through the mountains of northern Wales and the hillsides of the Pyrenees. He realised that the railway could only climb the slope in the Serra do Mar if a 5-mile-long (8 km) incline system was built. An adhesion railway would have used 26 miles (42 km) to overcome the slope and would have also overrun the £200,000 budget.

== Construction ==
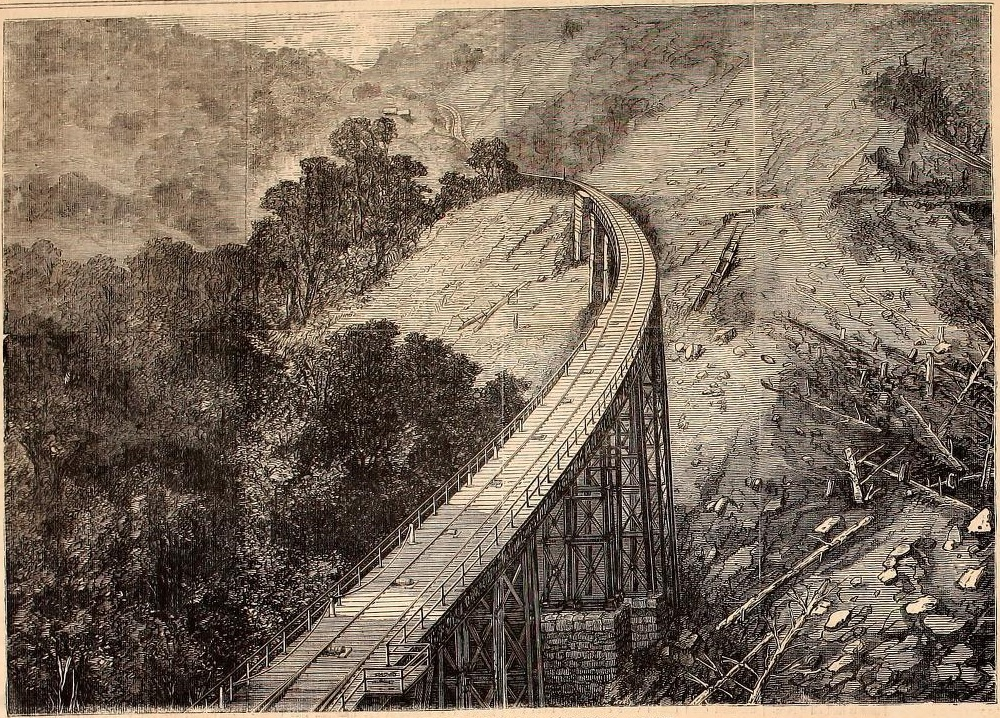
The Serra Viaduct, São Paulo's Railway, Brazil (Harper's Weekly, Vol. 12, No. 623, 1868)

Daniel Fox's proposal for the railway line from Santos to Jundiaí including the incline system was approved by Brunlees and the São Paulo Railway Company (SPR) was established to build the railway system and operate it for 90 years. Since the capital of the company was mainly British also the official company name was in English, not Portuguese. The railway company contracted with Robert Sharpe & Sons to acquire the land, execute the works and supply all rolling stock and plant.

Construction on the 20 km (12 mi) long adhesion railway Santos – Piaçaguera began on 15 March 1860 and on the incline system in 1861.

The road was constructed without explosives since it was felt that the slopes were very unstable. The rock was excavated only with plug and feathers. Embankments of 3 to 20 m (9.8 to 65.6 ft) in height were constructed to protect the tracks from the frequent torrential rains in the area, which used about 230,000-cubic-metre (300,000 cu yd) rocks. The line did not have any tunnels.

In spite of all the difficulties, the construction finished 10 months ahead of the date specified in the contract, which was eight years. The São Paulo Railway was opened on 16 February 1867.

== Serra Velha – the first incline system ==
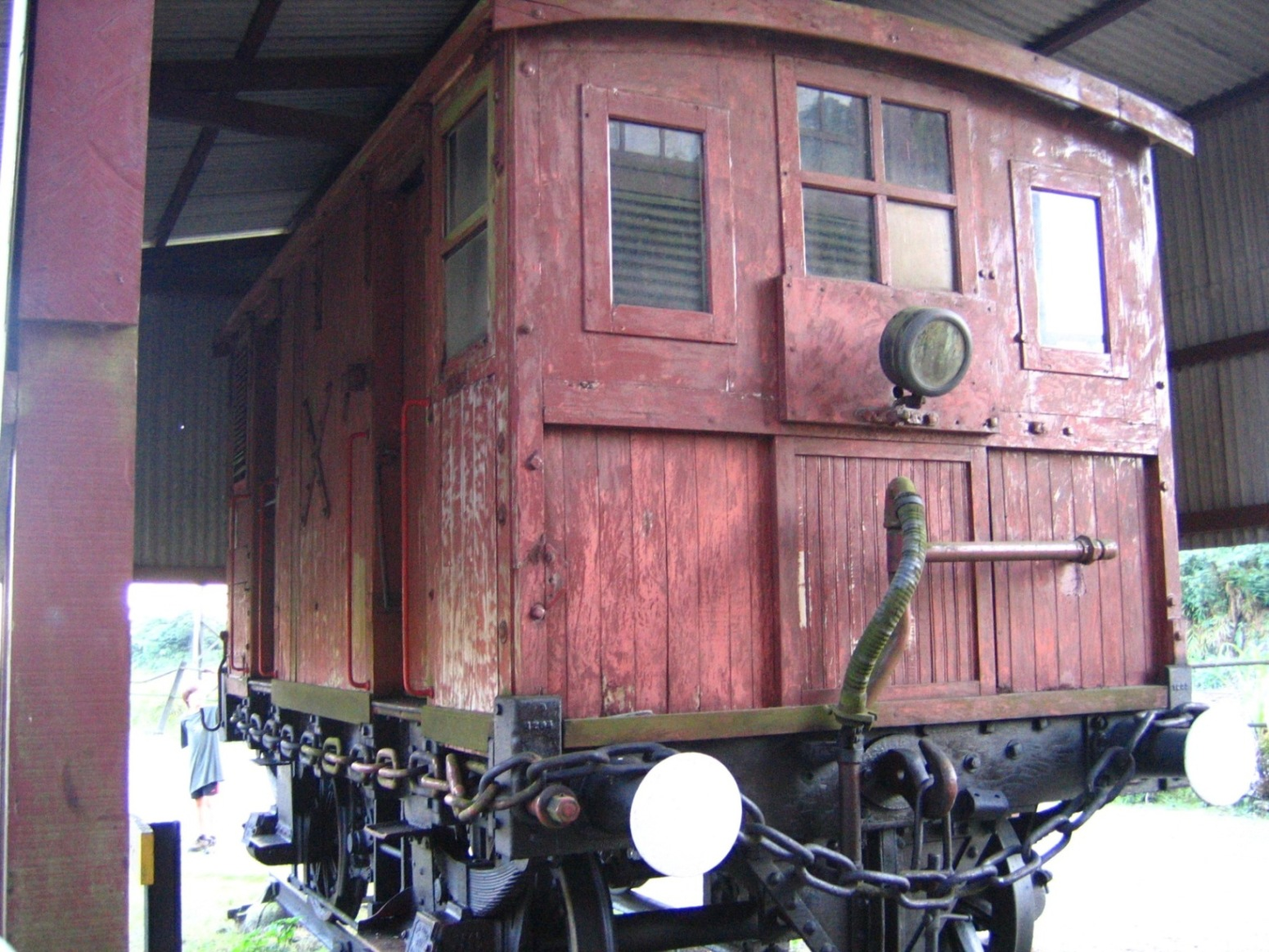
Brake van, which was used to attach the standard railway wagons to the cable of the Serra Velha incline system between Piaçaguera and Paranapiacaba

The part of the route climbing the Serra do Mar consisted of four 10.3% grade cable railway sections with the following lengths:

- section 1: 1,781 metres (5,843 ft)
- section 2: 1,947 metres (6,388 ft)
- section 3: 2,096 metres (6,877 ft)
- section 4: 3,139 metres (10,299 ft)

At each section the wagons were attached to a steel wire rope with the help of a specially fitted brake van called Serrabreque (transl.: Hill Brake). The steel cable was driven by a stationary steam winding engine at the top end of the section, where a 75-metre (246 ft) extension with a 1.3% grade was also fitted, so that the wagons could be led to the next section.

The incline system was later called Serra Velha (transl.: Old Mountain) to distinguish it from the later built second incline system called Serra Nova.

== Serra Nova – the second incline system ==
The large volume of coffee shipments and the growth of the cities in the São Paulo region required more transport capacity. Therefore, the construction of a second incline system started in 1895. The new line ran parallel to the already existing one in about two miles (3.2 km) distance. It had five sections using continuous steel wire ropes which were moved by stationary 1,000 hp (750 kW) steam engines. Each section was about 2,000 metres (6,600 ft) long and had a grade of 8%. Two to three wagons were coupled to the rope with the help of small locomotives fitted with grip engaging with the cable. These locomotives were also able to handle the wagons in the terminal station and between the sections so that the operation of the incline system was facilitated. The locomotives have been called Locobreque (transl.: Brake locomotives). In case the weight of the wagons to be lifted was too heavy compared to the wagons lowered at the same time, tank cars filled with water were used to counterbalance the system. The incline system was used in revenue service until 1982.

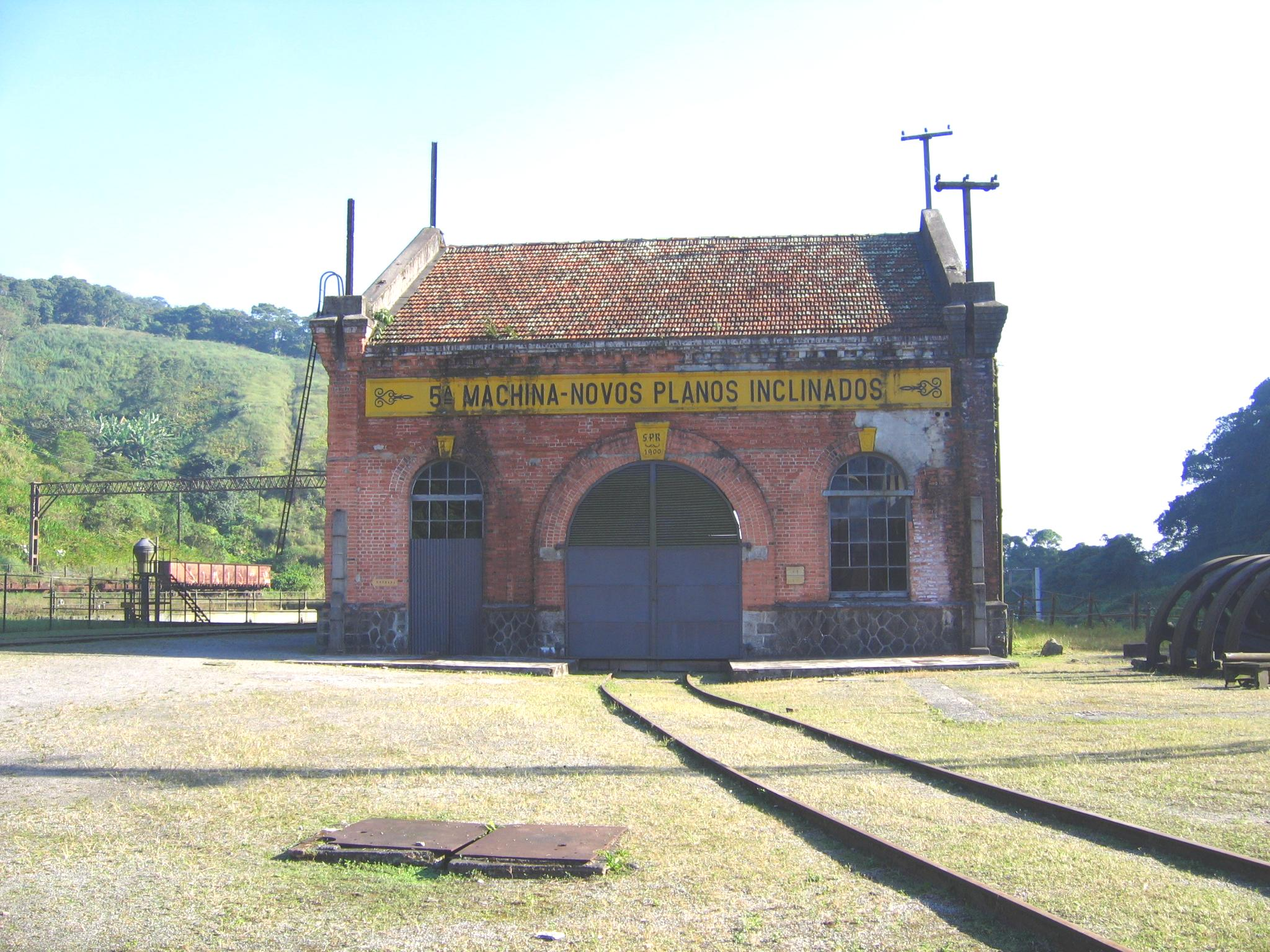
Power house of the fifth Serra Nova section in Paranapiacaba

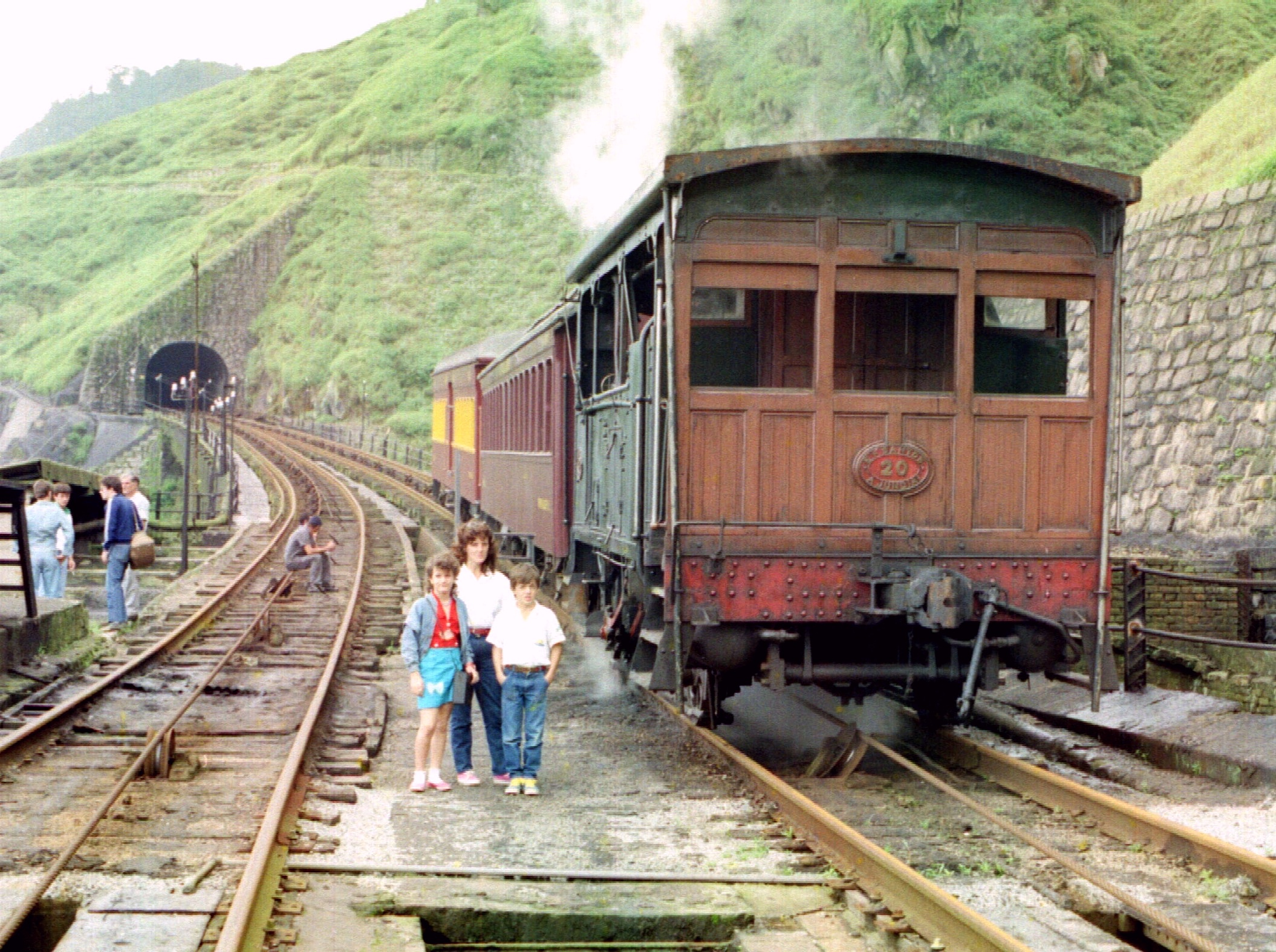
Locobreque with two coaches on a tourist trip in 1987

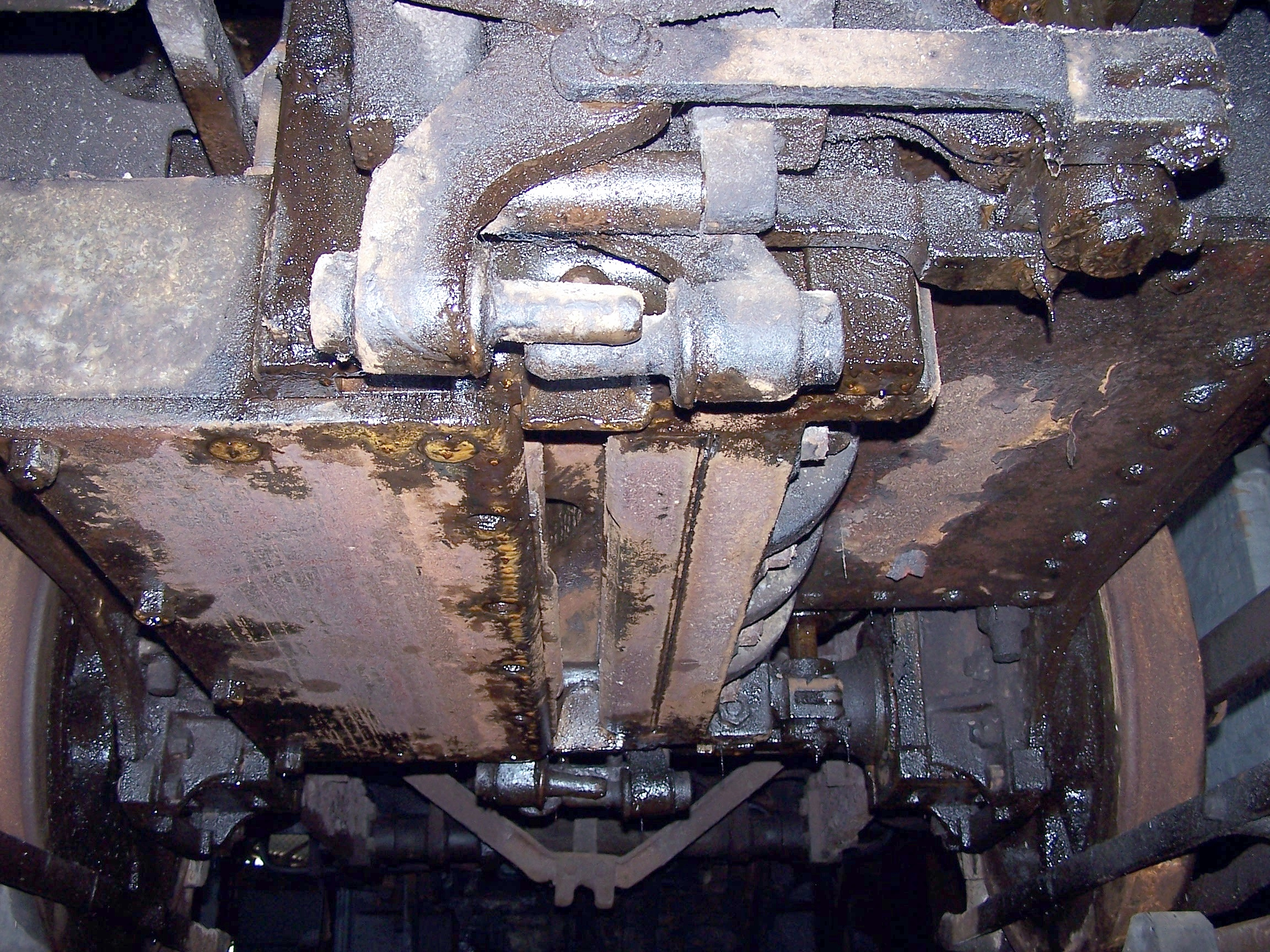
Grip of the Locobreque

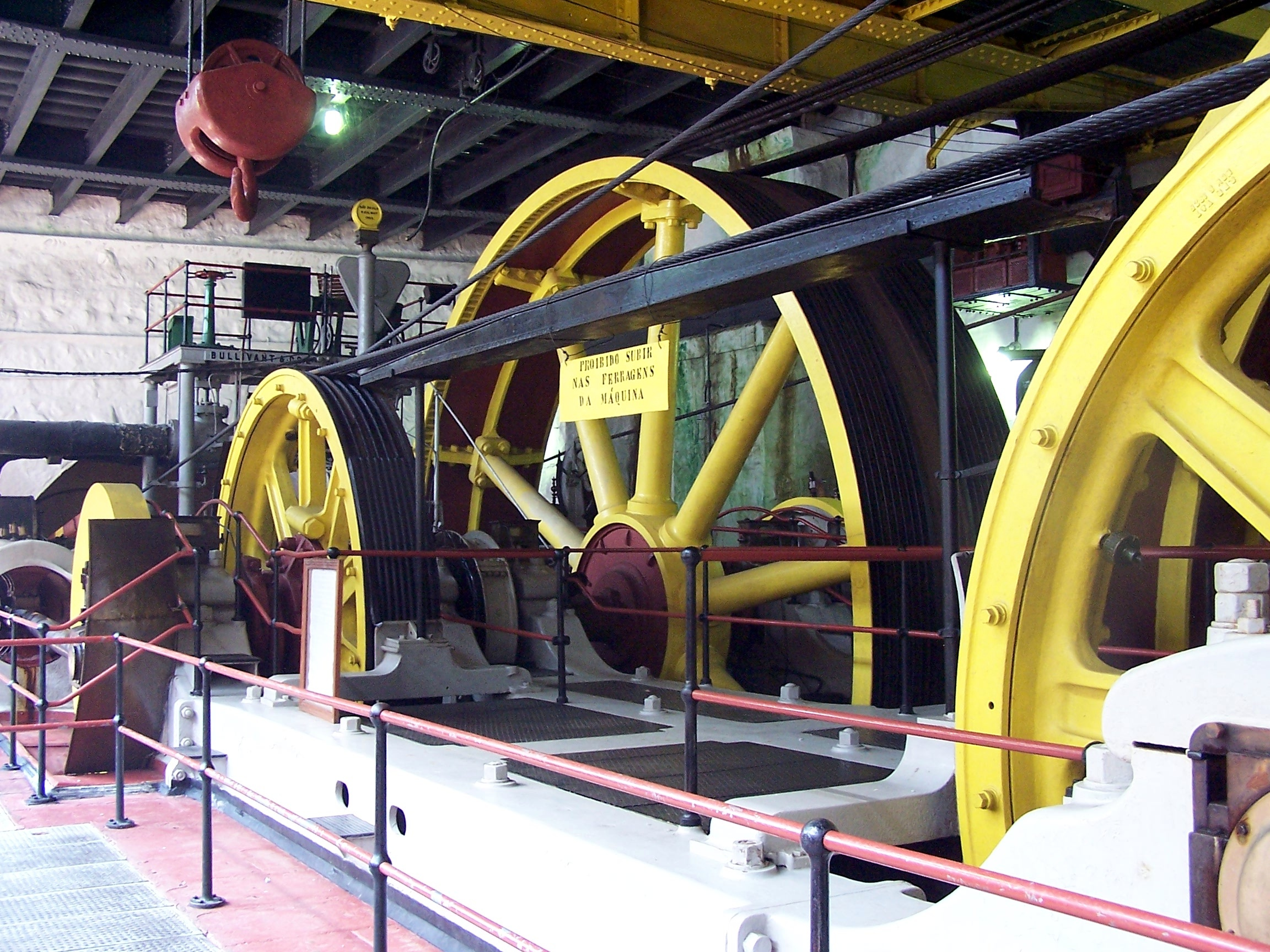
Steam engine in the power house at Paranapiacaba

== Protests ==
In 1889, the first protests were made against the British monopoly over the route to Porto de Santos, which culminated in the construction of Mairinque–Santos in 1937, by the Estrada de Ferro Sorocabana.

== Nationalisation ==
On 13 September 1946, the railroad was nationalised by the Brazilian government, and renamed the Estrada de Ferro Santos-Jundiaí, and on 27 September 1948, it was merged with most of the other Brazilian railways into the Rede Ferroviária Federal SA (RFFSA).

== Sistema Cremalheira-Aderência – the Rack-and-adhesion railway ==
In the 1970s (well after it had been renamed), the haulage system was replaced by an Abt rack system with a maximum gradient of 10.4 %, which was installed by Japanese firm Marubeni. The locomotives for this changeover were constructed by Hitachi with the help of SLM. They work with 3 kV DC supplied by overhead lines.

Starting from 2012, the original Hitachi locomotives were replaced by seven new-built machines supplied by Stadler.

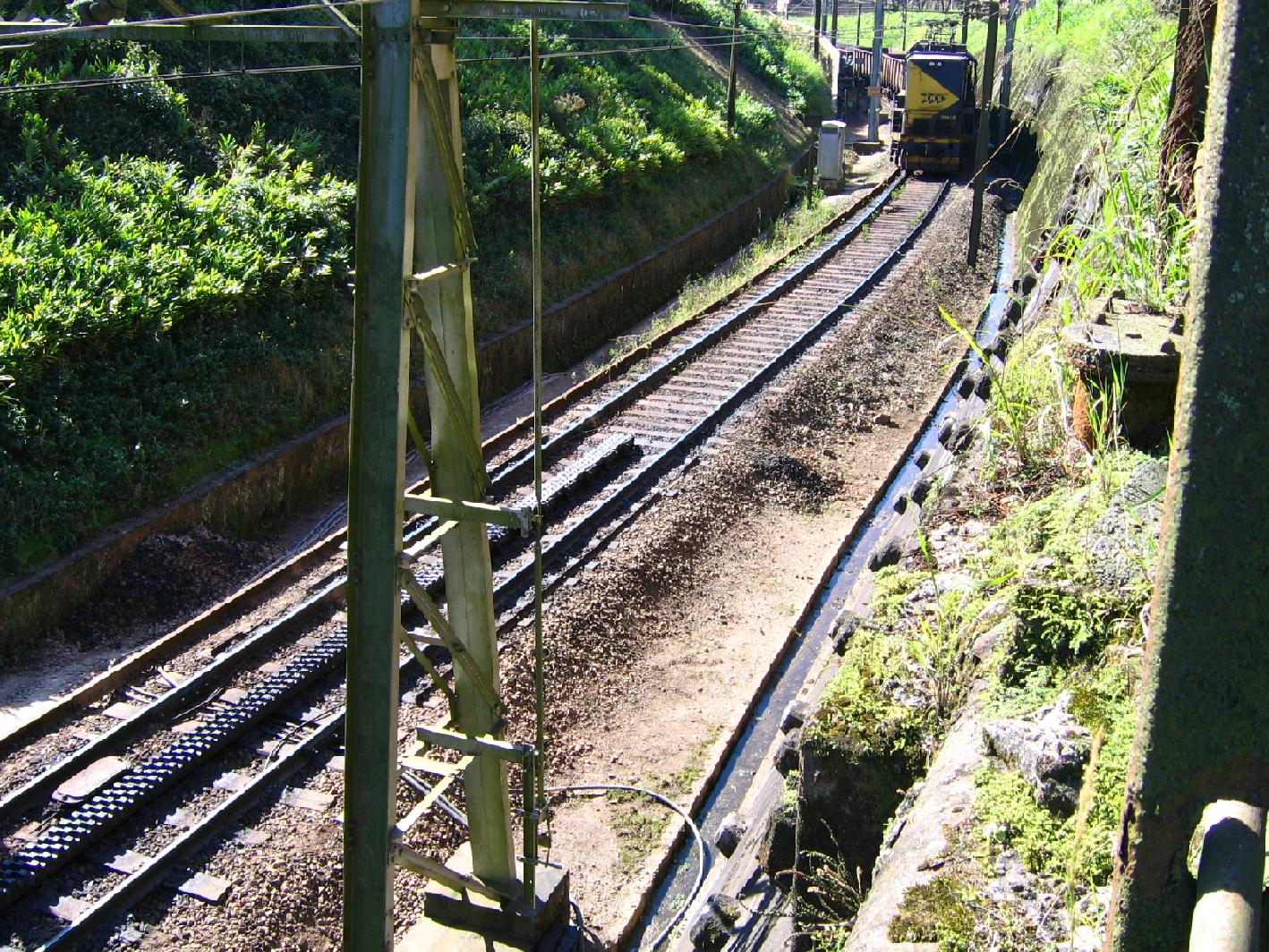
Top end of the rack railway section in Paranapiacaba

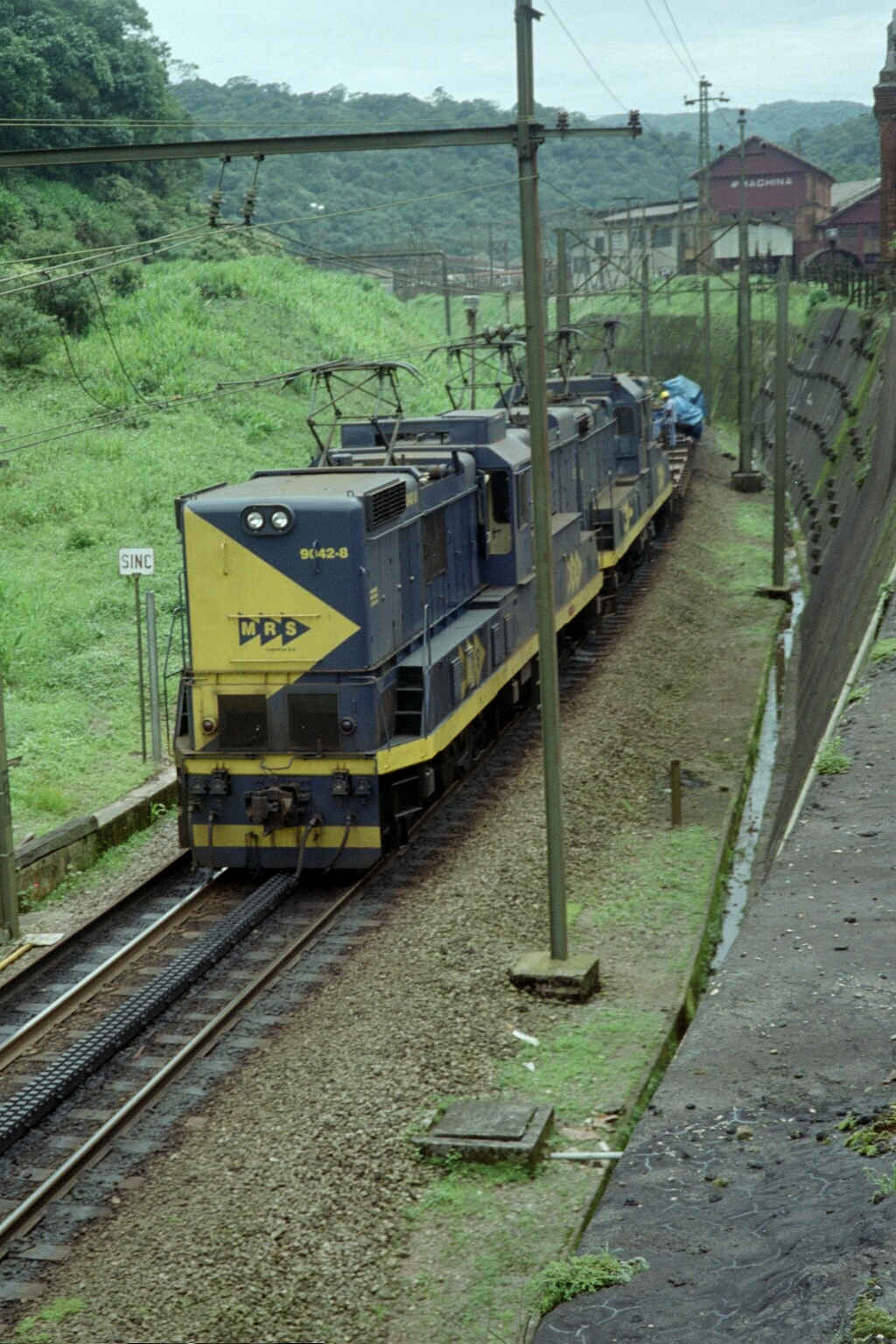
Two Hitachi locomotives with a downhill train entering the rack railway in Paranapiacaba

== See also ==
- Companhia Paulista de Trens Metropolitanos
- List of funicular railways
