= Doce River Basin =

Brazilian drainage basin

- Basin
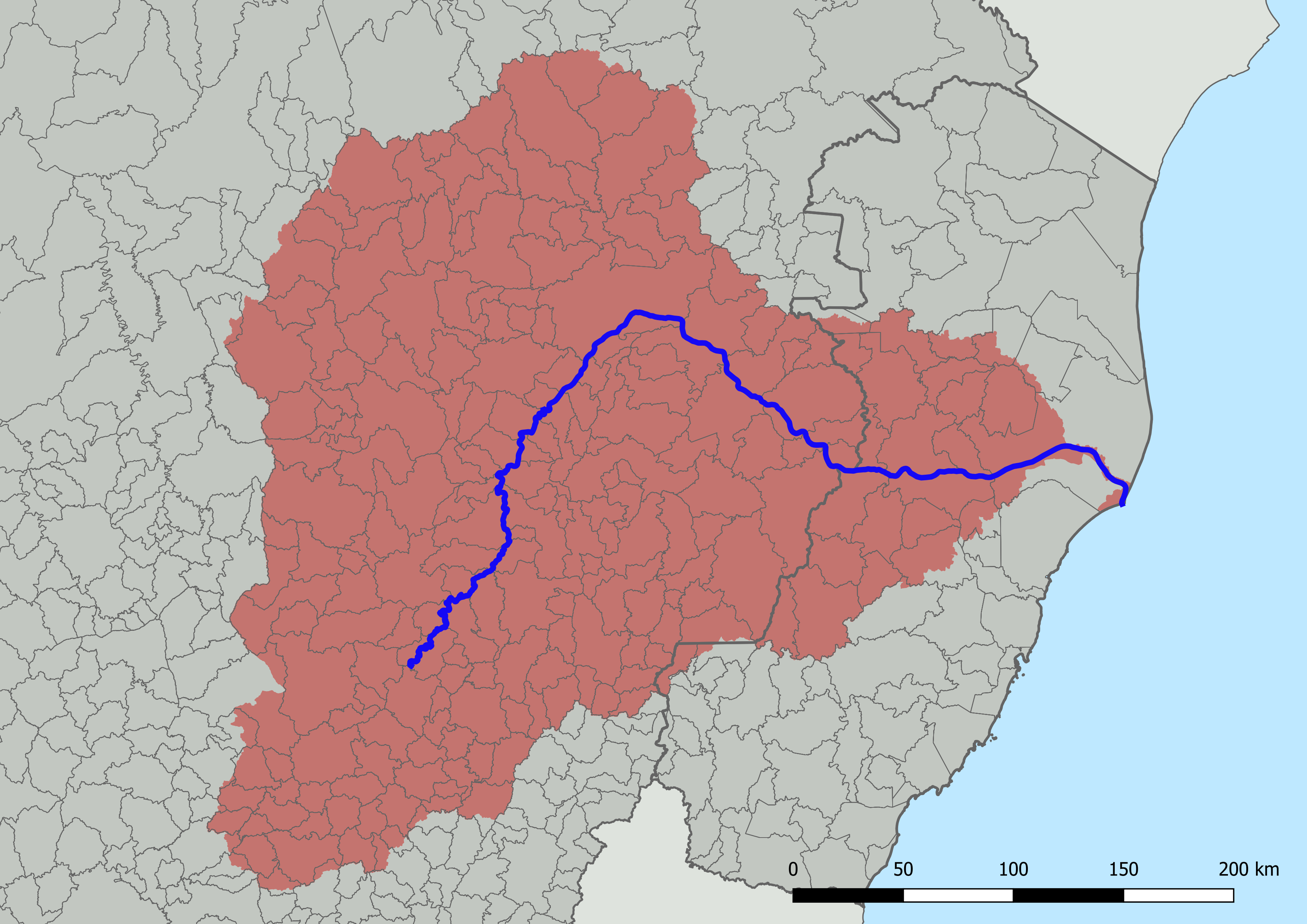
- Map of the Doce River Basin, Brazil, with division into municipalities.
- Interactive map of Doce River Basin
- Coordinates: 19°14′14.31″S 42°11′20.33″W
- Location: Brazil

Area
  - Total: 86,175 square kilometres (33,272 sq mi)

The Doce River Basin (Portuguese: Bacia do rio Doce) is located in the southeastern region of Brazil. According to the Doce River Basin Committee (CBH-Doce), it belongs to the Southeast Atlantic hydrographic region, has a drainage area of 86,175 square kilometers and covers all or part of 229 municipalities. 86% of the basin's area belongs to the state of Minas Gerais, in the Doce River Valley, and 14% to Espírito Santo.

== Description ==
The main sources of the Doce River emerge in the Mantiqueira and Espinhaço mountain ranges. It is formed from the confluence of the Piranga and Carmo rivers between the municipalities of Ponte Nova, Rio Doce and Santa Cruz do Escalvado, in the state of Minas Gerais. It runs 853 kilometers to its mouth in the Atlantic Ocean at Linhares, on the coast of Espírito Santo.

The main tributaries of the Doce River on the left bank include the Piracicaba, Santo Antônio, Corrente Grande, Suaçuí Pequeno, Suaçuí Grande (in Minas Gerais), Pancas and São José (in Espírito Santo). On the right bank, the main affluents are the Casca, Matipó, Caratinga and Manhuaçu rivers (in Minas Gerais), and the Guandu, Santa Joana and Santa Maria do Rio Doce rivers (in Espírito Santo).

The Doce River Basin is composed of the main sub-basins of the Piranga, Piracicaba, Santo Antônio, Suaçuí (Pequeno and Grande), Caratinga and Manhuaçu rivers in Minas Gerais; and the Guandu, Santa Joana and Santa Maria do Doce rivers in Espírito Santo.

== Climate ==
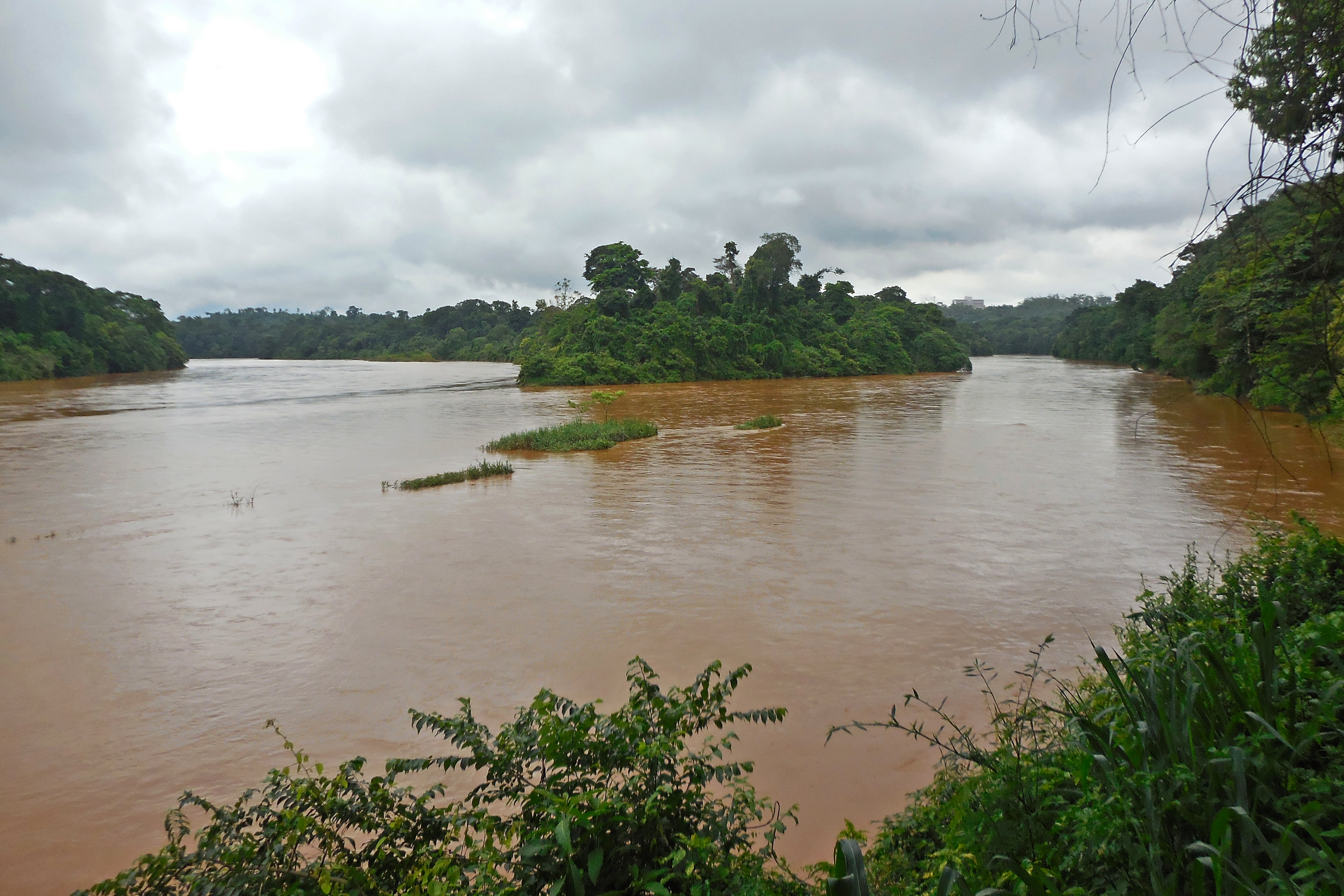
Piracicaba River mouth in the Doce River between Timóteo and Ipatinga.

The topography and the sea directly affect the climatic characteristics of the Doce River Basin. In winter, the presence of the South Atlantic anticyclone favors the dominance of high pressure and prevents humidity from rising, forming the dry season. There is also the intrusion of polar air masses, which makes it difficult for temperatures to rise and instabilities to form. The terrain and the coastline are detrimental to the action of polar air and prevent the maintenance of low average temperatures (less than 18 °C) in the coldest month of the year at most altitudes below 300 meters. In summer, the temperature rises easily and the influence of tropical instabilities sets up the wet season.

The lower altitude areas, which include a large part of Espírito Santo and the valley bottoms formed by the course of the Doce River, have the highest temperatures and lowest average rainfall, ranging from 1,000 to 1,200 millimeters a year. These conditions characterize the semi-humid tropical climate (Aw, according to the Köppen-Geiger climate classification), present in the Steel Valley, Governador Valadares, Aimorés and Colatina. Throughout the basin, the highest altitudes are affected by annual rainfall of more than 1,200 millimeters and the lowest average temperatures, characterizing the subhumid temperate climate. The northern part, classified as Cwa, is characterized by hot summers, as in Itambacuri, São João Evangelista and Itabira. To the south, where forest plateaus dominate, summers are cool and the climate is designated as Cwb, as occurs in Viçosa, Ponte Nova and part of Caratinga.

== Geomorphology and geology ==
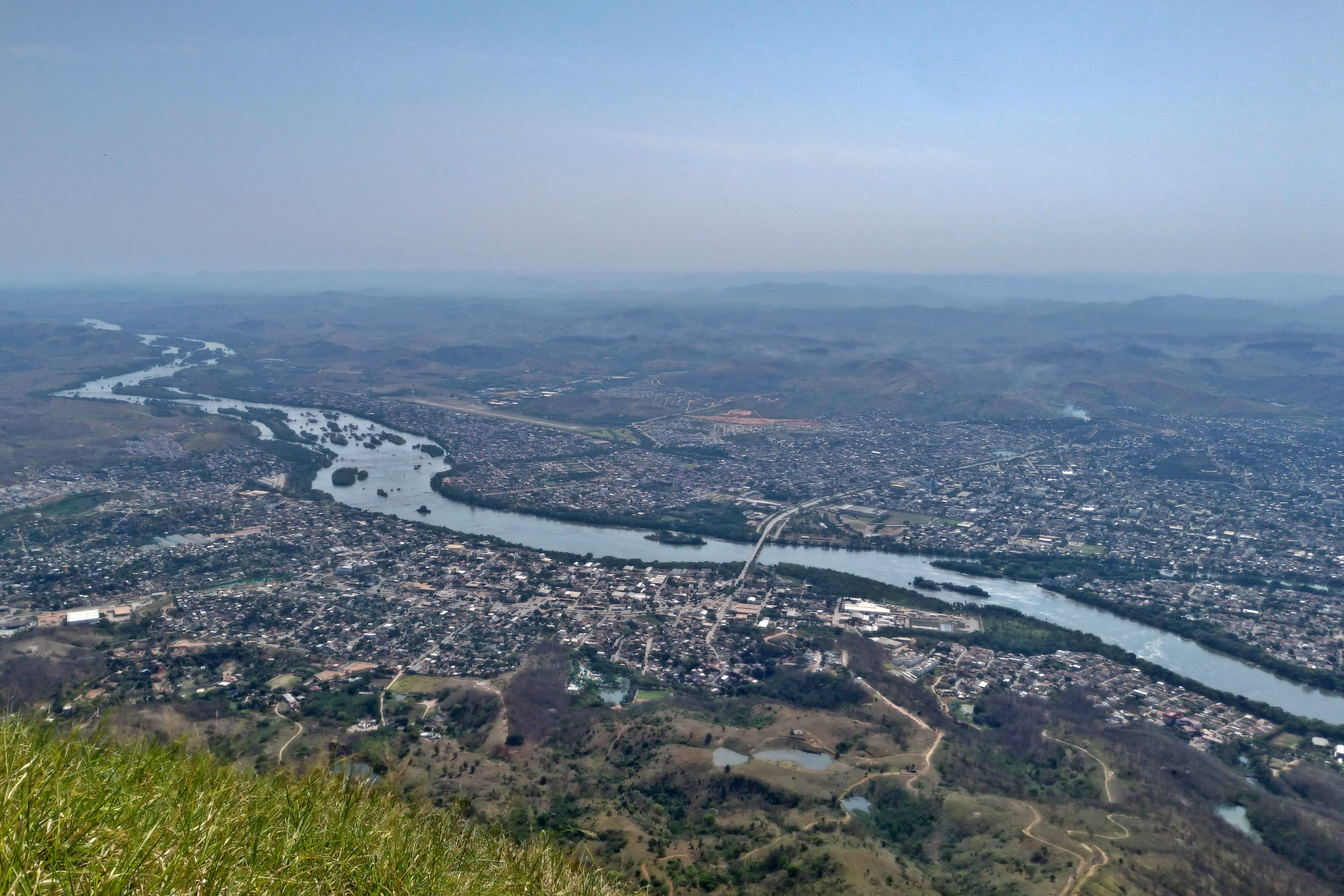
Doce River in Governador Valadares, Minas Gerais, Brazil, seen from the Ibituruna Peak.

The relief of the Doce River Basin is significantly rugged and characterized by the mares de morros. The course traces a lowland area called the Doce River interplateau depression, with average altitudes in its interior ranging from 250 to 500 meters on hills of medium slope. Until it reaches Governador Valadares, the Doce River follows a southwest–northeast course that intersects the geological unit known as the "Cinturão Atlântico", which is part of the Mantiqueira Province.

The dissected plateaus of south-central and eastern Minas Gerais occupy around 70% of the basin's area and have an undulating relief, including landforms such as ridges, valleys and hills. Other relevant geological units in the basin are the Espinhaço mountain range, to the east, composed of ruiniform structures shaped by fluvial erosion and dividing the basins of the Doce, São Francisco and Jequitinhonha rivers; and the Iron Quadrangle, at the western end, with altitudes ranging from 1,000 to 1,700 meters, exceeding 2,000 meters in the Caraça mountain range, under rocks dissected by the geological structure. However, the highest altitude in the basin area is found in Iúna, in Espírito Santo, at 2 627 meters.

The subsoil has several aquifers, but the majority (92.6% of the total) are fractured aquifers with low water productivity. Around 3.5% is concentrated in the coastal region of Espírito Santo, where productivity is potentially high but variable. The alluvial aquifer located under the Steel Valley, which accounts for 3% of the mass, is the only one with high productivity and flow, serving as the main source of public supply. The rest of the aquifers are karst or double porosity types, with variable water productivity.

=== Pedology ===
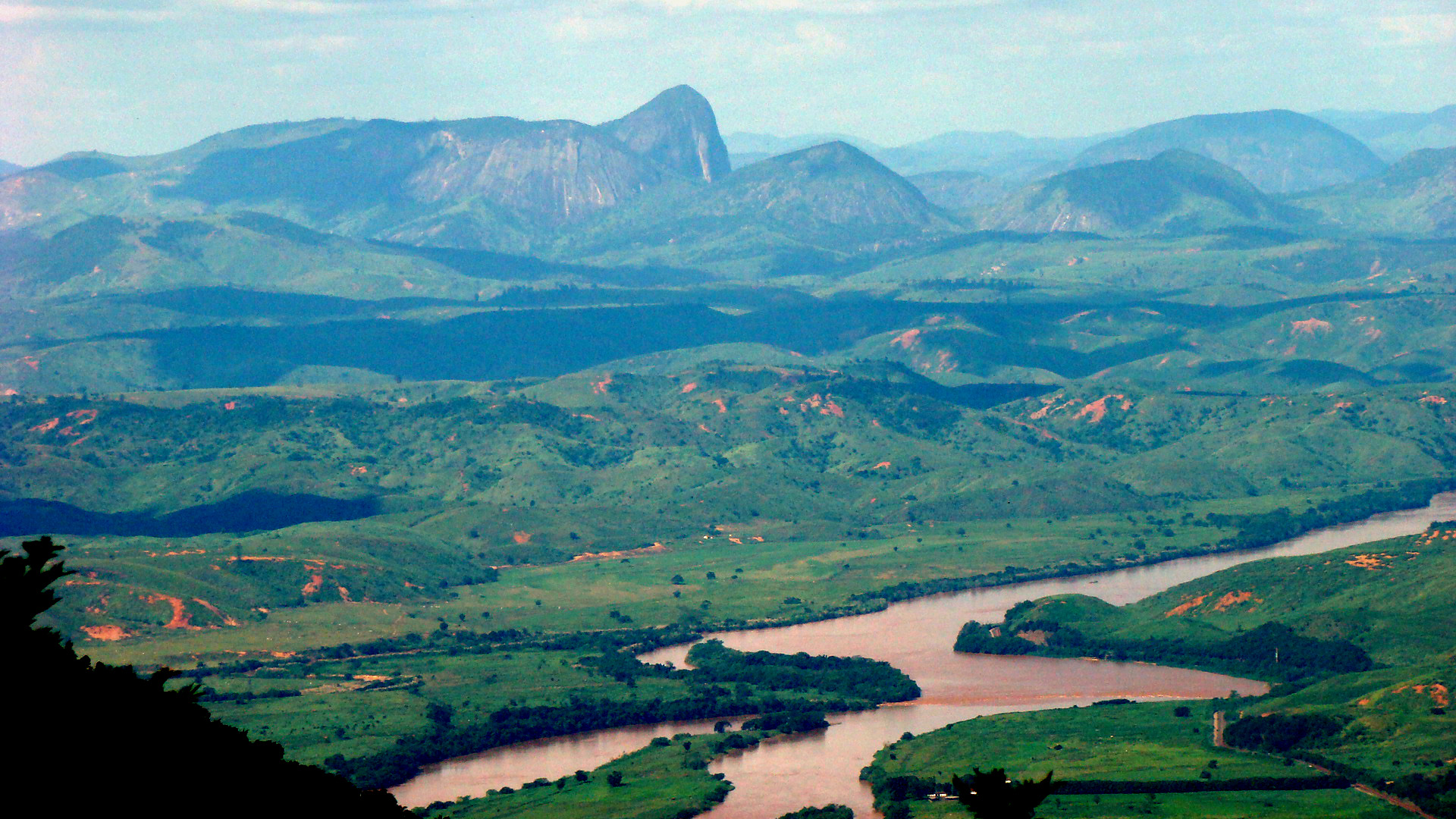
A stretch of the middle Doce River with undulating and mountainous terrain all around.

In the Doce River depression, rocks from the gneissic-magmatic-metamorphic complex predominate, including biotite-gneiss, granitic and granite-gneissic rocks; to a lesser extent, rocks from the charnockitic complex. The granite-gneiss rocks of the Precambrian basement under crystalline structures are predominant in the dissected plateaus. In the Espinhaço mountain range, the composition is predominantly quartzite rocks, while in the Iron Quadrangle, itacolumite, itabirite and quartzite ridges stand out.

Soils of the red-yellow latosol and red-yellow acrisol classes predominate in the basin. Latosols, registered from flat to mountainous terrain, are drained, dystrophic and alkalic (with a high concentration of aluminum), and formed mainly from gneissic and magmatic rocks, schists and sandy-clay deposits. Acrisol is formed from gneissic and magmatic rocks, charnoquites and schists and is also found on flat to mountainous terrain but is more common in hilly areas. It is the most susceptible to erosion, but also the most suitable for some of the region's agricultural crops, such as corn, rice, coffee and pastures. Humic latosols, litholic soils, cambisols and rock outcrops are found to a lesser extent.

== Environmental disaster ==
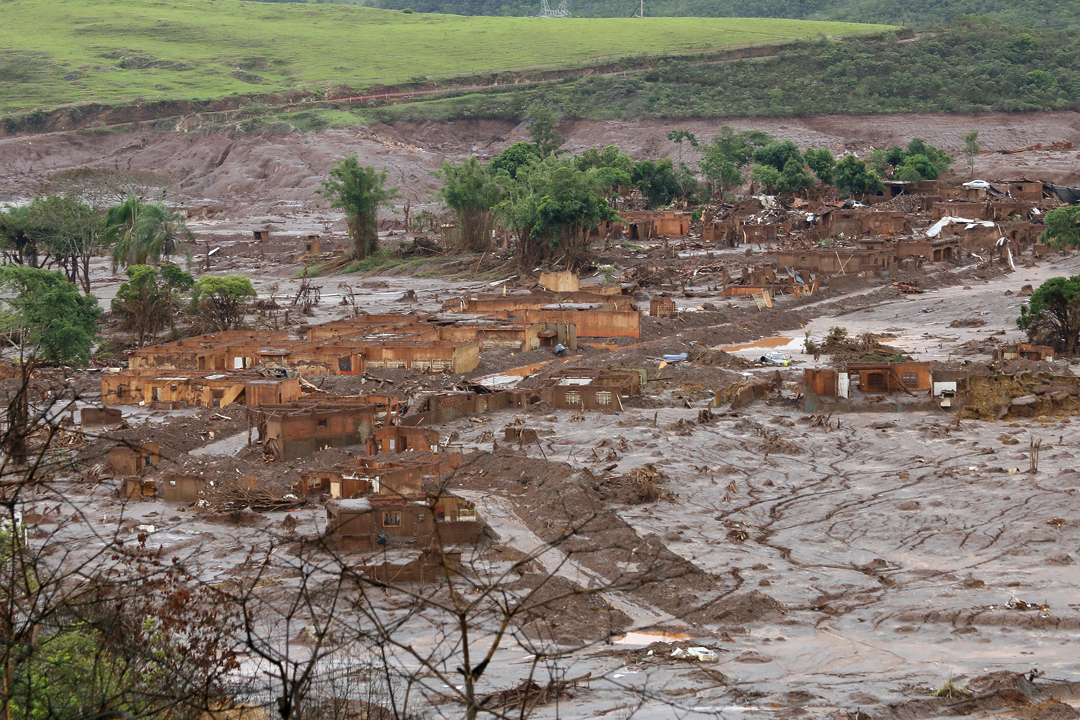
The village of Bento Rodrigues after the disaster

On November 5, 2015, a mining tailings dam collapsed in the subdistrict of Bento Rodrigues, in the municipality of Mariana, in the state of Minas Gerais, and caused a torrent of 62 million cubic meters of mining tailings discharged into the Doce River. The event was considered the biggest environmental disaster in Brazil's history and the worst tailings dam accident ever recorded in the world.

== See also ==
- Mariana dam disaster
- Brumadinho dam disaster
