= Mundano =

Brazilian street artist

Thiago Mundano
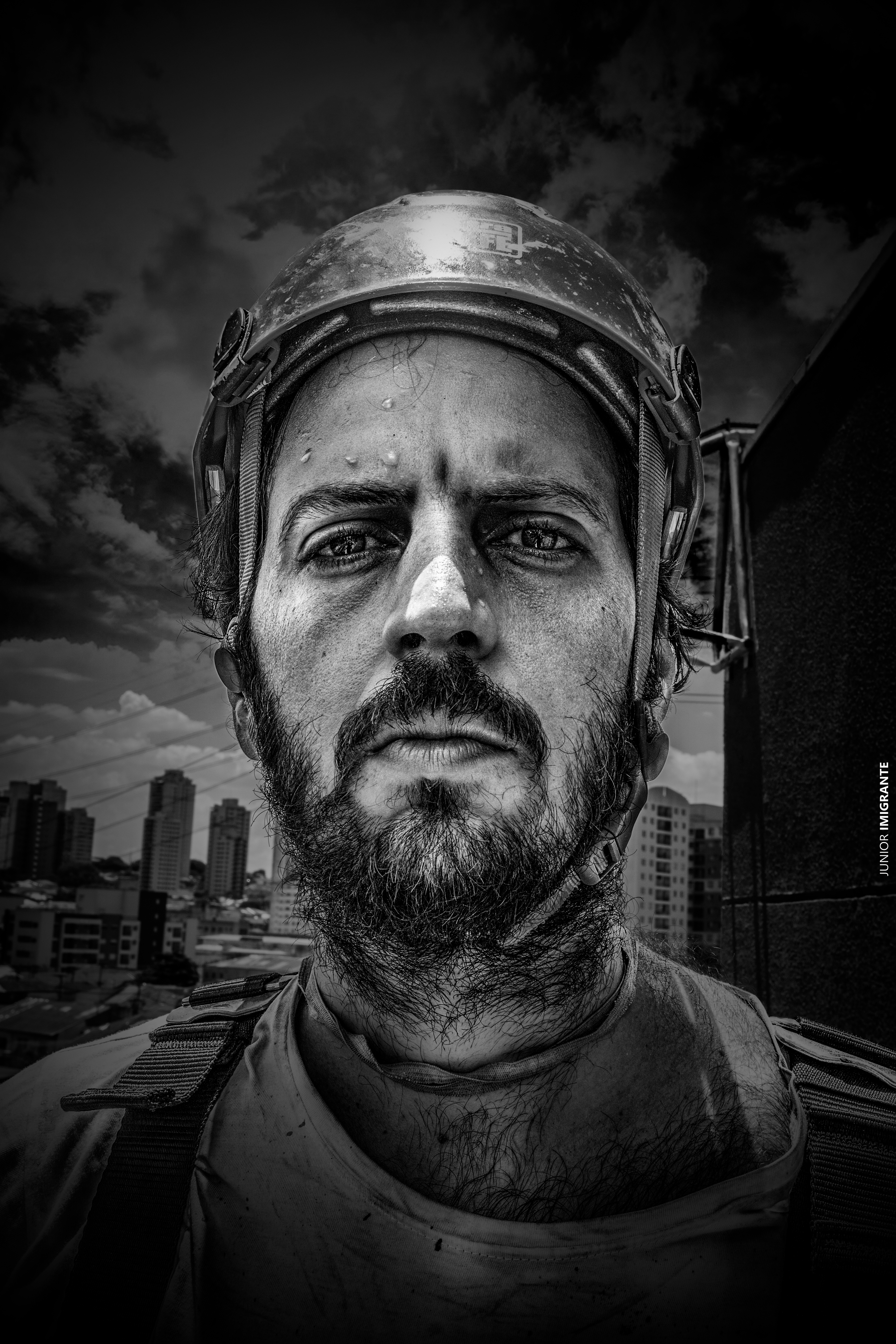
- Born: 1986 (age 39–40); São Paulo/SP - Brazil
- Occupation: Artivist
- Website: https://www.instagram.com/mundano_sp/

Thiago Mota, known as Mundano, is a Brazilian street artist. He was born in São Paulo.

Mundano began doing street art in the early 2000s. In 2007 he painted graffiti on the legislative assembly plaque in Ibirapuera Park, São Paulo. The plaque, which is in the form of a concrete block, is normally grey in color. The São Paulo prefeitura repainted the block in grey, and Mundano repainted the graffiti. This back-and-forth sequence was repeated twenty-five times.

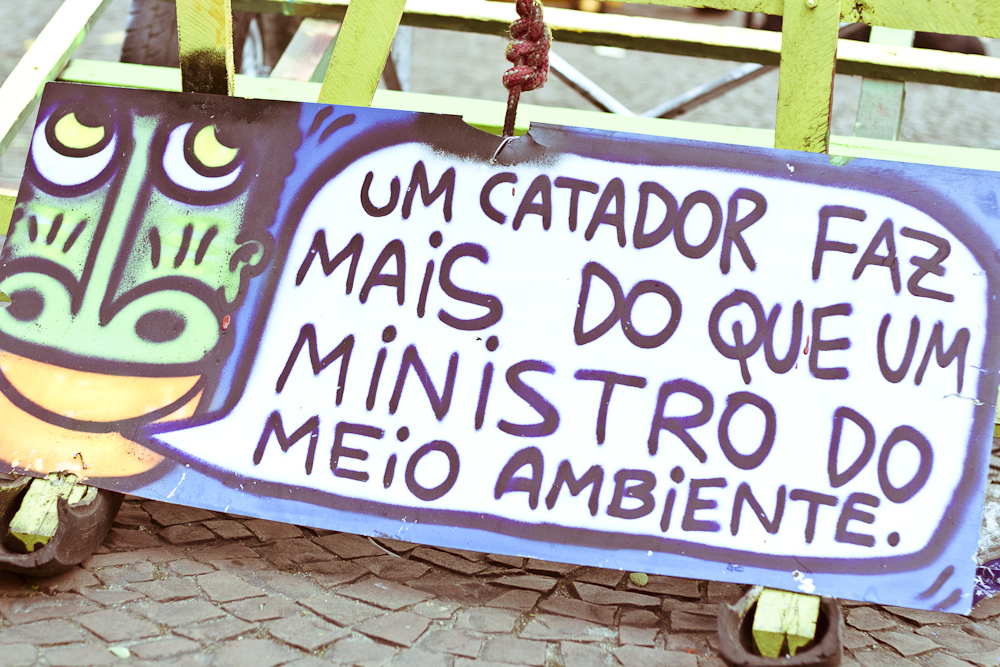
Painted wagon from the Pimp my Carroça movement.

In 2012 he instigated a movement called Pimp My Carroca, working with other artists to paint the carts of Brazilian trash collectors. The movement is named after the American television show Pimp My Ride.

His São Paulo mural Workers of Brumadinho is a memorial to the 270 miners who died when a dam burst at Minas Gerais, Brazil. In 2021, using ash from fires in the Amazon rain forest, he painted a 1000 square metre mural in São Paulo. He created the work, titled The Forest Brigade, to bring attention to the fires and the resulting deforestation.
