= Icahn Enterprises =

American conglomerate

Icahn Enterprises L.P.
- Type: Public
- Traded as: Nasdaq: IEP
- Industry: Conglomerate
- Predecessor: American Real Estate Partners L.P.
- Founded: February 17, 1987; 39 years ago
- Headquarters: Sunny Isles Beach, Florida, U.S.
- Key people: Carl Icahn (Chairman); Ted Papapostolou (CEO)
- Revenue: ▼US$10.02 billion (2024)
- Net income: ▲ −US$445 million (2024)
- Total assets: ▼US$16.28 billion (2024)
- Total equity: ▼US$4.621 billion (2024)
- Owner: Carl Icahn (86%)
- Number of employees: 37 (2024)
- Website: ielp.com

Icahn Enterprises L.P. is an American publicly traded master limited partnership and conglomerate headquartered at Milton Tower in Sunny Isles Beach, Florida. The company has investments in various industries including energy, automotive, food packaging, metals, real estate and home fashion. The company is controlled by Carl Icahn, who owns 86 percent of it.

== History ==
The company was incorporated on February 17, 1987.

In 2006, the company sold the Sands Atlantic City hotel in Atlantic City, New Jersey and several of the adjacent lots for $274.8 million to Pinnacle Entertainment.

In April 2007, the company sold its American Casino & Entertainment Properties to an affiliate of Goldman Sachs, for $1.3 billion. In September 2007, American Real Estate Partners, another entity controlled by Icahn, merged with the firm and changed its name to Icahn Enterprises L.P.

In 2008, the company acquired PSC Metals for $335 million.

In February 2016, Icahn Enterprises purchased Trump Entertainment Resorts, which owned the Hard Rock Hotel & Casino Atlantic City. The company sold the casino to the owners of Hard Rock Cafe for $50 million in May 2017 - which represented a recuperation of just 4 cents on the dollar. Also in February 2016, the company acquired Pep Boys.

In January 2017, the company acquired Federal-Mogul. In June 2017, the company acquired Precision Auto Care, a chain of over 250 vehicle repair shops. In August 2017, the company sold the property formerly known as the Fontainebleau Resort Las Vegas for $600 million. The company had acquired the property in 2010 for $148 million. In October 2017, the company acquired American Driveline Systems. The company had 89,034 employees as of 2017.

In October 2020, Carl Icahn announced his son Brett would succeed him as chairman of Icahn Enterprises and CEO of its investment subsidiary Icahn Capital LP.

In November 2020, Icahn Enterprises reported third quarter losses of $714 million, compared to a loss of $49 million the same quarter the previous year.

On January 31, 2023, one of its subsidiaries, Auto Plus, filed for Chapter 11 bankruptcy, and Pep Boys spun off into its own company.

=== Hindenburg Research ===
In May 2023, short seller Hindenburg Research released an analysis of Icahn Enterprises with claims that the company is over-valued due to paying large dividends using investments from new investors. In addition, the analysis claims that Icahn took out loans against a majority of his holdings and that these have the potential to be called should the stock price move downward. On the day of the release of this analysis the share price of Icahn Enterprises dropped by 20%. Hindenburg also accused Icahn of running a "Ponzi-like economic structure". The company announced in its quarterly earnings report in August 2023 that it would cut its dividend in half.

Following the release of the short report, in August 2024 IEP and Icahn were investigated by the SEC and fined $1.5 million and $500,000 respectively for failures highlighted in the report. As part of the settlement, Icahn and IEP did not admit or deny any wrongdoing.

A class-action lawsuit was filed and later dismissed in Florida in September 2024, with the decision highlighting that in disclosures IEP mentioned that dividends could be reduced, and the judge also found that Icahn's personal borrowing activities were adequately disclosed.

== Investments ==
As of December 2020, the company owns the following:

- CVR - petroleum refining and nitrogen fertilizer manufacturing
- American Railcar Industries
- Ferrous Resources (77.2%) - owns mining rights in Brazil
- Viskase (74.6%) - produces cellulosic, fibrous and plastic casings for the processed meat and poultry industry
- Bayswater Development - a real estate development company
- WestPoint Home - bed and bath fashion productions
- Vivus - pharmaceutical company
