= Thomas Goodhead =

British barrister

Thomas Goodhead (born 1982, also known as Tom Goodhead) is a British barrister and the chief executive officer and Global Managing Partner of Pogust Goodhead.

== Early life ==
Goodhead graduated in law from the University of Oxford. In 2007, he attempted to stand as the Conservative Party candidate for the Welsh Assembly seat of Blaenau Gwent. He could not stand after missing the application deadline as he was in the United States with his fiancé.

Goodhead qualified as a Barrister after graduating from City University, London and the University of Law.

== Career ==
Goodhead was called to the bar in July 2010. In 2018, Thomas Goodhead co-founded SPG Law in Liverpool, UK, with US attorney Harris Pogust. The firm, affiliated with the American law firm Sanders Phillips Grossman, specialized in class action lawsuits.

In January 2023, Thomas was named as one of the UK's top 100 lawyers by leading legal publication, The Lawyer, in their annual Hot 100 feature.

By September 2025, Goodhead had been removed from his position at the firm Pogust Goodhead and was replaced as CEO by Alicia Alinia.

== Personal life ==
He is the great great nephew of Aneurin Bevan.
