= Samarco =

Brazilian mining company

Samarco SA
- Type: Sociedade Anônima
- Industry: Mining
- Founded: 1977
- Headquarters: Belo Horizonte, MG, Brazil
- Area served: Minas Gerais; Espírito Santo
- Key people: Ricardo Vescovi (president)
- Products: Iron ore pellets
- Owner: Vale (50%); BHP (50%)
- Number of employees: approx. 2000 (2009)
- Website: www.samarco.com.br

Samarco Mineração S.A. is a Brazilian mining company founded in 1977. It is currently a joint-venture between the Brazilian Vale and the Australian BHP, each one holding 50% of the company's stocks.

== Structure ==
Samarco is hosted in Belo Horizonte, the capital of Minas Gerais. It has offices and mining facilities in Mariana and Ouro Preto, as well as in cities of Espírito Santo, such as Anchieta, which hosts the Ponta Ubu unity.

== Environmental disaster ==
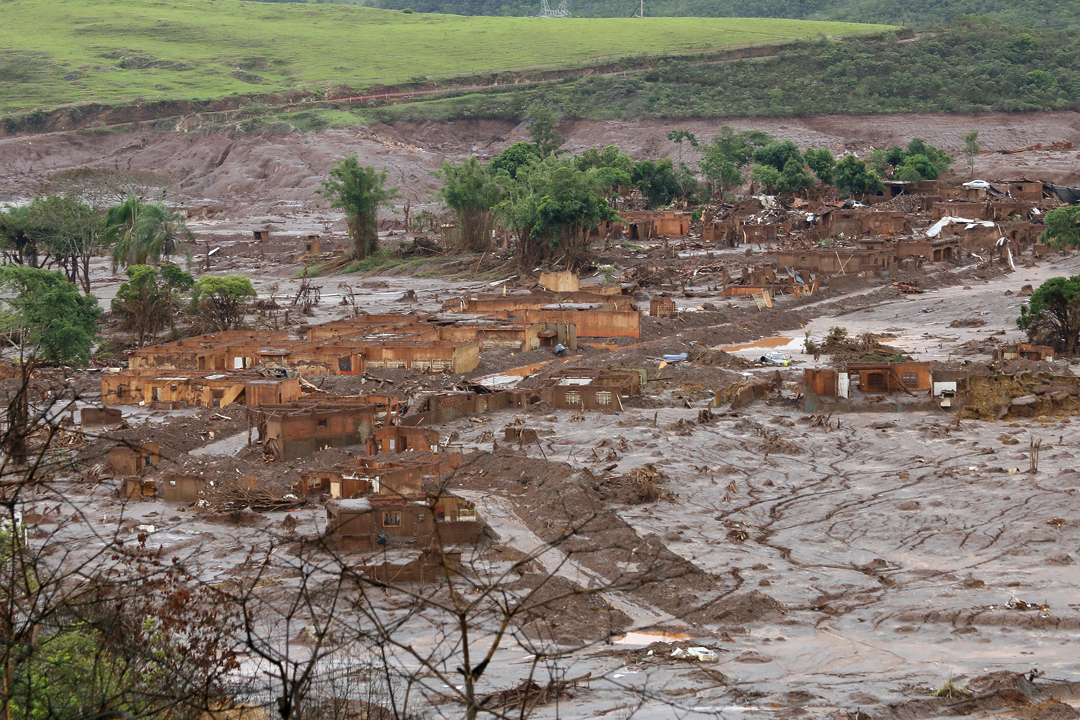
A village flooded in the Bento Rodrigues dam disaster (2015).

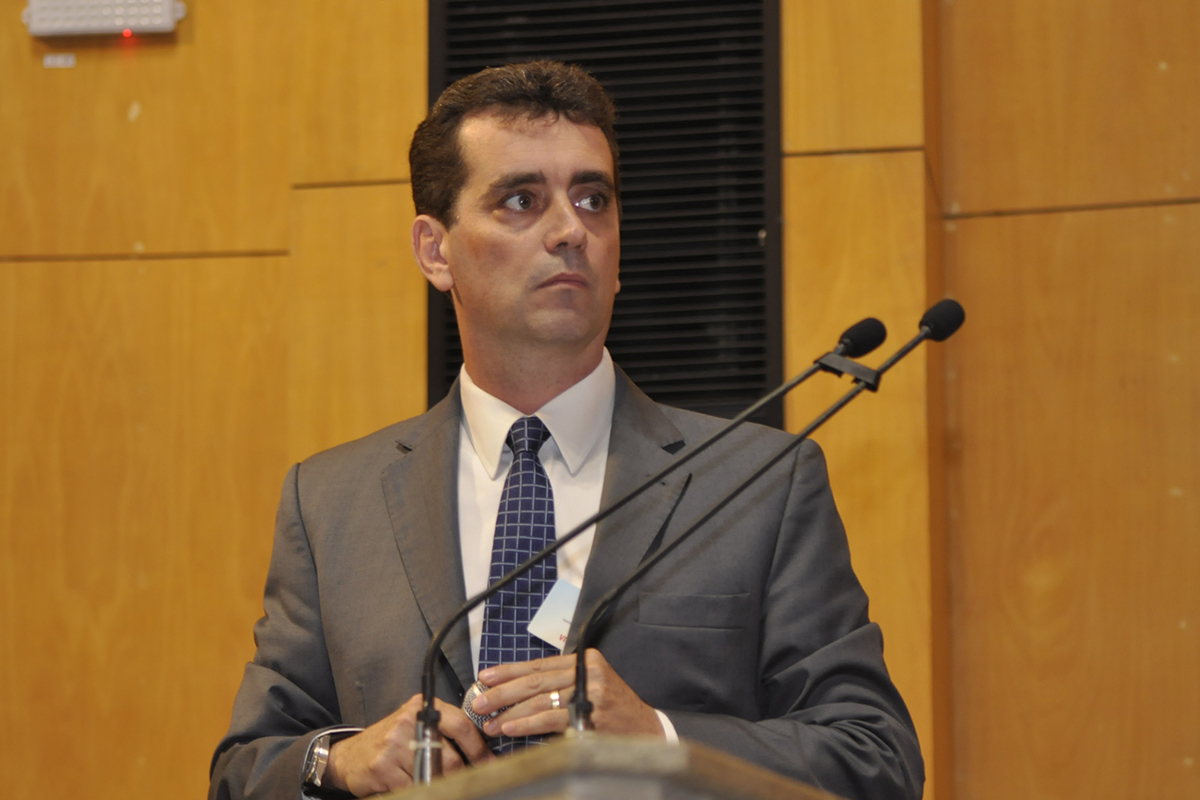
Ricardo Vescovi

On 5 November 2015, two dams in Mariana owned by Samarco that contained by-products of iron mining collapsed. The accident caused 19 casualties in the district of Bento Rodrigues and its surroundings. The mix of contaminated water and mud flowed to nearby rivers including the Rio Doce, an important river for the southeast regions of Brazil. The water contamination led to the suspension of water service in several cities that depend on water from the Doce River. This incident is considered to be the biggest environmental accident in the history of Minas Gerais.

As a consequence of the disaster, the Brazilian government suspended the company's activities.

We had a tragic event. Samarco is also involved and we are very supportive and suffered with everything that happened. I do not think it is the case of an apology, I find it appropriate to clearly see what happened.

— Kleber Terra, director of operations and infrastructure of Samarco

In Brazil, Samarco/Vale was involved in the financing of dozens of political campaigns with contributions that reached R$80 million in just the 2014 general elections, and many of these same politicians are now tasked with investigating the company's responsibilities for the disaster and setting the amount of fines.

In June 2016, Samarco had not accomplished any of 11 mandatory emergency actions, according to IBAMA. Among these 11 actions designed to minimize environmental damage, only four are partially accomplished, and the others seven are unfulfilled. Still, according to IBAMA, “the documentation delivered by SAMARCO refers to isolated areas without any integration between them”. “Considering the magnitude of the disaster, has not been presented a strategic planning with emergency operations schedule for the way between the area of the event and the hydroelectric plant Risoleta Neves.” “It’s been seven months since the disaster, the company should already have taken emergency actions related to the mitigation of the effects.”
