= Pogust Goodhead =

British law firm

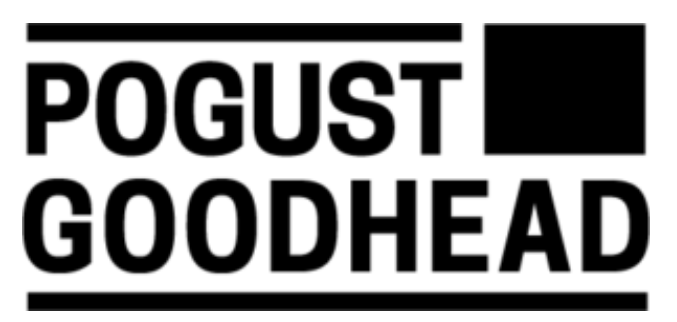

Pogust Goodhead (formerly PGMBM and SPG Law) is a British law firm, headquartered in London, England. Pogust Goodhead focuses on environmental law, consumer protection, and human rights.

== History ==
In 2018, Thomas Goodhead and Harris Pogust founded SPG Law, a law firm in Liverpool, England. SPG Law sat under parent firm Sanders Phillips Grossman.

In 2018, SPG filed a class action lawsuit in British courts against BHP and Vale regarding the Mariana dam disaster. Close to 700,000 people were represented in the lawsuit. Pogust Goodhead's costs in the case are expected to be around £250 million.

In 2026, a dispute arose over the representation of the claimants in the Mariana litigation after a client committee voted to replace Pogust Goodhead with Bailey Glasser International (BGI) and Hausfeld. Pogust Goodhead challenged the committee's authority to make the change, leading to proceedings in the High Court.

Thomas Goodhead, the firm's co-founder and former chief executive, subsequently joined the BGI team seeking to take over conduct of the litigation. In September 2026, fellow co-founder Harris Pogust also requested that the firm cease using his surname, after which Pogust Goodhead announced that it intended to change its name.

In 2021, PGMBM launched a platform called MyDieselClaim to coordinate efforts against vehicle manufacturers involved in the Dieselgate scandal. Pogust Goodhead has handled diesel-related cases against the companies of Abarth, Alfa Romeo, Audi, BMW, Chrysler, Citroen, Cupra, DS, Fiat, Ford, Hyundai, Jaguar, Jeep, Kia, Land Rover, Maserati, Mercedes, Mini, Nissan, Peugeot, Porsche, Renault, Seat Léon, Škoda, Suzuki, Vauxhall, Volkswagen and Volvo.

In 2022, PGMBM was renamed Pogust Goodhead. The firm gained publicity for winning a part of a £193m settlement from Volkswagen on behalf of 15,000 claimants. In 2022, the firm also opened offices in Rio de Janeiro and San Diego.

Pogust Goodhead participated in U.S. lawsuits alleging that Ozempic and Mounjaro caused serious gastrointestinal side effects and that Novo Nordisk and Eli Lilly inadequately warned patients and physicians of the risks. After the cases were consolidated into a multidistrict litigation in 2024, an attorney from Pogust Goodhead was appointed to the plaintiffs’ leadership committee, where the firm contributed to coordinating claims and advancing common legal theories across the consolidated cases. Pogust Goodhead no longer has a US office.
