= Pep Boys =

American automotive aftermarket service chain

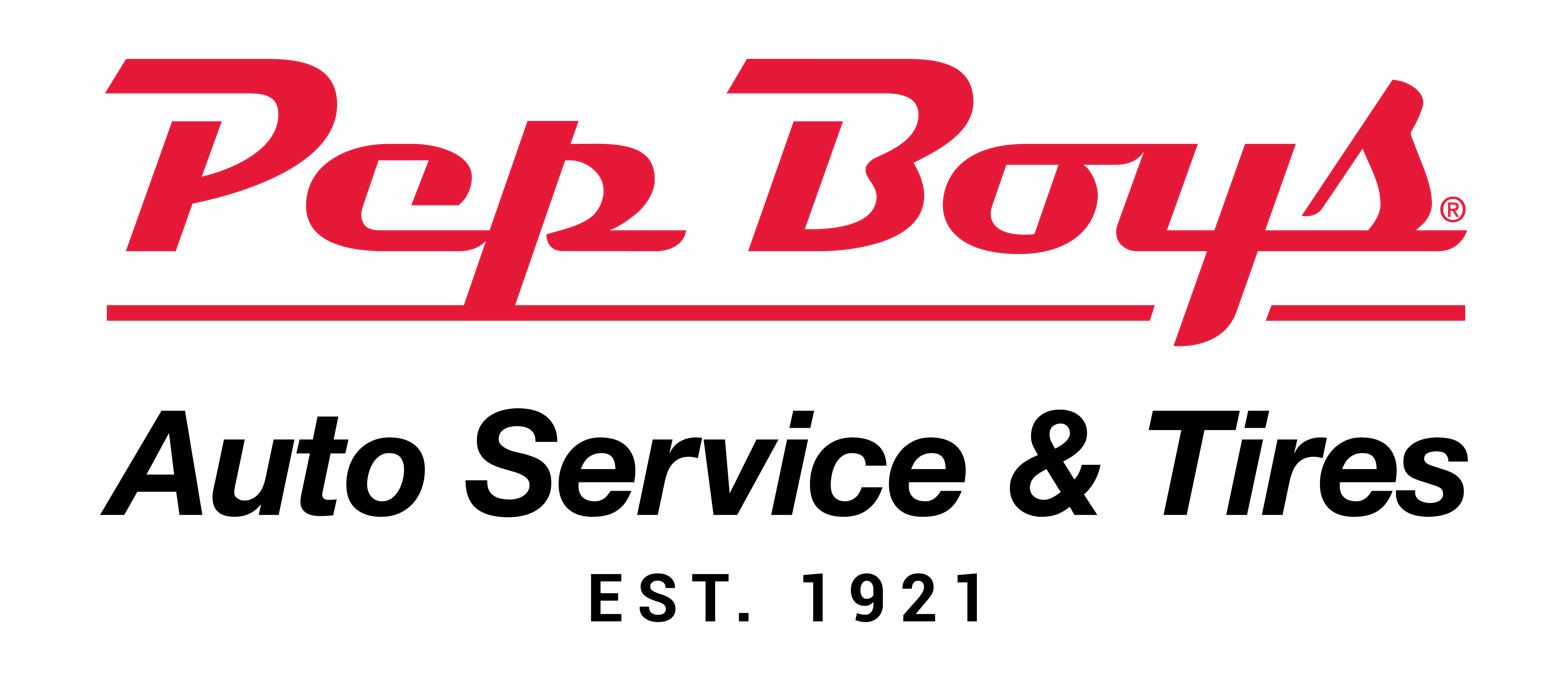
- Logo used from 2023 to present
- Type: Subsidiary
- Industry: Automotive maintenance and repair and tires
- Founded: August 1, 1921; 105 years ago (as Pep Auto Supply); 1923; 103 years ago (as Pep Boys)
- Founders: Maurice (Moe) Strauss; Emanuel (Manny) Rosenfeld; W. Graham (Jack) Jackson; Moe Radavitz
- Headquarters: Bala Cynwyd, Pennsylvania, U.S.
- Number of locations: 850
- Key people: Joe Auriemma (CEO)
- Products: Auto service and tires
- Number of employees: 8,000+ (2023)
- Parent: Icahn Enterprises
- Website: pepboys.com

Pep Boys is an American automotive aftermarket service chain. Originally named Pep Auto Supply, the company was founded in Philadelphia, Pennsylvania, in 1921 by Emanuel "Manny" Rosenfeld, Maurice "Moe" Strauss, W. Graham "Jack" Jackson, and Moe Radavitz. Pep Boys is headquartered in the Philadelphia suburb of Bala Cynwyd, Pennsylvania. Pep Boys provides name-brand tires, automotive maintenance and repair, and fleet maintenance and repair to customers across the United States. As of 2016, Pep Boys operated more than 9,000 service bays in 35 states and Puerto Rico. They also offer the Pep Boys Mobile Crew service trailer, which offers automotive maintenance on location.

== History ==
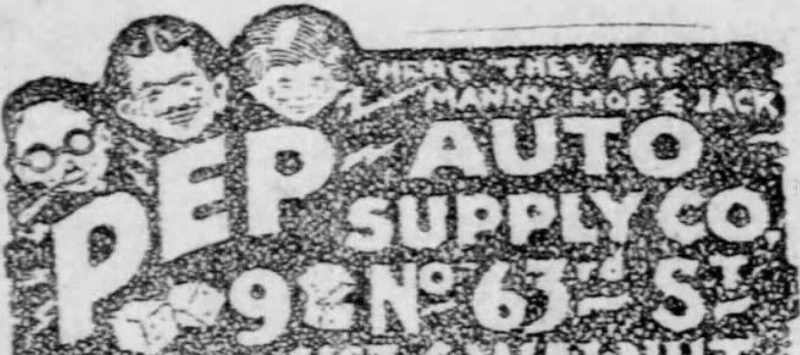
One of the very first Pep Boys ads circa 1923-1924, featuring the original Jack face, which is now no longer used and has been replaced, as well the first appearances of the Manny and Moe faces that are both still on the current logo today.

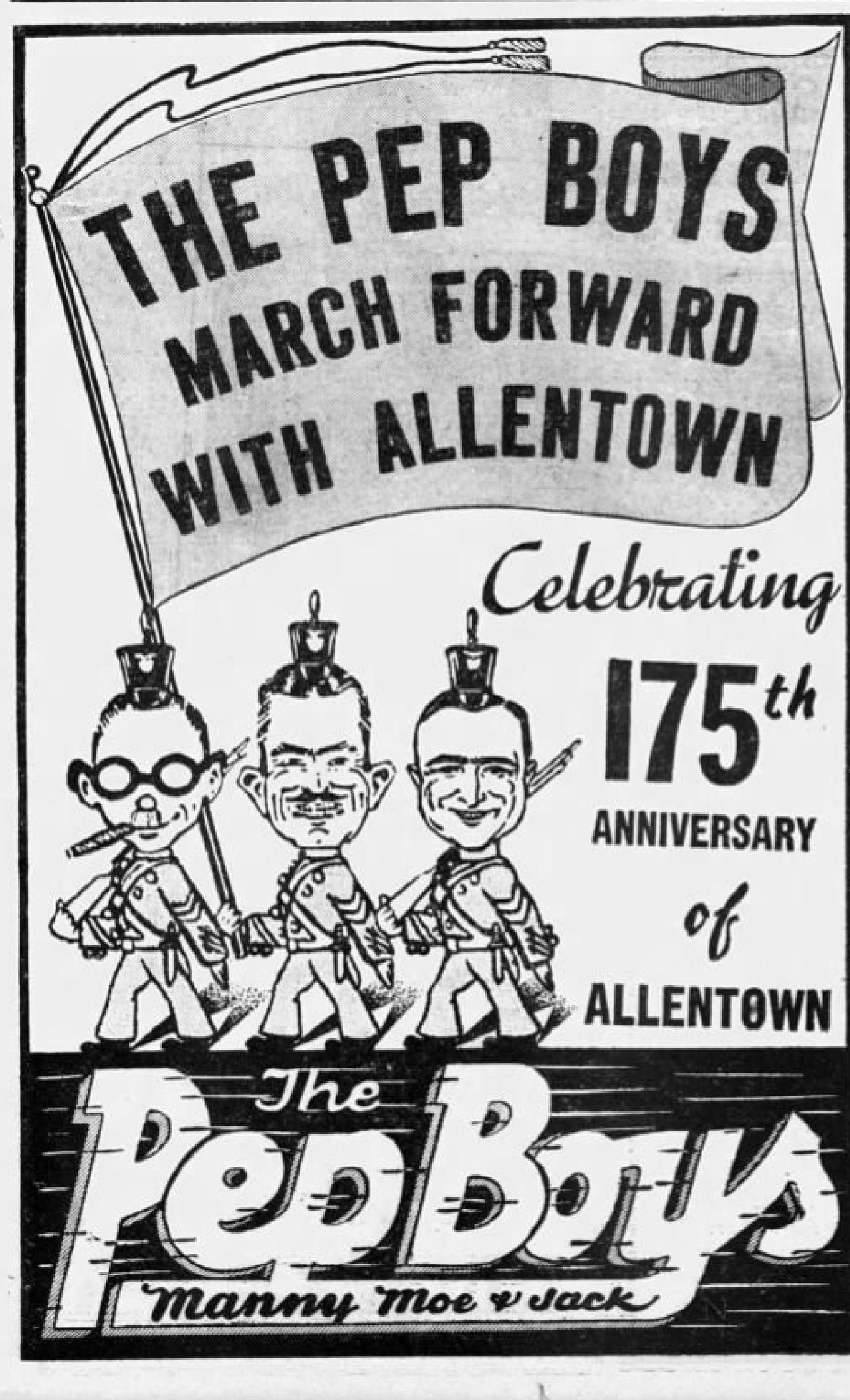
An ad for Pep Boys featuring the current Jack face, for a former Allentown, Pennsylvania store in 1937.

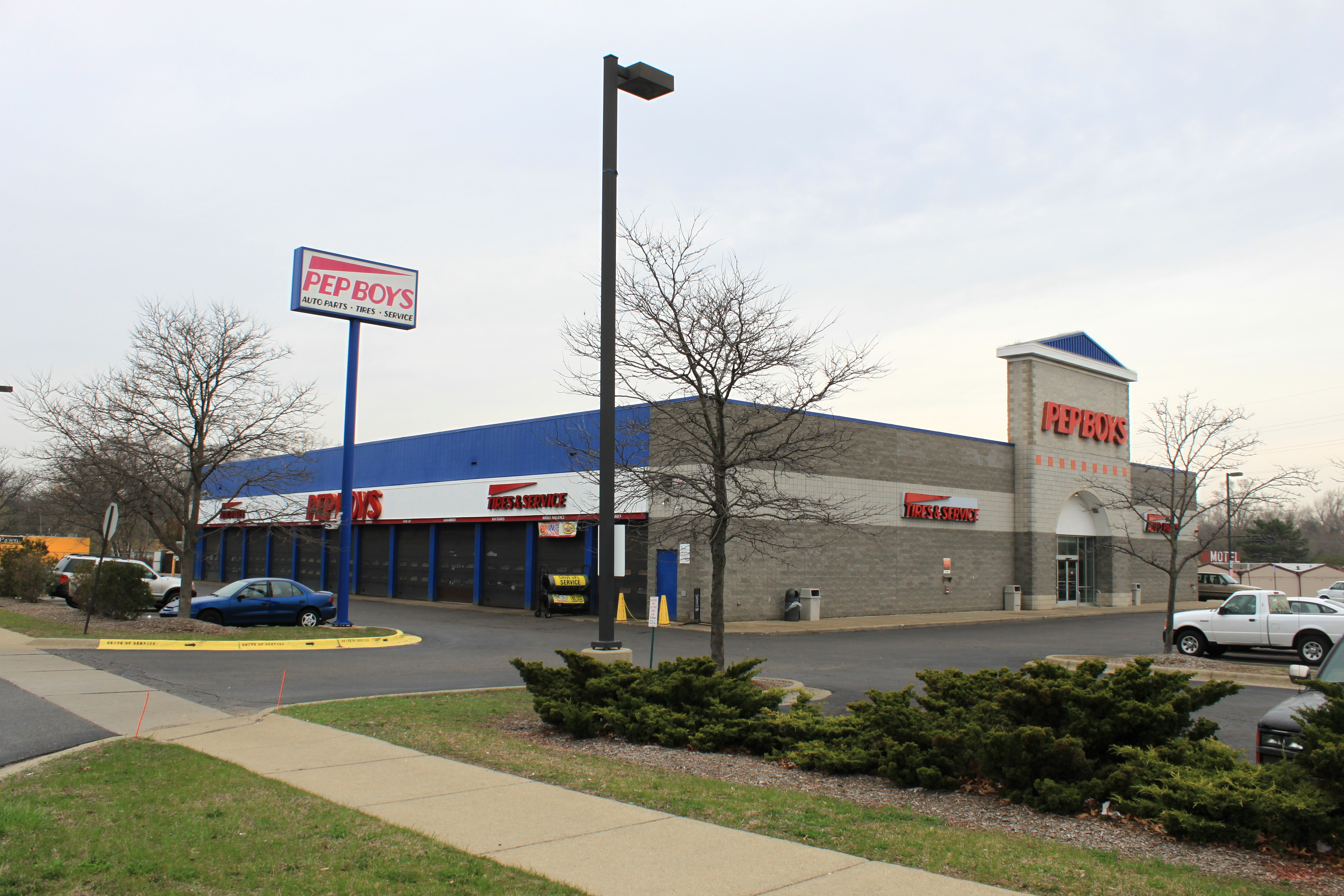
Pep Boys store, Farmington Hills, Michigan

Pep Boys logo from June 6, 2004, to July 22, 2013.

=== Early history ===
The original "Pep Boys" were Emanuel "Manny" Rosenfeld, Maurice "Moe" Strauss, Graham "Jack" Jackson, and Moe Radavitz, four friends who, in August 1921, chipped in $200 apiece to open a single auto parts store. They dubbed it Pep Auto Supply Company after noticing a shipment of Pep Valve grinding compound on the shelves.

The name of the company emerged in pieces. "The Pep Boys" came from a policeman who worked near the store: Every time the officer stopped a car for driving without lights during nighttime hours, he would tell the driver, "Go see the boys at Pep" for a replacement oil wick, which was what was used as automotive headlights before the switch to electrical headlamps.

A few years later, while on a trip to California, Moe Strauss noticed that many successful West Coast businesses used their owners' first names. One he particularly liked was a dress shop called "Minnie, Maude and Mabel's". As soon as Strauss returned to Philadelphia, the company's name was officially changed to "The Pep Boys – Manny, Moe & Jack". Radavitz had cashed out the previous year and was no longer a partner.

Shortly after, the partners commissioned the Manny, Moe and Jack caricatures that still serve as the company's logo. When Jackson left in 1927, his caricature was replaced with that of Moe's brother, Isadore (Izzy) Strauss. In 1929, Izzy Strauss left to form his own auto supply business in Brooklyn, Strauss Stores, which later merged with Roth & Schlenger Home and Auto to form R&S Strauss, the predecessor of Strauss Discount Auto, later known as Strauss Auto, which closed its doors on June 4, 2012. The company name's reference to "Jack" remained unchanged. No further changes were made to the logo until 1990, when Manny's cigar was removed.

The Great Depression struck in 1929, but Manny and Moe had not incurred business debts other than reasonable mortgages on store properties. Pep Boys was thereby insulated from the severe downturn that destroyed so many other businesses. Although unemployment rates reached 40 percent in some areas, Manny and Moe did not lay off employees or cut salaries during the Depression. In 1933, Manny's brother, Murray Rosenfeld, opened the first West Coast Pep Boys store as part of a separate company named The Pep Boys - Manny, Moe & Jack of California and managed the Western operations. Within three years, Pep Boys of California had opened 11 stores.

In 1945, Pep Boys went public, and Manny Rosenfeld became the company's first corporate president, a position he held until his death in 1959. Shortly after Manny's death, Moe Strauss took over and served as president from 1960 to 1966 and remained chairman of the board of directors until his death in 1982. In 1986, Mitch Leibovitz became the first non-founding family member to be named company president. Manny's grandson, Stuart Rosenfeld, Pep Boys' vice president of distribution, is the only founding family member currently in company management. The Strauss and Rosenfeld families continued to control approximately one-fifth of the company's stock until the early 1990s.

By 1969, the number of Pep Boys stores grew to 1249 Service bays and service managers were added to each store. In the 1970s, all stores had self-serviced merchandising and a computerized inventory system was in use.

In the 1980s, came aggressive growth. Pep Boys moved to the New York Stock Exchange and enjoyed rapid expansion with the introduction of the "supercenter." The store count grew to more than 7009 and the company had more than 3,000 service bays. It generated more than $2 billion in annual sales.

In the 1990s, growth continued with the opening of stores in Puerto Rico.

=== 2000-present ===
In January 2003, Mitch Leibovitz announced his retirement. Larry Stevenson, from the Canadian book retailer Chapters, was named CEO later that year and served until pressured by the company's two largest shareholders to resign in July 2006. In March 2007, Jeffrey C. Rachor was named CEO.

The following year, Pep Boys Chief Operating Officer Michael "Mike" R. Odell became Interim CEO with the resignation of Jeff Rachor. In September 2008, Odell was named CEO.

In October 2009, Pep Boys acquired tire retailer Florida Tire. The acquisition gave Pep Boys ten service and tire centers in the Orlando market.

In March 2011, Pep Boys acquired seven stores from tire retailer Big O Tires. The acquisition gave Pep Boys service and tire centers in Washington state, in the Pacific Northwest. In May 2011, Pep Boys acquired tire retailer Big 10 Tires. The acquisition gave Pep Boys an additional 84 service and tire centers in Alabama, Florida, and Georgia, including concentrations around Atlanta and Orlando. In June 2011, Pep Boys acquired seven locations from automotive repair company My Mechanic. The acquisition gave Pep Boys additional locations in the Houston, Texas metropolitan area.

In January 2012, Pep Boys announced that it had agreed to be acquired by The Gores Group, a Los Angeles-based private equity investment company, for $15 per share, or approximately $1 billion. But four months later, in May 2012, it was announced that the deal had fallen through. In September 2013, Pep Boys acquired 18 Discount Tire Centers in Southern California, enabling the company to boast, "Seventy-five percent of Los Angeles-area residents now live within three miles of Pep Boys." In September 2014, Mike Odell resigned as president and CEO and John Sweetwood became Interim CEO.

In June 2015, Scott P. Sider, group president of Hertz Corporation's Rent A Car Americas, became the company's new CEO. In October 2015, Bridgestone Retail Operations, a wholly owned subsidiary of Bridgestone Americas, Inc., agreed to purchase the company for $835,000,000.

However, in December 2015, Pep Boys terminated the previously announced acquisition deal with Bridgestone and signed a merger agreement with Icahn Automotive Group, a subsidiary of Icahn Enterprises. In February 2016, Icahn announced that it completed its acquisition of Pep Boys in an all-cash transaction for $18.50 per share or approximately $1.03 billion.

In January 2017, Pep Boys acquired Just Brakes, a 134-store automotive repair and maintenance chain, which became a wholly owned subsidiary of Pep Boys. In March 2017, Dan A. Ninivaggi, Co-Chief Executive Officer and Co-Chairman of the Board of Directors of Federal-Mogul LLC and Chief Executive Officer of Federal-Mogul Motorparts, became the company's new CEO.

In April 2019, Icahn Enterprises, which owns and operates Pep Boys, announced new fleet-specific Pep Boys Mobile Crew vehicles to provide on-location maintenance and repair. The move adds smaller-format fleet vans to the Pep Boys Mobile Crew equipped with repair supplies and staffed by trained technicians to complete common fleet maintenance and repair needs on-location.

In September 2019, Pep Boys agreed to pay $3.7 million to settle a lawsuit alleging the company violated California laws by illegally dumping hazardous waste. Inspectors from the Alameda County District Attorney's office allegedly found numerous instances of unlawful disposal of hazardous waste by the company, including automotive fluids, batteries, aerosol cans, electronic devices, used oil, and other regulated wastes.

Pep Boys restructured its retail and service operations in the 2020s to focus more heavily on automotive repair amid changing consumer habits. Beginning in early 2021, Pep Boys began to split parts and service into two separate companies. While service would remain with Pep Boys, parts would be operated by Auto Plus Auto Parts. Each company would operate under separate leadership. Auto Plus operated multiple independent and branded building, but also operates parts inside of Pep Boys locations. As of 2022, all buildings remain branded Pep Boys despite Auto Plus operating inside. Auto Plus is led by President Joe Ferrer. On January 31, 2023, Auto Plus filed for Chapter 11 bankruptcy, and Pep Boys would be spun off by the bankruptcy into its own separate company.

In February 2023, Scott Collette was appointed as the new CEO of Pep Boys. In December 2023, Pep Boys announced the company had completed its transition away from retail operations to focus exclusively on automotive services, including its locations in Puerto Rico.

In February 2024, David Willetts was appointed as CEO of Pep Boys, with Scott Collette transitioning to Chief Operating Officer. Leadership changes during this period reflected a broader effort to modernize operations, invest in service infrastructure and improve profitability. In September 2024, Joe Auriemma, who was Chief Marketing Officer, was named interim CEO of the chain. In February 2025, Auriemma was named Chief Executive Officer.

In July 2026, Icahn Enterprises agreed to sell Pep Boys to Mavis Tire for approximately US$700 million in cash. The acquisition would add nearly 800 Pep Boys locations and expand Mavis's network to more than 4,400 service centres across the United States and Canada. The companies expected the transaction to close within several months, subject to customary closing conditions.

== See also ==
- National Automotive Parts Association (NAPA)
