= Movimento dos Atingidos por Barragens =

Movement of People Affected by Dams (Movimento dos Atingidos por Barragens)
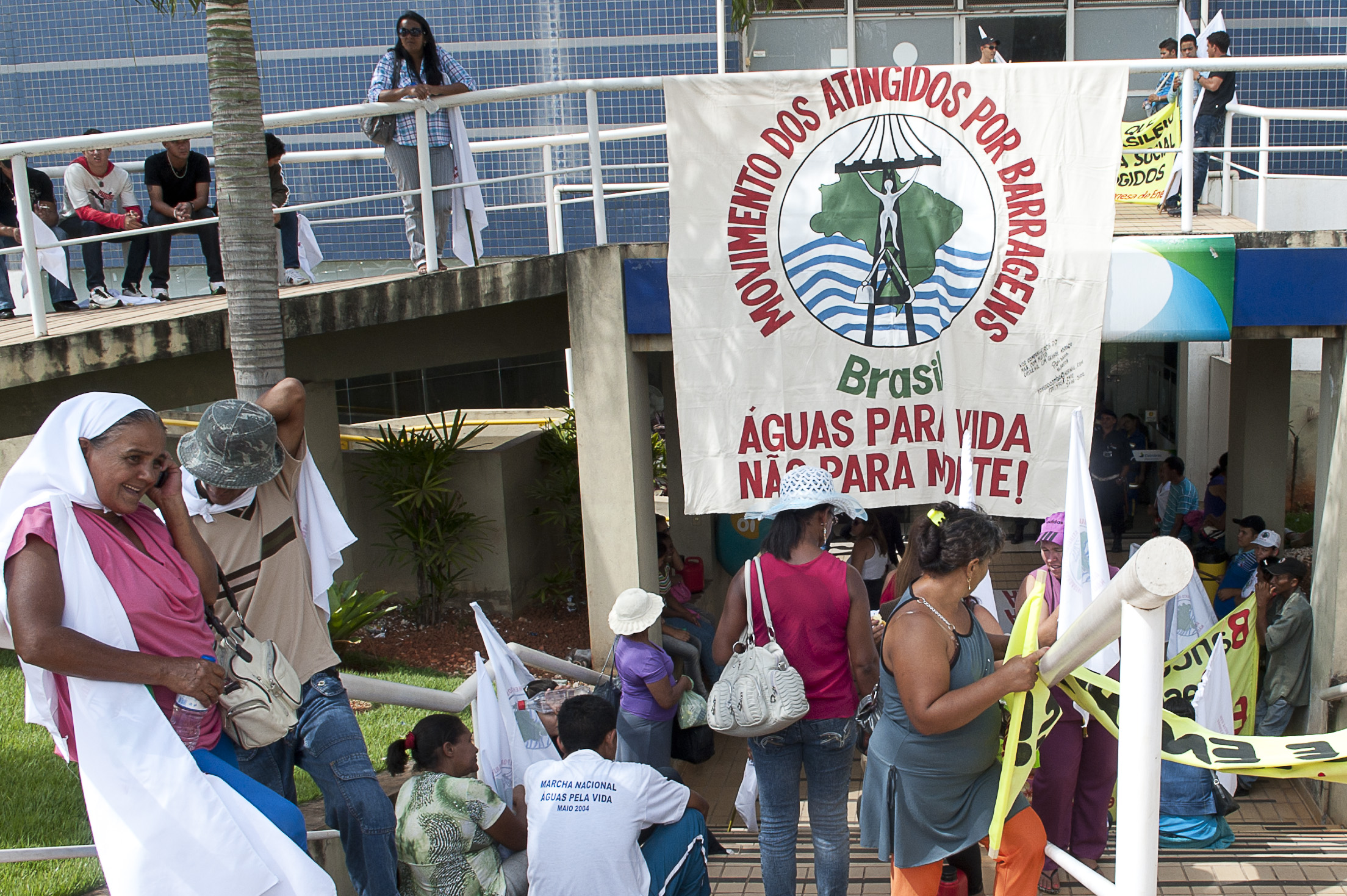
- Headquarters: São Paulo, Brazil

Website
- http://www.mab.org.br

The Movimento dos Atingidos por Barragens (Movement of People Affected by Dams) (MAB) is a Brazilian political organization (social movement) created in the end of the 1970s with the objective of organize and guide the people affected by the dams to pursuit their rights.

The Movement of People Affected by Dams has a long history of resistance, struggles and conquests. It emerged in the 1980s, through experiences of local and regional organization, facing threats and aggressions suffered in the implementation of hydroelectric projects. Later, it became a national organization and, today, in addition to fighting for the rights of those affected, it demands a Popular Energy Project to change all the unjust structures of this society from the roots.

As an organization, the movement is the result of a long work of collective construction, fighting against injustices, the destruction of nature for the maintenance and protection of the way of life of the affected local communities (ethnic and social aspects).

The movement is defined as a movement of national character, autonomous, mass, of struggle, with distinctions of different orders throughout its organization (race, gender, sexual orientation, religion, political party and level of education), with participation and collective protagonism at all levels. Its objective is to organize those affected by dams in Brazil, before, during or after the construction of the projects. It is organized to defend the interests of the populations affected by the generation, distribution and sale of electric energy. The movement's action is guided by principles and values that find in the pedagogy of example and in solidarity among peoples the best way to convince.

== Origin ==
The movement was created from the mobilization of farmers against the construction of hydroelectric plants in the region of Alto Uruguai, in the Brazilian states of Rio Grande do Sul and Santa Catarina. In 1979 when the first studies about the hydroelectric potential of the region were published, the catholic institution Comissão Pastoral da Terra (Pastoral committee for the land) organized the first meetings that ended in the creation of the Dam's committee (Comissão das Barragens), later renamed as Comissão Regional de Atingidos por Barragens (Regional committee of the affected by dams). In 1989 they organized their first national meeting in Goiânia. In March, 1991, the first national congress of affected by dams approved the formal foundation of MAB, their actual name.

== Political acting and Ideology ==
Among MAB claims are the creation of a national bill of rights for the affected by the dams. The movement defends the creation of a national fund of aid to minimize the damages caused against the people by the constructions. The organization is opposed to the Belo Monte Dam project and other similar projects in the Amazon basin. On March 15, 2012, members of MAB signed an agreement with the federal government foreseeing the creation of a chronogram for the resettlement of the signed families. Every year, the organization promotes the "international day of fight against the dams", celebrated by the members in March, 14.

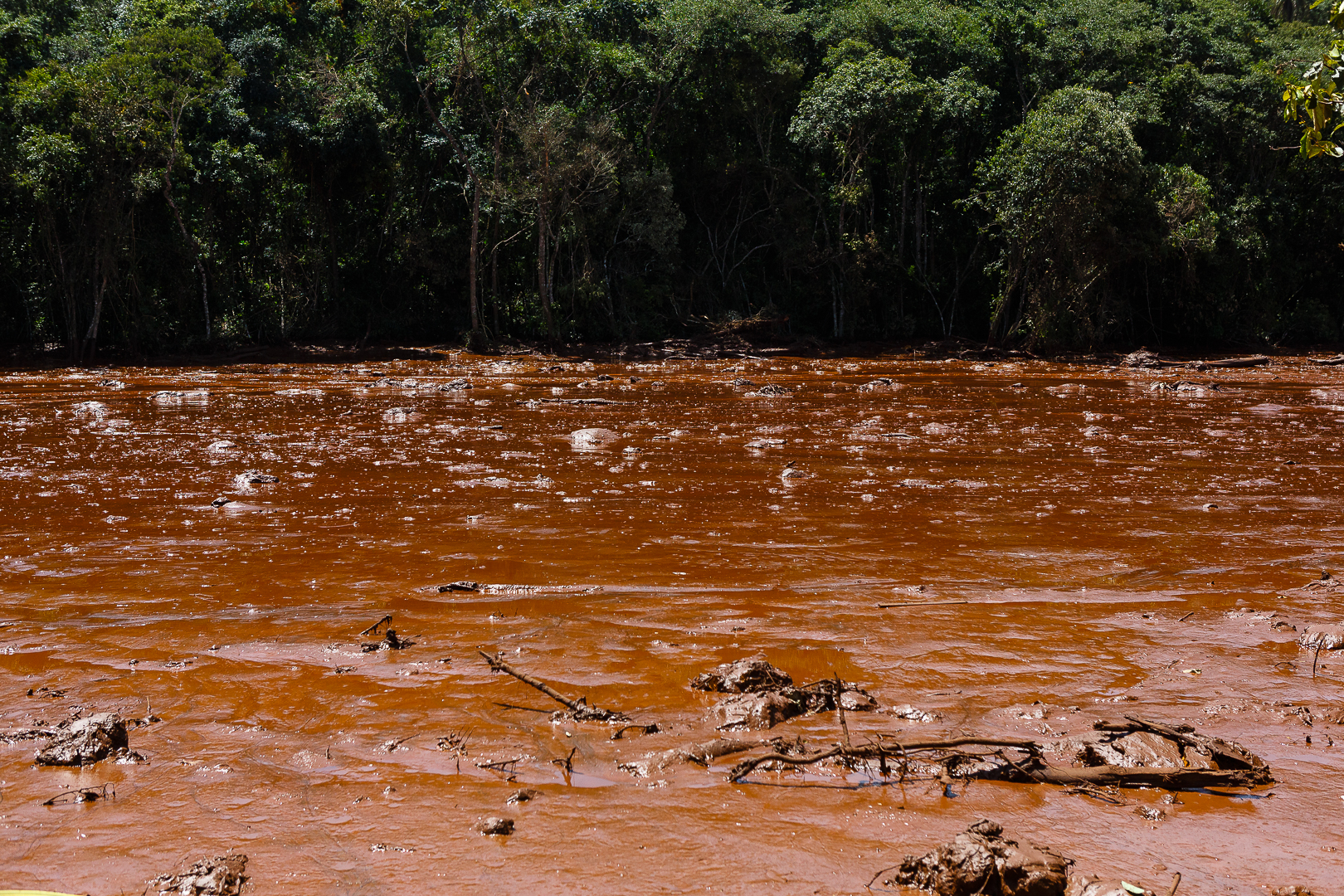
Brumadinho disaster, an example of disregard for nature and society, a mineral tailings dam breaks causing the death of 270 people and environmental damage to rivers and local biological life

Brazilian social movements in the 20th century developed different training and education experiences for their members, as in the case of the Movement of People Affected by Dams (MAB). The Brazilian Communist Party played an important role in national syndicalism (1930s to 1960s), with the contents of political formation at the time referring to "official" Marxism, of Soviet origin.

With the emergence of the "new Brazilian unionism" and of new social movements from the 1970s onwards, Marxist influences and their variants were renewed, above all, in the sphere of intellectual training of the Brazilian popular classes, especially a new ideological matrix, influenced by the "Pedagogy of Autonomy" by Paulo Freire and by Liberation Theology, embodied by the experiences of "popular education" of the period. From the 1990s onwards, the "Movimento dos Sem Terra" (Landless worker's movement), the main organization of Via Campesina Brasil, began to develop its own agenda for the political formation of its members, distancing itself from its ideological bases based on anarchism and seeking to articulate with intellectuals of Marxist lineage.

== Defense of Human Rights ==
The history of the movement arises from the violations of the rights of populations affected by the construction of large dams for the production of electricity, as example, in the case of Itaipu Dam. Such affected populations usually have peasant origins, poor, with little access to the justice system in Brazil. According to the report by the National Human Rights Council, in the construction and operation of dams in Brazil, at least 16 fundamental rights of such populations are systematically violated.

On 11/22/2010, the Council for the Defense of Human Rights, the official body of the Brazilian State in matters of human rights, published - after more than four years of analysis and field visits - a comprehensive report of the Special Commission in charge of investigating complaints about the situation of those "affected by dams in Brazil". Through case studies and analyzing the contextual and socio-environmental elements linked to the theme, the Special Commission (...) found a significant number of human rights violations in the process of construction/implementation of these dams. Finally, the Commission sent a set of recommendations to the Brazilian State in order to repair and/or mitigate the impacts, in addition to pointing out the need to build specific public policies for this population. This document is important not only because it identifies and systematizes complaints of human rights violations - pointing to the existence of a pattern of violations - but above all because it is an official document of the Brazilian State carried out with the effective and decisive participation of the civil society. Furthermore, it is a report published by one of Organs most representative bodies in terms of human rights in Brazil, recognizing this pattern and pointing out necessary compensation measures, which should be binding.

Throughout its trajectory, the movement recognized the need to fight for the realization of the human rights of the affected populations, being one of its fundamental characteristics, the fight for the guarantee of rights. It was only through the struggles waged by those affected that rights such as collective resettlements, cash compensation, receipt of state aid in cash and the pursuit of equal treatment for men and women were made effective.

=== Energy ===
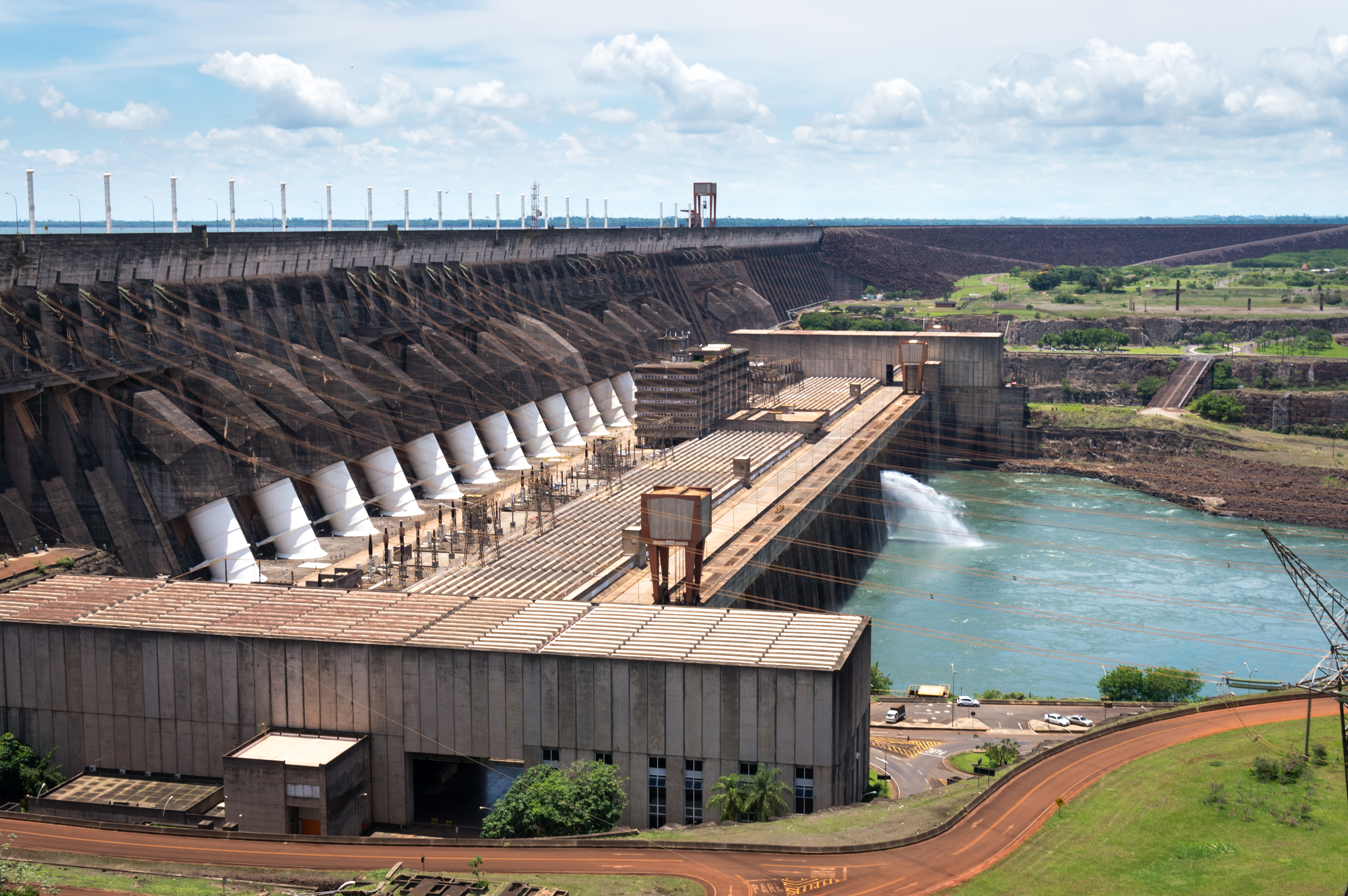
Itaipu Dam - the second largest hydroelectric plant in the world, which caused the relocation of countless local communities during its construction

One of the agendas of the movement is Brazil's national energy policy, which, in the understanding of this social movement, transforms energy into a mere commodity to guarantee the profitability of financial capital. They defend the perspective that "water and energy are not commodities" and, in this sense, they seek to build a popular energy project.

The movement demands that the use of Brazil's water and energy resources be carried out with respect for national sovereignty, with the distribution of socially produced wealth and the need for popular control of government acts and energy policy. Until the beginning of the 1990s, the Brazilian national electricity sector was entirely owned by the State under a legal monopoly regime, with only a single state-owned company which carried out the production, transport and distribution of energy. In the 1990s, these public services were privatized and became private property, under the influence of neoliberalization processes that were taking place throughout Latin America.

The Brazilian territory has one of the largest water potentials in the world, thus, the main source of energy in the country comes from hydroelectric plants, with low financial investment costs, compared to other forms of energy production. Even so, Brazil is among the 10 countries that pay the most expensive energy tariffs. In this sense, the movement emphasizes the need to change the technological matrix and to choose renewable energy sources.

=== Water ===
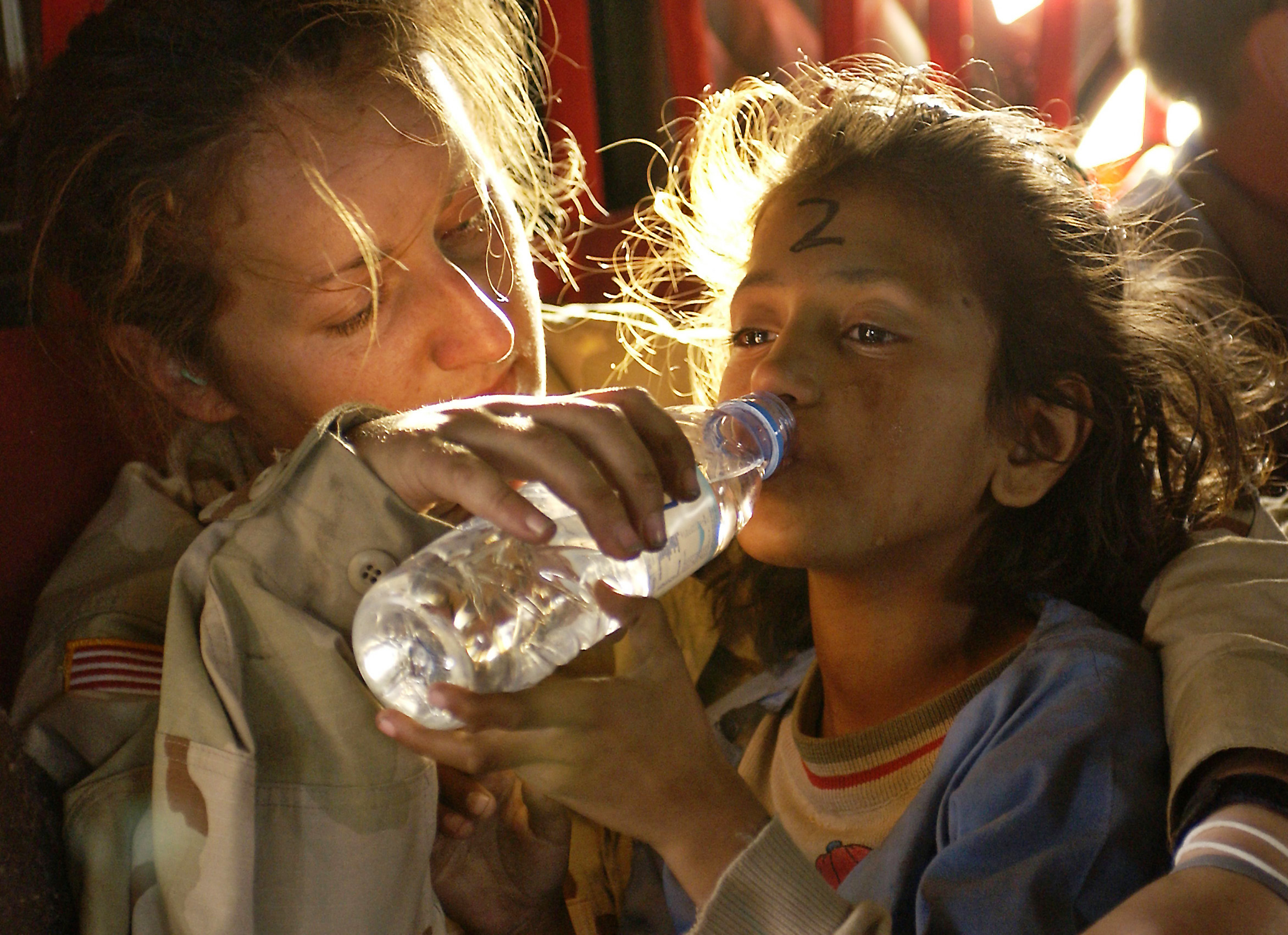
The movement seeks recognition that access to clean water and energy are human rights and not just commodities

The movement understands that water is a basic human need and a fundamental human right and that it should not be commodified or become a commodity. Brazil has the largest freshwater reserve in the world, and we still have a favorable reality, with more than 90% of households being directly connected to water supply networks, most of them (90%) managed by the state and 10% of the control belongs to the private sector. The movement understands that the guarantee of rights is privileged when public services are directly provided by the state and understands the provision of public services carried out by the private sector as negative.

The movement understands that Brazil would be suffering an "attack" by transnational companies, which would be transforming the rights of the people into merchandise. In addition, in rural parts of Brazil, there is an increase in conflicts over access to water, with peasants who produce more than 70% of the food of the Brazilian population on the one hand, and agribusiness, which exports its production to the abroad and consumes 80% of Brazilian water, which, in the words of the movement, harming natural resources and violating the social rights of the population. One of the movement's mottos is "water is for life and not for death". They seek to question and face processes of privatization of water resources and to renationalize national assets that were privatized.

=== Dams ===
The construction of dams in the national territory has repeatedly led to serious violations of human rights, the consequences of which end up accentuating serious social inequalities in Brazil, situations of misery, social disruption (family and individual) of the populations affected by the construction of dams. The negative consequences result from a national policy for the planning, implementation and operation of dams for electricity generation, water supply, accumulation of industrial waste and for multiple uses. The dams cause important social, environmental, economic and cultural impacts in a vast territory and produce hundreds of thousands of affected populations. About the Brazilian electrical system:

Another aspect to be considered is the great pressure that climate change will produce on the most varied ecosystems, in practically all aspects of human life, flora, fauna and changes in hydrological cycles. In this mixed energy model, with private and public participation, the interests of the private sector will always prevail. The State, which should act as a theoretically "neutral" agent in the context of a market economy, ends up becoming more of an economic agent and allied to these groups – State policies become market policies. Thus, investments are public, profits are private and losses are social. The so-called pure private energy model, without state intervention, was not consolidated, with the Brazilian State remaining as a fundamental actor in the electricity sector and allied with economic groups.

A serious example of a break with human rights was the dam failure in Brumadinho on January 25, 2019, which was the biggest work accident in Brazil in terms of loss of human life and the second biggest industrial disaster of the century. It was one of the biggest environmental disasters for mining in the country, after the dam collapsed in Mariana. Controlled by Vale Company, the tailings dam was classified as "low risk" and "high potential for damage" by the company. Accumulating the tailings of an iron mine, it was located in the "Ferro-Carvão" stream in the municipality of Brumadinho, state of Minas Gerais. The industrial disaster claimed the lives of 270 people, including six missing. The tragedy caused Brazil to become the country with the highest number of deaths in this type of accident, in addition to two other disasters with human losses or serious environmental damage: the rupture of the Herculano Mining Dam, in Itabirito (2014, with three deaths) and the rupture of the dam in Mariana (2015, with nineteen deaths).

The intensity, severity and extent of negative impacts caused by hydroelectric plants vary from case to case, according to regional characteristics, size of the plants, age of the dam, type of reservoir (water or industrial waste), ownership, construction and operation of the plant (companies state, mixed and private – national and international).

According to the Dam Safety Report published in 2018 by the National Water Resources Agency, there are 17,604 dams registered in the 32 supervisory bodies of the Brazilian state, at the municipal, state and federal level. To date, around 5,086 dams have been classified by Risk Category and 6,577 dams by Associated Potential Damage, with 909 dams classified simultaneously as high Risk Category and Associated Potential Damage. Brazil has a large number of dams and the negative impacts associated with these projects are relevant, resulting from the lack of safety in dams and the pattern of violation of the rights of those affected.

=== Amazon Rainforest ===
With the worsening of the crises (economic and climatic) in recent years, the Amazon has suffered more and more, with severe damage to its biodiversity and the lives of local communities. The context of intensive extraction of natural resources, deforestation, fires, as well as processes of privatization of local water resources. The current global economic model has reinforced the position of the Amazon as a source of cheap mineral and energy resources and the destruction of the forest and its transformation into a new agricultural frontier, for the export of commodities, carried out by transnational companies.

Local populations, however, have had few benefits from globalization, only an increase in their misery and an increase in cases of violence, including neglect on the part of the Brazilian federal government. In this sense, the movement of those affected by dams seeks to build a development model for the Amazon in which the lives of local populations come first, privileging the distribution of wealth and its development without destroying nature and using natural resources. strategic resources for the general improvement of the population's living conditions.

=== International action of the movement ===
The social movement estimates that more than 800,000 dams have already been built on the planet and that their reservoirs already cover about 1% of the planet's surface.

At the same time, the number of people who have had to leave the place where they live due to the flooding of territories for the production of hydropower in the last 20 years is estimated at more than 40 million people, and most of these people are of indigenous origin. The consequences of the construction of dams appear over time: forest degradation, drastic reduction in fishing, emission of gases that contribute to the greenhouse effect and global warming, risks of earthquakes, climate change and biological death of water courses.

In addition, the construction of dams is based on borrowing by local governments, causing the indebtedness of the economies of poor nations such as Brazil. As a result, MAB sought articulation at the international level with other similar institutions, through international meetings of those affected, and in Latin America, especially through the "Movimiento de Afectados por Represas (MAR), in Spanish.
