= Harris Pogust =

American lawyer (born 1963)

Harris Pogust (born 1963) is an American attorney, who is currently the Chairman of the international law firm Pogust Goodhead.

== Early life and education ==
Pogust was born in New Jersey. He attended the Widener University School of Law at Rutgers University.

== Career ==
Pogust worked at New Jersey law firm, Sherman, Silverstein, Kohl, Rose & Podolsky. Here, he played a role in New Jersey's first-class action lawsuit related to Y2K and a class-action lawsuit involving several companies including Firestone Tire & Rubber Co.

In 2005, Pogust left Sherman to establish the plaintiff law firm, Pogust, Braslow & Millrood, later known as Pogust Millrood.

In 2009, Pogust also represented the plaintiffs in a case in which US Airways and Prime Flight Aviation Services was accused of cheating skycaps out of wages. In 2015, Pogust represented professional wrestlers Vito LoGrasso and Evan Singleton, who sought to hold World Wrestling Entertainment legally responsible for the brain damage that they suffered.

In 2018, Pogust became a founding partner in SPG Law, later to become PGMBM, and subsequently Pogust Goodhead. As part of PGMBM, Pogust oversaw the settlement of a group action claim against British Airways for a 2018 data breach that affected 420,000 individuals. Pogust also represented UK women who received Essure contraceptive implants from Bayer AG in an injury lawsuit against Bayer in 2020.

As part of Pogust Goodhead, Pogust also oversaw the UK's largest opt-in class action lawsuit against BHP and Vale, the two mining companies involved in the collapse of the Fundão tailings dam at the Samarco Mariana mine complex in 2015.
