= Ferrous Resources =

- Industry: Mining
- Headquarters: Belo Horizonte, Brazil
- Area served: Minas Gerais, Espírito Santo, Rio de Janeiro e Bahia
- Website: ferrous.com.br

Ferrous Resources Ltda. is a Brazilian mining company engaged in the research, exploration, exploitation, processing and marketing of iron ore.

Founded in 2007, Ferrous Resources is based in Belo Horizonte (MG). Ferrous has five mines in Minas Gerais and is currently exploring the viability of a potential mineral asset in Bahia. The company is also working on the implementation of an integrated logistics system, which includes the development of a significant slurry pipeline across three Brazilian states, as well as the construction of a new port terminal in Espírito Santo.

== Performance and geographical footprint ==
Ferrous’ mineral assets are located in the Iron Quadrangle in Minas Gerais and in Coração de Maria, Bahia. They are accessed and processed by the following mines:

- Serrinha and Esperança in the city of Brumadinho (MG)
- Viga, in Congonhas (MG)
- Viga Norte, in Itabirito (MG)
- Santanense, in Itatiaiuçu (MG)
- Jacuípe, in Coração de Maria (BA)

The quantity of mineral resources in these areas allows Ferrous to produce a significant amount of iron ore. The firm aims to increase their rate of production to 17 million tons per year by 2016 and 40 million tons per year by 2026.

To ensure the successful operation of the mines of the Iron Quadrangle, Ferrous has also embarked on the construction of a 400 km slurry pipeline.

== Recent news ==
In September 2013, Ferrous Resources sold an $80 million stake (14.4%) in the firm to Eastern European mining firm Ferrexpo.

In 2019, Ferrous Resources was acquired by Vale S.A., a global mining company headquartered in Brazil. Vale said the "completion of this acquisition is aligned with Vale’s strategy of maximizing the flight to quality in the Iron Ore business." However, a temporary stop in the operations of Vale was made because of some inconsistency in documents.
