= Itabirite =

Type of metamorphic rock

Itabirite, also called banded-quartz hematite or hematite schist, is a foliated, metamorphosed oxide-facies iron formation in which the original chert or jasper bands have been recrystallized into macroscopically distinguishable grains of quartz and the iron is present as thin layers of hematite, magnetite, or martite (pseudomorphs of hematite after magnetite).

The term was originally applied in Itabirito (Pico de Itabirito), in the state of Minas Gerais and southern part of Belo Horizonte, Brazil, to a high-grade, massive specular hematite ore (66% iron) associated with a schistose rock composed of granular quartz and scaly hematite. The term is now widely used outside Brazil.
