= Mariana dam disaster =

2015 environmental disaster in Brazil

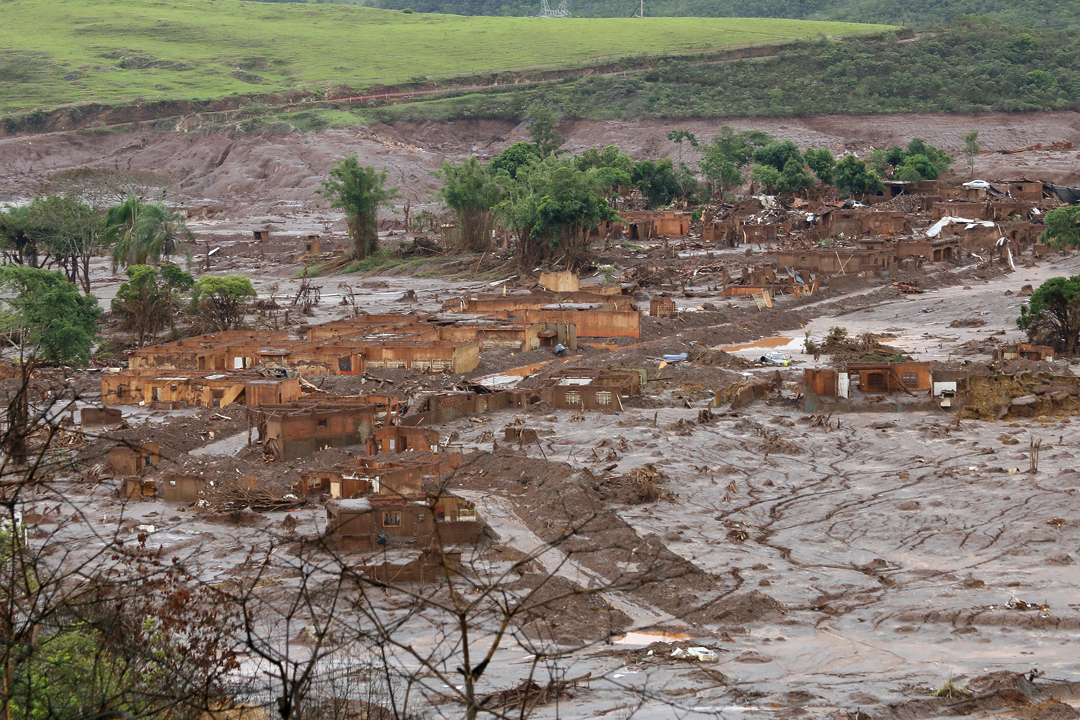
- The village of Bento Rodrigues after the disaster

- Location within Minas Gerais Location within Brazil
- Date: 5 November 2015
- Time: c. 3:30 pm BRT
- Location: Germano mine complex, Mariana, Minas Gerais, Brazil; 20°13′53″S 43°26′33″W
- Also known as: Samarco dam collapse
- Type: Dam failure
- Cause: Unknown
- Participants: Samarco (joint-venture between Vale and BHP Billiton)
- Deaths: 19
- Injuries: 16+
- Property damage: Two villages devastated, around 200 homes destroyed
- Verdict: High Court of Justice ruled BHP liable

The Mariana dam disaster was an environmental disaster near Mariana, Minas Gerais, Brazil. On 5 November 2015, the Fundão tailings dam at the Germano iron ore mine of the Samarco Mariana Mining Complex near Mariana, suffered a catastrophic failure, resulting in flooding that devastated the downstream villages of Bento Rodrigues and Paracatu de Baixo (40 km (25 mi) from Bento Rodrigues), killing 19 people. The extent of the damage caused by the tailings dam collapse is the largest ever recorded, with pollutants spread along 668 kilometres (415 mi) of watercourses.

The failure of the dam released 43.7 million cubic metres (1.54 billion cubic feet) of mine tailings into the Doce River, causing a toxic brown mudflow to pollute the river and beaches near the mouth when it reached the Atlantic Ocean 17 days later. The disaster created a humanitarian crisis as hundreds were displaced and cities along the Doce River suffered water shortages when their water supplies were polluted.

The total impact of the disaster, including the reason for failure and the environmental consequences, are officially under investigation and remain unclear. The owner of the Bento Rodrigues dam, Samarco, was subject to extensive litigation and government sanctions. In 2016, charges of manslaughter and environmental damage were filed against 21 executives, including Samarco's former CEO and representatives from Samarco's owners, Vale and BHP Billiton, on its board of directors. Controversy over the disaster grew after a 2013 internal report, which indicated structural issues with the dam, was leaked.

On 6 November 2024, the President of the Brazilian Supreme Federal Court (STF), Luis Roberto Barroso, granted approval to a R$170 billion (approximately US$30 billion) compensation agreement to repair the damages caused by the disaster, signed between the mining companies and the Brazilian government.

On 14 November 2025, the High Court in England ruled that BHP Group was strictly liable for the disaster, citing negligence, technical warnings and lack of essential studies, which permitted the height of the dam to increase beyond safe levels.

== Background ==
The Fundão tailings dam was constructed and owned by Samarco, a mining company, near Mariana, a municipality 67 kilometres (42 mi) southeast of Belo Horizonte, in the state of Minas Gerais, Brazil. The tailings dam was built by Samarco to accommodate the waste resulting from the extraction of iron ore taken from the extensive Germano mine, located in the Mariana district of Santa Rita Durão. The Fundão dam was constructed in hills near the village and subdistrict of Bento Rodrigues, located 14 km (8.7 mi) north of Mariana city.

== Incident ==
At approximately 3:30 pm on 5 November 2015, the Fundão dam began to leak. Immediately, a team of outsourced employees was sent to the scene, and they tried to mitigate the leak by deflating part of the reservoir. At around 4:20 pm, a rupture occurred, releasing a large volume of toxic sludge into the Santarém river valley. Bento Rodrigues, which lies 2.5 km (1.6 mi) away in the valley below the dam, was almost entirely flooded by the cascade of toxic water and mud.

The incident rendered Bento Rodrigues completely inaccessible by road, hindering firefighters' rescue efforts. The only available method of transport into or out of the location was via helicopter. There was a school in the area where the flood occurred, and the teachers were able to remove the students before the school was flooded by the toxic sludge.

Other villages and districts in the Gualaxo river valley were also severely affected by the disaster. The midtown area of Barra Longa, a small city located 60 kilometres (37 mi) from Mariana, had residential and commercial buildings flooded by the mud; the district of Gesteira, built on the banks of Gualaxo river, also had houses completely destroyed by the flood; some of the district residents were rescued by helicopter.

Samarco and the neighbouring communities did not have a contingency plan or evacuation routes in the event of dam failure. Had such plans existed, residents may have been able to evacuate in a timely manner to more secure regions. Around 600 people were evacuated to Mariana, and troops of the Brazilian Armed Forces were deployed to assist.

== Impact ==
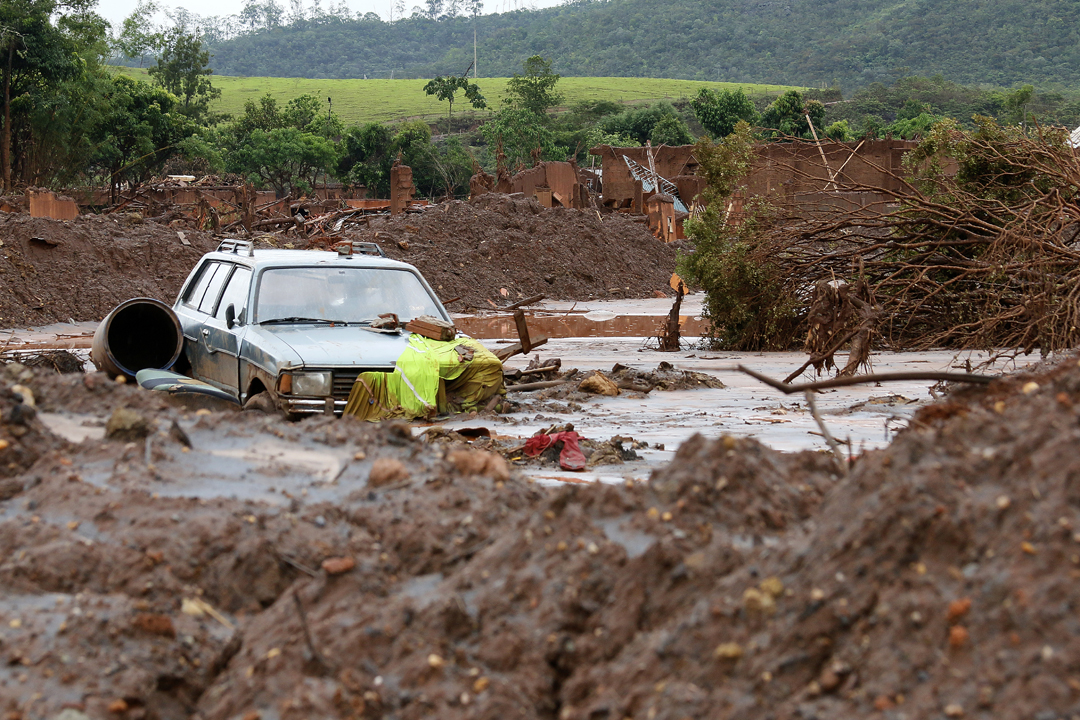
An abandoned car caught in the mudflow amidst the ruins of Bento Rodrigues

According to a United Nations report, the tailings slurry traveled 620 km (390 mi) downriver, eventually reaching the Atlantic Ocean. Nineteen people were killed, entire fish populations were killed immediately when the slurry buried them or clogged their gills, and the mudflow destroyed 1,469 hectares (3,630 acres) of riparian forest.

=== Contamination of the Doce River ===
Satellite images of Bento Rodrigues and the Germano mine before and after the disaster, displaying the flooding and pollution of the Doce River

At around 6:30 pm on 5 November, the tailings of iron ore reached the Doce River. The river basin has a drainage area of about 86,700 km^{2} (33,500 sq mi), with 86% in Minas Gerais and Espírito Santo. In total, the river covers 230 municipalities that use its bed for subsistence. The waste also reached the hydroelectric power plant of Risoleta Neves in Santa Cruz do Escalvado within 100 kilometres of Mariana. According to the company that runs the power plant, its functioning was not affected.

On 9 November, the city of Governador Valadares stopped the water intakes due to the mud on the Doce River. The next day, a State of Public Calamity was decreed in response to the water shortage in the city. According to analyses carried out in the city, the mud contains greater than acceptable concentrations of heavy metals, substances harmful to health, such as arsenic, lead and mercury.

There are concerns about contamination of the nearby Rio Gualaxo do Norte, a tributary of the Doce River, due to the toxic substances stored at the facility.

=== Contamination of southern Atlantic Ocean ===
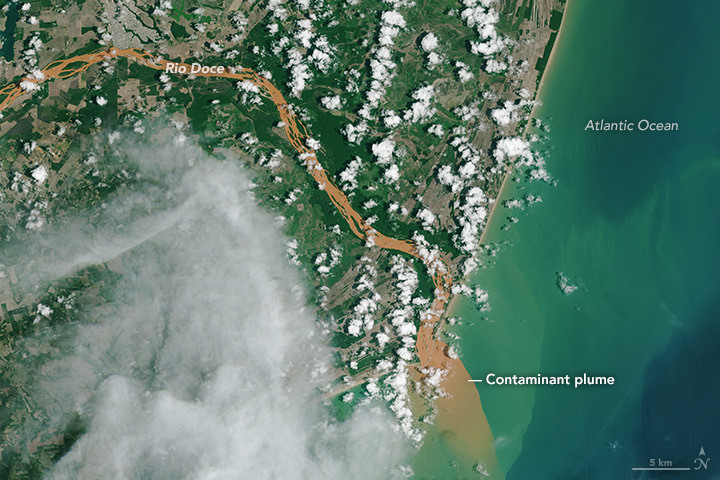
Satellite image of the mouth of the Doce River in Linhares, Espírito Santo, where fine waste in suspension reached the southern Atlantic Ocean

On 22 November, fine waste particles in suspension reached the Atlantic Ocean.

On 7 January 2016, fine waste particles reached the southern Bahia littoral zone. Environmentalists are monitoring the impact to the Abrolhos Marine National Park wildlife. The park is considered of vital importance to the Brazilian ecosystem since it hosts the greatest marine biodiversity in the whole southern Atlantic Ocean.

== Aftermath ==
=== Investigation of the causes ===
On the first quarter of November 2015, the Brazilian Chamber of Deputies and the state chambers of Minas Gerais and Espírito Santo each created a special commission to investigate the collapse. According to the media reports, many of the deputies that composed such commissions had received donations from Vale to finance their campaigns. Such donations, up to R$2.6 million are legal, and were reported by the then-candidates to the Brazilian Election Justice. However, critics argued that the deputies' participation was clearly biased.

In January 2016, leaked internal documents from 14 months before the disaster revealed that Samarco had been warned about the possibility of the dam collapsing. Joaquim Pimenta de Ávila, an engineer who was regarded as one of the foremost tailing dam engineers in Brazil, had been contracted by Samarco between 2008 and 2012 to design and oversee the construction of the Fundão dam.

From 2013, Ávila was hired part-time as a consultant to inspect the dam, and a technical report he wrote from September 2014 lists severe structural problems on the dam (in the form of cracks) and measures to mitigate them, the main one being the construction of a buttress. Ávila originally designed the dam in 2006, and it was erected by construction firm Camter. However, construction defects within the dam led to a design change by Camter that allowed for more saturation. Samarco claimed to have implemented all the recommendations from Ávila, and that the dam was in the process of being heightened when the impoundment reached its maximum holding capacity and began to leak. However, Samarco failed to comment specifically about the buttress, and claims that it was never warned about the severity of the structural damages, nor about the imminence of a catastrophic failure.

In August 2016, the report of an investigation panel constituted by Samarco and its shareholders was published online. The investigation panel findings indicated that the liquefaction flowsliding resulted from multiple factors, including an increase in the saturation of the tailings due to modifications in the design of the dam and the presence of soft slimes in unintended areas on the left abutment of the dam. Another study indicated that the dam failure could not be predicted based on simple limit equilibrium analyses and that only a complex failure mechanism would explain the dam collapse.

=== Sanctions to Samarco ===
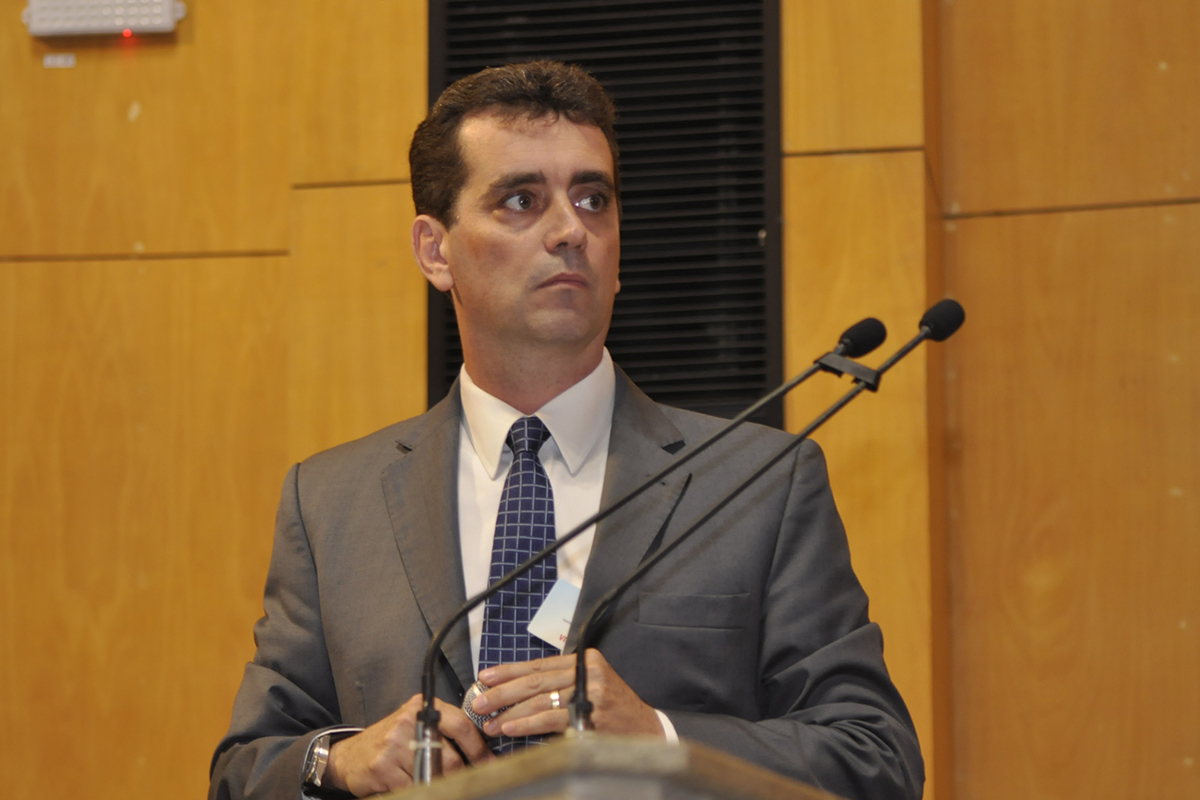
Samarco president Ricardo Vescovi

The Minas Gerais government suspended Samarco's activities immediately after the disaster.

Next, the Brazilian government fined Samarco R$250 million (US$66.3 million) for the incident. The fine was preliminary and was expected to be increased if the two companies were found guilty of water pollution and damages.

Succumbing to external pressure, BHP Billiton, together with Vale and Samarco, signed in 2016 an agreement with the Brazilian federal and state authorities. In January 2016, the Brazilian government and Samarco reached an agreement and a fine of R$20 billion (US$4.8 billion) was issued. The penalty did not include compensation to people affected by the disaster, and the cost of recovering the polluted area. By July 2016, BHP made a provision of US$2.3-2.5 billion for costs associated with the compensation agreement between Samarco's shareholders (BHP and Vale) and Brazilian federal, state and municipal authorities.

=== Legal consequences ===
Vale and BHP Billiton own Samarco as a joint venture, with each company possessing a 50% stake. As of 2018, the companies remain in negotiations with Brazilian authorities in efforts to settle out of court.

In March 2016, Samarco agreed to pay US$2.3 billion in compensation. Australia's ABC reported that Samarco and its joint venture partners would "establish a foundation to develop and execute environmental and socio-economic programs to restore the environment, local communities and social conditions of the affected areas."

In June 2016, an AUD$8 billion civil suit which was reinstated by Brazil's Superior Court after the original agreement was suspended. BHP, along with its Samarco joint venture partner Vale, face a separate $55 billion suit lodged by federal prosecutors.

In October 2016 it was reported that Brazilian prosecutors had filed manslaughter and environmental charges against 21 people including top executives of Samarco's Parent Companies: BHP Billiton, an Anglo-Australian multinational mining, metals and petroleum company headquartered in Melbourne, Australia and the world's largest mining company, and Vale, the third-largest mining company in the world and the Public Eye People's Worst Company award winner of 2012.

In June 2018, Samarco, Vale and BHP signed an agreement to drop a US$7 billion lawsuit and allow two years for the companies to address the greater US$55 billion suit seeking social, environmental and economic compensation.

==== Class action lawsuits ====
In August 2018, BHP settled a class action suit in the US for US$50 million, with no admission of liability. At the same time, it was facing a class action lawsuit from shareholders in Australia related to the dam failure and losses incurred by shareholders following company disclosures to the market regarding the safety of the dam. The class action is expected to be one of the largest in Australian history, with 30,000 BHP shareholders involved, with a combined shareholding of 330 million shares, valued at over AU$10 billion (at 30 October 2018).

In November 2018, UK-based legal firm SPG Law, now Pogust Goodhead, filed a US$5 billion group action in the High Court of Justice at Liverpool under Brazilian law against BHP Billiton on behalf of 235,000 Brazilian individuals and organisations, including municipal governments, utility companies, indigenous tribes and the Catholic Church. The lawsuit is one of the biggest legal claims ever filed in a British court. The case, which has been the subject of jurisdictional challenge, was delayed due to the COVID-19 pandemic.

In November 2020, in the High Court sitting in Manchester, the claims were struck out on the grounds that they amounted to an abuse of the process of the court. On 27 July 2021, the Court of Appeal granted the claimants leave to appeal against the November 2020 ruling. In July 2022, the Court of Appeal allowed the appeal opening the way for the case to proceed in the English courts. In 2023, it was announced that Pogust Goodhead had secured a £450m investment from US-based firm Gramercy Funds Management to help fund the Mariana case and "resolve existing cases successfully".

In March 2023, it was reported that BHP faces an enlarged class-action lawsuit seeking damages of up to U$65 billion for its role in the dam collapse, with the number of claimants more than tripling to 700,000. Approximately 100,000 claimants subsequently exited the claim. Of the remaining 600,000 claimants, 200,000 had already received a total of US$2 billion in compensation through Brazilian proceedings. In April 2024, it was reported that payouts from the court action were to be delayed past the original claimant forecasts, with the case now expected to be completed in 2027. During the trial, it emerged that claims had been filed for oily hair, chickenpox, Alzheimer's disease, and flowers not being as beautiful as before. Lawyers fees in the case are projected to exceed US$680 million. BHP continues to deny the claim in its entirety. In August 2025, BHP Group and Vale had offered US$1.4 billion to settle the case.

On 14 November 2025, High Court judge Finola O'Farrell ruled BHP strictly liable for the disaster. O'Farrell affirmed that "the risk of collapse of the dam was foreseeable", adding: "It is inconceivable that a decision would have been taken to continue raising the height of the dam in those circumstances and the collapse could have been averted". Furthermore, the judge cited serious negligence, as technical warnings were ignored and essential studies were not conducted, allowing the dam to continue being raised even in the face of clear signs of risk. The group stated it intends to appeal over the decision. The amount of compensation to be paid will be determined in another trial, scheduled for October 2026. Amid the 2025 United Nations Climate Change Conference held in the Brazilian city of Belém, the Movimento dos Atingidos por Barragens (Movement of People Affected by Dams—MAB) celebrated the decision: "It actually legitimises the struggle. And the fact that the Court finds BHP liable shows that they really have to pay and have to make reparations to those affected."

=== Government settlement agreement ===
On 25 October 2024, mining companies BHP and Vale signed an agreement with the Brazilian government to pay nearly US$30 billion in compensation over the Mariana Dam collapse. The terms include $18 billion in funding for public authorities and $5.6 billion in additional compensation, resettlement, and environment restoration. The signing ceremony was attended by Brazilian President Luiz Inacio Lula de Silva.

There is speculation that the agreement could end more than one hundred lawsuits against the mining companies in Brazil, and possibly limit legal action abroad. Vale's vice-president for corporate and external affairs, Alexandre D'Ambrosio, indicated that the compensation deal undermines the foundation of the London case.

On 6 November 2024, the Supreme Federal Court (STF) unanimously validated the agreement reached by the federal government, the states of Minas Gerais, Espírito Santo and mining companies to repair the damage caused by the Mariana dam collapse.

== Reactions ==
=== National ===
The city immediately began a campaign to collect donations for the homeless, stressing the urgent need for donations of toothbrushes, towels, glasses, cutlery, disposable dishes and especially drinking water. A special bank account was opened to receive cash donations. All municipal events since the day of the disaster until 16 November were canceled. The note from the Mayor's Office said that "at this point, the city of Mariana is focused on rescue work and support".

The Federal Government, through the Minister's Chief of Staff, Jaques Wagner, put the Federal forces at the disposal of the State of Minas Gerais. The Minister came into contact with the Governor, Fernando Pimentel, to put the Federal forces. Jaques Wagner announced President Dilma Rousseff by accident before loading it back from a trip to Brazil to Brasília.

The Roman Catholic Archdiocese of Mariana said: "We express our most heartfelt sympathy to the families who have had their homes and property destroyed and those who mourn the death of their loved ones, victims of this disaster of incalculable proportions. The point is to unite efforts to minimise the distress and suffering of all those affected by this tragedy. We call upon our communities to provide support to victims. [...]. We pray to God to strengthen and comfort, with your generous love, all who have been affected by this accident". The Diocese of Itabira and Three Lakes and the East Regional II CNBB, comprising the territories of the States of Minas Gerais and Espírito Santo, also issued notes of solidarity with those affected by tragedy.

A football match between Cruzeiro and São Paulo on 8 November in Belo Horizonte hosted a collection of resources to help the victims.

=== International ===
A United Nations report shows evidence of the disaster, "50 million tons of iron ore waste, contained high levels of toxic heavy metals and other toxic chemicals in the river Doce". In fact, the scale of the environmental damage is the equivalent of 20,000 Olympic swimming pools of toxic mud waste contaminating the soil, rivers and water system of an area covering over 850 km. The authors stressed that actions taken by the Brazilian government, Vale and BHP Billiton to prevent harm were insufficient. On the other hand, BHP claims that although heavy metals were found, the difference in concentration was found not to differ significantly from that found in the 2010 geologic survey. The company said the tailings that entered the Rio Doce were composed of clay and silt from the processing of earth containing iron ore, which is naturally abundant in the region.

The French spokesman for the Ministry of Foreign Affairs, and Romain Nadal expressed their condolences. A spokesman commented, "We were told with emotion of the disruption of the mining dams in the State of Minas Gerais in the Southeast region."

American band Pearl Jam, who performed in Belo Horizonte on 20 November 2015, promised to donate the proceeds of the concert to victims of the disaster. Singer Eddie Vedder gave a speech calling for harsh punishments to be applied to Samarco and others involved.

== See also ==
- List of non-water floods
- Brumadinho dam disaster – a 2019 tailings dam failure in Brumadinho, Brazil, killing 270 people
