= Santa Cruz do Escalvado =

Municipality in Minas Gerais, Brazil

Coordinates: 20°14′9″S 42°48′50″W

- Municipality
- Interactive map of Santa Cruz do Escalvado
- Country: Brazil
- State: Minas Gerais
- Region: Southeast
- Time zone: UTC−3 (BRT)

Location of Santa Cruz do Escalvado within Minas Gerais

Santa Cruz do Escalvado is a Brazilian municipality located in the state of Minas Gerais. The city belongs to the mesoregion of Zona da Mata and to the microregion of Ponte Nova. As of 2020, the estimated population was 4,725.

== See also ==
- List of municipalities in Minas Gerais
