= Gloria (given name) =

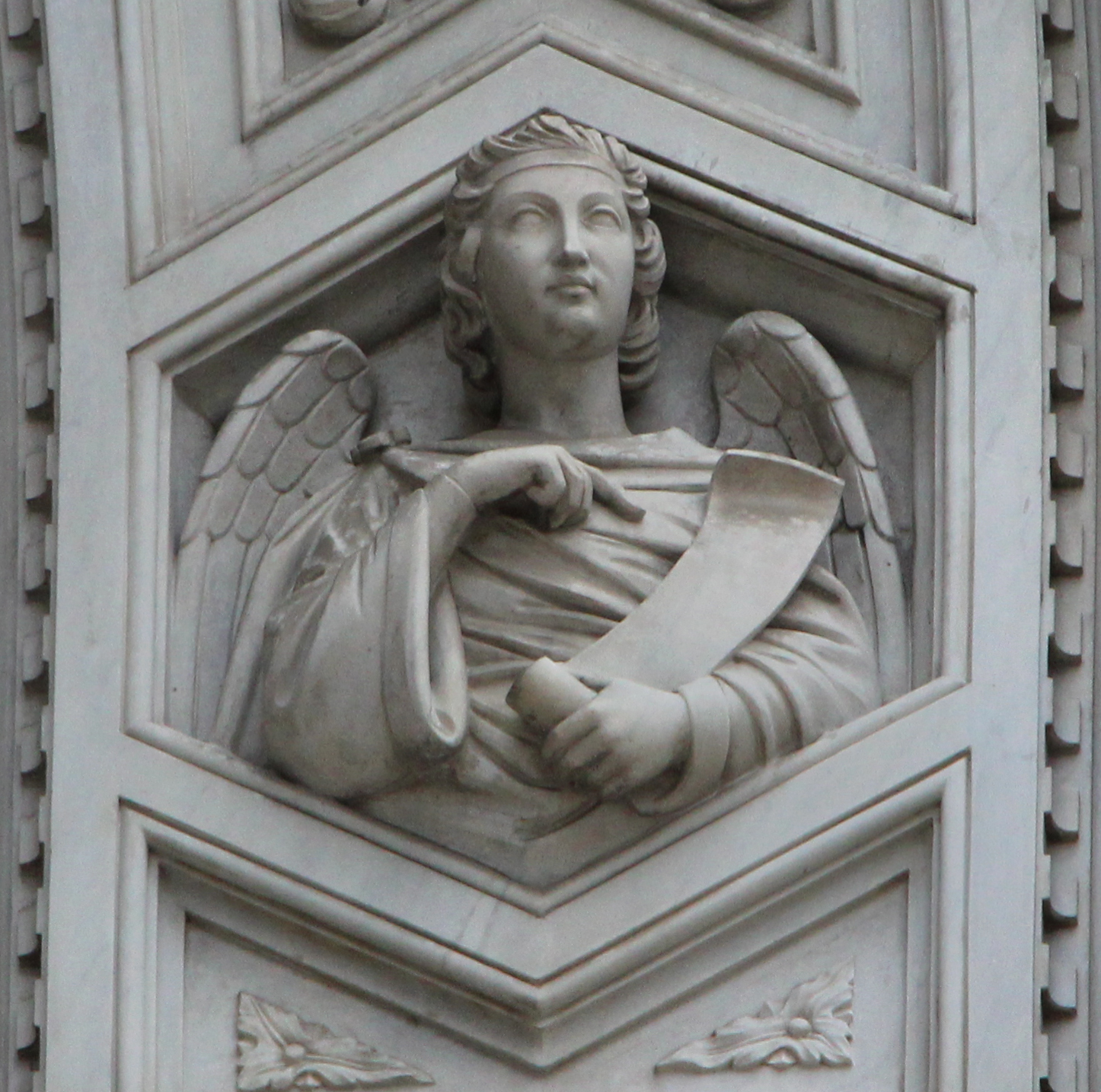
- Angel of glory, a panel on the facade of Santa Maria del Fiore in Florence, Italy, by Giovanni Paganucci.
- Gender: female

Origin
- Language: Latin
- Origin: Latin glōria
- Meaning: glory

Other names
- Variant form: glōriae

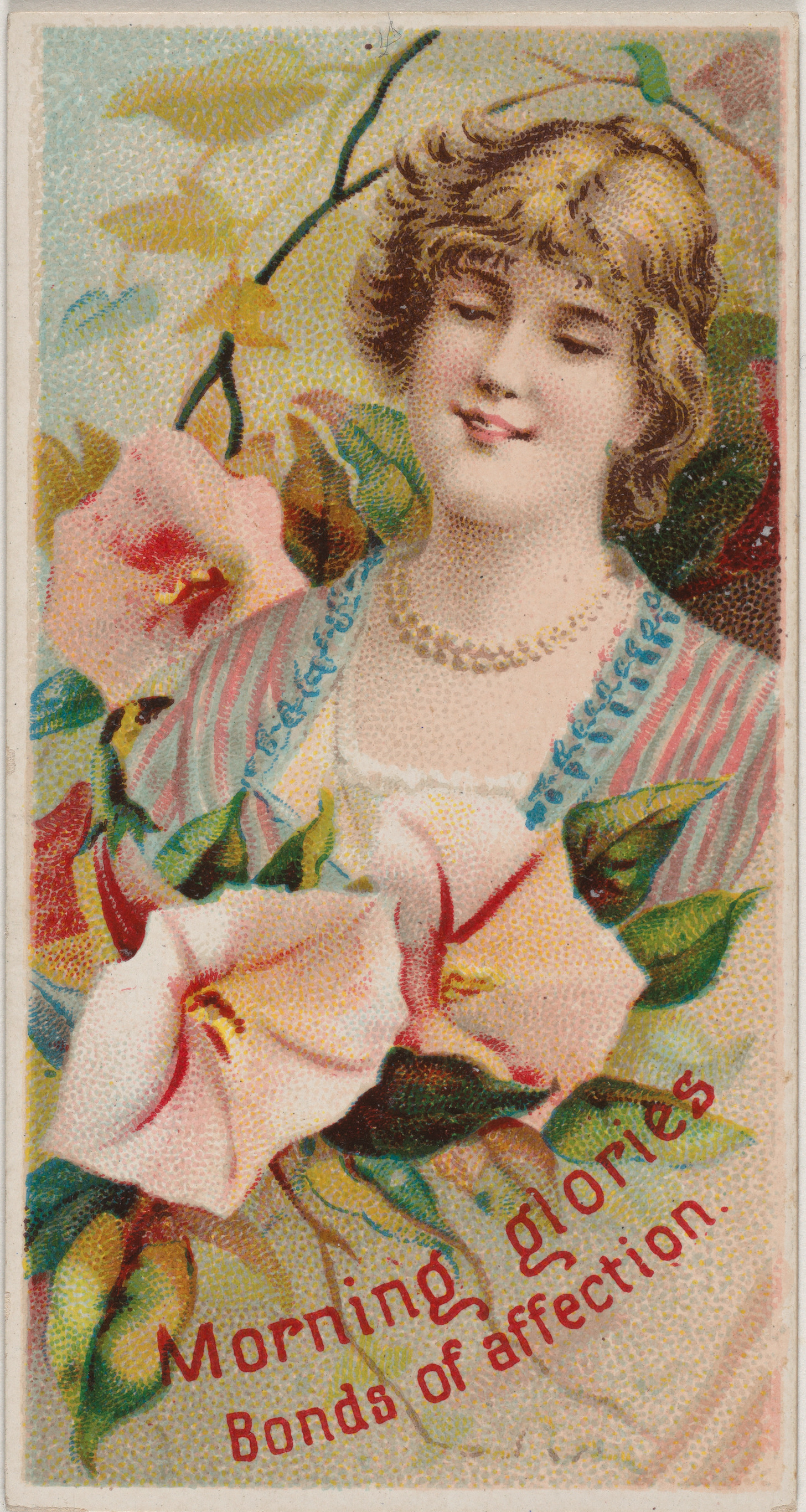
The morning glory flower is said to signify the bonds of affection in the language of flowers.

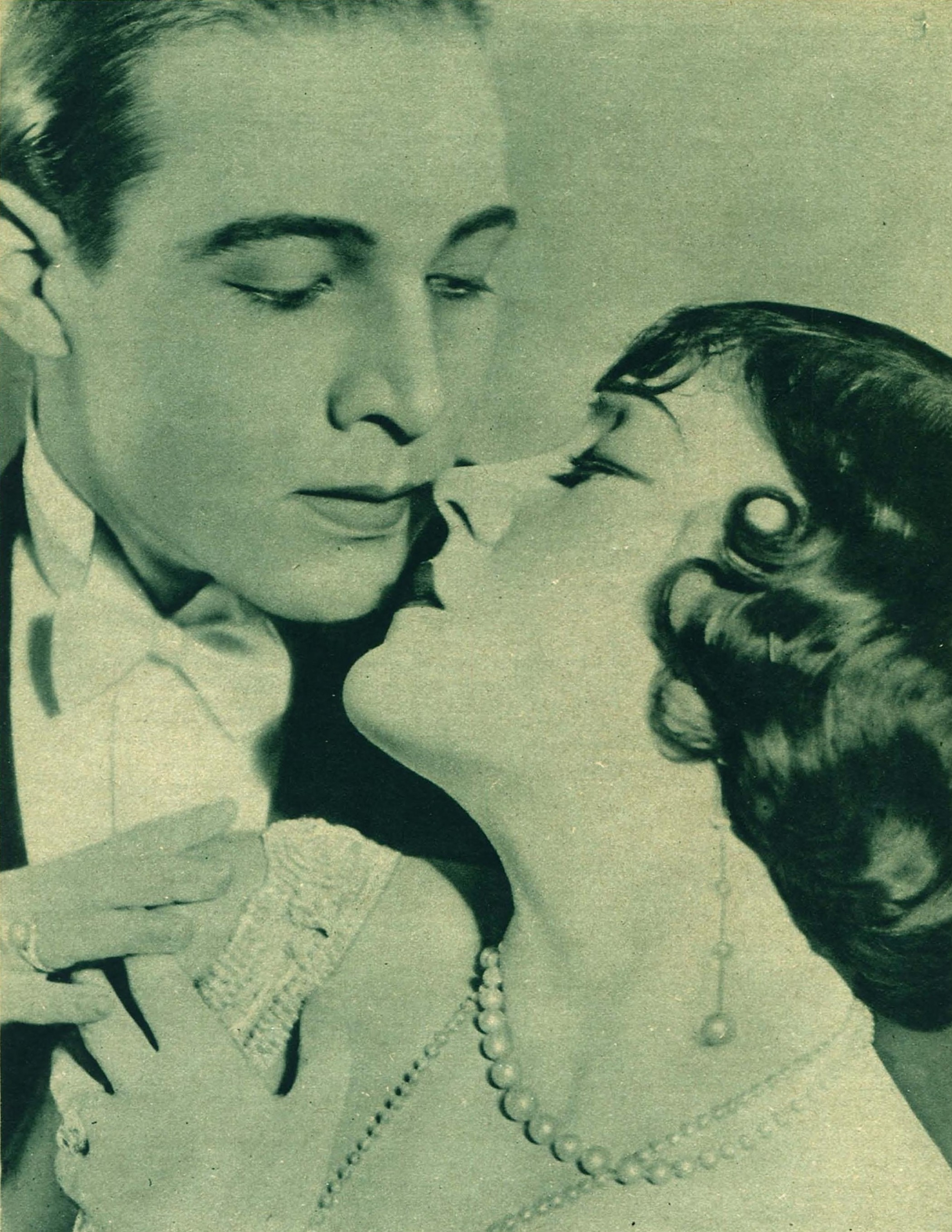
Gloria Swanson (1899–1983) and Rudolph Valentino (1895–1926) in the 1922 silent film drama Beyond the Rocks.

Gloria is the anglicized form of the Latin feminine given name gloriae (Latin pronunciation: ['gloːria]), meaning immortal glory; glory, fame, renown, praise, honor.

The name, as Maria de Gloria, was in regular use in Spain by 1700, one of a number of Titles of Mary in use for Portuguese and Spanish girls. Maria de Gloria was a name often given to girls born around Easter. the name was popularized in the Anglosphere by a character in the 1877 novel Gloria by Benito Pérez Galdós and published in England and the United States, and by the 1891 romantic novel Gloria by bestselling American author E. D. E. N. Southworth. The fame of American actress Gloria Swanson inspired greater usage of the name. The name reached the height of its popularity in the United States in 1926, when it was the 20th most popular name for girls. It was among the 40 most popular names for American girls until 1950. It has since declined in use but remains among the top 1,000 names for American girls.

Notable people with the name include:

== People ==
=== Academics and scientists ===
- Gloria Long Anderson (born 1938), American professor of chemistry
- Gloria Begué Cantón (1931–2016), Spanish professor, jurist, senator and magistrate
- Gloria Comesaña (1946–2024), Spanish philosopher
- Gloria Conyers Hewitt (born 1935), American mathematician
- Gloria Ladson-Billings (born 1947), American educator
- Gloria Montenegro, Chilean botanist and biologist
- Glòria Muñoz (born 1949), Spanish professor and painter
- Gloria Townsend, American computer scientist

=== Actors ===
- Gloria DeHaven (1925–2016), American actor and singer
- Gloria Diaz (born 1951), Filipina actor and winner of Miss Universe 1969
- Gloria Grahame (1923–1981), American actor and singer
- Gloria Hendry (born 1949), American actor
- Gloria Henry (1923–2021), American actor
- Gloria Jean (1926–2018), American actor and singer
- Gloria Joy (1910–1970), American actor
- Gloria Manon (1939–2018), American actor
- Glória Menezes (1934–2026), Brazilian actress
- Gloria Morel (1918–2005), Mexican actress
- Gloria Paul (born 1940), Anglo-Italian actor and dancer
- Gloria Reuben (born 1964), Canadian actor and singer
- Gloria Romero (actress) (born 1933), Filipino-American actor
- Gloria Saunders (1927–1980), American actor
- Gloria Stuart (1910–2010), American actor
- Gloria Swanson (1899–1983), American actor

=== Musicians ===
- Gloria Shayne Baker (1923–2008), American composer and songwriter
- Gloria Bash, Congolese singer-songwriter
- Gloria Coates (1938–2023), American composer
- Gloria Estefan (born 1957), Cuban-American singer-songwriter
- Gloria Gaynor (born 1943), American singer
- Gloria Groove (born 1995), Brazilian drag queen, singer, rapper, songwriter and actor
- Gloria Jessica (born 1994), Indonesian singer-songwriter
- Gloria Jones (born 1945), American singer-songwriter
- Gloria Lynne (1929–2013), American jazz singer
- Gloria Mann, American singer
- Gloria Trevi (born 1968), Mexican singer-songwriter

=== Politicians ===
- Gloria Macapagal Arroyo (born 1947), 14th President of the Philippines
- Gloria María Borrero (born 1956), Colombian justice minister
- Gloria De Piero (born 1972), former British Member of Parliament
- Gloria Leyba (born 1949), American politician
- Gloria McPhee (1926–2007), Bermudian politician
- Gloria Mendoza, American politician
- Gloria Amon Nikoi (1927–2010), Ghanaian foreign minister
- Gloria Ireen Ntopi, Malawian politician
- Gloria Reyes (born 1986), Dominican politician
- Gloria Romero (politician) (born 1955), American politician
- Gloria Vaughn (1936–2020), American politician

== Sports ==
- Gloria Emanuelle Widjaja, Indonesian badminton player
- Gloria Gauchia, Spanish table tennis player
- Gloria Hooper (athlete), Italian sprinter
- Gloria Marconi, Italian long-distance runner
- Gloria Pizzichini, Italian tennis player
- Gloria Kite (born 1998), Kenyan middle- and long-distance runner

== Writers ==
- Gloria Feldt, American writer
- Gloria D. Miklowitz, author of young adult literature
- Gloria Naylor, American novelist
- Gloria Cranmer Webster (1931–2023), Canadian activist and writer
- Gloria Zamacois (1897–1946), Spanish short story writer

== Other people ==
- Gloria, Princess of Thurn and Taxis (born 1960), German socialite, businesswoman, art collector and artist
- Gloria Allred, American attorney and women's rights activist
- Gloria Blackwell, African-American civil rights activist and educator
- Gloria Camiruaga (1941–2006), Chilean video artist
- Gloria de Herrera, American art restorer and collector
- Gloria Guinness, Mexican socialite and fashion icon
- Gloria Hunniford, British TV and radio presenter
- Gloria Meneses (1910–1996), Uruguayan performer and activist
- Gloria Notaro, Venezuelan ambassador
- Gloria Ramirez (1963–1994), woman who died from complications related to cancer and known as "The Toxic Lady".
- Gloria Ojulari Sule (1950–2024) British artist and educator
- Gloria Steinem, American feminist icon and writer
- Gloria Morgan Vanderbilt, American socialite
- Gloria Vanderbilt (1924–2019), American socialite

== Fictional characters ==
- Gloria Price, on the soap opera Coronation Street
- Gloria Pritchett, from Modern Family (2009–2020)
- Gloria Sato, from the animated series Big City Greens
- Gloria Stivic, on the 1970s sitcom All in the Family
- Gloria (Madagascar), a hippopotamus from DreamWorks' Madagascar franchise
- Gloria (The Simpsons), a recurring character in the animated sitcom The Simpsons
- Gloria (Happy Feet), a emperor penguin from Happy Feet franchise

== See also ==
- Gloria (disambiguation)
- Glória (disambiguation)
- Glory (disambiguation)
- La Gloria (disambiguation)
