= Gloria =

Gloria may refer to:

== Arts, entertainment, media ==
=== Music ===
==== Christian liturgy and music ====
- Gloria in excelsis Deo, the Greater Doxology, a hymn of praise
- Gloria Patri, the Lesser Doxology, a short hymn of praise
  - Gloria (Handel)
  - Gloria (Jenkins)
  - Gloria (Poulenc), a 1959 composition by Francis Poulenc
  - Gloria (Rutter)
  - Gloria (Vivaldi), a musical setting of the doxology by Antonio Vivaldi

==== Groups and labels ====
- Gloria (Brazilian band), a post-hardcore/metalcore band
- Gloria, later named Unit Gloria, a Dutch band with Robert Long as member

==== Albums ====
- Gloria (Disillusion album)
- Gloria!, an album by Gloria Estefan
- Gloria (Gloria Trevi album)
- Gloria (Okean Elzy album)
- Gloria (Sam Smith album)
- Gloria (Shadows of Knight album) (1966)
- Gloria (EP), an EP by Hawk Nelson

==== Songs ====
- "Gloria" (Enchantment song) (1976), a song later covered by Jesse Powell in 1996
- "Gloria" (Kendrick Lamar and SZA song), 2024
- "Gloria" (Leon René song), a song released by The Cadillacs in 1954
- "Gloria" (Mando Diao song), a 2009 song by Mando Diao from Give Me Fire
- "Gloria" (The Lumineers song) (2019)
- "Gloria" (Them song), a song written by Van Morrison in 1964 and covered by artists including the Shadows of Knight and Patti Smith
- "Gloria" (U2 song) (1981)
- "Gloria" (Umberto Tozzi song) (1979), a song later covered by Laura Branigan in 1982
- "Gloria" (Yui song)
- "Gloria", a 1997 song by Mineral from the album The Power of Failing
- "Gloria", a 2013 song by Relient K from the album Collapsible Lung
- "Gloria", a 2014 song by The Midnight
- "Gloria", a 2016 song by Magic! from Primary Colours
- "Gloria", a 2019 song by Jain

=== Films ===
- Gloria (1977 film), a French film directed by Claude Autant-Lara
- Gloria (1980 film) (1980), a film by John Cassavetes
  - Gloria (1999 American film), a remake by Sidney Lumet
- Gloria (1999 Portuguese film), a film by Manuela Viegas
- Gloria (2013 film), a Chilean film
- Gloria (2014 film), a Mexican film
- Gloria! (film), a 2024 Italian–Swiss film

=== Stage ===
- Gloria (ballet), a ballet by Kenneth MacMillan
- Gloria (opera), an opera by Francesco Cilea
- Gloria (play), a play by Branden Jacobs-Jenkins

=== Television ===
- Glória (2021 TV series), a Portuguese historical thriller series
- Gloria (2022 TV series), a French drama series starring Cécile Bois
- Gloria (American TV series), a 1982 American series, All in the Family spin-off
- Gloria (South Korean TV series), a 2011 South Korean MBC television series

=== Literature ===
- Gloria (magazine), a Croatian women's magazine
- Gloria (Finnish magazine), a Finnish women's magazine

== People and fictional characters ==
- Gloria (given name), including a list of people and fictional characters
- Gloria (Bulgarian singer), Bulgarian pop/folk singer
- Gloria (Irish singer), best known for her version of "One Day at a Time"

== Places ==
- Gloria, Lafayette Parish, Louisiana, an unincorporated community in the United States
- Gloria, Oriental Mindoro, a municipality in the Philippines

=== Facilities and structures ===
- Gloria Cultural Arena, a culture and music venue in Helsinki, Finland
- Gloria-Theater (Cologne), Germany
- Gloria 1, Christian High School, is a private Christian high school in Surabaya, Indonesia

== Groups, organizations ==
- Gloria Material Technology Corp., a steelmaking company in Taiwan
- Global Research in International Affairs Center, an institute of the Interdisciplinary Center in Israel

=== Sports ===
- Gloria (basketball team), from Moldova
- Gloria (cycling team), an Italian professional cycling team that existed between 1927 and 1942
- Gloria Bistriţa, a Romanian soccer club
- Gloria Buzău (disambiguation), several Romanian sports clubs
- Grêmio Esportivo Glória, Brazilian soccer club

== Ships ==
- ARC Gloria, a training ship of the Colombian Navy
- RV Gloria Michelle, a U.S. National Oceanic and Atmospheric Administration research vessel in service since 1980
- SS Gloria (1917), a German cargo ship in service during 1939

== Other uses ==
- Nissan Gloria, a Japanese automobile
- Gloria (heating system), a type of central heating system formerly used in Castile
- Hurricane Gloria (1985)
- Global Observation Research Initiative in Alpine Environments, an international mountain environment monitoring program
- GLORIA sidescan sonar, a sonar system

== See also ==
- Glória (disambiguation)
- Glory (disambiguation)
