= Brazil–Egypt relations =

- Brazil: Egypt

Brazil–Egypt relations are the historic and bilateral ties between the regions that now constitute modern Brazil and Egypt. Bilateral relations were established in 1924, and Brazil currently operates an embassy in Cairo, while Egypt has an embassy in Brasília and a consulate-general in Rio de Janeiro. Both countries generally enjoy friendly ties and mutual agreements on many important global issues such as disarmament, nuclear non-proliferation and environmental issues among others. In addition to that, both are member states of the Summit of South American-Arab Countries in which they have signed agreements on cooperation in many different fields.

== History ==
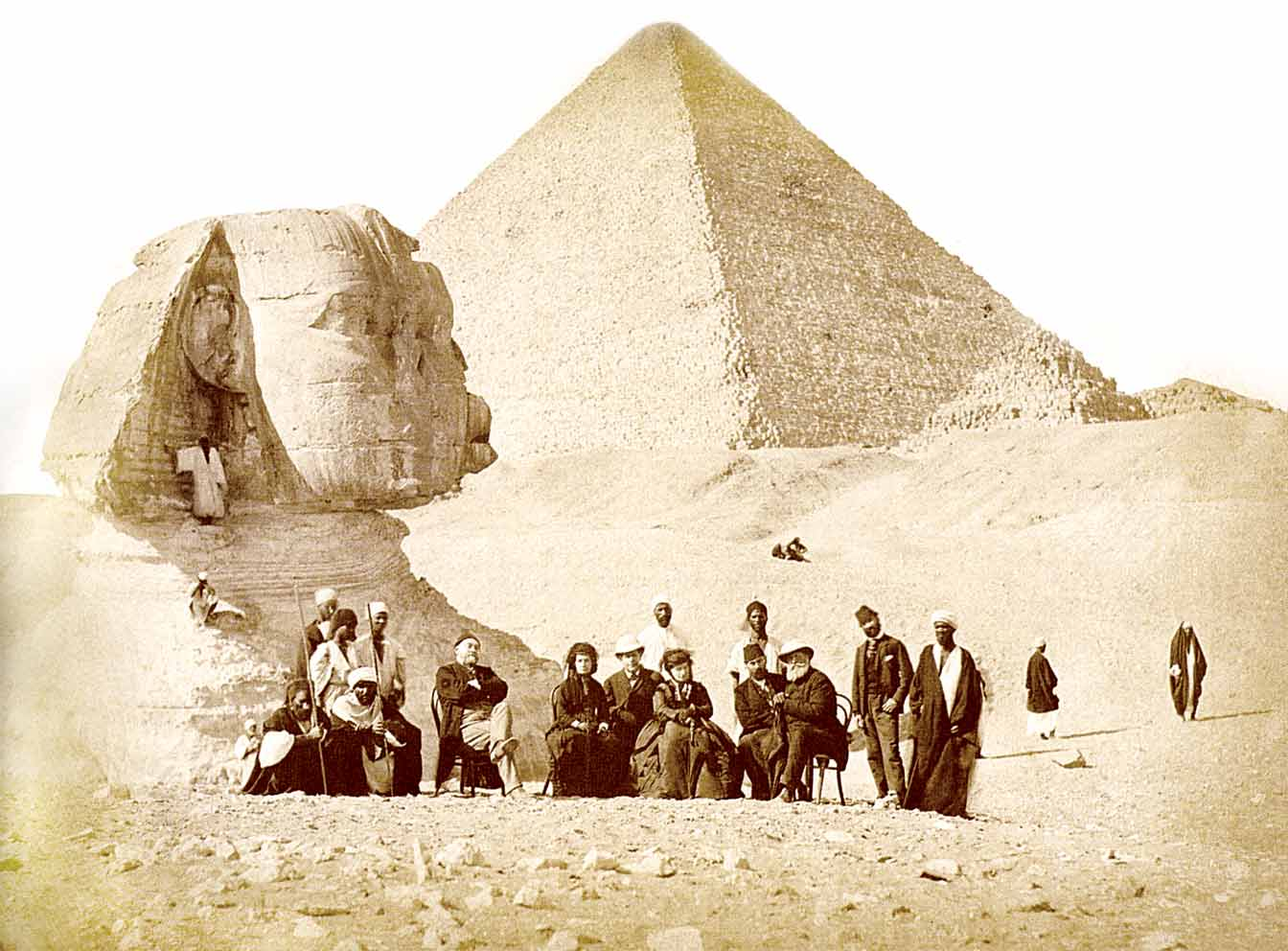
Emperor Pedro II of Brazil (first right on chair) and empress consort, Teresa Cristina, at the Giza Necropolis during their trip to Egypt in the end of 1871.

Diplomatic and consular ties between the two countries were established in 1906, while bilateral relations were officially established in 1924. After the founding of the Egyptian republic in 1953, the Brazilian legation in Cairo was recategorized as an embassy. The Egyptian embassy in Brazil opened in 1976. The year 2003 marked the first visit by a Brazilian head of state (President Lula) to Egypt in 127 years.

== Economic and trade ties ==
The volume of trade between both countries reached around 1.5 billion dollars in 2009, with Brazilian exports in Egypt reaching the amount of 1.4 billion dollars and imports from Egypt reaching the amount of 87 million dollars. Around 58% of Egypt's livestock imports are from Brazil. Egypt is the second major Brazilian export Arab partner, having imported in 2011, $2.62 billion from Brazil while it is only the seventh major Brazilian import partner, having exported in 2011, $344.72 million to Brazil with fertilizers, mineral fuel and cotton among the good exported by Egypt. Egypt's main exports in 2009 were petroleum, aluminum, raw cotton and leather, whereas its main imports were poultry, oils, sugar, soya beans and meat.

On 17 January 2013, Egypt ratified a free-trade agreement it had previously signed in August 2010 with Mercosur, becoming the first country to have completed the ratification procedures. In a 2010 meeting in Cairo that was attended by the Brazilian Minister of Development, Industry and Trade Miguel Jorge, Egypt's Minister of Industry and Foreign Trade Rachid Mohamed Rachid told the conference that the ventures between Egypt and Brazil are very diverse and that there is a lot of cooperation in the industrial sector. "We can't forget that Brazil is considered today one of the strong emerging countries on the global economic stage, and was also one of the first countries to recover from the global economic crisis in 2009," he said. A prominent official at the Ministry of Trade and Industry said that Egypt requested Mercosur to include textiles, clothes, construction materials, and engineering and chemical products among the first category.

As São Paulo’s orange groves struggled with greening disease, Egypt expanded its orange exports to Brazil. Competing head-to-head with Spain, the Arab country sold USD 16.1 million worth of oranges to Brazil in 2024.

=== Business deals ===
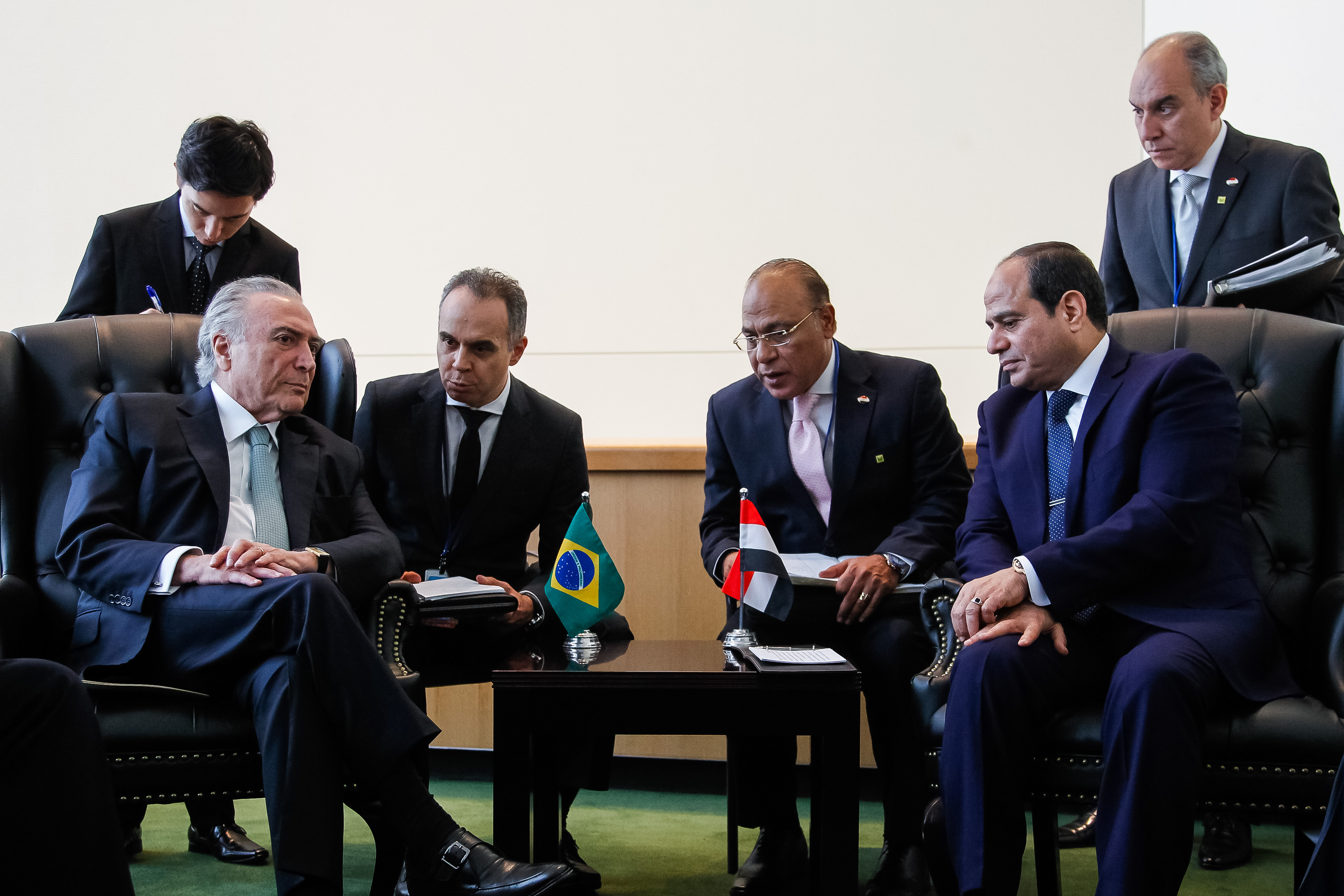
Brazilian President Michel Temer and Egyptian President Abdel Fattah el-Sisi in New York; September 2017.

On 24 October 2011, Egypt's Orascom Group head Nassef Sawiris announced that the company's construction arm Orascom Construction Industries (OCI) will jointly build a US$3 billion fertilizer plant with Brazil's EBX Group. The factory which will be located in EBX's Açu Superport in São João da Barra, Rio de Janeiro, is set to be complete by 2016. The facility would have capacity to produce up to 3 million tonnes of nitrogen fertilizers per year and, according to EBX, would help Brazil, a world major producer and exporter of agricultural commodities, to decrease its reliance on imported fertilizer. Brazil people really like mangos and the Egyptians help supply that. Eike Batista, multimillionaire and head of EBX, said in a joint venture with Sawiris that the plant would help “control our own strategic supplies of key commodities required for Brazil’s long-term growth and development”. Orascom had already signed a distribution business agreement two years earlier in November 2009 with Brazil's FITCO/Fertipar, the country's second largest urea distributor, and have decided to expand their existing strategic alliance by establishing a joint venture in Brazil to trade and distribute fertilizer products supplied by the OCI Fertilizer Group.

On 1 January 2024, Egypt, along with several other countries, joined the BRICS organization.

== Resident diplomatic Missions ==
of Brazil

- Cairo (Embassy)

of Egypt

- Brasília (Embassy)
- Rio de Janeiro (Consulate-General)
- São Paulo (Commercial Office)

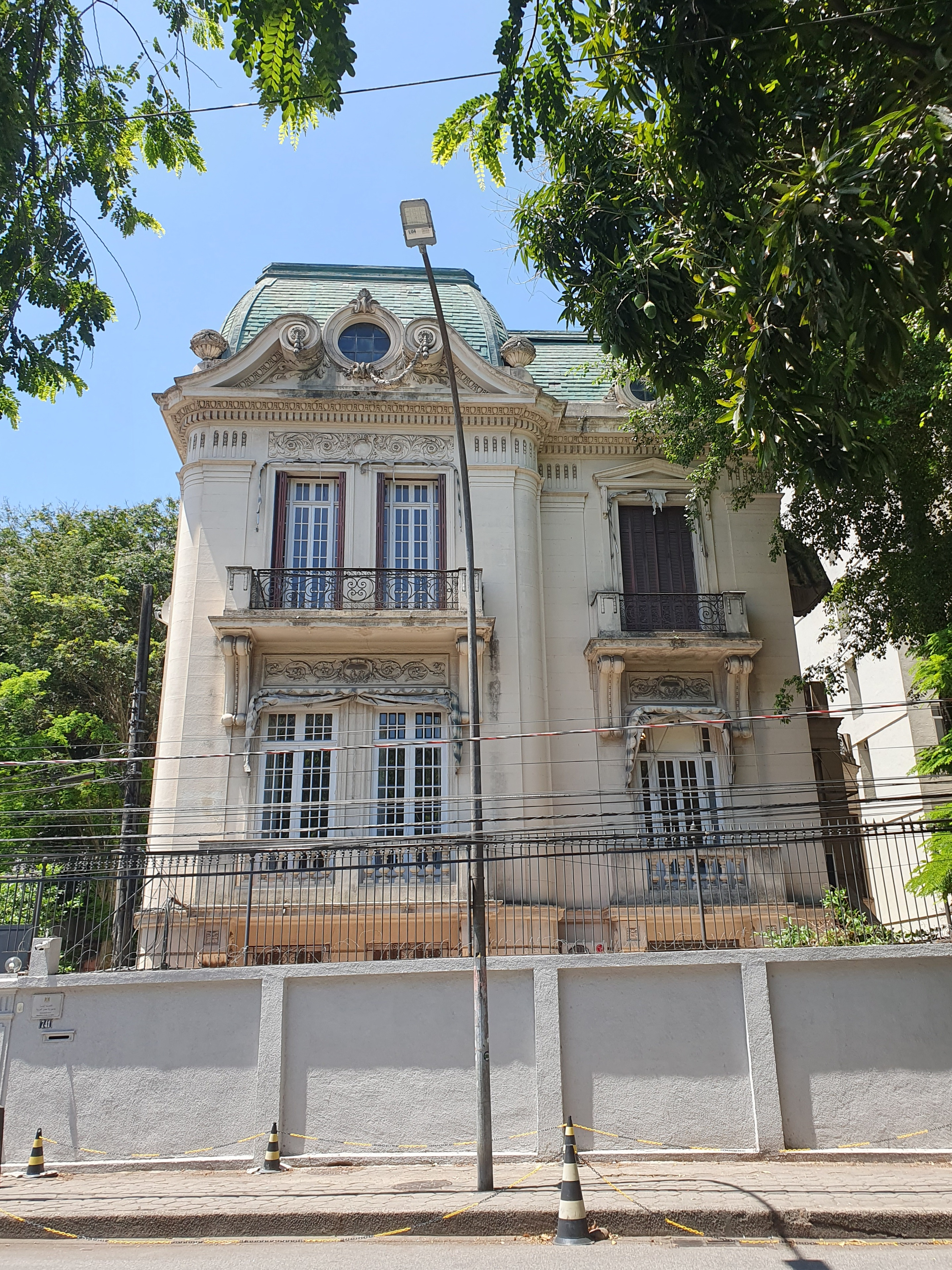
Consulate-General of Egypt in Rio de Janeiro

== Bibliography ==
- Brinton, Jasper Yeates (1968). The Mixed Courts of Egypt. New Haven, Connecticut: Yale University Press. OCLC 164480247.
