= Glória =

Glória may refer to:

== Places ==
- Glória (Rio de Janeiro), a neighborhood in Rio de Janeiro, Brazil
- Glória, Bahia, a municipality in Bahia, Brazil
- Glória, Porto Alegre, a neighbourhood in Porto Alegre, Brazil
- Glória d'Oeste, a town in Central-West Region of Brazil

=== Facilities and structures ===
- Ascensor da Glória, a funicular railway in Lisbon, Portugal
- Glória (Bratislava), a high-rise residential building in Bratislava, Slovakia
- Hotel Glória, grand hotel in the Glória neighbourhood of Rio de Janeiro

== People ==
=== People with the given name ===
Glória is a common Portuguese girl's name, the equivalent of Gloria in Spanish and English.

- Glória Pires (born 1963), Brazilian actress
- Glória Perez (born 1948), Brazilian telenovela writer
- Glória Menezes (born 1934), Brazilian actress

=== People with the surname ===
- Otto Glória (1917–1986), Brazilian football coach

== Other uses ==
- Grêmio Esportivo Glória, a Brazilian football club based in Vacaria, Rio Grande do Sul
- the Portuguese name of the 1999 film Gloria
- Glória (2021 TV series), a 2021 Portuguese television series streaming on Netflix

== See also ==
- Gloria (disambiguation)
