= The World's Billionaires 2010 =

Ranking of world billionaires by Forbes

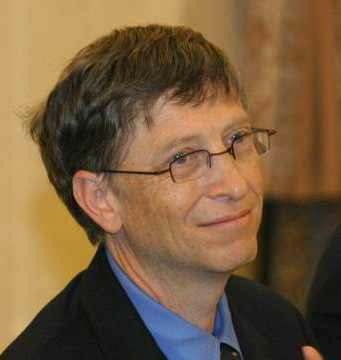
Bill Gates while travelling to Poland in 2006

The World's Billionaires 2010 edition was 24th annual ranking of The World's Billionaires by Forbes magazine. The list estimated the net worth of the world's richest people, excluding royalty and dictators, as of February 12, 2010. It was released online on March 10, 2010. Forty reporters across 13 countries contributed to the list. Carlos Slim and Bill Gates were featured on the cover.

== Annual list ==
Mexican telecommunication mogul Carlos Slim narrowly eclipsed Microsoft's Bill Gates to top the billionaire list for the first time. Slim saw his estimated worth surge $18.5 billion to $53.5 billion as shares of America Movil rose 35%. Gates' estimated wealth rose $13 billion to $53 billion, placing him second. Investor Warren Buffett was third with $47 billion, up from $37 billion. Christy Walton was the highest ranking women, placing 12th overall, with an inherited fortune of $22.5 billion. At age 25, Facebook founder Mark Zuckerberg was the world's youngest billionaire. American Isaac Perlmutter was among the top newcomers with an estimated fortunate $4 billion acquired in his sale of Marvel Entertainment to Disney.

A total of 1,011 people made the 2010, up from 793 the year before, but short of the all-time record of 1,125. The United States accounted for 403 billionaires, followed by China with 89 and Russia with 62. It was the first time China, which includes Hong Kong, placed second. A total of 55 countries were represented on the 2010 list, including Finland and Pakistan which claimed their first billionaires. China, India, South Korea, and Turkey were among 11 countries that saw a doubling of the numbers billionaires. Eighty-nine women made the list, but only 14 of them were self-made. Of the 89, 12 were newcomers in 2010. Half of those 14 self-made women came from China.

Steve Forbes said the growing number of billionaires was clear sign that the world's economy was recovering from the 2008 financial crisis. His magazine declared that Asia was leading the recovery, with the US lagging behind, based on the billionaire list. The 2010 list featured 164 re-entries and 97 true newcomers. Asia accounted for more than 100 of the new entrants. Overall, just 12% of the list lost wealth since 2009, and 30 people fell off the list. Thirteen others died. The combined net worth of the list was $3.6 trillion, up 50% from 2009's $2.4 trillion, while the average net worth was $3.5 billion. The United States accounted for 38% of the lists, down from 44% the year prior.

== Top 10 ==
Legend
Icon	Description
Steady	Has not changed from the previous year's list
▲	Has increased from the previous year's list
▼	Has decreased from the previous year's list

No.	Name	Net worth (USD)	Age	Citizenship	Source(s) of wealth
1 ▲	Carlos Slim & family	$53.5 billion ▲	70	Mexico	Telmex, América Móvil, Grupo Carso
2 ▼	Bill Gates	$53.0 billion ▲	61	United States	Microsoft
3 ▼	Warren Buffett	$47.0 billion ▲	79	United States	Berkshire Hathaway
4 ▲	Mukesh Ambani	$29.0 billion ▲	53	India	Reliance Industries
5 ▲	Lakshmi Mittal	$28.7 billion ▲	60	India	Arcelor Mittal
6 ▼	Larry Ellison	$28.0 billion ▲	66	United States	Oracle Corporation
7 ▲	Bernard Arnault	$27.5 billion ▲	61	France	LVMH Moët Hennessy • Louis Vuitton
8 ▲	Eike Batista	$27.0 billion ▲	53	Brazil	EBX Group
9 ▲	Amancio Ortega	$25.0 billion ▲	74	Spain	Inditex Group
10 ▼	Karl Albrecht	$23.5 billion ▲	90	Germany	Aldi Süd

== Top 100 ==
No.	Name	Net Worth USD billion	Age	Citizenship	Residence
1	Carlos Slim	53.5	70	Mexico	Mexico
2	William Gates III	53.0	54	United States	United States
3	Warren Buffett	47.0	79	United States	United States
4	Mukesh Ambani	29.0	52	India	India
5	Lakshmi Mittal	28.7	59	India	United Kingdom
6	Lawrence Ellison	28.0	65	United States	United States
7	Bernard Arnault	27.5	61	France	France
8	Eike Batista	27.0	53	Brazil	Brazil
9	Amancio Ortega	25.0	74	Spain	Spain
10	Karl Albrecht	23.5	90	Germany	Germany
11	Ingvar Kamprad & family	23.0	83	Sweden	Switzerland
12	Christy Walton & family	22.5	55	United States	United States
13	Stefan Persson	22.4	62	Sweden	Sweden
14	Li Ka-shing	21.0	81	Hong Kong	Hong Kong
15	Jim Walton	20.7	62	United States	United States
16	Alice Walton	20.6	60	United States	United States
17	Liliane Bettencourt	20.0	87	France	France
18	S. Robson Walton	19.8	66	United States	United States
19	Rami AbdulAziz Alghamdi	19.4	55	Saudi Arabia	Saudi Arabia
20	David Thomson & family	19.0	52	Canada	Canada
21	Michael Otto & family	18.7	66	Germany	Germany
22	Lee Shau Kee	18.5	82	Hong Kong	Hong Kong
23	Michael Bloomberg	18.0	68	United States	United States
24	Sergey Brin	17.5	36	United States	United States
24	Charles Koch	17.5	74	United States	United States
24	David Koch	17.5	69	United States	United States
24	Larry Page	17.5	37	United States	United States
28	Michele Ferrero & family	17.0	83	Italy	Monaco
28	Kwok family	17.0	n/a	Hong Kong	Hong Kong
28	Azim Premji	17.0	64	India	India
31	Theo Albrecht	16.7	88	Germany	Germany
32	Vladimir Lisin	15.8	53	Russia	Russia
33	Steven Ballmer	14.5	54	United States	United States
33	Robert Kuok	14.5	86	Malaysia	Hong Kong
35	George Soros	14.0	79	United States	United States
36	Anil Ambani	13.7	50	India	India
37	Paul Allen	13.5	57	United States	United States
37	Michael Dell	13.5	45	United States	United States
39	Mikhail Prokhorov	13.4	44	Russia	Russia
40	Birgit Rausing & family	13.0	86	Sweden	Switzerland
40	Shashi & Ravi Ruia	13.0	66	India	India
42	Mikhail Fridman	12.7	45	Russia	Russia
43	Jeffrey Bezos	12.3	46	United States	United States
44	Savitri Jindal	12.2	60	India	India
45	Donald Bren	12.0	77	United States	United States
45	Gerald Cavendish Grosvenor & family	12.0	58	United Kingdom	United Kingdom
45	John Paulson	12.0	54	United States	United States
48	Abigail Johnson	11.5	48	United States	United States
48	Jorge Paulo Lemann	11.5	70	Brazil	Brazil
50	Roman Abramovich	11.2	43	Russia	Russia
51	Susanne Klatten	11.1	47	Germany	Germany
52	Iris Fontbona & family	11.0	n/a	Chile	Chile
52	Forrest Mars Jr	11.0	78	United States	United States
52	Jacqueline Mars	11.0	70	United States	United States
52	John Mars	11.0	73	United States	United States
52	Ronald Perelman	11.0	67	United States	United States
57	Oleg Deripaska	10.7	42	Russia	Russia
58	Vagit Alekperov	10.6	59	Russia	Russia
59	Leonardo Del Vecchio	10.5	74	Italy	Italy
59	Carl Icahn	10.5	74	United States	United States
61	Vladimir Potanin	10.3	49	Russia	Russia
62	Philip Knight	10.2	72	United States	United States
63	Ricardo Salinas Pliego & family	10.1	54	Mexico	Mexico
64	Mohammed Al Amoudi	10.0	65	Saudi Arabia	Saudi Arabia
64	Ernesto Bertarelli & family	10.0	44	Switzerland	Switzerland
64	Anne Cox Chambers	10.0	90	United States	United States
64	George Kaiser	10.0	67	United States	United States
64	Hans Rausing	10.0	84	Sweden	United Kingdom
64	Joseph Safra	10.0	71	Brazil	Brazil
70	Alexei Mordashov	9.9	44	Russia	Russia
71	Viktor Rashnikov	9.8	61	Russia	Russia
72	German Larrea Mota Velasco & family	9.7	56	Mexico	Mexico
73	Sheldon Adelson	9.3	76	United States	United States
74	Silvio Berlusconi & family	9.0	73	Italy	Italy
74	Dan Duncan	9.0	77	United States	United States
74	Kushal Pal Singh	9.0	78	India	India
77	Nasser Al-Kharafi & family	8.7	66	Kuwait	Kuwait
77	Francois Pinault & family	8.7	73	France	France
79	Dmitry Rybolovlev	8.6	43	Russia	Russia
80	Iskander Makhmudov	8.5	46	Russia	Russia
80	James Simons	8.5	71	United States	United States
82	Alberto Bailleres & family	8.3	77	Mexico	Mexico
83	German Khan	8.2	48	Russia	Russia
84	Eliodoro, Bernardo & Patricia Matte	8.1	64	Chile	Chile
85	Edward Johnson III	8.0	79	United States	United States
86	Kumar Birla	7.9	42	India	India
87	Sunil Mittal	7.8	52	India	India
88	John Fredriksen	7.7	65	Cyprus	United Kingdom
89	Serge Dassault & family	7.6	84	France	France
89	Petr Kellner	7.6	45	Czech Republic	Czech Republic
89	Ananda Krishnan	7.6	71	Malaysia	Malaysia
89	Tadashi Yanai & family	7.6	61	Japan	Japan
93	Mohamed Bin Issa Al Jaber	7.5	51	Saudi Arabia	Saudi Arabia
93	Leonard Blavatnik	7.5	52	United States	United Kingdom
93	David & Simon Reuben	7.5	67	United Kingdom	United Kingdom
93	Nobutada Saji & family	7.5	64	Japan	Japan
93	Alain & Gerard Wertheimer	7.5	n/a	France	n/a
93	Vladimir Yevtushenkov	7.5	61	Russia	Russia
99	August von Finck	7.3	80	Germany	Switzerland
100	Lee Kun-Hee	7.2	68	South Korea	South Korea
100	Alisher Usmanov	7.2	56	Russia	Russia
100	Galen Weston & family	7.2	69	Canada	Canada

== See also ==
- List of wealthiest families
