= Gloria Muñoz =

Gloria Muñoz may refer to:

- Glòria Muñoz, Spanish painter and professor of painting
- Gloria Muñoz (actress), Spanish actress
