= Eneva =

Eneva S.A.
- Company type: Sociedade Anônima
- Traded as: B3: ENEV3
- Industry: Electricity
- Founded: 2001
- Headquarters: Rio de Janeiro, Brazil
- Products: Electric power
- Services: Electricity distribution
- Revenue: ▲US$ 820.8 million (2017)
- Net income: ▲US$ 44.0 million (2017)
- Website: www.eneva.com.br

Eneva (former name: MPX Energia S.A.) is a power generation company based in Rio de Janeiro, Brazil. It is listed at the São Paulo exchange.

== History ==
Eneva was founded in 2001 as MPX Energia. In January 2012, German energy utility E.ON agreed to buy a 10% stake in MPX for US$350 million. Eneva and E.ON also agreed to create an equally owned joint venture. Eneva will transfer its 11 power projects with licences for 11,000 MW of generating capacity into the joint venture. In March 2013, it was agreed that E.ON will increase its stake to 36.2%. In March 2020, Eneva extended a $1.5 billion merger proposal to Brazilian energy company AES Tiete.

== Power generation ==
Eneva is developing a thermal power plant in Ceará, Brazil, in partnership with MDU Resources Group, Inc. Together with EDP-Energias do Brasil MPX is building the 720 MW Pecem power plant. It is also building 360 MW Pecem II power plant and 360 MW Itaqui power plant, both coal-fired. MPX has also proposed the 720 MW coal-fired Sul power plant, 600 MW coal-fired Seival power plant and 2,100 MW coal-fired Acu power plant with a 3,300 MW natural gas-fired expansion.

In Chile, the company planned to build the 2,100 MW Castilla coal-fired power plant. The plan was approved by the Chile environmental authorities; however, the approval was annulled by the appeals court of Antofagasta.

In the field of renewable energy, the company has partnered with the Chinese solar power company Yingli for the development of Tauá solar plant, State of Ceará. The plant has installed capacity of 1 MW and MPX is planning to increase the capacity up to 50 MW.

== Coal mining ==
Eneva has coal mining rights in Colombia and a 70% stake in the Seival coal mine in southern Brazil. Through MPX Columbia it developed Canaverales coal mine in northern Colombia. The project includes Reeds, Papayal and San Benito open pit mines and the San Juan underground mine. The mining complex was expected to become operational by 2014. However financial pressures forced Eike Batista to sell the project to Yildirim Holding AS of Turkey for some $450 million. For coal export it developed a coal terminal at a 521 hectares (1,290 acres) site on the Atlantic coast in Dibulla, La Guajira. In addition to the terminal, a 150-kilometre (93 mi) railroad was to be built from the coal mine to the terminal. MPX had announced spinoff its coal mining assets in Colombia to form a new company called Colombian Coal (CCX), listed on the São Paulo stock exchange.

Together with OGX, Eneva has a 70% stake in seven natural gas exploration blocks in Maranhão.
