= Hotel Glória =

Building in Rio de Janeiro, Brazil

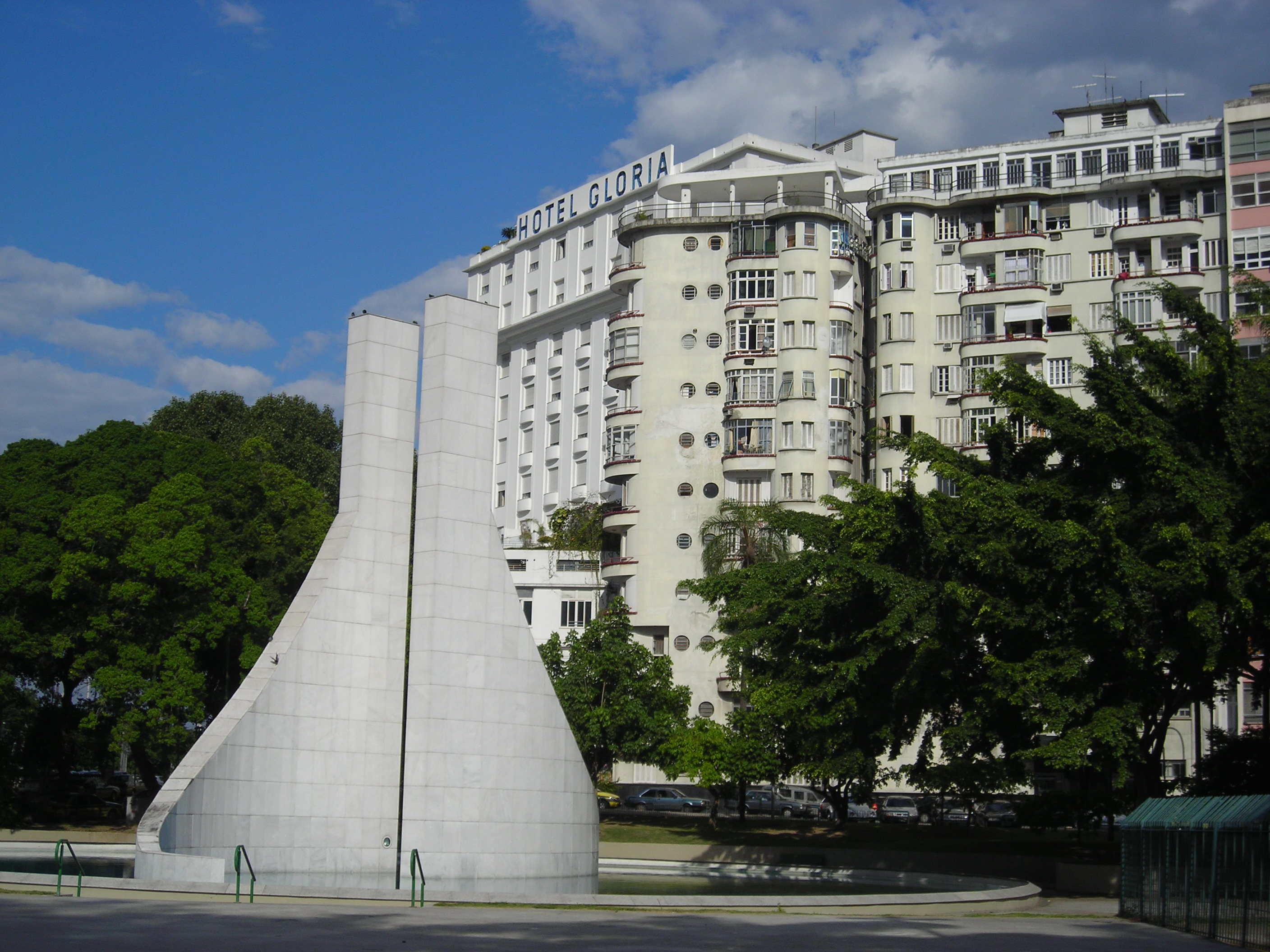

- Location within Rio de Janeiro

General information
- Location: Glória, Rio de Janeiro, Brazil
- Coordinates: 22°55′21″S 43°10′22″W
- Opening: 1922
- Closed: 2008

Other information
- Number of rooms: 630

The Hotel Glória is an abandoned historic hotel in the Glória neighbourhood of Rio de Janeiro, Brazil.

== History ==
The Hotel Glória was built by entrepreneur Rocha Miranda for the International Exhibition of 1922 to commemorate the centennial of Brazil's independence. It opened on August 15, 1922. The hotel was designed by Joseph Gire, who also designed the Copacabana Palace. It was reportedly the first reinforced concrete building to be built in South America and was erected with the aid of German engineers.

Originally the hotel had a casino (closed in 1946, when gambling was prohibited in Brazil), a theatre, ballrooms, recreation areas, and only about 280 rooms but was later expanded to about 630. Due to its proximity to the financial and political centre of the city of Rio de Janeiro, Hotel Glória always harbored great movie stars, singers, politicians, and heads of state.

Hotel Glória was built with 180 rooms. It was expanded by 100 rooms with a wing to the southwest, and a 400-room addition was added at an unknown date. The hotel has a reinforced concrete skeleton, and each room had a bathroom and a telephone. It was later furnished with a swimming pool, a steam sauna, an automatic phone billing system, a meeting room and equipment for video-conferences, and a heliport.

In 2008, the hotel was bought by Brazilian entrepreneur Eike Batista and closed for a complete restoration and refurbishment, which started in 2009. In 2013, however, Batista's EBX Group went bankrupt and the renovation was stopped, leaving the building incomplete and largely stripped. In 2014, Batista sold the hotel to Swiss investment fund Acron AG for 500 million Brazilian reais (approximately U.S.$ 210 million at the time), but the deal was undone in early 2016. Batista then sold the hotel to Mubadala Development Company, the Abu Dhabi sovereign wealth fund, for an undisclosed sum.

In 2022, it was announced that the derelict building would be restored as apartments.
