= MMX Mineração =

MMX Mineração e Metálicos S.A
- Type: Sociedade Anônima
- Traded as: B3: MMXM3
- Industry: Mining
- Founded: 2005
- Headquarters: Rio de Janeiro, Brazil
- Key people: Otavio De Garcia Lazcano, (CEO); Eike Batista, (former EBX Chairman)
- Products: Steel
- Revenue: ▲US$ 440.0 million (2013)
- Net income: ▼ - US$ 846.3 million (2013)
- Parent: EBX
- Website: www.mmx.com.br

MMX is the mining company of the EBX Group founded in 2005. It is engaged in the extraction, beneficiation and sale of iron ore and minerals in Brazil and Chile. The company filed for bankruptcy in 2016, and it is part of the current investigation of fraud and money laundering linked to its owner Eike Batista. Following a period in judicial reorganization, the bankruptcy decree against MMX Mineração e Metálicos and its subsidiary MMX Corumbá Mineração was upheld by Rio de Janeiro's Court of Appeals in May 2021, ending its judicial reorganization efforts and its trading on B3.

MMX declared having the capacity to produce 10.8 million tonnes per year (mtpy) of iron ore in 2013. The company planned to invest in the expansion of the total installed capacity to reach an output up to 40 mtpy of iron ore. The company operates through of two systems in Brazil, it's the Sistema Sudeste (Southeast System) e Sistema Corumbá (Corumbá System) and in Chile.

The Sistema Sudeste is made up of units Serra Azul and Good Success. In the region of Serra Azul - Iron Quadrangle in Minas Gerais - MMX operates the mines, Tico Tico and Ipê acquired, respectively, in late 2007 and early 2008.

The Serra Azul Unit has installed capacity to annually produce 8.7 million tons of iron ore. In December 2010, MMX announced investments of $3.5 billion to expand capacity to 24 million tons per year.

In February 2011, MMX has acquired the right to explore for 30 years the Pau de Vinho Mine which is owned by Usiminas. The mine is located in an area adjacent to Blue Mountain Drive, which optimizes its operation. Early studies show that Pau de Vinho Mine can add more than 8 million tons of iron ore per year to the production of MMX in the region.

The iron ore produced at Serra Azul is sold to customers in Brazil and abroad. Currently, the flow of production to the foreign market is done by rail to the port of the CSN, located in Itaguaí. From 2013 to use the MMX's Superporto Sudeste newer assets of the company to export iron ore. In Bom Sucesso, Midwest region of Minas Gerais, MMX has the Bom Sucesso Unit, which is in the process of environmental licensing.

The MMX has also the Sistema Corumbá, in Mato Grosso do Sul, in operation since 2005, whose annual production capacity is 2.1 million tons. Part of the production of Corumbá is drained by the Paraguay River to the Port of Campana, Argentina, where iron ore is shipped to foreign customers, especially Argentina and European countries. The other part is transported by truck to domestic steel mills.

In Chile, MMX operated through its subsidiary Minera MMX de Chile, which holds mining rights for the extraction of iron in the region of the Atacama Desert. The project was undertaking geological surveys. MMX expected to be producing 10 million tons of iron ore per year by 2016. The Chilean subsidiary was sold to Inversiones Cooper Mining in 2013.

== Superporto Sudeste ==
The Superporto Sudeste is a mega private port terminal mixed-use, dedicated to the movement of iron ore, which is being built on the island of Madeira, in the municipality of Itaguaí, in Rio de Janeiro state. Strategically located, the Southeast Superport represents the shortest distance between the Iron Quadrangle in Minas Gerais and the sea. The construction of the project was initiated in July 2010 and is expected to begin operation in 2014.

With the start of operations in Southeast Superport, MMX entire production is exported. The transportation of iron ore from mine to port, is guaranteed by the MRS, the railroad that connects the Iron Quadrangle in Minas Gerais to Itaguaí, in Rio de Janeiro, where the MMX builds Superporto Sudeste. Mubadala Trafigura took over the control of the company owning the port (Porto Sudeste do brasil SA) in October 2013 by buying 65% of it, to reduce debt of the company.
