= Gloria Cultural Arena =

Culture and music venue in Helsinki, Finland

Coordinates: 60°9′50.62″N 24°56′43.06″E

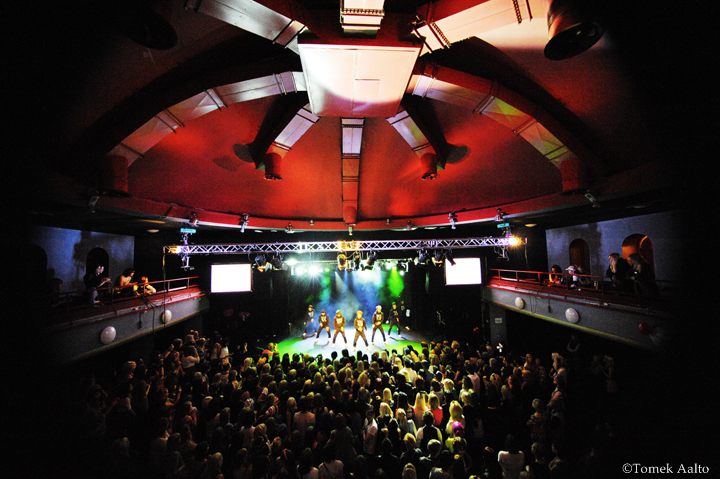
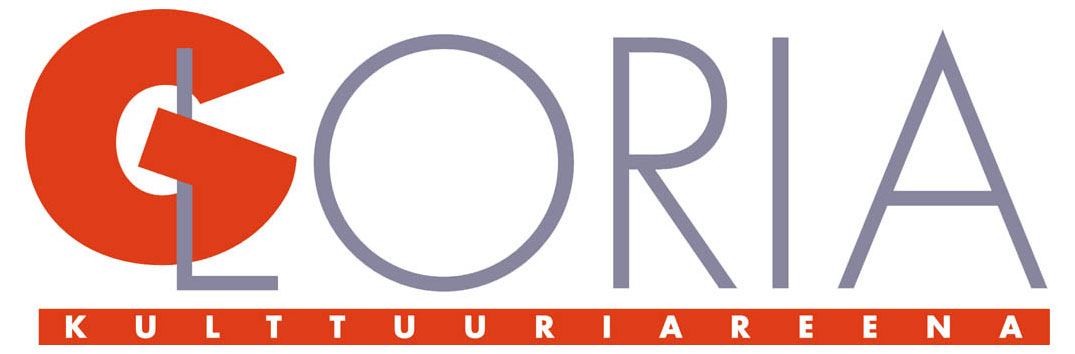
- Established: January 18th, 1999
- Location: Pieni Roobertinkatu 12-14, Helsinki, Finland
- Visitors: over 700,000 in 15 years
- Director: Pekka Mönttinen
- Website: www.nk.hel.fi/gloria

Gloria is a cultural arena which has been operating regularly since 1999 and is located in Helsinki, Finland at Pieni Roobertinkatu 12–14. The events that have been organized have mostly been focused on music events; however, there have been other events as well such as theater, dance, film, art exhibitions, and outdoor events. There have been over 50,000 performers, over 3000 events, and well over 700,000 visitors.

== Production ==
Gloria is a cultural arena of Helsinki city's youth center. Gloria's production ranges from opera to rock, performance to art exhibitions, and theater to installations.

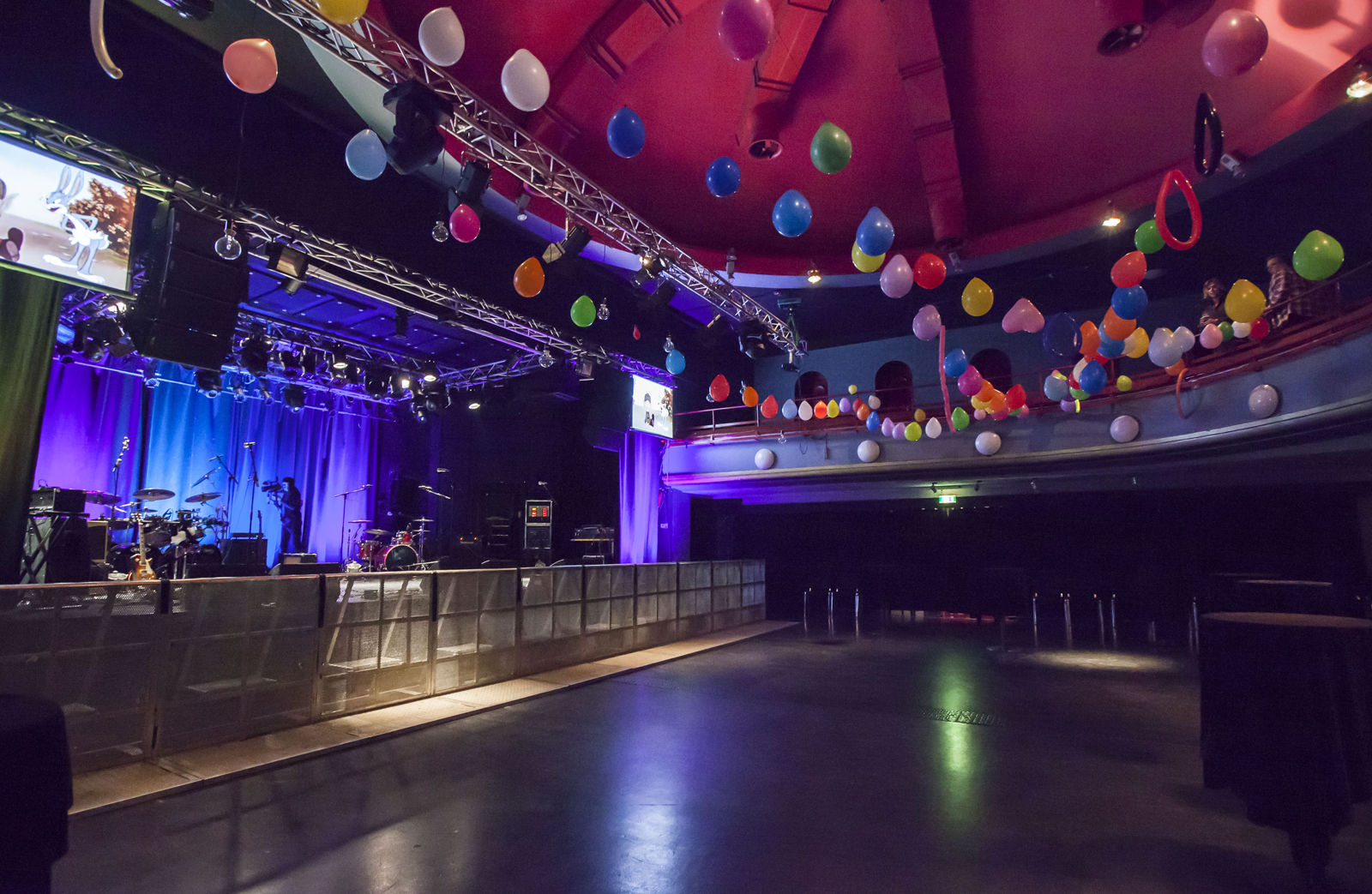
Gloria's interior

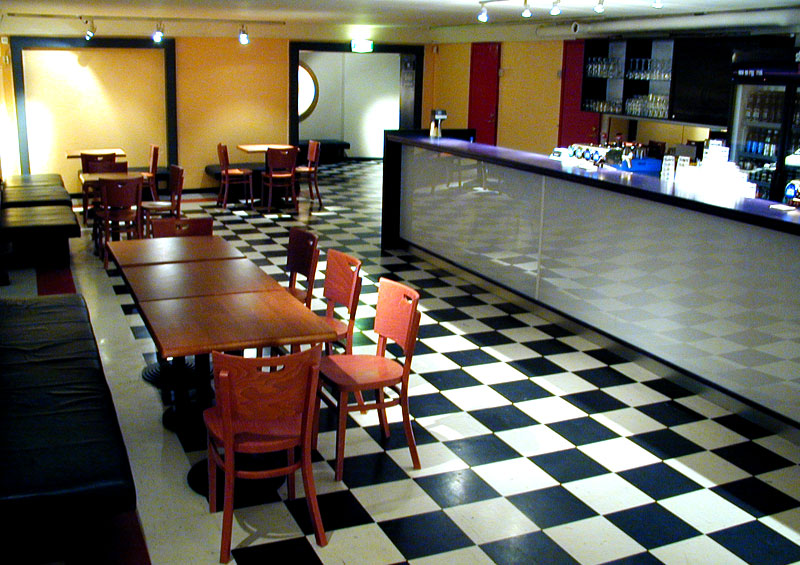
Restaurant space

== Premises ==
In addition to the stage and transformable spaces, there are light and audio equipment, as well as three bar counters. The main stage is 65m² and the audience capacity is 600 persons in the hall. Depending on the arrangements, altogether 300-400 seats fit on both floors. Gloria has two entrances: the main entrance at Pieni Roobertinkatu meant for the audience and at Yrjönkatu which leads directly to the dressing rooms.

== Events in 2013 ==
Gloria organizes numerous events yearly; in 2013, over 200 events were organized in Gloria which included:

- Trash Fest VI
- Musicians Against Racism
- Annyeong! Party XI
- Negative, Hellpunks, The Liar
- Helsinki Lolita Convention
