= Gloria Camiruaga =

Chilean artist

Gloria Camiruaga (5 October 1940 – 10 April 2006) was a Chilean videographer born in Santiago, whose art later became documentary in style. She was one of the first female videographers in Chile. Her work focused on the depiction of political corruption and social issues in Chile from the perspective of women. Her work was political, focusing on the political unrest in Chile such as the coup d'état of the 1970s. She has worked on numerous solo projects and with other artists in collaboration.

== Early life ==
Camiruaga was born in Santiago, Chile in 1940. In 1971 she received a degree in philosophy from the University of Chile. After she moved to San Francisco and began her studies at the San Francisco Art Institute, graduating in 1980. Camiruaga focused on video art while in San Francisco, and continued making experimental films once she returned to Chile in the early 1980s.

Camiruaga returned to Chile sometime in the early 1980s. During this time, Augusto Pinochet's violent rule dominated the country, threatening extreme punishment as the cost of dissent.

== Art works ==
- Mujeres de campamento, 1982. 7:00 min Video.
- Tricolor, 1983. 11:00 min Video.
- Popsicles, 1984. 6:00 min Video.
- Clotario Blest, maestro de paz, 1983. 20:00 min Video.
- Mantanerse Juntos, 1985. 3:20 min Video.
- Diamela Eltit, 1986. 8:00 min Video.
- ERI pan nuestro de cada día, 1987. 7:00 min Video.
- Performance San Martín-San Pablo, 1988. 12:00 min Video.
- Del hecho al derecho hay mucho trecho, 1988. 25:00 min Video.
- Todo el mundo sabe, 1988. 12:00 min Video.
- Casa Particular, 1989-1990 9:00 min Video
- Parada, 1990. 7:00 min Video
- Yeguas del Apocalipsis en performance, 1990. 7:00 min Video.
- Por fin mis huellas, 1991. 14:00 min Video.
- Nicanor Parra 91, 1991. 40:00 min Video.
- Mi primer amor, mi primer horror, 1992. 5:00 min Video.
- Las Minas de las Minas, 1993. 42:00 min Video.
- Una vez nada más, 1994. 42:00 min Video.
- La Venda, 1999–2000. Video.
- Clotario Blest, Nuestro Quijote, 2005. 16:00 min Video.
- Un día después, 2005–2006. 10:00 min Video.

=== Tricolor ===
Camiruaga's Tricolor focuses on three colors: red, blue and white an American patriotism that reflects the overall American whiteness in the art community. The white screens represent the lack of female artists.

=== Popsicles ===
Young girls and women are seen licking melting popsicles that reveal small toy soldiers, the women recite Hail Marys repeatedly. The video shows the innocence and exploitation of the young women at the hands of the violence, specifically from the war and military presence in Chile which is represented by the toy soldiers.

=== Casa Particular ===
In English, the title translates to Particular Home. A documentary that shows Camiruaga interviewing a group of transvestite sex workers in a brothel. They recount their stories and Camiruaga's platform shows them in a new light as they dance and enjoy each other's company. They talk about hiding their work and the brutality they experience, such as fearing for their safety as they are targets of hate crimes.

=== La Venda ===
A video of ten women giving testimonies of the rape and beating they received during the dictatorship of Augusto Pinochet the title "La Venda" translated to blindfold as the women say they were blindfolded as they endured pain. Camiruguaga used testimonies because women's stories went underrepresented. Giving the women a face and name to their stories was legitimizing the suffering they endured and making Chile aware of the sexist abuse.

== Exhibitions ==
- Museum of Modern Art, Media Lounge in New York from February 29, 2012- July 8, 2012.
- Hammer Museum, University of California, Los Angeles. Radical Women in Latin American Art, 1960–1985.
- In 2018, her work was included in the Brooklyn Museum's exhibition Radical Women: Latin American Art, 1960-1985.

== Collections ==
Her work is included in the collections of the National Gallery of Canada, the Musée d'art contemporain de Montréal, Stedelijk Museum Amsterdam and the Museum of Modern Art, New York.
