= Gloria Leyba =

American politician

Member of the Colorado House of Representatives from the 2nd district
- In office 1995 – January 10, 2001
- Preceded by: Doug Linkhart
- Succeeded by: Desiree Sanchez

Personal details
- Born: November 2, 1949 (age 76) Dragerton, Utah
- Party: Democratic

Gloria Leyba (born November 2, 1949) is an American politician who served in the Colorado House of Representatives from the 2nd district from 1995 to 2001.
