= Glória, Porto Alegre =

Neighbourhood in Porto Alegre, Brazil

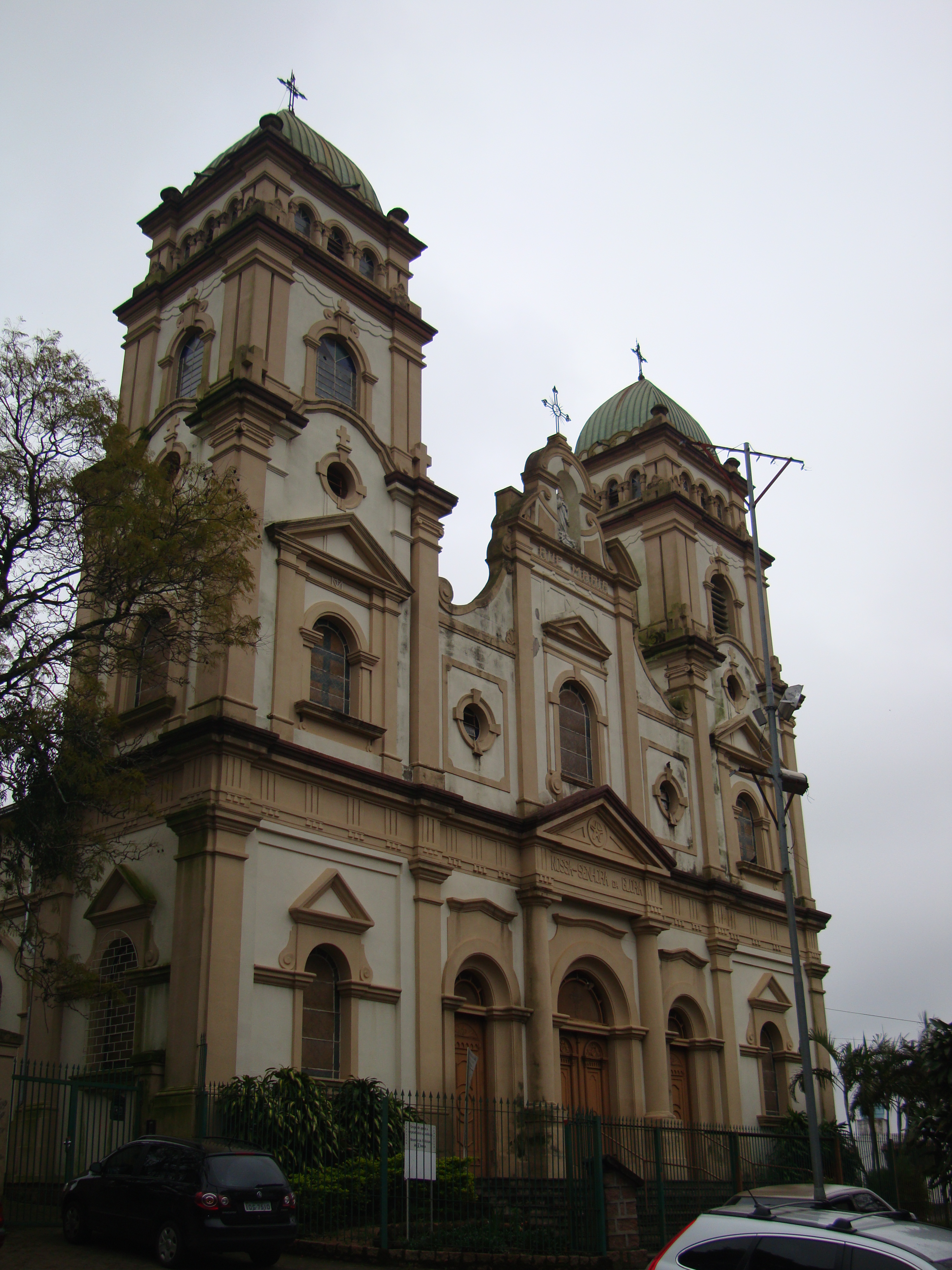
Our Lady of Glory Church.

Glória (meaning Glory in English) is a neighbourhood in the city of Porto Alegre, the state capital of Rio Grande do Sul, in Brazil. It was created by Law 2022 from December 7, 1959, but had its limits modified by Law 2681 from December 21, 1963.

The arraial (village) of Glória was created in the 19th century, when the Silveira Nunes family donated to the prefecture a big property, in which two parallel roads were constructed - today Carlos Barbosa and Oscar Pereira avenues.

The neighbourhood name comes from a lady called Maria da Glória, married to a colonel whose big house was a landmark in the region.

In 1915, the Igreja de Nossa Senhora da Glória was built.

Glória is home to two private schools of Porto Alegre, the Marista Assunção and Nossa Senhora da Glória schools.

== Notable residents ==
- Teixeirinha, singer
