= Gloria Ireen Ntopi =

Malawian politician

Member of Parliament for Nsanje South

Personal details
- Party: Democratic Progressive Party
- Occupation: Politician

Gloria Ireen Ntopi is a Malawian politician known for her involvement in parliamentary politics in Malawi. She is a member of the Democratic Progressive Party (DPP) and has contested elections for the Nsanje South Constituency in Nsanje District. Ntopi is well known because of her participation in parliamentary elections and political mobilisation activities in Malawi.

== Political career ==
Ntopi joined the Malawian politics as a candidate for the Nsanje South parliamentary seat. During the 2009 Malawian parliamentary elections, she contested under the Democratic Progressive Party (DPP) and received 4,874 votes according to available electoral records. Ntopi has also appeared among parliamentary aspirants contesting as an independent candidate.

== Electoral campaigns ==
During election periods, Ntopi was involved in campaign activities within Nsanje South Constituency, addressing issues affecting the local population and encouraging civic participation in democratic processes. Her campaigns was focused on community engagement and dialogue with voters, especially in rural areas of Nsanje District where political mobilisation determines electoral outcomes.

== Advocacy and public engagement ==
Ntopi has been involved in civic engagement programmes that helps to improve political participation, especially among women. In 2019 she was among female parliamentary aspirants who participated in outreach initiatives focused on encouraging women to participate in politics.

During these engagements, she talked about the importance of empowering women to participate actively in governance and leadership.

She talked publicly on the importance of maintaining peaceful elections and promoting dialogue among political stakeholders.

== See also ==
- Politics of Malawi
- Nsanje District
- Democratic Progressive Party
