= EBX Group =

Brazilian conglomerate

EBX
- Type: Conglomerate
- Industry: Infrastructure, Energy, Mining, Shipping
- Founded: 1984
- Headquarters: Rio de Janeiro, Brazil
- Key people: Eike Batista (former CEO)
- Subsidiaries: OGX, MMX, OSX Brasil, CCX, REX, IMX, SIX, AUX, NRX Newrest
- Website: EBX Group

EBX Group was a conglomerate that comprises six companies listed in B3's Novo Mercado, including Dommo Energia, MMX, OSX, and CCX. It was founded by Brazilian businessman Eike Batista, who served as chairman of the conglomerate before his arrest in 2017. The group primarily invested in infrastructure and natural resources, also having initiatives in real estate, technology, entertainment, sports, gold mining, air, and railway catering. The EBX Group was active in nine Brazilian states, Chile, Canada, Colombia, and New York City.

== History ==
The EBX Group activities started in the early 1980s with Eike Batista's Novo Planeta project, the first mechanized alluvial gold mine in the Amazon. Over the course of that decade, Batista became chairman of the board and CEO of TVX Gold. It was starting with this company — listed in Canada's Toronto Stock Exchange – that Batista's relationship with the global capital markets began.

Between 1980 and 2000, EBX earned US$20 billion in value through the implementation and operation of nine gold and silver mines in Brazil and Canada (Amapari, Casa Berardi, Crixás, Musselwhite, New Britania, Novo Astro, Novo Planeta, and Paracatu), as well as a mine in Chile (La Coipa, now owned by Kinross Gold). In the 2000s, he began operating three iron ore mines in Brazil (Mina 63, Tico Tico, and Ipê)

Between 2011 and 2012, EBX Group invested US$15.7 billion and partnered with General Electric, following a partnership that claimed to generate 20,000 jobs in the construction and operation of its enterprises.

== Natural resources and infrastructure ==
The EBX Group's activities focused primarily on infrastructure and natural resources. MMX Mineração is one of the EBX Group's subsidiaries, a company operated through two systems and located in Corumbá, Mato Grosso do Sul.

In 2011, MPX—a mining company founded in 2005, belonging to the EBX Group—began operating the first commercial-scale solar power plant in Brazil in Tauá, Ceará. In 2012, two of the company's thermoelectric power plants came into operation–Energia Pecém in Ceará and Itaqui in Maranhão. In 2013, the company intended to begin operations of its Pecém II plant in Ceará and the first phase of operations of its thermoelectric power plant, UTE Parnaíba in Maranhão.

LLX, the group's logistics company, coordinated the construction of the Southeast Superport in São João da Barra, Rio de Janeiro, as a part of the company's plan to quadruple its production capacity in the coming years.. It was the home of Açu Shipbuilding Unit (UCN Açu), in which OSX, EBX Group's offshore company, invested US$1.7 billion. OSX's focus was in the sectors of shipbuilding, exploration and production (E&P) unit chartering, and operations and maintenance (O&M) services.

In the oil and gas sector, OGX is responsible for the largest private sector exploratory campaign in Brazil. Founded in 2007, the company was one of the country's leading oil producers. In January 2012, OGX began extracting oil from the Waimea accumulation in Rio de Janeiro's Campos Basin. OGX has a portfolio of 30 exploration blocks in Brazil in the Campos, Santos, Espírito Santo, Pará-Maranhão, and Parnaíba Basins, as well as four exploration blocks in Colombia, located in the Cesar-Ranchería Basin and Lower Magdalena Valley.

CCX, the Colombian edition of MPX's coal mining assets, is developing an integrated greenfield coal mining project in Latin America. This project includes an underground mine (San Juan), two open pit mines (Cañaverales and Papayal), and a dedicated integrated logistics system, which consists of a 150 km (93 mile) railway and a deepwater port capable of accommodating capesize-type vessels.

Colombia is also where the EPX Group's investments in gold mining are concentrated. In March 2011, the group acquired, through AUX, stock control of the Canadian mining firm Ventana Gold, which owns mineral rights in northern Colombia's historical California-Vetas gold mining region.

== Other activities ==
REX is EBX Group's real estate company. Founded in 2008 to identify real estate opportunities, the company began operations in 2011 with a business focus on urban development and income-generating assets. Among other initiatives, the company's business portfolio includes restoration of Hotel Glória, which is now called Glória Palace Hotel; MD.X Medical Center, a center for integrated medicine; R3X Leblon Business Center; and Hotel Parque do Flamengo, all in the city of Rio de Janeiro.

EBX Group also exploits technology through SIX Intelligent Solutions. Created in October 2011, SIX arose from the acquisition of stock control over AC Engenharia, a company with 18 years’ experience in the Brazilian market, having as its focus the oil and gas operations sector. In April 2012, EBX Group and IBM announced a strategic partnership. The agreement includes IBM's acquisition of 20% of SIX Automation, a subsidiary of SIX Intelligent Solutions, and the creation of a center for the joint development of technology solutions and R&D (research and development) focused primarily on the natural resources and infrastructure sectors, as well as outsourcing EBX Group's IT operations to IBM.

IMX, a joint venture with the American firm IMG Worldwide, is EBX Group's sports and entertainment company, devoted to the staging of events and production of entertainment content in the sports, fashion, and music sectors. Also in 2011, EBX Group created NRX-Newrest, to operate in Brazil's air and rail catering sectors. The result of the joint venture with Newrest (the only major global company that operates in all segments of catering and related services) is that NRX-Newrest will provide food services, as well as onshore and offshore operational support, cleaning and hospitality, and other services. EBX Group is also developing initiatives in the areas of sports, entertainment, hospitality, cuisine, health, and the environment in the city of Rio de Janeiro, where EBX is headquartered.

== Synergies ==
MMX iron ore will be transported to the Southeast Brazil Superport, where it will be exported. Steel plates produced by steel mills installed in LLX's Açu Superport Industrial Complex will be used by OSX in the production of offshore equipment, which will be chartered by OGX for its production of oil and gas. Coal from CCX's Colombian mines will be transported to MPX's thermoelectric power plants located along the Brazilian coast and to LLX's superport, and the energy generated will be supplied to the industries located in the industrial complex. The natural gas produced by OGX can supply MPX's thermoelectric power plants located in LLX's superport industrial complex. LLX's superport could serve as the onshore base for OGX's production of oil and gas. MPX will provide power to MMX's main operating unit in Minas Gerais.

== Socio-environmental activities in Brazil ==
EBX and its companies support more than 170 social and environmental initiatives in Brazil, among which are the preservation of three national parks (Maranhenses, Fernando de Noronha and Pantanal). Additionally, it has created and maintains three of its own reserves – the Private Natural Heritage Reserves (RPPNs) Engenheiro Eliezer Batista (tropical wetland), Quebrada del Morel (Atacama Desert), and Caruara (salt marsh). It also supports the management of four RPPNs in Brazil's Pantanal (Dorochê, Acurizal, Penha, and Rumo ao Oeste), and the creation of another ten in Ceará. EBX Group also supports Muriqui ecological corridor, one of the largest restoration projects ever developed in the Atlantic Forest in Brazil, and the preservation of Colombia's Cañaverales Fountainhead.

In the social arena, family relocation programs (Vila Nova Canaã in Maranhão and Vila da Terra in São João da Barra, in Rio de Janeiro State); construction of the Pediatric Cancer Center (CPC) in Ceará; and support of Pro Child Hospital in Rio de Janeiro are some examples of the group's activities in recent years.

In Rio de Janeiro, EBX Group will allocate R$ 20 million a year until 2014, to the Pacifying Police Units (UPPs) project, a new model of public safety and policing. The funds will be used by the Rio de Janeiro State Security Department to purchase equipment and for investment in construction of infrastructure and logistics for its units.

EBX Group also invests in historical and cultural preservation. In the city of Belo Horizonte, it created and maintains the Mines and Metals Museum (MMM), which has been designed to showcase the relationship between the history and culture of Minas Gerais through two major economic activities of the state: mining and metallurgy. Dedicated to the state's major mines, there are 44 attractions and 11 major installations in 18 rooms, covering an area of almost 6,000 square meters (64,584 square feet). In virtual environments, visitors can interact with the spaces that were created, allowing them to dynamically experience the world of metals and minerals. The attractions were made more personal through MMM's historical and fictional characters, such as Dom Pedro II, the Baron de Eschwege and Xica da Silva, who introduce museum attractions to visitors in a playful and interactive manner.

== See also ==
- BNDES
- Eike Batista
