= Gloria (Irish singer) =

Irish singer (1951-)

Gloria Smyth (born May 1951), better known as Gloria, is an Irish singer from Navan, County Meath.

She rose to fame in Ireland during the 1970s with "One Day at a Time" which spent longer in the Irish charts than any other single to date (90 weeks). She later toured under her married name of Gloria Sherry.

== Career ==
The eldest of nine children, Gloria's father, Jimmy, was the leader of the Arcadians Showband. Her first experience on stage was at the age of 10 when she danced and played accordion with her father's showband. After leaving school, she found work playing piano with another band, before joining the Maurice Lynch Showband as a singer in the late 1960s.

It was as a solo singer however that she made her name in the 1970s. Gloria toured around Ireland singing alongside Johnny McEvoy during the early to mid 1970s before breaking out on her own. She began recording Gospel and Country songs in Nashville and appeared three times on the Praise the Lord show.

She found her greatest success in the late 1970s with her version of the song "One Day at a Time" which reached No. 1 in the Irish charts. It remained on the charts for 90 weeks - the longest run for any single in Irish chart history (a record it still holds today).

The single gained a UK release in December 1978, but failed to attract attention before Scottish singer Lena Martell scored a UK No.1 with it some months later. It came from her album When I Sing for Him, which was certified silver. She was popular in the dance halls at the time, singing with her backing band, The Mississippi.

Gloria announced her retirement in May 2001, when she turned 50. However, she later returned to music, performing with her sister Patrice. They are based in their native Navan, County Meath.

== Personal life ==
She married Don Sherry, a musician with a showband in 1973 and they had a daughter Laura and a son Paul. Gloria and her husband's marriage ended in 2010.

== Discography ==
=== Albums ===
- 1977 Gloria Darling
- 1978 When I Sing for Him
- 1978 Gloria's Irish Startime
- 1979 One Day at a Time (re-issue of When I Sing for Him)
- 1980 Gloria

=== Singles ===
- 1972 "Just The Way I Am / Happy Times" (with the Johnny McEvoy Band)
- 1973 "Tomorrow Is Forever" (with the Johnny McEvoy Band) - IRE No. 14
- 1975 "Bedtime Story" (with the Johnny McEvoy Band)
- 1977 "I'll Get Over You" (with Mississippi) - IRE No. 9
- 1977 "Tennessee Mountain Home" (with Mississippi)
- 1977 "One Day at a Time" (with Mississippi) - IRE No. 5
- 1978 "Liffey Tinker" - IRE No. 12
- 1978 "One Day at a Time" (re-issue) - IRE No. 1
- 1980 "My Younger Days" - IRE No. 25
- 1981 "Rest Your Love on Me" (with Brendan Quinn) - IRE No. 15
- 1981 "Come by the Hills"
- 1982 "Pal of My Cradle Days" (with Mississippi) - IRE No. 17
