= La Gloria =

La Gloria may refer to:

- La Gloria, Cesar, Colombia
- La Gloria, Texas, United States
  - La Gloria, Jim Wells County, Texas
  - La Gloria, Starr County, Texas
- La Gloria, Veracruz, Mexico
- La Gloria, Bocas del Toro, Panama
- La Gloria, Isla Margarita, a mountain in Venezuela, site of a 1974 airplane crash caused by Tropical Storm Alma
- La Gloria (Titian), Museo del Prado, Spain

== See also ==
- "Viva La Gloria", a song by Green Day from 21st Century Breakdown
