= Gloria Bash =

Congolese singer (born 2002)

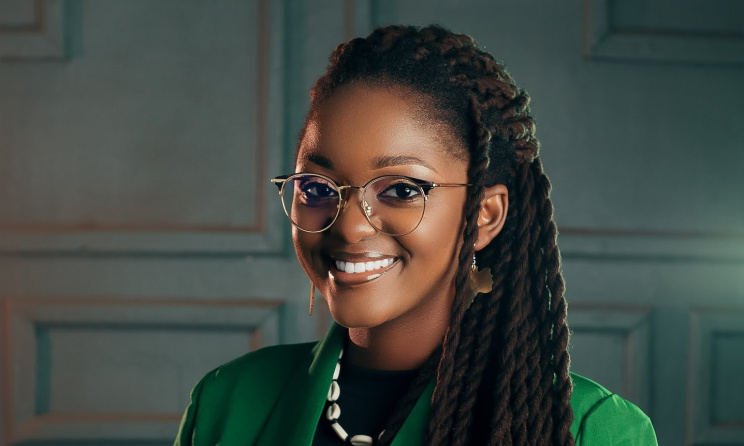

Background information
- Also known as: Gogo
- Born: Gloria Bashige Nehema; 25 December 2002 (age 23); Bukavu, South Kivu, Democratic Republic of the Congo
- Genres: Congolese rumba; Afrobeats; zouk; amapiano; gospel
- Occupations: Singer; songwriter; cover artist
- Instrument: Vocals
- Labels: Playone France; Black Star France
- Website: gloriabash.com

Gloria Bashige Nehema (born on 25 December 2002), known professionally as Gloria Bash, is a Congolese singer-songwriter from Bukavu who rose to prominence through social media in 2022 after posting online covers, medleys, and mashups of songs by established artists. Often referred to as "Gogo", she mainly performs in Swahili, French, and Lingala.

Raised in Goma, she gained widespread recognition for her medley reinterpretation of Fally Ipupa's album Tokooos II, which earned her the nickname "the female Fally Ipupa" among fans in the Democratic Republic of the Congo. She later competed in Season 8 of Vodacom Best of the Best All Stars, the Congolese version of the international Idol franchise. Following the competition, she released several singles before issuing her debut Extended Play (EP) Patrona in 2025, followed by her second EP, Zoshi, in 2026.

== Life and career ==
=== 2002–2023: Childhood, career beginnings and education ===
Gloria Bash was born Gloria Bashige Nehema on 25 December 2002 in Bukavu, located in the province of South Kivu in eastern Democratic Republic of the Congo. She is the youngest of six children born to Pontient Bashigi and Pelagi Bujiriri. Raised in Goma in North Kivu, she started singing at the age of 10 in the children's Redemptoris Mater choir of the Bienheureuse Anuarite parish at the Catholic Church. At 16, she stepped away from the choir to pursue modeling. A year later, she joined the Foyer Culturel de Goma, where she trained in poetry, slam, public speaking, writing, and critical thinking. Bash had also been active in theater since the age of 12, and she later described her time at the Foyer Culturel de Goma as an important foundation in her development.

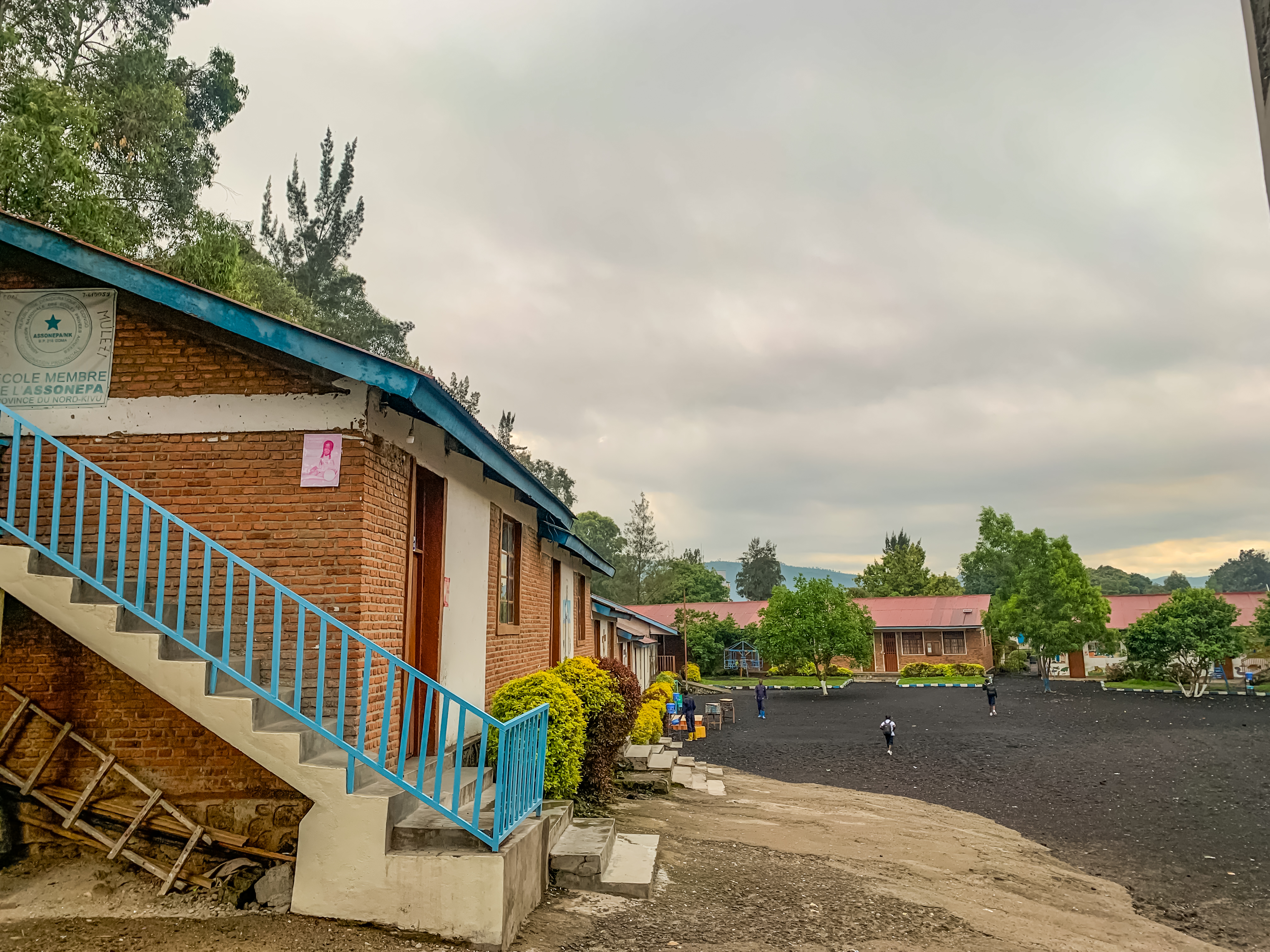
Bash attended primary education at Mama Mulezi school (pictured here in Goma)

She completed kindergarten at Saint Vincent de Paul, attended primary school at Mama Mulezi, and earned her state diploma in biochemistry from Collège Mwanga de Goma. After graduating in 2019, she enrolled at Université Catholique La Sapientia. In 2023, she graduated with distinction with a bachelor's degree in legal, political, and administrative sciences.

=== 2022–2024: Rise on YouTube, Vodacom Best of the Best All Stars, and releases ===
During an interview with Eventsrdc Radio in February 2022, Bash cited Fally Ipupa as her main musical inspiration and role model. She explained that she wanted audiences to discover her through his music because she admired his artistry and his approach to music. Encouraged by a close friend to pursue her musical talent, she created her first official YouTube channel in January 2022. Although concert halls and entertainment venues were shut down during the COVID-19 pandemic, she continued performing online through covers, medleys and mashups of songs by popular artists. Her breakthrough came through a medley reinterpretation of Fally Ipupa's sixth studio album Tokooos II. Bash told Eventsrdc Radio that she had always wanted to revisit Tokooos II in a different musical style because she had loved it since its release on 25 February 2022. With support and guidance from her manager, she used the project as a way to introduce herself to the public with something distinctive. Bash also briefed the press that she does not confine herself to one musical genre, as she feels comfortable adapting to different styles. The medley became popular in the Democratic Republic of the Congo and earned her the nickname "the female Fally Ipupa" from fans.

In August 2022, she competed in Season 8 of Vodacom Best of the Best All Stars, the Congolese adaptation of the international reality TV franchise Idol, which was organized by Vodacom Congo and Pygma Communication. The competition offered a $20,000 prize along with a recording contract with Sony Music Africa. She represented North Kivu and performed the 2003 zouk song "Mon Soleil" by Martinican singer Princess' Lover during the third round, but her performance "failed to impress the jury" and she did not qualify for the final after receiving scores of 4/10, 4/10, and 3/10. Jury member Koffi Olomidé stated that she was not the contestant he would have chosen to represent the country, particularly because the round's theme was "You must convey emotion".

By September 2022, Bash's YouTube covers were rapidly gaining attention. Her most viewed video was an Amapiano-style cover of Buga by Kizz Daniel and Tekno, which reached 2.2 million views in three months. This was followed by her cover medley of Tokooos II with 695,000 views in six months, while her video "Le mélange de la musique ivoirienne et congolaise" ranked third with 433,000 views in five months. On 13 January 2023, she released the Amapiano-inspired single "Koleya Money" through Playone France. She later released "Alakini" on 20 June, a song centered on hope, solidarity, and unity amid the ongoing M23 conflict in eastern Congo. The same theme continued with "To Kufi", released on 15 February 2024. On 14 May 2024, Bash collaborated with rapper Yvon Yusuf on "Mbele". The Swahili title means "ahead" or "forward", and the song encourages perseverance and ignoring criticism. She later appeared on "Épuisée" by Butembo-born rapper Alia Kas on 26 June, although the music video had premiered earlier on 15 June. On 24 August 2024, Bash released the Afrobeats-inspired single "Cascade" under Black Star France, the label founded by Cameroonian businessman and producer Walter Tchassem, rapper Timati and Congolese-French singer and rapper Gims to promote young French and African talent internationally. In December 2024, she officially signed with the label after Gims reportedly discovered her talent during a visit to Goma. That same month, she released the single "Toza Bien".

=== 2025–present: Solidarité Congo concert, standalone releases, Patrona, and Zoshi ===
On 7 March 2025, Bash released "Ada". The next month, on 22 April, during the Solidarité Congo benefit concert at Accor Arena attended by more than 22,000 spectators, Gims surprised the crowd by inviting her onstage during his closing performance. After performances by artists such as Youssoupha, Singuila, Gazo, Dadju, and Fally Ipupa, she performed several of her own songs. On 4 July, Bash issued the single "Fond de teint", which was described by Radio France Internationale as "a true declaration of self-love" that encourages young women to value themselves beyond physical appearances. She later released "Mabega" on 12 September.

Her debut Extended Play (EP), Patrona, was issued on 1 November 2025 and featured nine songs plus a bonus track. It was by singles "Koleya money", "Hau Shalange", "Love Taste", and "Die Die". On 7 November, she followed with the zouk-inspired love song "Amour Amour", which is noted for its "perfect symphony of meticulously combined instruments". She later released "Toleka" on 19 December and "Milele" on 6 March 2026.

On 10 May 2026, Bash released her second seven-track EP, Zoshi, which features two bonus tracks and a guest appearance by The Mingongo.

== Controversies ==
=== AI-generated image ===
On 25 November 2025, a photo showing a young woman in a bikini on a beach began circulating on the Facebook page Kivu Masolo, which had more than 2,600 followers. The post described the image as a "sexy revelation for the first time" and alleged that the woman was Bash. According to the accompanying rumor, the picture had supposedly been taken in Kinshasa during celebrations surrounding her song "Mabega", which premiered on 12 September 2025. The image was widely shared across social media, and it soon fueled confusion and spread misinformation among internet users. As commonly happens with sensational online content, the image circulated rapidly without verification.

Bash denied being the woman shown in the image, stating: "...You can clearly see that it's an image created with AI". Eleza Fact, a fact-checking organization based in Goma, launched an investigation that combined Bash's direct testimony with technical examinations using AI-detection tools. Hive Moderation, a professional platform specializing in identifying AI-generated visuals, assigned the image a 98.4% probability of being artificially generated. A second analysis conducted with Fake Image Detector, another tool designed to identify manipulated or computer-generated visuals, also confirmed that the picture had been digitally created or altered. Isabelle Kasoki of Eleza Fact stated that the incident represented a form of gender-based digital violence in which artificially suggestive images are used to sexualize and humiliate women. As part of the 16 Days of Activism campaign, the organization stressed that sharing intimate or allegedly intimate content without consent — even when created through artificial intelligence — amounts to violence intended to undermine women's dignity, reputation, and emotional security. Kasoki added that such practices can encourage blackmail, stigmatization, and societal pressure, especially toward women who hold public visibility or political influence.

== Discography ==
=== EPs ===
- Patrona (2025)
- Zoshi (2026)
