= Musselwhite =

Musselwhite is a surname. Notable people with the surname include:

- Charlie Musselwhite (born 1944), American musician
- David Musselwhite (1940–2010), British literary critic
- Harry W. Musselwhite (1868–1955), American politician
- Paul Stephen Musselwhite (born 1968), English footballer
- William Ralph Musselwhite (born 1887), Archdeacon of Lynn
