= Gloria Buzău =

Gloria Buzău may refer to:

- FC Gloria Buzău, a football club currently playing in the Liga I, Romania's SuperLiga.
- SCM Gloria Buzău (women's handball), a women's handball club in Buzău, Romania
- SCM Gloria Buzău (rugby), a rugby club in Buzău, Romania
