= Glòria Muñoz =

Spanish painter (born 1949)

- Born: Glòria Muñoz Pfister; 12 August 1949 (age 77); Barcelona, Spain
- Education: Escola Superior de Belles Arts Sant Jordi; University of Barcelona
- Known for: Painting
- Website: www.gloriamunoz.es

Glòria Muñoz (born 12 August 1949) is a Spanish painter, and professor of painting at the University of Barcelona.

== Life and work ==
Glòria Muñoz Pfister was born on 12 August 1949 in Barcelona, Spain. Her family was artistically inclined. She studied in Barcelona at l'Escola Superior de Belles Arts Sant Jordi, completing her art coursework in 1972. In the same year, she married Josep, whose father, painter and professor Josep Puigdengolas Barella, helped her meet important members of Barcelona's exclusive art community. This opportunity, combined with her desire to explore new methods of artistic expression, influenced her to create paintings which can trace their origins to early twentieth-century art.

In 1975, the year of her first solo exhibition, she founded an art education center, Taller de Dibuix i Pintura, in Barcelona. She has been a professor of painting in the University of Barcelona's Department of Fine Arts since 1985, and in 1990 she received a doctorate degree in fine arts from the same institution. In 2000, she was a member of the Madrid Ministry of Education's "Contemporary Realism" project.

== Art ==
In 1980, Muñoz concentrated on painting landscapes. Her primary subject was the scenery of Empordà in northeastern Spain, but other locations in Spain (Majorca, Granada, Cap de Creus, Cadaqués, Castelló d'Empúries, El Port de la Selva, and Peralada), Italy (Tuscany), and Southern France were also depicted in her landscapes. Later in her career, she focused on different subjects. Some of her later still lifes contain an arrangement of objects and a perspective which appear more like those typical of a landscape.

A convent in Peralada which had been abandoned by its Augustinian nuns became the location for Muñoz's studio when, in 1993, she acquired the convent's chapel for that purpose. This setting provided her much artistic inspiration as she depicted many of her chapel-studio's details in her paintings. In her Empty Altars series, she painted the chapel's timeworn altar. Her works in this important series, comparing full and empty, present and absent, living and dead, symbolically allude to the passage of time, and the separation between the spiritual and the worldly. The relationship between the spiritual and the physical world is a theme which may be discerned in much of her work throughout her career.

Her palette often consists predominantly of blue and ochre hues. Her work primarily depicts everyday objects, but there is usually a deeper meaning than a simple portrayal of these ordinary subjects. For example, some of her favorite subjects to paint, tables, represent more than merely furniture; they are symbolic of the unique and transient nature of human life. The tables may contain various objects which allegorically relate to a person's life. These tableaus may be intended to evoke an emotional response from the viewer. For Muñoz, a table and any objects on it may represent the entire world or a reality, the many possible forms and configurations representing the vicissitudes of life.

Muñoz often succeeds in meshing elements which seem to be from contrasting worlds and with different values, while still having those elements complement one another.

== Exhibitions and collections ==
Starting in 1988, she has had frequent solo and group exhibitions at Barcelona's Sala Parés, one of the most prominent and highly regarded galleries in the city.

Her work has also been featured in shows, both solo and group, at many other galleries in Barcelona, as well as in other cities, including Bologna, Buenos Aires, Carmel, Geneva, Girona, Hong Kong, London, Madrid, Miami, New York City, Olot, Singapore, Strasbourg, and Toulouse.

In 1998, she had a solo exhibition at the Museu d'Art Modern in Tarragona, Spain, and her work is in the museum's permanent collection. She was represented in a group show at Museo de Sant Feliu de Guíxols in 2005.
