= Dommo Energia =

Brazilian energy company

- Company type: Privately held company
- Industry: Oil and gas
- Founded: 2007 as OGX
- Founder: Eike Batista
- Headquarters: Rio de Janeiro, Brazil
- Key people: Roberto Bernardes Monteiro
- Products: Crude oil Natural gas
- Revenue: ▲US$ 368.1 million (2013)
- Net income: ▼ - US$ 7.3 million (2013)
- Parent: PetroRio
- Website: dommoenergia.com.br

Dommo Energia is a Brazilian publicly listed oil and gas company. Until 2017 it was known as OGX Petróleo e Gás Participações S.A. (OGX). Prior to a 2013 bankruptcy filing, OGX was Brazil's second-largest oil company by market value after Petrobras.

On September 1, 2022, PetroRio announced the purchase of Dommo Energia. On October 24, PetroRio approved the incorporation of the company. With the transaction, the company now owns 100% of the Tubarão Martelo field.

== History ==
OGX was founded in 2007. In June 2008 it held initial public offering and the company was listed at BM&F Bovespa.

In September 2009, the company started its exploration activities. At the same year OGX made its first oil discovery at the Waimea offshore field and on 31 January 2012 it started oil production. It made several other oil discoveries.

In 2010, it discovered oil at the Pero and Inga fields in Block BM-C-40.

In 2013 OGX was forced to file for bankruptcy protection in the Court of Justice of Rio de Janeiro after defaulting on a $45m bond payment.

OGX was renamed Dommo Energia in 2017.

In 2023, after the acquisition, Dommo Energia went closed its capital on the stock exchange.

== Operations ==
OGX is engaged in onshore and offshore exploration and production activities. It owns exploratory blocks in the Campos, Santos, Espírito Santo, Pará-Maranhão and Parnaíba basins in Brazil and the Cesar-Ranchería, Lower Magdalena Valley and Middle Magdalena Valley basins in Colombia.

Its Waimea field in the Campos Basin is producing about 12,500 barrels per day (1,990 m^{3}/d) with expected output rise to 40,000–50,000 barrels per day (6,400–7,900 m^{3}/d) by the end of 2012. Production at the Gaviao Real field is expected to start in 2012 and at the Waikiki field in 2013.

== See also ==
- Eike Batista
