= Glória, Rio de Janeiro =

Glória
- Neighborhood
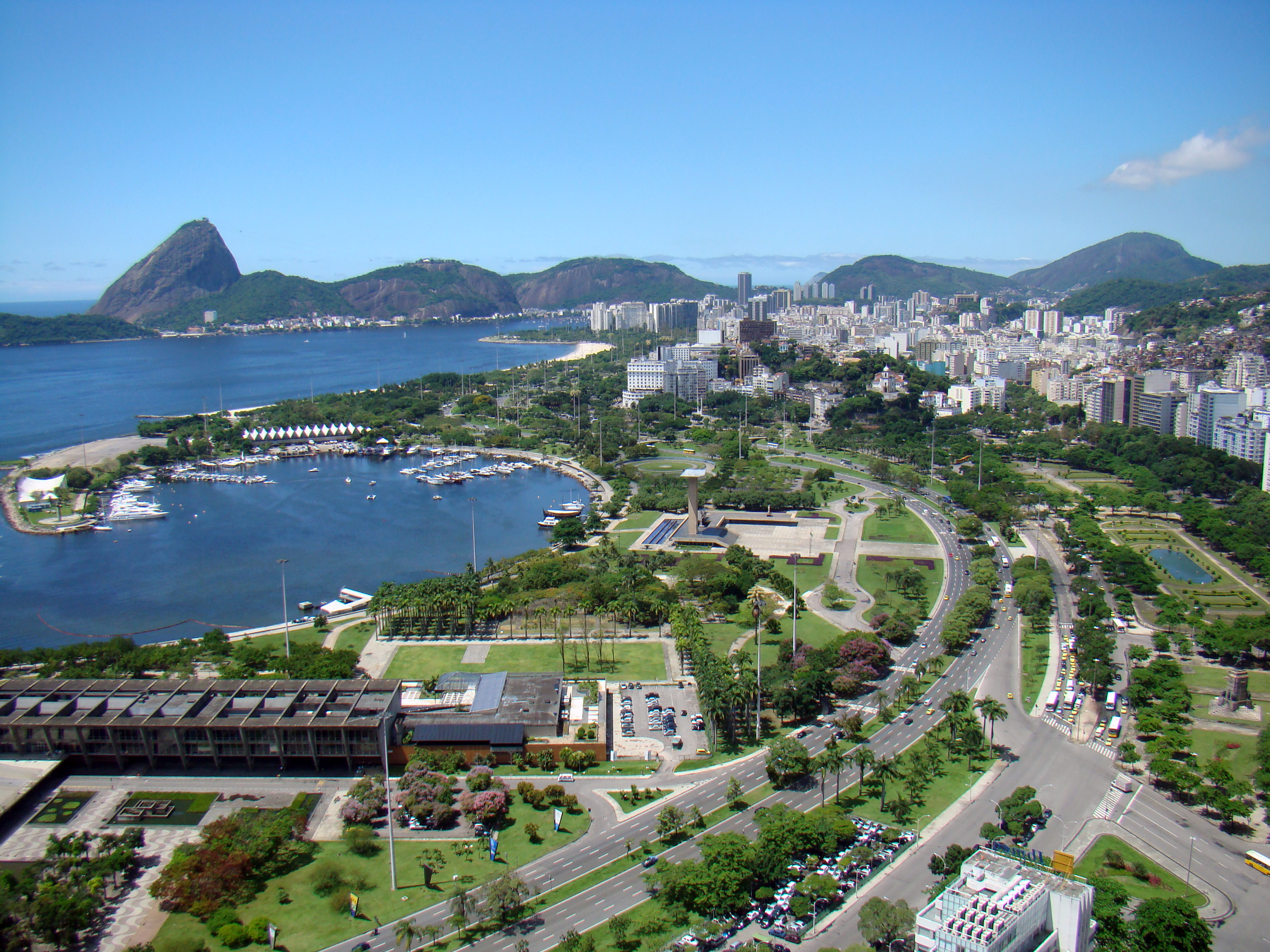
- Aerial view of Glória

- Location in Rio de Janeiro Glória (Brazil)
- Coordinates: 22°55′15″S 43°10′25″W
- Country: Brazil
- State: Rio de Janeiro (RJ)
- Municipality/City: Rio de Janeiro
- Zone: South Zone

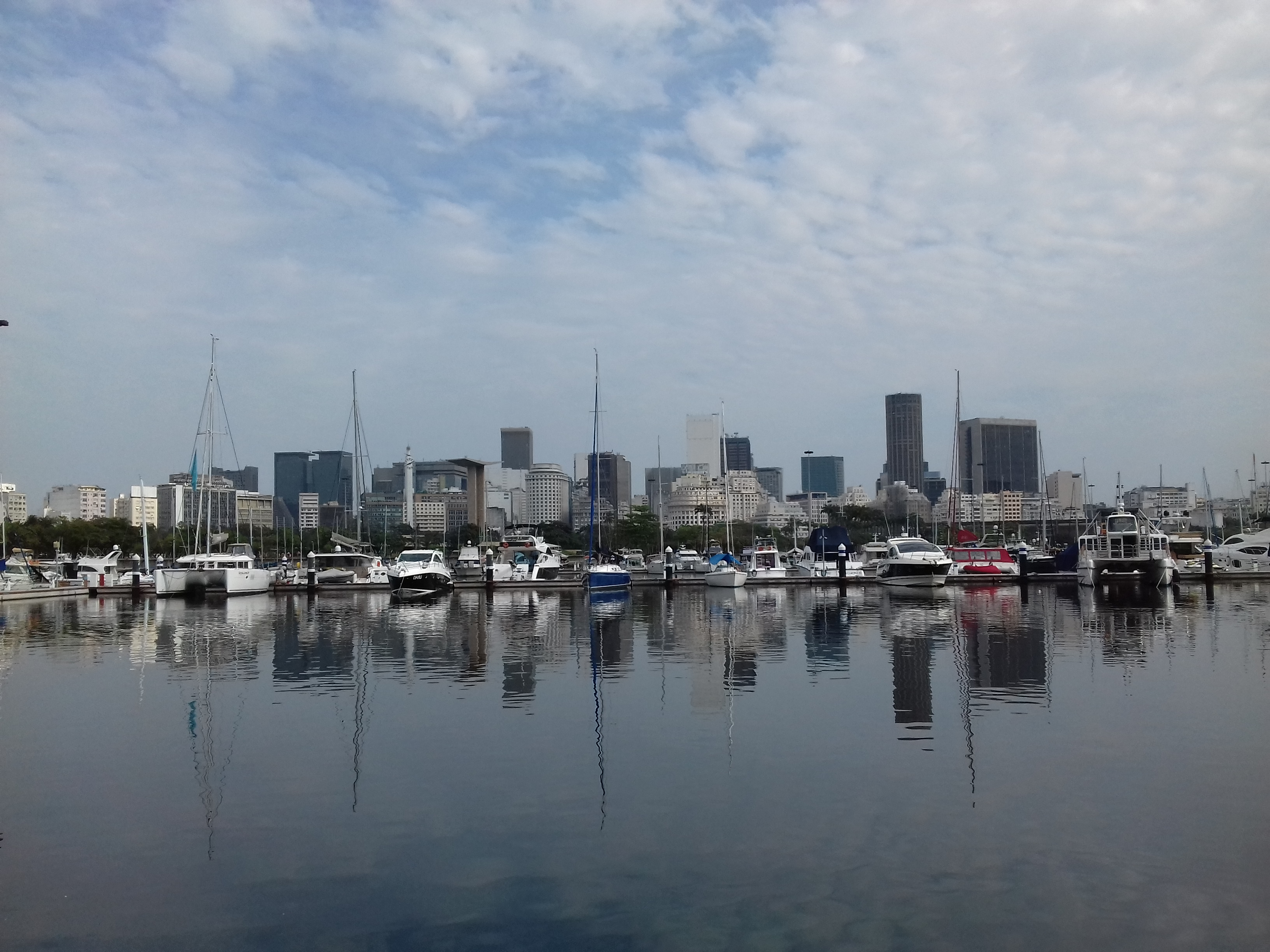
View of Marina da Glória.

Glória is a middle-class neighborhood of the city of Rio de Janeiro, Brazil. It is located between the neighbourhoods of Centro and Flamengo, Rio de Janeiro.

== History ==
In the 16th century, the base of Glória Hill was the site of a Tupí people village called Karioca. This village gave the name of the modern demonym of the city: carioca.

In the 17th century, the Nossa Senhora da Glória do Outeiro church was built, at the peak of Glória Hill. A 3 ft (914 mm) narrow gauge funicular railway, first opened in 1945, is employed to take visitors to the top of the hill.

In 1979, the Marina da Glória was inaugurated.
