= Eike Batista =

Brazilian businessman (born 1956)

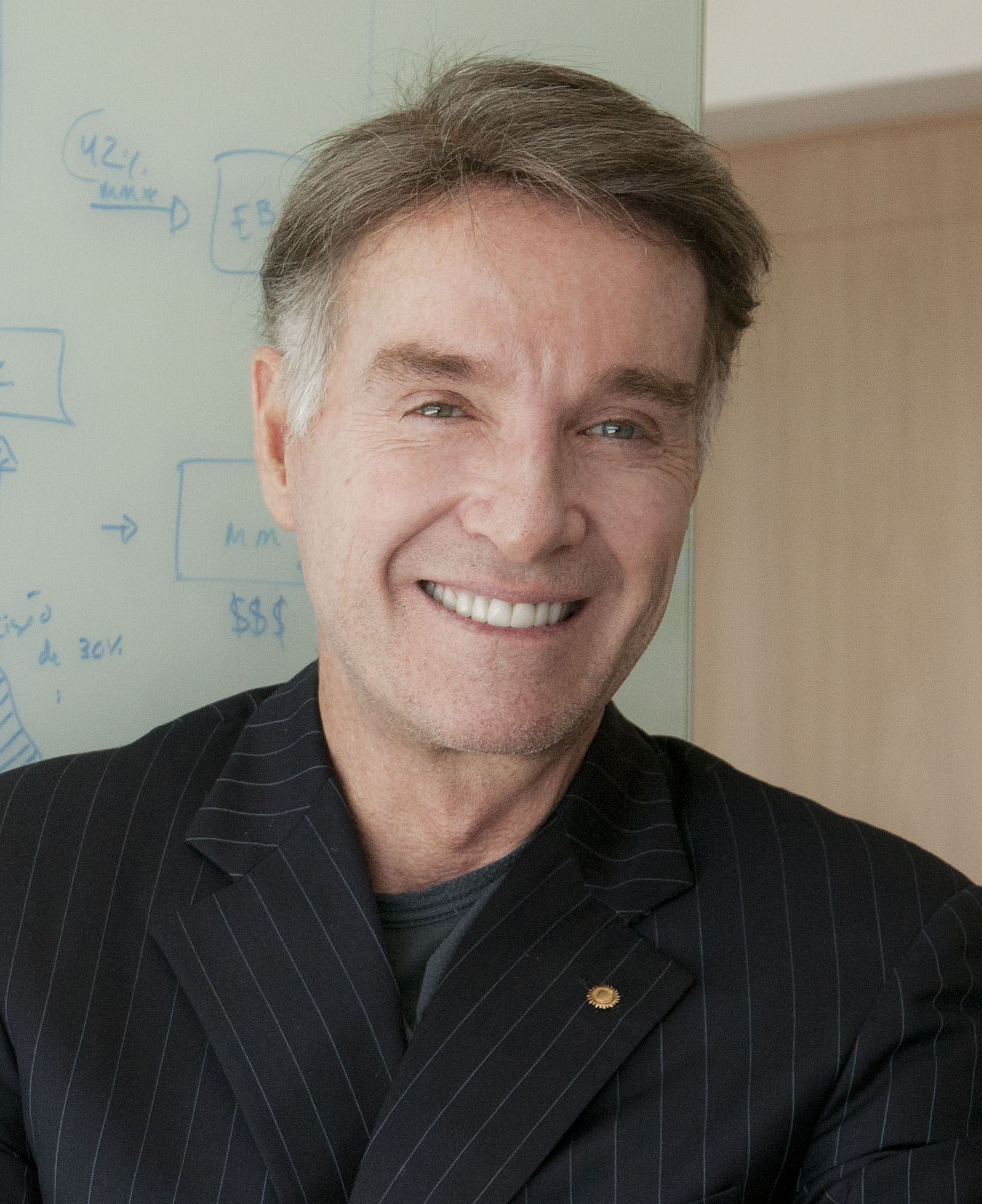
- Batista in 2011
- Born: Eike Fuhrken Batista da Silva; 3 November 1956 (age 69); Governador Valadares, Minas Gerais, Brazil
- Education: RWTH Aachen University (dropped out)
- Occupation: Businessman
- Known for: Former CEO of EBX Group
- Spouse: Luma de Oliveira (m. 1991; div. 2004)
- Children: 3
- Parent(s): Eliezer Batista da Silva (father); Jutta Fuhrken (mother)

Eike Fuhrken Batista da Silva (Portuguese pronunciation: [ˈajk(i) ˈfuʁkẽj baˈtʃistɐ dɐ ˈsiwvɐ]; born 3 November 1956) is a Brazilian businessman who made and lost a multi-billion dollar fortune in mining and oil and gas industries. He engaged in a quest to promote Brazil's infrastructure with large-scale projects, such as the Porto do Açu.

He was chairman of Brazilian conglomerate EBX Group, which was formerly the parent company of five companies traded on the BOVESPA's Novo Mercado, a special segment of the São Paulo stock market. These five companies were: OGX (oil and gas), MPX (energy), LLX (logistics), MMX (mining), and OSX (offshore services and equipment). Nowadays, EBX advises new startup companies and tries to rebuild itself again. In 2024, on the Market Makers podcast, Eike introduced a new biotech startup called BRX.

In early 2012, Batista's net worth was estimated at US$35 billion, ranking him as the seventh richest person in the world, and the richest in Brazil. By July 2013, his wealth had plummeted to $200 million due to his debts and declines in his companies' stock values. Bloomberg reported in January 2014, that Batista had a negative net worth. Forbes and Folha de São Paulo quoted Batista in September 2014, stating that his net worth was –$1 billion. Batista is currently under house arrest after being sentenced to 30 years in prison for several offences, including bribing disgraced Rio de Janeiro governor Sérgio Cabral Filho, in order to secure public contracts.

== Early life and career ==
Batista was the second of seven children of businessman Eliezer Batista, who was Minister of Mines and Energy in the João Goulart and Fernando Collor administrations and a former president of Companhia Vale do Rio Doce (now known simply as Vale), then wholly a state enterprise, between 1961–1964, and 1979–1986. His mother, Jutta Fuhrken, was born in Germany and, from her, Batista says he learned self-esteem and discipline, attributes he considers crucial to his formation as an entrepreneur. After spending his childhood in Brazil, Batista and his family moved to Europe when he was a teenager, due to his father's occupation. They lived in Geneva, Düsseldorf and Brussels.

In 1974, he began to study metallurgical engineering at the University of Aachen in Germany. When he was 18 years old, his parents returned to Brazil. Batista remained abroad and began selling insurance policies door-to-door to make his living. In interviews, he often mentions that the "stress" and the lessons learned from this experience were essential for his education.

Batista returned to Brazil in the early 1980s and focused his attention on the gold and diamond trades. He established himself as a salesman, contacting producers in the Amazon area and buyers in large metropolitan centers in Brazil and Europe. When he was 23 years old, he started a gold trading firm, called Autram Aurem, using the Inca Sun as the company trademark and symbol. A year and a half later, the company had earned US$6 million.

He implemented the first mechanized alluvial gold mining plant in the Amazon, marking the beginning of the EBX Group. At age 29, he became CEO of TVX Gold, a company listed on the Montreal Stock Exchange, initiating his relationship with global capital markets. From 1980 to 2000, he created US$20 billion in value with the operation of eight gold mines in Brazil and Canada and a silver mine in Chile.

Between 1991 and 1996, the value of his company more than tripled.

== Personal life ==
Batista married the model Luma de Oliveira in 1991, and divorced her in 2004. They had two boys, Olin and Thor. He later dated businesswoman and lawyer Flávia Sampaio for several years, with whom he had a third son in 2013, named Balder. Batista enjoys running, swimming and practices marine sports. In the 90s, he was the Brazilian, U.S. and World Champion in the Super Offshore Powerboat class. In 2006, he covered the 220 nautical miles between Santos and Rio de Janeiro in 3h01m47s and beat the record for the course in his boat, the Spirit of Brazil. Batista maintains an active digital life, with a personal site with articles, videos and news about his companies. The digital channel that Batista has chosen as his primary means of personal communication is Twitter. In 2011, Batista released the book The Heart of the Matter (O X da Questão) which recounts his trajectory in the business world and offers tips on entrepreneurialism.

== National and international rankings ==
In 2011, Batista was listed by Forbes magazine as the 8th richest person in the world and the richest person in Brazil. His wealth was at one time estimated at US$30 billion. Batista was also featured in Bloomberg Markets magazine as the only Brazilian on the list of the 50 most influential people in global finance, published for the first time in September 2011. The magazine focused on people “whose comments move markets; whose deals set the value of companies or securities; whose ideas and policies shape corporations, governments and economies”.

At the end of 2010, the magazine ranked Batista as the 58th most powerful person in the world, placing him as Brazil's most powerful person after the then-president of Brazil, Dilma Rousseff. The newspaper Folha de São Paulo described Batista as a "self-made man", an entrepreneur with a fortune acquired primarily through his own efforts, not inheritance.

The top-ranked Brazilian on the Forbes magazine list in March 2008 was Antônio Ermírio de Moraes, in 77th place with a family estate of US$10 billion. Another 17 Brazilians were on the list, including Batista (who in 2008 said his goal was to become the richest man in the world in five years). In 2008 Batista's fortune was estimated at US$6.6 billion and he was ranked at the 142nd place on the list of the richest men in the world. By 2009, he had moved up to the 61st position and was considered the richest man in Brazil.

According to the Brazilian weekly magazine Época, Batista was one of the 100 most influential men in Brazil of 2010. IstoÉ magazine also listed Batista as one of the 100 most influential people in 2010. In 2011, Batista was included in the 1,000 CEOs ranking by Dinheiro magazine.

== Projects ==
Since the 1980s, Batista created and put into operation eight gold mines in Brazil and Canada (Amapari, Casa Berardi, Crixás, Musselwhite, New Britania, Novo Astro, Novo Planeta and Paracatu), a silver mine in Chile (La Coipa), and three iron ore mines in Brazil (Mina 63, Tico-Tico and Ipé)."

All of Batista's companies were named with 3-letter combinations ending in the letter "X", which Batista believed was a symbol for the multiplication of wealth.

From 2004 to 2010, Batista created and put into operation five companies: MMX (mining), MPX (energy), OGX (petroleum), LLX (logistics) and OSX (offshore industry). As of 2013, due to falling commodity prices, none of his enterprises were profitable despite substantial infusions of cash by the Brazilian government, and Batista was engaged in desperate efforts to shed assets and meet the demands of creditors.

=== EBX ===
The EBX Group produces iron ore in Minas Gerais and Mato Grosso do Sul and has put the first commercial-scale solar power plant into operation in Brazil. It invested an estimated US$15.5 billion between 2011 and 2012 in Brazil and is responsible for projects of significant scale, such as the LLX Açu Superport in São João da Barra, Rio de Janeiro, the MMX Sudeste Superport in Itaguaí, Rio de Janeiro, and the MPX thermal power plants in Itaqui, Maranhão and Pecém, Ceará. These important energy and infrastructure projects are being executed in parallel to OGX's exploratory campaigns in Campos dos Goytacazes, Rio de Janeiro, Santos, São Paulo and Parnaíba, Maranhão basins, which have resulted in oil and gas discoveries. There were 20,000 people working in the construction and operation of the group's projects in 2011.

The EBX Group is headquartered in Rio de Janeiro and operates in nine Brazilian states. It has offices in New York City (USA), Colombia and Chile. In addition to the infrastructure and natural resources sectors, Batista's EBX Group also invests in real estate (REX), entertainment (IMX), technology (SIX) and catering (NRX). In Rio de Janeiro, EBX is developing sports, hospitality, gastronomy, health and beauty initiatives. Since the early 2000s however, Batista has focused primarily on natural resources, energy and infrastructure.

In April 2012, the EBX Group contracted International Business Machines Corp. to outsource EBX's IT operations.

=== MMX ===
MMX is the mining company of the EBX Group, with integrated logistics and low production costs. The company has projects in the Brazilian states of Minas Gerais and Mato Grosso do Sul, as well as in Chile.

=== MPX becomes Eneva SA ===
MPX operates in the energy industry in Brazil, Chile and Colombia. The company has complementary businesses in power generation, coal mining and exploration and production of natural gas. MPX was responsible for the first commercial solar power plant in Brazil in the city of Tauá. (CE) As part of the restructuring of the EBX companies under Batista, MPX was renamed Eneva SA and is now co-controlled by Germany's E.ON SE and Batista.

=== OGX now Óleo e Gás Participações ===
OGX was the EBX Group company which carries out activities in the exploration and production of oil and natural gas. The company was responsible for the largest private sector exploratory campaign under way in Brazil, claiming an early success rate in exploratory wells of more than 90% and initially valuing its deposits at more than $1 trillion. The company's wells turned out to be duds, however, and OGX filed for bankruptcy protection on 30 October 2013. In December the 2013, its shareholders voted to rename the company "Óleo e Gás Participações.", known simply as OGpar.

=== LLX now Prumo Logistical Global ===
LLX was the logistics company of the EBX Group, responsible for building the Açu Superport, in the state of Rio de Janeiro, projected to be the largest port-industrial complex in Latin America. As of 11 December 2013, LLX was renamed Prumo Logística Global by its new controlling parent, U.S.-based EIG Group.

=== OSX ===
OSX operates in the offshore shipbuilding industry and is constructing the largest shipyard in the Americas, the "Embraer of the Sea," at the Açu Superport. Different segments: shipbuilding, in the charter of Exploration and Production (E&P) equipment and Operation and Maintenance (O&M). Shipbuilding firm OSX, part of the EBX Group, Brasil made the filing in a Rio de Janeiro in November 2013 court less than two weeks after its sister oil company, OGX, also declared bankruptcy.

== Financial losses ==
On 26 July 2013, Bloomberg News reported his losses as "historic." The losses can be attributed largely to the downturn in the precious metals mining industry, as well as a catastrophic collapse of Batista's OGX — which had claimed would pump 750,000 barrels of oil a day, but ended up delivering only 15,000 barrels per day. Other economic issues and management decisions factored in as well. Bloomberg News likened events leading to the failure as a "Perfect Storm."

He publicly boasted several times that he would overtake Mexican billionaire Carlos Slim to become the world's richest man by 2015. However, akin to Japanese businessman Masayoshi Son, who lost over 90% of his fortune in the dotcom boom of 2000; Batista's wealth decreased by over 100% between March 2012 and January 2014, from a peak net worth of $32 billion to a negative net worth. Many business and finance-related media, such as Forbes magazine and Businessweek, are still in the process of concluding whether Eike Batista holds the record for having been the fastest destroyer of wealth. Eike Batista has written in Brazilian newspapers about the loss of his fortune and fall from billionairedom, stated that he regrets listing his companies in the stock markets, and that, in retrospect, a private equity model of financing his ventures would have been better. Batista pledged that he would leave no creditor unpaid, and would fulfill all of his debt obligations.

On 9 February 2015, Brazilian police seized cash and seven cars, including a white Lamborghini Aventador, from Batista.

== Enterprises ==
Major companies founded by Batista: EBX, OGX, MPX, MMX, LLX, OSX, REX, AUX, NRX Newrest, IMX, Gloria Palace, Marina da Glória, MDX, BEAUX, MR.LAM, PINK FLEET, and RJX.

== Arrest, conviction and sentencing ==
In January 2017, Brazilian authorities issued a detention order for Batista and eight other individuals as part of Operation Car Wash (Portuguese: Operação Lava Jato), a high-profile $100 million money laundering investigation. Batista returned from New York and was detained in the maximum security prison in Bangu. On April 28, 2017 Supreme Court judge Gilmar Mendes ordered Batista's release pending trial. Batista had been charged with making $16.5 million in bribes to the former governor of Rio de Janeiro state.

On July 3, 2018, Batista was provisionally convicted of performing unaccounted campaign contributions to former Rio de Janeiro governor Sérgio Cabral Filho, and was provisionally sentenced to imprisonment, pending appeal. Batista appealed the verdict, and its effects were nullified under the terms of the Plea Bargain agreement. On March 24, 2020, Eike Batista entered into a plea bargain agreement valued at US$160 million, which nullified the effects of all his criminal indictments, commuted his criminal convictions, and granted him release from imprisonment and/or house arrest—thereby setting him free.
