= Carajás =

Carajás may refer to:

- Carajás Mountains
- Carajás Mine
- Carajás Airport
- Canaã dos Carajás
- Eldorado dos Carajás
- Carajás (proposed Brazilian state)
- Carajas (spider)
- Karajá or Carajás, an indigenous tribe of Brazil
- Gurgel Carajás, a large SUV produced in Brazil
