= Timeline of strikes in 1988 =

Strikes in 1988

In 1988, a number of labour strikes, labour disputes, and other industrial actions occurred.

== Background ==
A labour strike is a work stoppage caused by the mass refusal of employees to work. This can include wildcat strikes, which are done without union authorisation, and slowdown strikes, where workers reduce their productivity while still carrying out minimal working duties. It is usually a response to employee grievances, such as low pay or poor working conditions. Strikes can also occur to demonstrate solidarity with workers in other workplaces or pressure governments to change policies.

== Timeline ==
=== Continuing strikes from 1987 ===
- First Intifada, including strikes, against the Israeli occupation of Palestine.
- 1987–1988 International Paper strike
- 1987–1988 Lunafil strike, 410-day strike by Sindicato de Trabajadores de Lunafil members in Guatemala.

=== January ===
- 1988 Delhi lawyers' strike, 75-day strike by lawyers in Delhi, India, demanding the resignation of police officer Kiran Bedi.
- 1988 Dublin firefighters' strike, strike by Dublin Fire Brigade firefighters, the first in 20 years.

=== February ===
- 1988 British nurses' strike
- 1988 Ford of Britain strike, 11-day strike by Ford of Britain workers.
- Karabakh movement, including strikes, in the Armenian Soviet Socialist Republic, demanding transfer of the Nagorno-Karabakh Autonomous Oblast to Armenia.
- 1988–89 P&O strike

=== March ===
- One-day general strike in Portugal against labour reforms.
- 8888 Uprising in Myanmar
- 1988 Argentina teachers' strike, 5-week nationwide strike by teachers in Argentina.
- March 1988 Panamanian strikes, series of strikes against the military dictatorship of Manuel Noriega, culminating in the 1988 Panamanian coup attempt.
- 1988 Snecma strikes, by SNECMA workers in France.
- 1988 Writers Guild of America strike, 153-strike by television and film writers in the United States, the longest strike in the Writers Guild of America at that point.

=== April ===
- 1988 Nigerian fuel strikes, series of strikes in Nigeria protesting increases in fuel prices.
- 1988 Polish strikes
- 1988–91 United States jai alai strike, 3-year strike by Jai alai players in the United States.

=== May ===
- 1988 Hyundai strike, 24-day strike by Hyundai Group workers in South Korea.

=== June ===
- 1988 Bell Canada strike, 10-week strike by Bell Canada workers, represented by the Communication Workers of Canada.
- 1988 New Zealand meatpackers' strike

=== July ===
- 48-hour general strike in Peru over wages.
- 1988 El Salvador electrical strike
- 1988 Groton strike, strike by General Dynamics Electric Boat workers in Groton, Connecticut.
- 1988 San Francisco nurses' strike

=== August ===
- 1988 ASUU strike, strike by Academic Staff Union of Universities members in Nigeria against structural adjustment, the first strike in the union's history.
- 1988 Falconbridge strike, 10-day strike by Falconbridge Nickel Mines workers in Canada.
- 1988 Mecsek strike, strike by coal miners in Mecsek, Hungary, against austerity.
- 1988 NYU strike, 3-week strike by clerical workers at New York University seeking wage parity with other workers at the university.
- 1988 United Kingdom postal workers strike

=== September ===
- One-day strike by journalists in India over new regulations on the press.

=== October ===
- 1988 Aqueduct strike, 13-day strike by jockeys at the Aqueduct Racetrack in the United States.
- 1988 Fernald strike, 10-week strike by workers at the Fernald Feed Materials Production Center in the United States.
- 1988 French embassies' strike, strike by diplomatic workers in French embassies and consulates.
- 1988 French nurses' strike, strike by nurses in France.
- 1988 New Haven Symphony strike, 2-month strike by New Haven Symphony Orchestra musicians.

=== November ===
- 1988 CSN strike, strike by Companhia Siderúrgica Nacional workers in Brazil.
- 1988 Louvre strike, strike by security guards at the Louvre, in France.
- 1988 Peruvian miners' strike, 8-week nationwide strike by miners in Peru.
- 1988 Petrobras strike, 10-day strike by Petrobras oil workers in Brazil.
- 1988 RATP strike, 6-week strike by RATP Group workers in France.

=== December ===
- 1988 Spanish general strike
