= MRS Logística =

Freight rail company located in Brazil

MRS Logistica S.A.
- Type: Sociedade anômina
- Traded as: B3: MRSA3B, MRSA5B, MRSA6B
- Industry: Logistics
- Founded: August 1996
- Headquarters: Rio de Janeiro, Brazil
- Area served: Southeast Brazil
- Key people: Guilherme de Mello, (CEO)
- Products: Rail logistics
- Revenue: ▲US$ 856.5 million (2021)
- Number of employees: 6,148 (2021)
- Website: mrs.com.br

MRS Logística S.A. (Malha Regional Sudeste, "Southeast Regional Network") is a freight rail company located in Brazil that operates 1,643 kilometers (1,021 mi) of track. It is the concessionary company that operates the Southeastern Federal Railroad Network (formerly SR3 - Juiz de Fora and SR4 - São Paulo of Rede Ferrovária Federal S/A), in the populous states of Minas Gerais, Rio de Janeiro, and São Paulo.

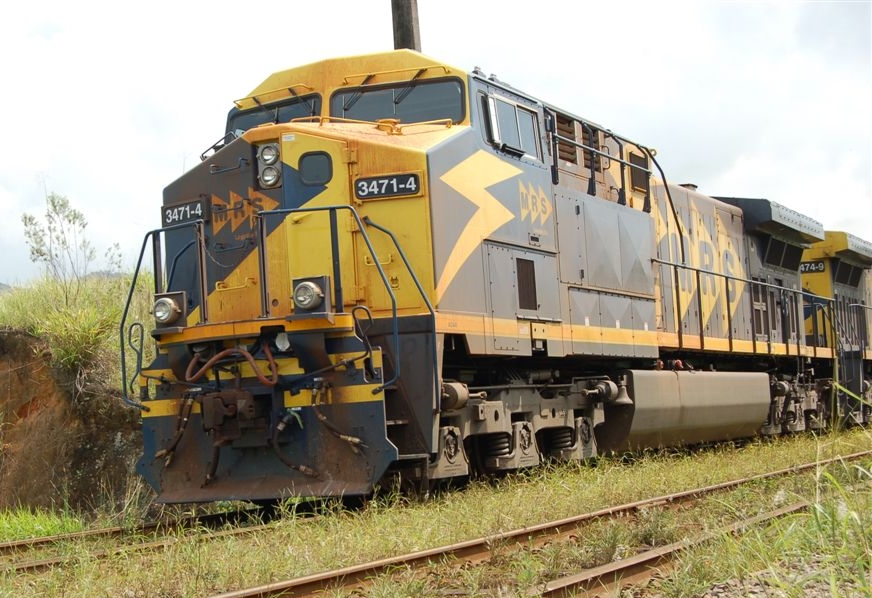
MRS GE AC44i MRS 347 Barreiro - Belo Horizonte

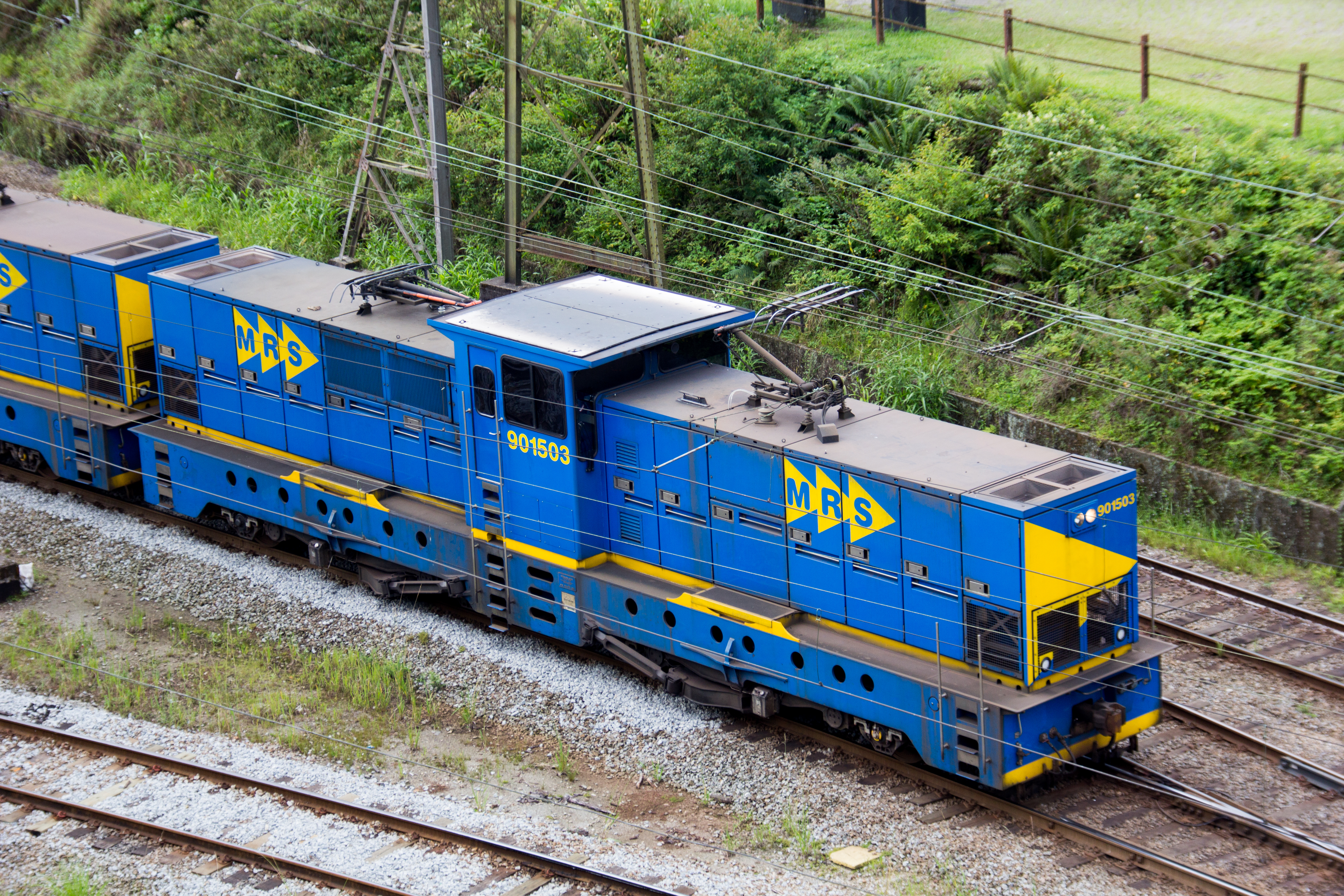
Earth's most powerful cog locomotive, the Stadler He 4/4, in Paranapiacaba, São Paulo, used on steep inclines.

== History ==
The company started in 1996, following the privatization of the state-owned Brazilian railway operator RFFSA. After winning a 30 year concession in auction for R$ 888.9 million, MRS was allowed to operate and maintain the southeastern Brazilian rail network, effective September 1996.

At the time, MRS's major shareholders were large steelmaking and mining companies, including the Companhia Siderúrgica Nacional, Usiminas, and Vale.

Its network combines the lines from Rio de Janeiro-São Paulo, Rio de Janeiro-Belo Horizonte, São Paulo-Santos and Ferrovia do Aço ("Railroad of Steel").

These lines are in the richest and populous area of Brazil (54% of Brazil's GDP), and MRS has connections to three of the most important seaports of Brazil: Rio de Janeiro, Itaguaí and Santos. The company also has a connection to the privately owned iron ore terminal of Minerações Brasileiras Reunidas (now part of Vale) in Ilha de Guaíba on Angra dos Reis bay.

The railway employs the world's most powerful cog locomotives on the line from Santos to São Paulo.

== Shareholder structure ==
As of 2021, the control of the company is shared by:

- Minerações Brasileiras Reunidas (a subsidiary of Vale): 32.9%
- Companhia Siderúrgica Nacional (CSN) - 18.6%
- Congonhas Minérios (a subsidiary of CSN) - 18.6%
- Usiminas Participações e Logística (UPL) - 11.1%
- Vale - 10.9%
- Gerdau - 1.3%
- other shareholders - 6.5%

== See also ==
- Rail transport in Brazil
- Transportation in Brazil
