= Henry Gale (cricketer) =

English cricketer

Personal information
- Full name: Henry Gale
- Born: 11 July 1836; Winchester, Hampshire, England
- Died: 3 March 1898 (aged 61); Westbourne, Hampshire, England
- Batting: Right-handed

Domestic team information
- Years: Team
- 1865–1866: Hampshire

Career statistics
Competition	First-class
Matches	6
Runs scored	144
Batting average	16.00
100s/50s	–/–
Top score	44
Catches/stumpings	2/–
- Source: Cricinfo, 30 December 2009

Henry Gale FICE (11 July 1836 – 3 March 1898) was an English first-class cricketer and civil engineer, who was mostly associated with the construction of railways.

The son of Richard Gale, he was born at Winchester in July 1836. He was educated at Marlborough College, where he played for the college cricket team. From Marlborough, he became a student of the civil engineer Alfred Giles, travelling with him to Canada on railway work. When he returned to England, he was employed by Sir James Brunlees on the construction of the Ulverstone and Lancaster Railway. In 1858, he joined the staff of the Madras Railway Company in British India, where he was employed for three years. However, the construction project on the north-west line was suspended and he returned to England, back to the employment of Brunlees. It was during this period that he played first-class cricket for Hampshire, making his debut against Middlesex at Islington in 1865. He made four further first-class appearances for Hampshire to 1866, all against Surrey. He also played one first-class match for the Gentlemen of the South, captained by W. G. Grace, against the Players of the South in 1866. In six first-class matches, he scored 144 runs at an average of exactly 16, with a highest score of 44.

Gale returned to India in 1866 (the same year that he was elected a fellow of the Institution of Civil Engineers), where he returned to work on projects associated with the north-west line. Ten years later, he went to Brazil to assist with the construction of the Dona Teresa Cristina railway on behalf of Cutbill Son and De Lungo; one complicated aspect of the line, which Gale had to solve, was to protect various points of the line from "extraordinary sand-drifts". He solved this by erecting sand-shields made of corrugated iron. For many years after, he continued to represent the company in South America, including sending plans to the Government of Uruguay for works in the Port of Montevideo. By 1888, he had returned to England and was the chief engineer for the company, but continued to advise with railway construction in South America, including the Midland Uruguay Railway and various others. Cutbill and Co. became The Railway and Works Company in 1892, with Gale one of its managing directors. He died in March 1898 at the Bournemouth suburb of Westbourne, and was buried in Winchester.
