= Ponta da Madeira =

Port in the city of São Luís, Brazil

Port of Ponta da Madeira
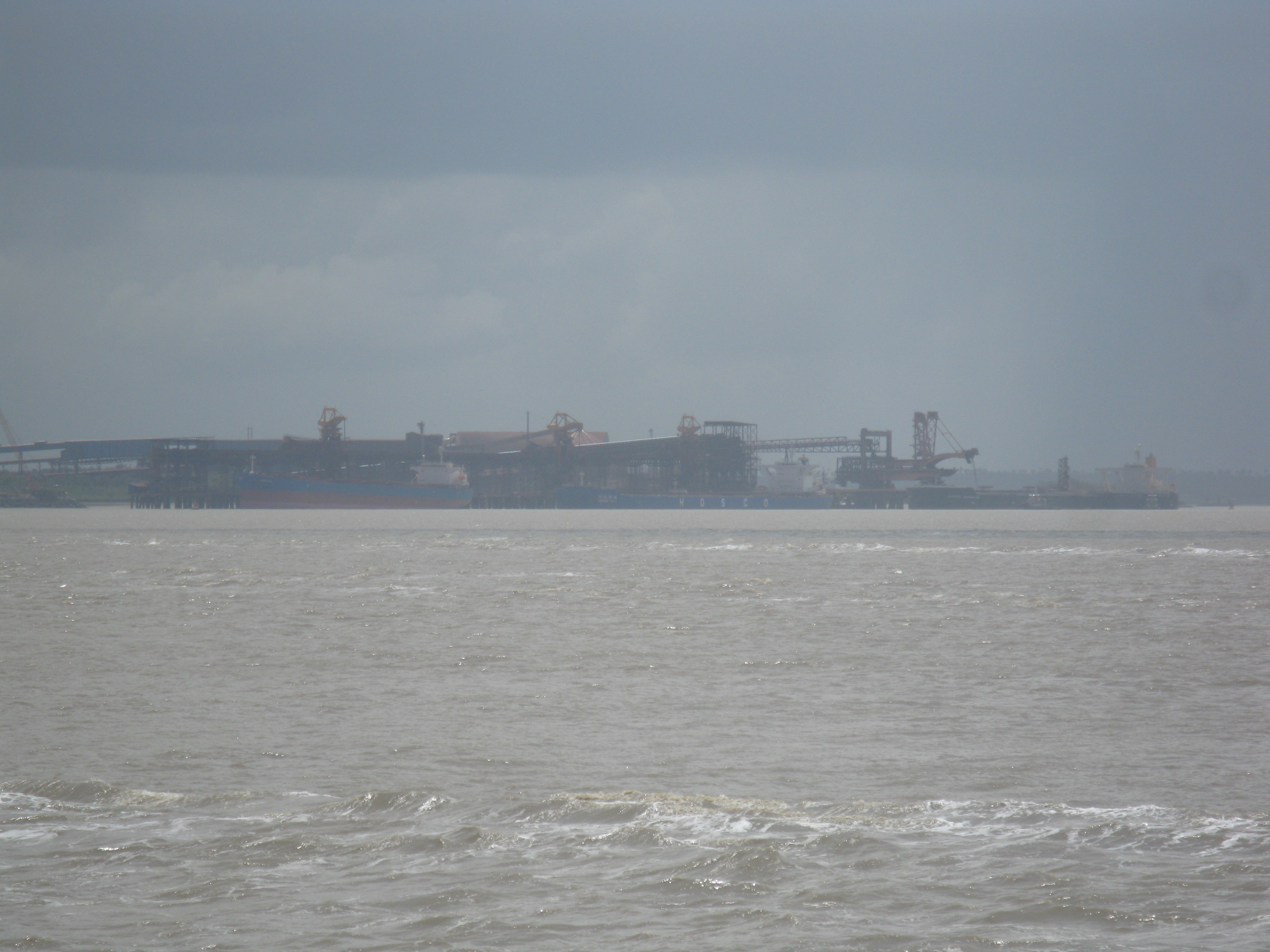
- Ponta da Madeira Terminal, seen from St. Mark's Bay
- Interactive map of Port of Ponta da Madeira

Location
- Country: Brazil
- Location: São Luís, Maranhão
- Coordinates: 2°33′38″S 44°21′44″W

Details
- Owned by: Vale S.A.
- Type of Harbor: Maritime

Statistics
- Annual cargo tonnage: 190,1 million tonnes (2020)

Ponta da Madeira is a Brazilian private port, a large iron ore loading port in São Luís, in the Northern part of Brazil, and one of the few terminals in the country suited for the ultra large Valemax ships. In 2020, the port of Ponta da Madeira handled 190.1 million tons. It's the national champion in cargo handling.

The Ponta da Madeira Maritime Terminal, owned by mining company Vale, sits next to the public Porto do Itaqui, in the state of Maranhão, in northern Brazil. It was chosen as the terminus of the Estrada de Ferro Carajas, where trains unload iron ore for shipping overseas, mainly to Europe and Eastern Asia. The terminal, abutting the Bay of São Marcos (St. Mark) has a natural draft of 26 meters (86 feet) at low tide; 14 m (46') tides proved a significant problem due to the strong currents generated, but those were circumvented through the placement of underwater concrete "breakers."

The terminal and Itaqui port are still primarily iron ports, but have increasingly also turned to other cargoes, especially bulk agricultural goods. The smallish container patio is dwarfed by the piles and holding areas of the iron wharves, capable of handling ships up to 500 m long and 500,000 metric tons in dead weight.

In recent years, Vale has announced its intention to build huge steelworks next to the terminal.

In 2012, the train journey from the ore mine to the port was featured in an episode of Countdown to Collision, broadcast by The Discovery Channel.

As of July 2013, the port is being expanded to handle large volumes of iron ore from the S11D mine near Carajas.

== See also ==
- Economy of Brazil
- Transport in Brazil
