= Carajás National Forest =

National forest in Pará, Brazil

- Floresta Nacional de Carajás
- IUCN category VI (protected area with sustainable use of natural resources)
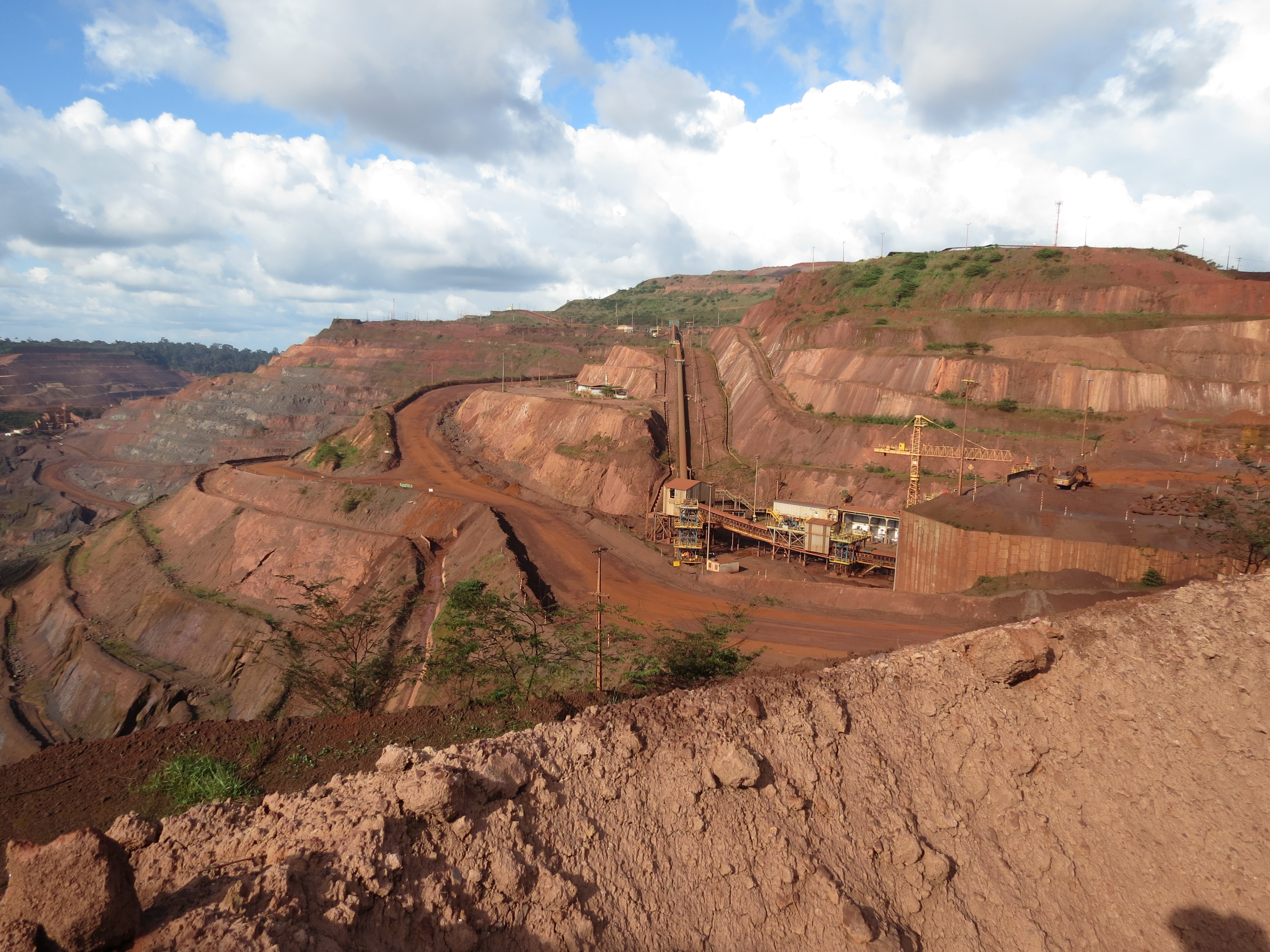
- Isa Carajas

- Location within Brazil
- Nearest city: Parauapebas, Pará
- Coordinates: 6.05898°S 50.17313°W
- Area: 392,725.14 hectares (970,445.0 acres)
- Designation: National forest
- Created: 2 February 1998

The Carajás National Forest (Portuguese: Floresta Nacional de Carajás) is a national forest in the state of Pará, Brazil. It covers the Serra dos Carajás (Carajás Mountains), an area with large deposits of iron ore, and attempts to combine the roles of supporting mineral extraction with preserving the environment and maintaining biodiversity.

== Location ==
The Serra dos Carajás is in the Amazon deforestation arc at the eastern end of a large forest area in Para. The Serra dos Carajás is a mountain complex about 160 by 60 kilometres (99 by 37 mi) with complex geology but with almost flat tops from 620 to 660 metres (2,030 to 2,170 ft) in altitude. The mountains were originally completely covered by moist equatorial forest. Temperatures average 21 to 22 °C (70 to 72 °F) with little variation throughout the year. The Carajás National Forest has an area of 392,725.14 hectares (970,445.0 acres). It covers parts of the municipalities of Canaã dos Carajás, Parauapebas and Água Azul do Norte in the state of Pará.

There are huge reserves of high quality iron ore and some manganese ore. These reserves were discovered accidentally by U.S. Steel in the 1960s. In 1970 a joint venture company was formed to exploit the deposit with the Vale mining company owning 51% and U.S. Steel owning 49%. In 1977 Vale acquired full ownership. Mining operations by Vale began in 1985. The Carajás Mine produced 301Mt of iron ore from the mine in 2008. In March 2012 Vale announced that it had obtained an installation license for the Carajás S11D iron ore project, the largest in the company's history with a US$19.671 billion capital expenditure.

== National forest objectives ==
The Carajás National Forest was created by decree 2.486 of 2 February 1998 with an area of 411,948.87 hectares (1,017,947.8 acres). By creating the national forest the government avoided the need to submit the grant of the mining concession to congressional vote. It is administered by the Chico Mendes Institute for Biodiversity Conservation (ICMBio). It is classed as IUCN protected area category VI (protected area with sustainable use of natural resources). The objective is sustainable multiple use of forest resources and scientific research, with emphasis on sustainable exploitation of native forest. The national forest seeks to reconcile mining with conservation of biodiversity.

The management plan, prepared jointly by the Brazilian Institute of Environment and Renewable Natural Resources and Vale, was approved on 30 April 2004. The plan's objectives include exploration, mining, processing, transport and marketing of mineral resources, promoting management of forest resources ecologically and economically, protecting water resources, scenic beauty, historical and archaeological sites and biodiversity, supporting scientific research and environmental education and promoting recreational activities, leisure and ecotourism.

== Conservation ==
After granting the mining concession the federal government created three protected areas around the concession: the Gelado Environmental Protection Area, the Tapirapé Biological Reserve and the Tapirapé-Aquiri National Forest. These areas, together with the Carajás Forest Reserve, form a continuous block around the Carajás Mineral Province. Vale occupies only 3% of the concession area. The company maintains the Vale Zoo and Botanical Park, open to the public. The forest is rich in biodiversity. Since the national forest was created there have been various studies of terrestrial vertebrates and aquatic invertebrates in the park. 594 species of birds have been catalogued, 68 of amphibians, 131 of reptiles and 44 of large and medium-sized mammals. Protected species include Uta Hick's bearded saki (Chiropotes utahicki) and the jaguar (Panthera onca). The proposed South Amazon Ecological Corridor would link the forest to other protected areas and indigenous territories in the region.

== Sources ==
- Ayres, José Márcio; Da Fonseca, Gustavo A. B.; Rylands, Anthony B.; Queiroz, Helder L.; Pinto, Luiz Paulo; Masterson, Donald; Cavalcanti, Roberto B. (2005), Os Corredores Ecológicos das Florestas Tropicais do Brasil (PDF) (in Portuguese), Sociedade Civil Mamirauá, archived from the original (PDF) on 2016-07-31
- "Carajas Iron Ore Mine, Brazil", mining-technology.com
- Flona de Carajás (in Portuguese), Chico Mendes Institute for Biodiversity Conservation, archived from the original on 2016-07-24
- FLONA de Carajás (in Portuguese), ISA: Instituto Socioambiental
- Floresta Nacional de Carajás completa 15 anos com dia de festa (in Portuguese), Vale, 25 February 2013
- Frederico D. Martins; Alexandre F. Castilho; Jackson Campos; Fernanda M. Hatano; Samir G. Rolim (2012), Fauna da Floresta Nacional de Carajás (PDF)
- "Pacote não ampliou preservação na Amazônia", Amazonia Legal (in Portuguese), archived from the original on 2017-05-10
- Unidade de Conservação: Floresta Nacional de Carajás (in Portuguese), MMA: Ministério do Meio Ambiente
- Vale obtains installation license for S11D, 4-traders, 7 March 2013
