= S11D =

Iron ore mine in Brazil

Coordinates: 06°03′48″S 50°09′36″W

S11D, or Serra Sul, is an iron ore mining project undertaken by Vale in Serra dos Carajás, Brazil. It is the largest iron ore mine project in the world, at 90 million tonnes per year.

== Project ==
The project is a $19.5 billion investment, which is key to Vale's future. Production began in December 2016, and the first ore was loaded on ships in January 2017. Production will reach 90 million tonnes of iron ore by 2018, but the transport infrastructure built as part of the S11D project will also support 230 Mt/y of production from other mines to the northeast near Carajas.

S11D will use truckless mining; shovels and mobile crushers will work at the mine face and feed directly onto conveyor belts, which take the ore to processing facilities. This lowers environmental impact and also mitigates the difficulty of finding many skilled staff in a remote area. Iron ore will be transported by rail to the Ponta da Madeira port terminal, which is being expanded to handle a very large increase in iron ore shipments. 504 km of new railway is being built, along with upgrades to 226 km of rail already serving the Carajas mines. It is one of the world's largest mines.

== Location ==
The mine is located in the mining concession area of the Carajás National Forest, accessible via road from Canaã dos Carajás in the Pará region of Brazil. The site has one of the world's richest ore bodies, with over 4 billion tonnes of reserves and ferrous content around 67%.
