= Davincci Lourenço de Almeida =

Brazilian citizen

Davincci Lourenço de Almeida is a Brazilian who became notorious in February 2017 when, because of a fake news campaign he himself had orchestrated online, he was able to trick journalists and be featured on the cover of Brazilian magazine IstoÉ. Titled “I delivered a bag of money to Lula”, the report, based solely on Davincci Lourenço de Almeida’s testimony, relates a series of crimes committed by Brazilian politicians and executives, including former president Luiz Inácio Lula da Silva.

Before the notoriety resulting from being on the cover of IstoÉ, Davincci Lourenço de Almeida was already a known personality on Brazilian social media, where he maintained dozens of different profiles. One of the victims of his online accusations was congressman Celso Russomanno (PRB-SP). Amongst the content published by Davincci was false information stating that the Brazilian government had intentionally spread Dengue and Zika virus, and references to working with NASA in projects involving alien technology.

== IstoÉ interview ==
On February 17, 2017, in edition number 2.462, IstoÉ magazine published a report based on interviews with Davincci Lourenço de Almeida in which he relates a series of crimes, including corruption and murder.

Davincci Lourenço de Almeida is characterized by the magazine as a “chemist without a college degree”, referencing allegations made by Davincci that he is the inventor involved in projects related to nanotechnology and a “revolutionary product to clean airplanes”.

== Legal action from Lula, repercussions and criticism ==
After publication of the IstoÉ report, former president Luiz Inácio Lula da Silva sued Davincci Lourenço de Almeida, as well as the magazine and journalists Sérgio Pardellas and Germano Oliveira.

In an official statement published on his website, the former president states that “IstoÉ magazine interviewed a person with no credibility and mentally unbalanced, that related a crazy story, without proper checking and printed accusations that have no merit in an attempt to slander the former president”.

In the legal documentation presented by Lula’s lawyers in the lawsuit some of Davincci Lourenço de Almeida’s social media posts are highlighted. In one of them, Davincci Lourenço de Almeida states that he was involved in meeting with “NATO agents” and personnel from NASA to really technology that he had invented: “in 1991 in a meeting (sic) with secret NATO agents I transferred to NASA engineers products of MILITARY NANOTECHNOLOGY uv30 as part of project […] Davincci Lourenço de almeida scientist of aeronautical NANOTECHNOLOGY […] I can prove that Project Blue Beam is plagiarism […] In this way the United Nations tribunal demandas that all nations, that launched nuclear weapons to disarm when the invasion.” (published in 01.31.2017).

The IstoÉ report generated repercussions in the Brazilian media and was challenged by other publication concerning the credibility of Davincci Lourenço de Almeida’s claims. The publication Jornal GGN published the story “IstoÉ source contradicts himself when accusing Lula”, the publication Revista Fórum published “Source that accused Lula in IstoÉ is clearly disturbed”, citing posts from Davincci’s social media accounts, and the publication Diário do Centro do Mundo published “Istoé loses all credibility and puts crazy man to accuse Lula”.

Amongst the content published by Davincci Lourenço de Almeida on his social media accounts that became apparent to the public after the IstoÉ report is a video in which he claims the Zika virus was created by the Brazilian government.

In various of his social media profiles it is possible to find photographs of Davincci Lourenço de Almeida using uniforms from the Brazilian Armed Forces, as well as North American police forces such as the FBI and NYPD.

== Celso Russomanno ==
One of the victims of Davincci Lourenço de Almeida’s online accusations on social media is congressman Celso Russomanno (PRB-SP), that in May 2017 released a vídeo on his official YouTube page to deny the claims. Davincci stated that Russomanno was involved in defrauding the 2016 municipal election in São Paulo.

The rumor that had spread through social media was dispelled in September 2016 by popular Brazilian website Boatos.org, dedicated to investigation rumors and “fake news”.

== Other lawsuits against Davincci Lourenço de Almeida ==
Besides the lawsuit by former presidente Lula, Davincci Lourenço de Almeida is also being sued by other people and corporations in Brazil for libel and defamation. Amongst the lawsuits is one from the company Vale Fertilizantes and executives and shareholders from the Camargo Corrêa group. Davincci is also investigated in a formal police inquiry in TRF-3 federal court.
