= Port of Tubarão =

Atlantic port in Espírito Santo, Brazil

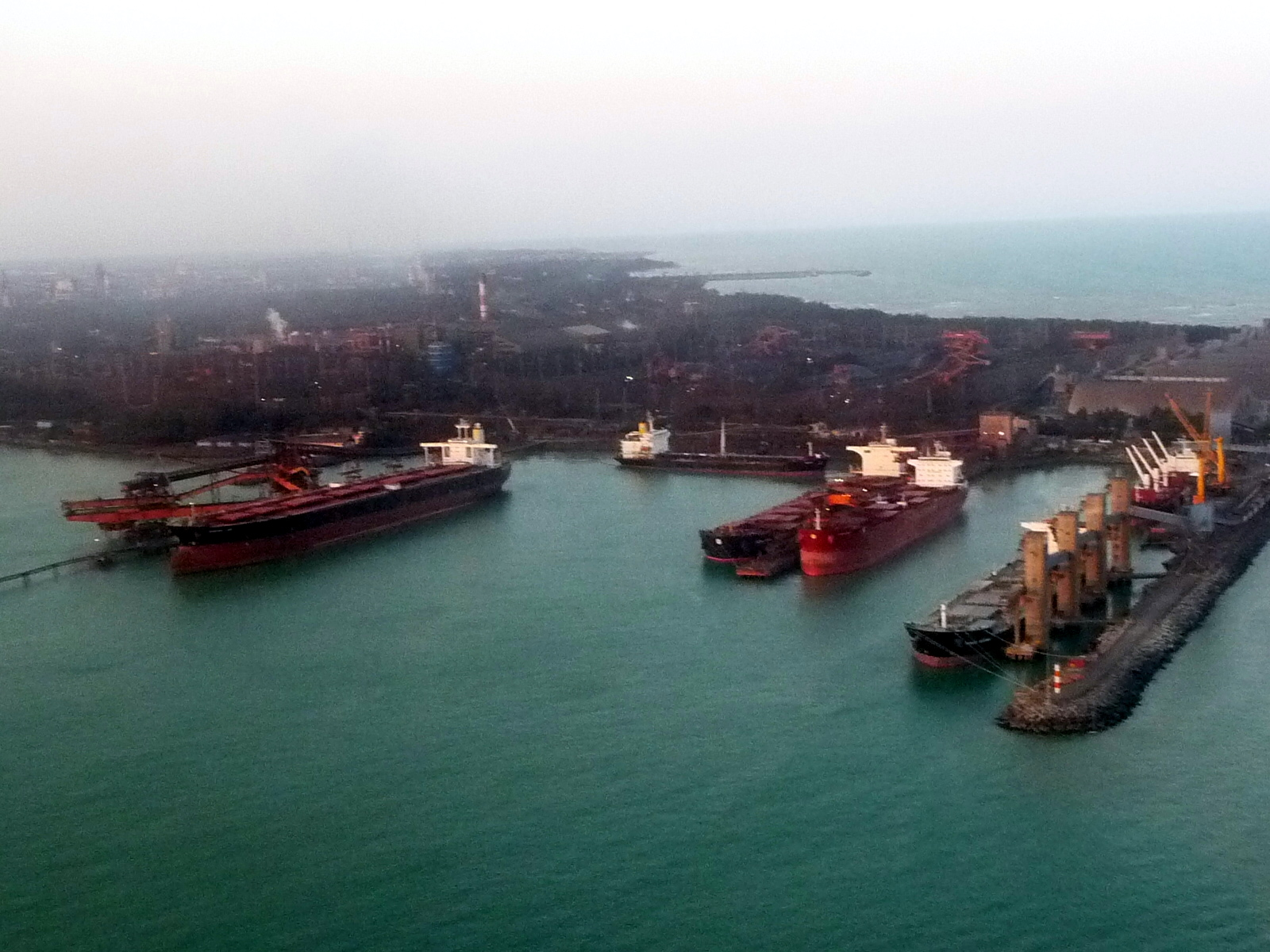
- Interactive map of Port of Tubarão

Location
- Country: Brazil
- Location: Vitória, Espírito Santo
- Coordinates: 20°17′10″S 40°14′39″W

Details
- Opened: April 1, 1966
- Owned by: Vale S.A.
- Type of Harbor: Maritime

Statistics
- Annual cargo tonnage: 103,9 million tonnes (2019)

The Port of Tubarão is a port in Brazil, near the city of Vitória in Espírito Santo. The port was created in 1966 by the Brazilian mining company Vale to export iron ore extracted from the Iron Quadrangle in Minas Gerais. In 2007, the Port of Tubarão was the largest iron ore embarking port in the world, shipping around 80 million metric tons of ore a year. Lesser port trade includes grain and soybean meal. Vale is still the owner of the port.

The port is among the fastest iron ore loading terminals in the world, with an average loading rate of 12,000 tonnes per hour and a nominal loading rate of 16,000 tonnes per hour.

== History ==
The construction of the port of Tubarão was started in 1962 by (then a mixed capital company) - Vale do Rio Doce., The year of the signing of the first long-term contracts for the supply of iron ore to Japan and Germany, and its construction was paid for entirely with funds from the National Treasury.

The port of Tubarão was a pioneering project - designed by Eliezer Batista (pt) - which helped create a new global logistics process in the transport of solid and liquid bulk. The participation of Japan in this enterprise was decisive and the construction of the port of Tubarão remains in the memories with sympathy of the Japanese until today:

Here, the pioneering project of the port of Tubarão deserves to be highlighted, which caused the greatest revelation in the global transport of solid and liquid bulk with the consequent evolution, in global terms, of a new system global logistics, which has transformed "physical distance" into "economic distance". It was possible to take a product of very low value over the greatest distances on the planet, economically.

Large bulk carriers and bulk carriers, as well as colossal oil tankers, are the fruits of this concept..

The contribution of the Brazilian steel industry has enabled Companhia Vale do Rio Doce to take a major first step with long-term contracts and technological assistance in the design and construction of large ships (new materials for new designs and their versatility). As a result, Docenave was created, which became the third largest bulk fleet in the world.

=== Funding ===
In possession of the iron ore supply contracts, Eliezer turned to Ex-Im Bank, the development bank of the United States, for financing for the construction of the port of Tubarão. But he failed: he came back empty-handed. The American bank did not extend any credit to Brazil, neither to Vale, nor to Japanese steel companies.

He explained his difficulties to the Minister of Finance at the time, during a hearing that has become historic:

Without funding to build the port of Tubarão, Eliezer turned to João Goulart (Jango) Finance Minister San Tiago Dantas. "He got up from his chair, took off those big, black-rimmed glasses, and said," I don't have the resources to lend you, but I'll find a way. Let’s spin the guitar ”. It is recorded here the revelation which will be worth the eternal hatred of the sharp canine monetarists who hate the physical economy. (…) San Tiago had money printed.

== Economic fundamentals ==
Tubarão became the bridge that linked Vale S.A. to the rest of the world and enabled the company to significantly increase overall Brazilian exports.

Designed to accommodate ships of a size that was not yet manufactured, the port of Tubarão was a world pioneer in its category.

It was crazy for the time, because there was no 'ship design' or steel for this size of ship, 'says Eliezer. Despite the enormous risk involved, Japan agreed to build the ships. It was a marriage of interests.

== Collateral benefits ==
The inauguration of the port of Tubarão in 1966 and its pioneering technology aroused great enthusiasm among Japanese investors and did much to elevate the international concept of Brazil.

Its construction immediately attracted a veritable "flood" of new foreign investments to Brazil, such as Celulose Nipo Brasileira SA- Cenibra, Companhia Siderúrgica de Tubarão, Albrás - Alunorte (alumina and aluminum), Mineração da Serra Geral (iron ore) and Nova Era Silicon (ferrosilicon alloys, etc.) and the first major overseas project CSI (California Steel Industries / Joint Venture from Vale with Kawasaki), which somehow helped absolve the finance minister of the 'time, San Tiago Dantas, of the "sin" of having authorized the printing of money for its creation.

== Present ==
In 2016, the port was responsible for 13% of Espírito Santo's GDP. The increase in economic activity in the state can also be explained, because after the construction of the port and the complex, it influenced the arrival of companies such as Aracruz Celulose (now Suzano Papel e Celulose) and Companhia Siderúrgica de Tubarão (now ArcelorMittal). The Vitória Industrial Center (CIVIT), in Serra, also took place after 1966. The Tubarão complex includes eight pelletizing factories, port operations for the shipment of iron ore, pellets, agricultural products. and the unloading of coal. At least 60 types of products pass through the site, including iron ore, steel, soybeans, coal and limestone along 905 kilometers of railroad, which accounts for around 40% of the rail freight of the country.

== Transport ==
Road access is via the BR-101, the railroad, through the Vitória-Minas Railway - EFVMe or the maritime through the access channel to the terminal, in the open sea, in the city of Vitória - ES.
