= Companhia Siderúrgica Nacional =

Brazilian steelmaker

Companhia Siderúrgica Nacional SA
- Type: S.A. (corporation)
- Traded as: B3: CSNA3; NYSE: SID; Ibovespa Component
- Industry: Iron and steel
- Founded: 9 April 1941; 85 years ago
- Headquarters: São Paulo, Brazil
- Key people: Benjamin Steinbruch, (Chairman & CEO)
- Products: Steel; Iron; Metallurgy; Mining; Cement; Logistics; Power station
- Revenue: ▲US$ 6.0 billion (2018)
- Net income: ▲US$ 1.3 billion (2017 8)
- Number of employees: 19,000
- Subsidiaries: List: CSN Siderurgia; Unidades Fabris (CSN); Usina Presidente Vargas; CSN Paraná; CSN Galvasud; Exterior; Stahlwerk Thüringen (SWT); Lusosider S.A. CSN Mineração (87,52%); Casa de Pedra; Arcos CSN Energia; Hydroelectric power station; Usina Hidrelétrica de Itá; Usina Hidrelétrica de Igarapava; Usina Presidente Vargas; Central Termelétrica; Turbina de Topo CSN Cimento; Usina Presidente Vargas; Arcos CSN Logística; MRS Logística (37,2%); FTL (96,42%); TLSA (46,30); Porto de Itaguaí; Tecar; Sepetiba Tecon; Prada Distribuição Outhers; ERSA; CBSI (50%)
- Website: www.csn.com.br

Companhia Siderúrgica Nacional (CSN) lit. 'National Siderurgy Company' or 'National Steel Company' is the largest fully integrated steel producer in Brazil and one of the largest in Latin America in terms of crude steel production. Its main plant is located in the city of Volta Redonda, in the state of Rio de Janeiro. Its current CEO is Benjamin Steinbruch.

Companhia Siderúrgica Nacional's annual crude steel capacity and rolled product capacity are 5.6 million and 5.1 million tons, respectively. It produces a broad line of steel products, including slabs, hot- and cold-rolled, galvanized and tin mill products. Its products are used by the distribution, packaging, automotive, home appliance and construction industries.

CSN accounted for approximately 49% of the galvanized steel products sold in Brazil. In 2004, it accounted for approximately 98% of the tin mill products sold in Brazil. It is one of the world's leading producers of tin mill products. CSN also owns its own source of iron ore.

== History ==
=== Foundation and expansion (1941–1980) ===
Construction of Companhia Siderúrgica Nacional (CSN) in 1941.

Inauguration by President Eurico Gaspar Dutra of Companhia Siderúrgica Nacional (CSN) in 1946.

Companhia Siderúrgica Nacional was created as a state-owned company on April 9, 1941, during the "Estado Novo era", during the term of Brazilian president, Getúlio Vargas, after an agreement between the American and the Brazilian governments (see the Washington Accords) for the construction of a facility that would provide steel for the Allies during the Second World War and later be an aid for Brazil's development. It began its operations in 1946, under Eurico Gaspar Dutra's presidency.

CSN was a Brazilian corporation incorporated in 1941 pursuant to a decree of Brazilian President Getúlio Vargas. The Presidente Vargas Steelworks, located at Volta Redonda, in Rio de Janeiro State, started production in 1946. It initially produced coke, pig iron castings and long products. Two major expansions were undertaken at the Presidente Vargas Steelworks during the 1970s. The first, completed in 1974, increased installed annual production capacity to 1.6 million tons of crude steel. The second, completed in 1977, raised capacity to 2.4 million tons of crude steel.

=== 1980–2005 ===
CSN underwent another expansion in 1989, increasing capacity to 4.5 million tons of crude steel. The company was privatized through a series of auctions held in 1993 and early 1994, through which the Brazilian government sold its 91% interest in the company.

In 1993, CSN adopted a capital improvement program, which was revised and extended in 1995. The goals were: an increase in annual production of crude steel; improvement in productivity, increase in the quality of the products, and enhancement of the environmental protection and cleanup programs. Since February 1996, all production has been based on the continuous casting process, rather than ingot casting, an alternative method that resulted in lower energy use and metal loss. From 1996 through 2002, CSN spent the equivalent of US$2.4 billion under the capital improvement program and for operational capacity maintenance, culminating with the revamping in 2001 of Blast Furnace #3 and Hot Strip Mill #2 at the Presidente Vargas Steelworks increasing annual production capacity to 5.6 million tons of crude steel and 5.1 million tons of rolled products, from approximately 5.0 million tons in each case.

In 2005 reinforced its position as the largest iron-mining operation in the country, through a controlling stake in Companhia Vale do Rio Doce (CVRD).

In January 2004, the CSN board announced the approval of investments up to US$820 million to be made through 2007, including: expansion of production at the Casa de Pedra iron ore mine from 15.5 to approximately 40 million tons; expansion of the coal terminal adjacent to the Sepetiba Port facilities to enable annual exports of up to 30 million tons of iron ore; and the construction of a six million-ton pellet plant. The company also explored opportunities for acquisitions or mergers abroad in order to expand output, and proposed to build a new steel plant which would have doubled current annual production of 5.8 million tons of raw steel, at an estimated investment cost of US$2.6 billion. Seeking to maintain focus on its program of acquisitions and growth, CSN set aside $520 million for investments in 2005.

=== Privatization (1993–present) ===
In 1993 the company was privatized by Itamar Franco's government, during the National Program for Privatization led by the federal government, started by Fernando Collor and continued by Franco.

Its main factories were located in Volta Redonda, at the Vale do Paraíba region, southern Rio de Janeiro state, and its iron mines at Congonhas and Arcos, both of them cities in the Minas Gerais state, and the coal mines at Siderópolis, Santa Catarina state.

During almost 50 years of state control, the Brazilian flat steel sector was coordinated on a national basis under the auspices of Siderbrás, the national steel monopoly. The state had far less involvement in the non-flat steel sector, which has traditionally been made up of smaller private sector companies. The larger integrated flat steel producers operated as semiautonomous companies under the control of Siderbrás and were individually privatized during 1991 to 1993.

==== Proposed merger-acquisition with Corus ====
In 2006 CSN made a rival bid to acquire the Anglo-Dutch steel firm Corus, following an announcement the acquisition of Corus by Tata Steel of India for $8.1 billion (£4.5 billion, or £4.55 per share). Competitive bidding between the two companies raised the final price to £6.08 per share in 2007, with Tata outbidding CSN.

CSN and Corus had earlier been partners in a Portuguese venture until early this year, when Corus sold its stake to CSN.

== Production ==
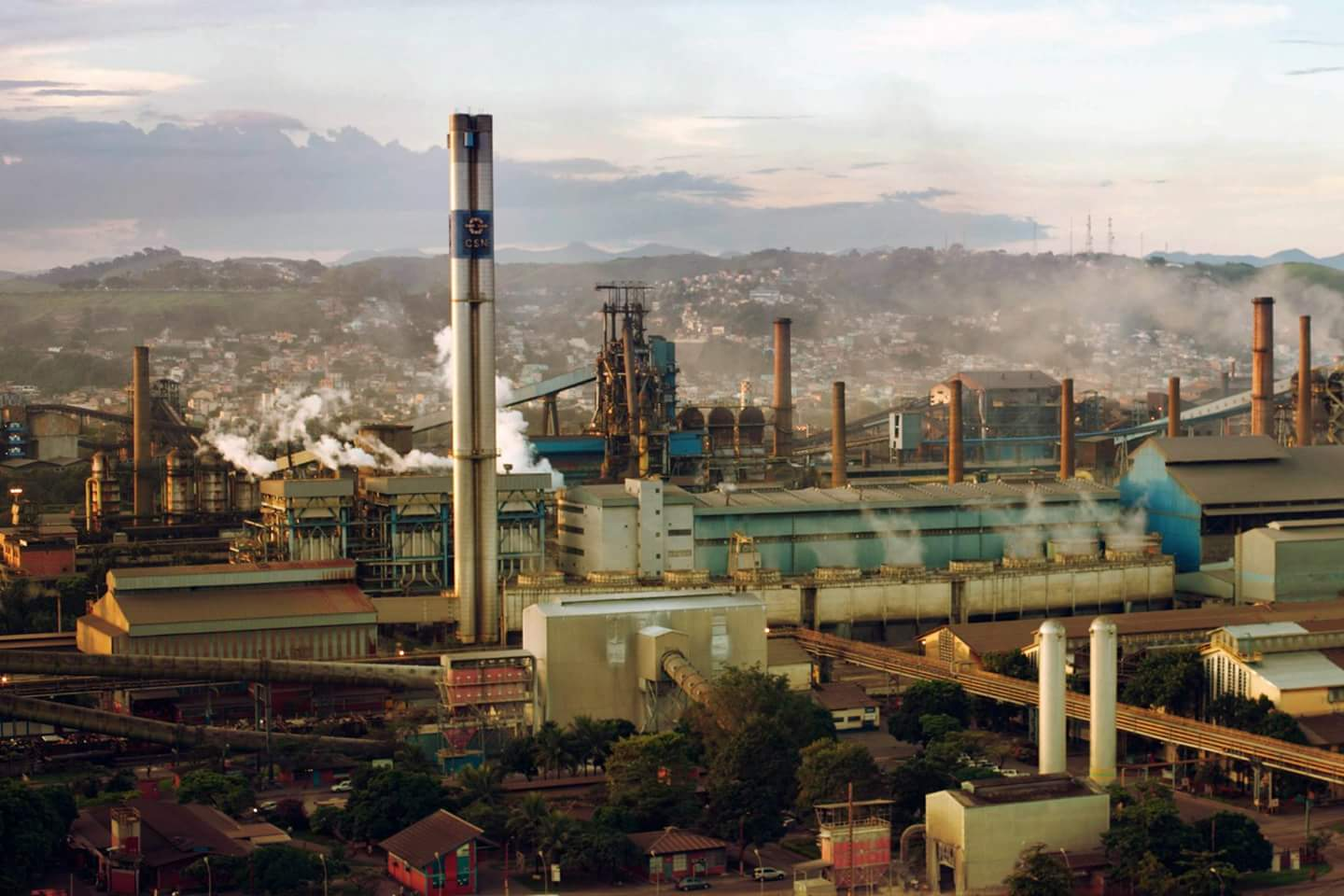
Panoramic view of the Companhia Siderúrgica Nacional, in the Center of the city of Volta Redonda, Rio de Janeiro, Brazil

CSN primarily operates as an integrated steel producer in Brazil. It produces a line of steel products, including slabs, which are semi-finished products used for processing hot-rolled, cold-rolled, or coated coils and sheet products; hot-rolled products comprising heavy-gauge hot-rolled coils and sheets, and light-gauge hot-rolled coils and sheets; cold-rolled products, including cold-rolled coils and sheets; and galvanized products consisting of flat-rolled steel coated with zinc or a zinc-based alloy. The company also offers tin mill products, including tin plate, tin free steel, low tin coated steel, and black plate products. CSN also mines iron ore, limestone, and dolomite, and maintains strategic investments in railroads and power supply companies. The company sells its steel products to customers in Brazil and 71 other countries in North America, Europe, and Asia through its sales force and distributors. It is considered one of the most productive steel-makers in the world, producing more than 6 million tons of raw steel and more than 5 million tons of laminates per year.

== Holdings ==
CSN owns different firms, such as GalvaSud (in Porto Real, Rio de Janeiro), Inal (in Mogi das Cruzes, São Paulo and Barra Mansa, Rio de Janeiro), CSN PARANÁ (in Araucária, Paraná) and container (TECON) and coal (TECAR) terminals in the Itaguaí port (in Itaguaí, Rio de Janeiro). It also has control through shareholding in the railways MRS Logística, and the Companhia Ferroviária do Nordeste (CFN), in hydroelectric dams at Igarapava and Itá, and in factories in the United States and Portugal.

== Domestic government policies ==
=== Anti-dumping, Countervailing Duties, Safeguards and Government Protectionism ===
Protectionist measures adopted by the governments in some of CSN's main markets could adversely affect crucial export sales. In response to the increased production and exports of steel in many countries, anti-dumping, countervailing duties and safeguard measures have been imposed by countries which represent some of the main markets for CSN exports. Those, and similar, measures could provoke an imbalance in the international steel market, which could adversely affect CSN's exports.

=== Potential Costs of Environmental Compliance; Mining Regulation ===
New environmental standards imposed on CSN may require capital expenditures that do not increase productivity. CSN's steel-making facilities are subject to a broad range of laws, regulations and permit requirements in Brazil relating to the protection of human health and the environment.

=== Dependence on Water Source ===
Large amounts of water are required in the production of steel. CSN's principal source of water is the Paraíba do Sul river, which runs through the city of Volta Redonda. Much of the water is recirculated, and some, after processing, is returned to the Paraíba do Sul river. A law passed in 1997 permits the Brazilian government to charge for water usage from water courses.

Brazilian government policies in the energy sector may have an adverse impact on the cost or supply of electricity for CSN aluminum-related and ferroalloy operations.

Tax and Social Security Reforms May Affect the Brazilian Economy, and May Impose a Higher Tax Burden on CSN.

The Brazilian Federal Congress has recently amended the Brazilian Constitution to modify certain aspects of the social security and tax system. Moreover, the Brazilian Federal Congress is currently reviewing additional bills which would introduce further changes to Brazil's tax and social security laws. Such reforms may affect Brazilian economic conditions generally, and may impose a higher tax burden on CSN. If CSN is not able to pass the cost of such potential higher tax and social security burdens to customers, their profit margins may be adversely affected.

=== Mining Concessions ===
CSN mining operations are governed by the Brazilian Constitution and the Mining Code and are subject to the laws, rules and regulations promulgated pursuant to the Constitution and the Code. Under the Brazilian Constitution, all mineral resources belong to Brazil. CSN mining activities at the Casa de Pedra mine are based on holding of a Manifesto de Mina, which gives them full ownership over the mineral deposits existing within their property limits. CSN mining activities at the Bocaina mine are based on a concession which gives them the right to mine for as long as ore reserves exist.

=== Fluctuation of the Real Exchange Controls ===
Fluctuation in the exchange rate of the real can adversely affect CSN earnings. Historically, emerging markets, including Brazil, have experienced devaluation of their currency at various times. In 2002, the Brazilian exchange rate fluctuated from a low of R$2.2709 per US$1.00 to a high of R$3.9552 per US$1.00. On June 6, 2005, the rate was R$2.4576 per US$1.00. The real depreciated against the U.S. dollar approximately 2.3% in 2002, due in part to the continued economic and political uncertainties in Brazil and other emerging markets and the global economic slowdown. In 2003 and 2004, the real appreciated 18.2% and 8.1%, respectively, against the U.S. dollar. In the first quarter of 2005 the real depreciated 1% against the U.S. dollar. Further fluctuations in the Brazilian currency, in relation to the U.S. dollar or other currencies, may have an adverse effect on CSN's financial condition and results, increasing the cost in reals of CSN's foreign currency denominated borrowings and imports of raw materials, particularly coal and coke.

=== Inflation and Interest Rate Risks ===
High inflation rates have in the past had negative effects on the Brazilian economy and CSN's business. During 2002, the Central Bank raised Brazil's base interest rate by a total of 7.5% to 26.5% as a result of the growing economic crisis in Argentina, one of Brazil's primary trading partners, the lower level of growth of the U.S. economy and the economic uncertainty caused by the Brazilian presidential elections, among other factors. During 2003, the Central Bank decreased Brazil's interest rate from 26.5% to 16.5%, reflecting the good momentum and inflation stability in line with the Central Bank's inflation target. During 2004, the Central Bank increased Brazil's base interest rate by 1.25% to 17.75%, on concerns that growth in Brazil's gross domestic product could jeopardize the inflation target.

== Competition ==
The main competition of CSN in Brazil are Arcelor Brazil, Metallurgica Gerdau, Companhia Siderúrgica Paulista (COSIPA), Usiminas and CST-Brazil.

== See also ==
- 1988 CSN strike
