= Canico Resource =

Canadian junior resource company

Canico Resource Corp. is a Vancouver, British Columbia-based junior resource company focused on the development of the Onça-Puma nickel laterite project located in Para State, Brazil. This is a large, high-grade, open-pittable deposit which is one of the world's best undeveloped nickel projects.

According to the feasibility studies, the plant will have a nominal capacity to produce 57,000 tons of nickel annually, and its development will demand investments of US$1.1 billion. Production startup of the first module was scheduled for 2008.

The company was founded in 2004 and was headquartered in Toronto, Ontario, Canada. Canico Resource was known for its operations at the Serra dos Carajas mine in Brazil, which was one of the largest iron ore mines in the world. The company was also involved in the exploration and development of other mineral resources in Brazil and other countries in South America.

Canico Resource was acquired by Companhia Vale do Rio Doce (CVRD) in December 2005. CVRD, a Brazilian company, headquartered in the city of Rio de Janeiro, Brazil, is the largest metals and mining company in the Americas and one of the largest in the global metals and mining industry.
