= RFFSA =

Brazilian railway company

- Trade name: Rede Ferroviária Federal S.A.
- Company type: State-owned enterprise
- Industry: Rail transport
- Genre: Sociedade anônima
- Founded: March 16, 1957
- Defunct: December 7, 1999
- Fate: Extinct
- Successors: CPTM, SuperVia, CBTU, MRS Logística and others
- Headquarters: Rio de Janeiro, Brazil
- Area served: South Region, Southeast Region, Central-West Region, Northeast Region
- Products: Passenger and cargo transportation
- Owner: Federal government of Brazil

The Rede Ferroviária Federal, Sociedade Anônima (RFFSA, pronounced as Refesa) (lit. 'Federal Railroad Network, S.A.') was the State-owned national railway company of Brazil created from Brazilian Federal Law #3.115 on March 16, 1957, after several railroads were nationalized by the Brazilian government. However, the railroad did not take full effect until September 30, 1957. The RFFSA linked 42 railways together (both on documents and actual railroads), creating a regional system composed of 22 railroads. The goal of the RFFSA was to promote and advance the railroad sector of Brazil, creating a north-south-east-west rail network in all five regions of Brazil. But it failed and the RFFSA only served four of the five regions with a north-south rail network win 19 units of the federation of Brazil. By 1999, freight service of the railroad was liquidated and privatized, with the passenger service of the railroad liquidations occurring in 2007.

== Federal Authority ==
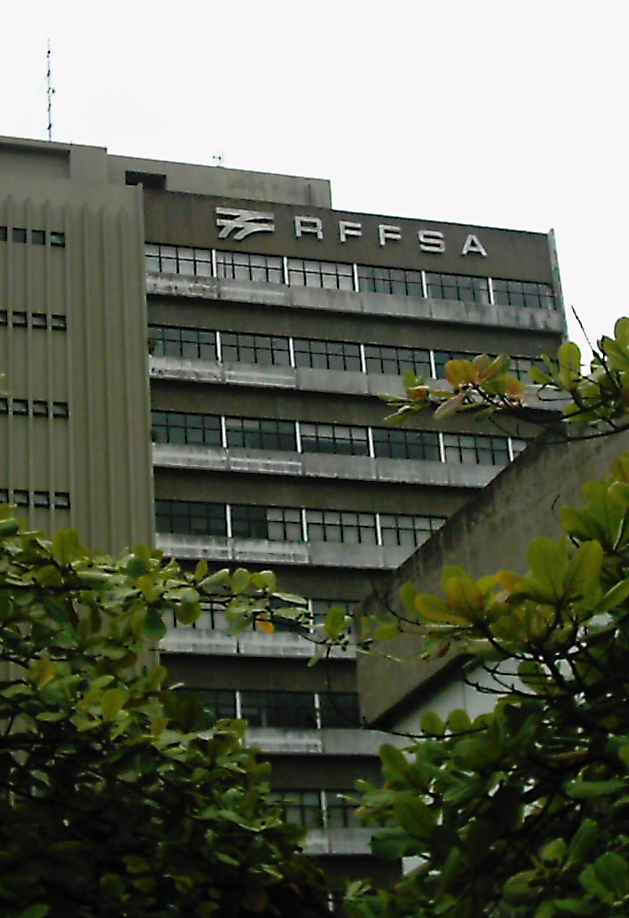
The former headquarters of the RFFSA in Juiz de Fora.

According to Article 7 of Law #3.115 which created the RFFSA, the company was given the following powers for the operation of the railroads:

- The company must manage, operate, maintain, refurbish, expand, improve and maintain traffic on the railways it built.
- Introduce (at face value) bearer bonds of its own issue or the issue of the companies that will be organized with a limit of two for paid-in capital, with or without a guarantee from the Treasury.
- Subscription of capital from companies under its control and the consent to grant them loans or guarantees.
- Organize and supervise the management of the companies under its control, as well as its methods and procedures for operation under contract to provide services to guarantee these companies technical assistance, accounting, legal, and administrative services.
- Propose revisions and modifications of tariffs, as necessary, to the Departamento Nacional de Estradas de Ferro who would review the proposals and submit the final approval to the Ministro da Viação e Obras Públicas.
- Create a business plan and approve the budgets of the companies under its control, monitoring their respective operations.
- Restructure staffing quarters of personnel according to the needs of service and regional standards of living set on a fixed number in the companies’ organization, remuneration, rights and duties.
- Conduct all the works of studies and construction of railroads which have been approved by the União for which they are provided resources.

The following powers were given to the RFFSA from Law #6.171 in 1974

- Monitor the railway services throughout the country.
- Promote a coordination of studies and tariff costs for general rail transport.
- Create a unification and standardization of the Brazilian Railway System.
- Promote a qualitative and quantitative evaluation of the national railway system.
- Conduct research relating to the improvement of rail activities in the country.
- Enforce the railway into the Plano Nacional de Viação.

== Unification of Railways ==
The twenty-two railways that composed the RFFSA were mostly nationalized by the Brazilian government which chose to merge them administratively.

The following railways were:

- Estrada de Ferro Madeira-Mamoré
- Estrada de Ferro de Bragança
- Estrada de Ferro São Luís-Teresina
- Estrada de Ferro Central do Piauí
- Rede de Viação Cearense
- Estrada de Ferro Mossoró-Sousa
- Estrada de Ferro Sampaio Correia
- Rede Ferroviária do Nordeste
- Viação Férrea Federal do Leste Brasileiro
- Estrada de Ferro Bahia-Minas
- Estrada de Ferro Leopoldina
- Estrada de Ferro Central do Brasil
- Rede Mineira de Viação
- Estrada de Ferro Goiás
- Estrada de Ferro Santos a Jundiaí
- Estrada de Ferro Noroeste do Brasil
- Rede de Viação Paraná-Santa Catarina
- Estrada de Ferro Dona Teresa Cristina

The following railroads were later merged into the RFFSA:

- Estrada de Ferro Ilhéus (added in 1959 after a two-year legal battle between the English owners and the Government of Brazil)
- Estrada de Ferro Nazaré (added in 1968 for unknown circumstances even though the railroad was already out of service)
- Estrada de Ferro Santa Catarina and the Viação Férrea do Rio Grande do Sul (pt:Viação Férrea do Rio Grande do Sul) (originally leased to the RFFSA, later merged into the RFFSA)
- Estrada de Ferro Tocantins (remained under a special regime until 1974, when it was abolished; the railroad was merged away into the RFFSA that same year)

== Privatisation and liquidation ==
Privatization was one of the alternatives for investments to return in railroads. The government of the PSDB gave the public rail lines access to transport cargo. However, most of the railroad companies were not interested in seeing a transport of passengers, as the service was nearly extinct.

Between 1996 and 1998, over 22,000 km of rail lines in Brazil (73% of the entire state rail system) were being transferred to various private organizations, which signed 30-year concessions to operate the railroad systems. The organized private railroad companies will invest $2.1 billion within the 30-year concession as well as increase the volume of traffic, modernize, and expand their railroad systems.

The main goal of privatizing the RFFSA and FEPASA was to end the financial and labor troubles of the railroads, mainly due to a lack of investment by Brazil from the 1980s and the 1990s.

On December 9, 1999, the liquidation of the Ferrovia Paulista S.A. (FEPASA) began as a merger to the RFFSA, and then as an auction in the form of a concession for 20 years. Ferroban was the winner, which has an option to renew the 20-year concession. However, the control was split between América Latina Logística and Brasil Ferrovias.

On December 17, 1999, the liquidation of the RFFSA began by the General Meeting of Shareholders. By May 31, 2007, the liquidation was complete, becoming Brazilian Federal Law #11.483.

== Paint schemes ==
From the first appearance of diesel locomotives in 1957 to the adoption of the SIGO System in 1983, the standard colors of the RFFSA were Cadmium Red accented with two Lemon yellow stripes and black undercarriage. Depending on the RFFSA subsidiary that existed, the lower stripe was widened to accommodate the subsidiary's reporting marks. From 1983 until 1996, the RFFSA removed all subsidiary markings and applied the locomotive's number in the same position.

In 1993, the RFFSA held a contest celebrating the presence of diesel traction in Brazil. This contest created a new paint scheme for its locomotives in recognition of the development of Brazil's railway system from the use of diesel locomotives. Held at the D. Pedro II Railway Station in Rio de Janeiro, the contest became a rail festival as it was open to the public with a plethora of support from various sectors of the RFFSA, professional associations, and the railroad's customers.

To participate in this contest, the only requirement was a display board showcasing the new paint scheme design by the participant. The locomotive model chosen as the template for the new paint scheme design was an EVISA GT22CUM-1. When the winning design was selected from the contest, an actual GT22CUM-1 would receive the paint scheme.

On December 6, 1993, Paulo H. S. Cavalieri from Juiz de Fora was declared the winner of the new paint scheme out of 97 participants. Cavalieri was not the first-place winner but was third. RFFSA President Renato Almeida chose Cavalieri's Ash Grey and Lemon Yellow design based on the factors of a good way to promote the company systemwide and the simplicity of cost saving graphics/paint for easy application.

Shortly before an actual GT22CUM-1 was to receive the new paint scheme, the RFFSA management did a final adjustment to the design where a large RFFSA logo was to be applied along the locomotive's carbody instead of Cavlieri's fading strokes version.

On March 2, 1994, EVISA GT22CUM-1 #4605-4L emerged from the workshops of Ponta Grossa with Cavalieri's modified scheme. The locomotive was named Curitiba in honor of the city where the new paint scheme was put into effect on March 1, 1994. Shortly after the 4605-4L was released, any locomotive scheduled for maintenance was to receive the new scheme. Depending on various reasons from the workshops, the locomotives are permitted to be named.

With the paint scheme known to railfans as "Fase II", it was short lived from 1993 to 1996. Although visibility increased from far distances with the yellow, it was flawed with easily becoming dirty after a few months. By late 1995 and into 1996, the RFFSA was heavily in debt to clean or paint a locomotive that most of the grime left the locomotives black.

In contrast to Cavalieri's scheme being selected, the actual winner who won first but was not the selected scheme was Eike Pereira de Souza, an architect from the Department of Auto Graphics of the RFFSA. He won a cash prize of 200,000 Cruzeiros.

== The SIGO System ==
The SIGO was a system implemented in 1983 to standardize the numbering system of railway vehicles in Brazil. Each piece of rolling stock is allocated a six-digit number, a check digit, and a letter to indicate its allocation. When the RFFSA began to repaint its locomotives of both Metric and Irish Gauges in Ash Grey and Lemon Yellow (1994–1996), the numbers were relocated towards the radiator section of the locomotive. In some cases, the locomotives were baptized with names, municipalities, states, or cities of there they respectively operated.

With locomotives, the first two digits are hidden, and used only on documents, e.g. 905212-7F.

- '90' represents: RFFSA locomotive (only written in documents).
- '5212' is the roadnumber of the locomotive.
- '-7' is the check digit.
- 'F' is the letter code for where the locomotive is located (The 'F' indicates: Juiz de Fora - Sector SR-3).

Number Series	Type of Locomotive
0001–0100	Steam locomotives – 760 mm (2 ft 5 15/16 in) gauge
0101–0400	Steam locomotives – 1,000 mm (3 ft 3 3/8 in) metre gauge
0401–0500	Steam locomotives – 1,600 mm (5 ft 3 in) broad gauge
0401–0500	Diesel locomotives – 1,000 mm
0751–1000	Diesel locomotives – 1,600 mm
2001–3000	GE diesel locomotives – 1,000 mm
3001–4000	GE diesel locomotives – 1,600 mm
4001–5000	GM diesel locomotives – 1,000 mm
5001–6000	GM diesel locomotives – 1,600 mm
6001–7000	Alco diesel locomotives – 1,000 mm
7001–8000	Alco diesel locomotives – 1,600 mm
8001–9000	Electric locomotives – 1,000 mm
9001–9999	Electric locomotives – 1,600 mm

== Locomotives ==
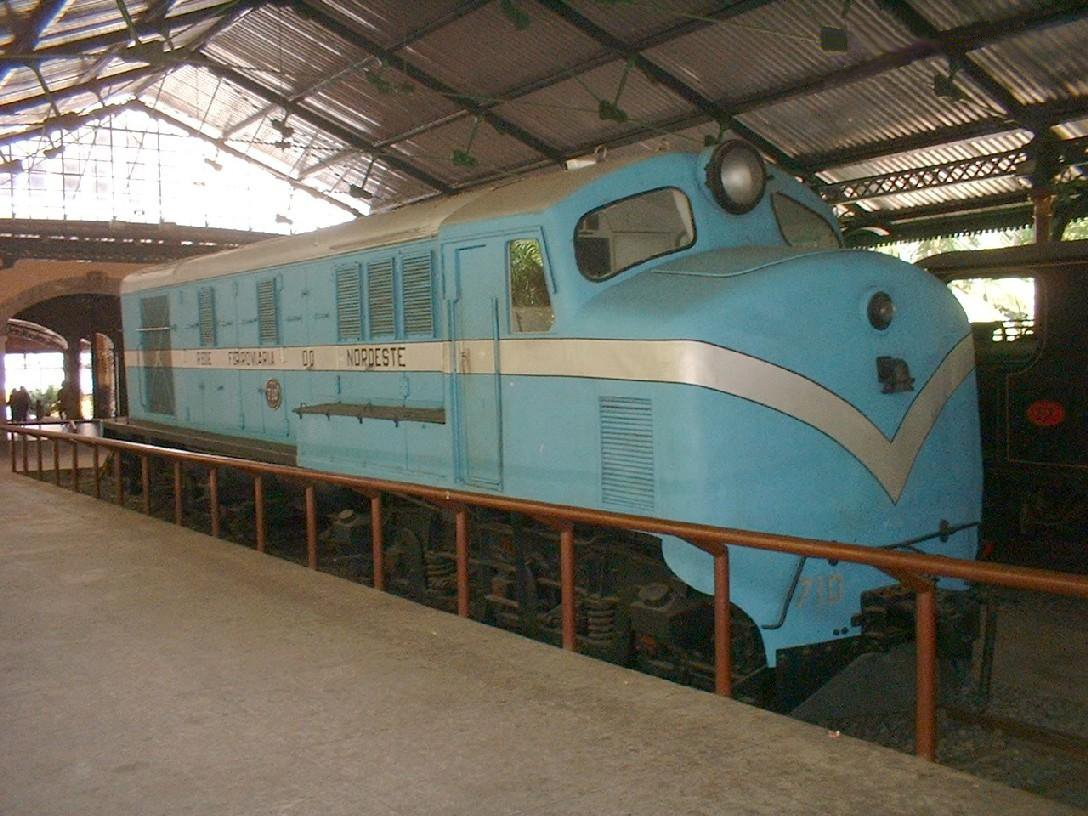
Diesel-electric locomotive built in 1953 by English Electric in England for the Rede Ferroviária do Nordeste. Operated until the 1980s.

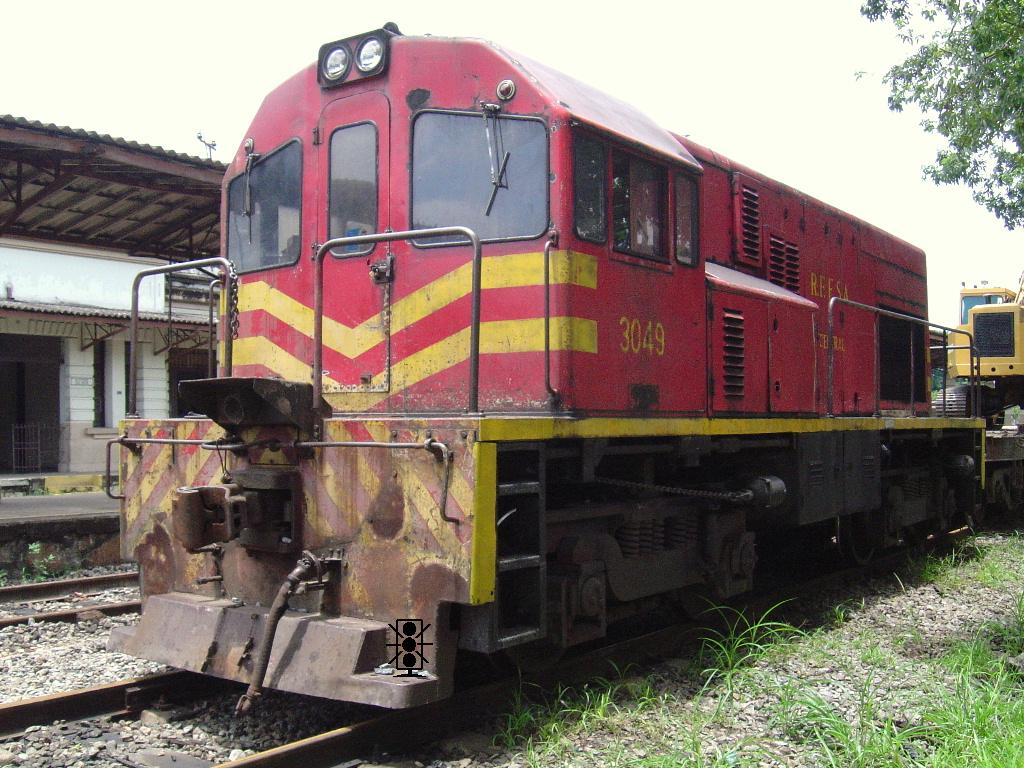
RFFSA GE U6B #3049.

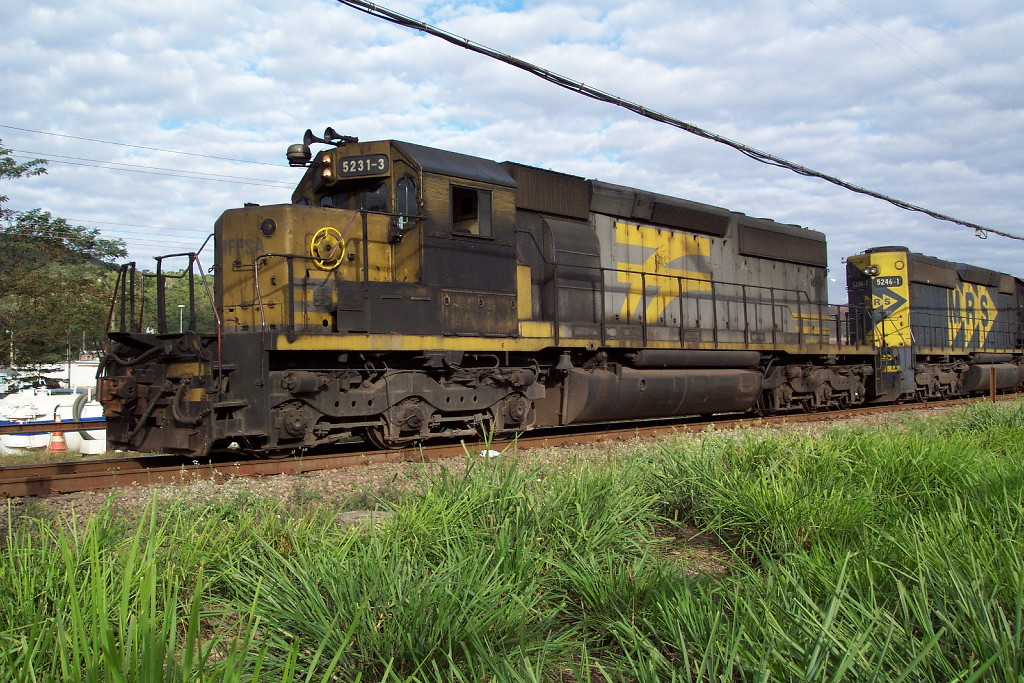
RFFSA MACOSA SD40-2 #5231-3F. Baptized with the name 'Aparecida do Norte'

== Present day Brazilian railway companies ==
Metropolitan transit

- Compania Brasileira de Trens Urbanos -- CBTU – controlled by Ministry of Cities and Ministry of Transports – gauges: 1,600 mm (5 ft 3 in) - commuter metropolitan services operating in Belo Horizonte, Recife, João Pessoa, Natal and Maceió Cities
- Companhia Paulista de Trens Metropolitanos – CPTM – commuter services in São Paulo city and suburbs; controlled by the state of São Paulo – gauges: 1,600 mm (5 ft 3 in), on the two former Sorocabana lines 1,000 mm (3 ft 3 3/8 in)
- Concessionária de Transporte Ferroviário S.A. – SuperVia – commuter services in Rio de Janeiro city and suburbs – gauges: 1,600 mm (5 ft 3 in), on the former Estrada de Ferro Leopoldina 1,000 mm (3 ft 3 3/8 in)
- Empresa de Trens Urbanos de Porto Alegre – TRENSURB – commuter services in Porto Alegre, RS and suburbs – gauge: 1,600 mm (5 ft 3 in)

Freight services

- América Latina Logística S.A. – ALL (former Ferrovia Sul Atlântico (FSA)) – gauge: 1,000 mm (3 ft 3 3/8 in)
- Companhia Ferroviária do Nordeste – CFN – controlled by Transnordestina Logística S.A. – gauge: 1,000 mm (3 ft 3 3/8 in)
- Estrada de Ferro do Amapá – from 1953 to 2006 controlled by Empresa Indústria e Comércio de Minério S.A. (ICOMI), since then by MMX Mineração e Metálicos S.A. (MMX); this is one of two Brazilian railways with 1,435 mm (4 ft 8 1/2 in) gauge, the other being Line 5 of São Paulo Metro.
- Estrada de Ferro Carajás – EFC – controlled by Companhia Vale do Rio Doce (CVRD) – gauge: 1,600 mm (5 ft 3 in)
- Estrada de Ferro Campos do Jordão – EFCJ – controlled by the department of tourism of the state of São Paulo – gauge: 1,000 mm (3 ft 3 3/8 in)
- Estrada de Ferro Jari – EFJ – gauge: 1,600 mm (5 ft 3 in)
- Estrada de Ferro Trombetas – EFT – controlled by Mineiração Rio do Norte – gauge: 1,000 mm (3 ft 3 3/8 in)
- Estrada de Ferro Vitória a Minas – EFVM – controlled by Companhia Vale do Rio Doce (CVRD) – gauge: 1,000 mm (3 ft 3 3/8 in)
- Ferrovia Centro-Atlântica S.A. – FCA – controlled by Companhia Vale do Rio Doce (CVRD) – gauge: 1,000 mm (3 ft 3 3/8 in)
- Ferrovia Norte-Sul – FNS – controlled by Companhia Vale do Rio Doce (CVRD) – gauge: 1,600 mm (5 ft 3 in)
- Ferrovias Bandeirantes – FERROBAN – formerly controlled by Brasil Ferrovias, then incorporated by ALL (Sorocabana network) and FCA (Mogiana network) – gauges: 1,000 mm (3 ft 3 3/8 in) (Mogiana and Sorocabana networks) and 1,600 mm (5 ft 3 in) (Paulista and Araraquarense networks)
- Ferrovia Norte Brasil – FERRONORTE – formerly controlled by Brasil Ferrovias, then incorporated by ALL – gauge: 1,600 mm (5 ft 3 in)
- Ferrovia Novoeste S.A. – NOVOESTE – formerly controlled by Brasil Ferrovias, then incorporated by ALL – gauge: 1,000 mm (3 ft 3 3/8 in)
- Ferrovia Paraná Oeste – FERROPAR – also known as FERROESTE
- Ferrovia Teresa Cristina S.A. – FTC – gauge: 1,000 mm (3 ft 3 3/8 in)
- MRS Logística S.A. – MRS – gauge: 1,600 mm (5 ft 3 in)
- Tramway Bertioga – Itatinga – controlled by the state of São Paulo's port authority Companhia Docas do Estado de São Paulo (CODESP); more a local railway than an actual tramway – gauge: 800 mm (2 ft 7 1/2 in)

== Preservation Groups ==
- Associação Brasileira de Preservação Ferroviária - ABPF

== See also ==
- History of rail transport in Brazil
- Ferrovia Paulista S/A
- North-South Railway
