= Companhia Siderúrgica Paulista (Cosipa) =

Brazilian steel company

The Companhia Siderúrgica Paulista (Cosipa), which could be translated to the São Paulo Steel Company, also known as Usina José Bonifacio de Andrade e Silva, is a steel company located in locality of Cubatão on the São Paulo (state) coastline in Brazil. It covers 12 million square meters, including a bonded private port and has a capacity to operate 12 million tons / year, and a railway complex with capacity to serve 4 million tons / year. The company has about 5,500 employees, of whom 5,300 work in its Cubatão Mill.

The company produces non-coated flat steel (plates, heavy plates, hot-rolled and cold) that serve strategic sectors of the Brazilian economy, such as the automotive, railway, marine, construction, agricultural, packaging, mechanical, electronics, home appliances, machinery, equipment and distribution sectors.

== History ==
The Cosipa was founded in 1953, a dream of São Paulo entrepreneurs, among them Martinho Prado Uchoa, Plínio de Queiroz, Alcides da Costa Vidigal e Herbert Levi. After more than ten years of preparations and design, the plant was inaugurated on December 18, 1963, by President João Goulart. In 1966, it became an integrated coke steel mill. After two major expansion plans in the 1970s and 1980s with many problems arising from the recession and administrative shortcomings imposed by successive directors appointed by the Government, the Cosipa entered the 1990s with the most negative results among Brazilian steelmakers.

Since 1993, however, the Cosipa ceased to be a state enterprise. On August 20 in that year, the company was privatized through an auction on the State Stock Exchange of São Paulo—Bolsa de Valores do Estado de São Paulo (BOVESPA), and got to be controlled by a group of investors led by Usiminas. The privatization marked the beginning of a new era of goals and achievements.

The renewal of its industrial park, completed in 2001, enabled Cosipa to operate at maximum capacity, that is, to produce 4.5 million tonnes / year of liquid steel and could cope with their environmental problems. These two objectives were consolidated through a R $1.1 billion investment plan in the equipment of the Cubatao plant, of which R $240 million was only for environmental control equipment.

From mid-2005, after being formally integrated into the Usiminas System, it has shown a series of excellent financial results and other business indicators. Quite integrated into the community of Santos, one of the initial challenges in the post-privatization period for Cosipa was preparing to touch 5 million tons of annual liquid steel with a new Casting Machine 4, converter 7, Line Hot Rolling, the modernization of casting Machine Continuous 3 and the revamping of Blast Furnace 1.

In March 2009 it changed its name to Usiminas, in keeping with the other companies of the group.

In October 2015, in the context of the economic and financial crisis that hit Brazil, the closure of steel production activities was announced, causing thousands of layoffs and affecting the economy of the city of Cubatao and Santos region

== Fleet of locomotives ==
To undertake the movement of raw materials and finished products in an industrial complex shunting locomotives are used.
