= Carajás Mountains =

Brazilian mountain range

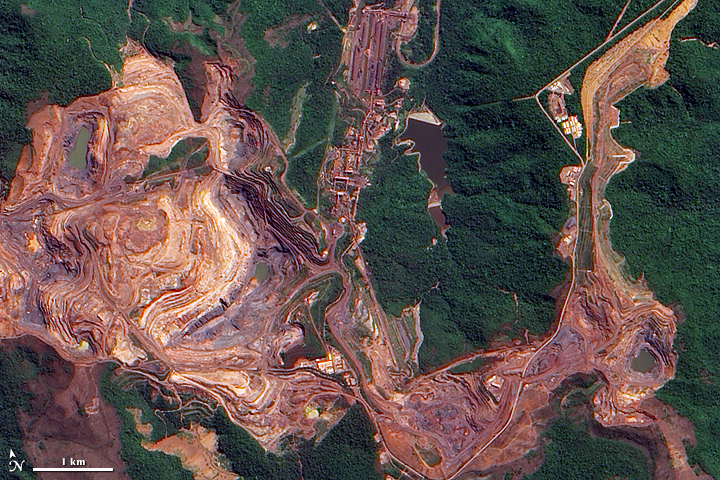

Highest point
- Peak: Monte Redenção
- Elevation: 716 m (2,349 ft)
- Coordinates: 6°16′37″S 50°34′54″W

Naming
- Native name: Serra dos Carajás (Portuguese)

Geography
- Country: Brazil
- Region: North
- Borders on: Carajás Mountains

The Carajás Mountains or Serra dos Carajás are a mountain range to the west of the municipality of Marabá in the Pará state of Brazil. Monte Redenção, Marabá's highest point, is located there.

The mountains are contained in the Carajás National Forest, a 411,949 hectares (1,017,950 acres) sustainable use conservation unit created in 1998 that includes mining operations in a huge deposit of high-grade iron ore.

== See also ==
- Carajás Mine
- S11D
