= Eliezer Batista =

Brazilian engineer and politician (1924–2018)

- Batista as Minister of Mines and Energy

President of Vale S.A.
- In office 1961–1964
- In office 1979–1986

Minister of Ministry of Mines and Energy
- In office 18 September 1962 – 20 October 1962

Personal details
- Born: Eliezer Batista da Silva; 4 May 1924 Nova Era, Minas Gerais, Brazil
- Died: 18 June 2018 (aged 94) Hospital Samaritano, Rio de Janeiro, Brazil
- Spouse: Jutta Fuhrken (m. 1954; div. 2009) Inguelore Scheunemann (m. 2009)
- Children: 7, including Eike
- Education: Federal University of Parana
- Occupation: Businessman; engineer; politician

Eliezer Batista da Silva (Brazilian Portuguese pronunciation: [eliˈɛzeɾ baˈtʃistɐ dɐ ˈsiwvɐ]; 4 May 1924 – 18 June 2018) was a Brazilian businessman, engineer and politician. In 1979, he was appointed president of Vale do Rio Doce, a multinational metals and mining corporation headquartered in Brazil, and within six years, increased the company's annual profits from $36 million to $920 million. Today, Vale S.A. is the largest producer of iron ore and nickel worldwide.

He was the father of former billionaire Eike Batista, once the richest man in Brazil. Batista served as Minister to the Ministry of Mines and Energy for one month in 1962.

== Early life and education ==
Batista was born 4 May 1924 in Nova Era, Minas Gerais, to José Batista da Silva and Maria da Natividade Pereira, both of whom were of Portuguese descent. He received a degree in civil engineering from the Federal University of Paraná in 1948.

== Personal life ==
Batista was married to Jutta Fuhrken, a native of Hamburg, Germany, with whom he had seven children, including Eike Batista. In 2009, he divorced her and subsequently remarried to Inguelore Scheunemann, a dentist and former professor and rectoress at the Federal University of Pelotas, also of German origin.
