= Canaã dos Carajás =

- Municipality
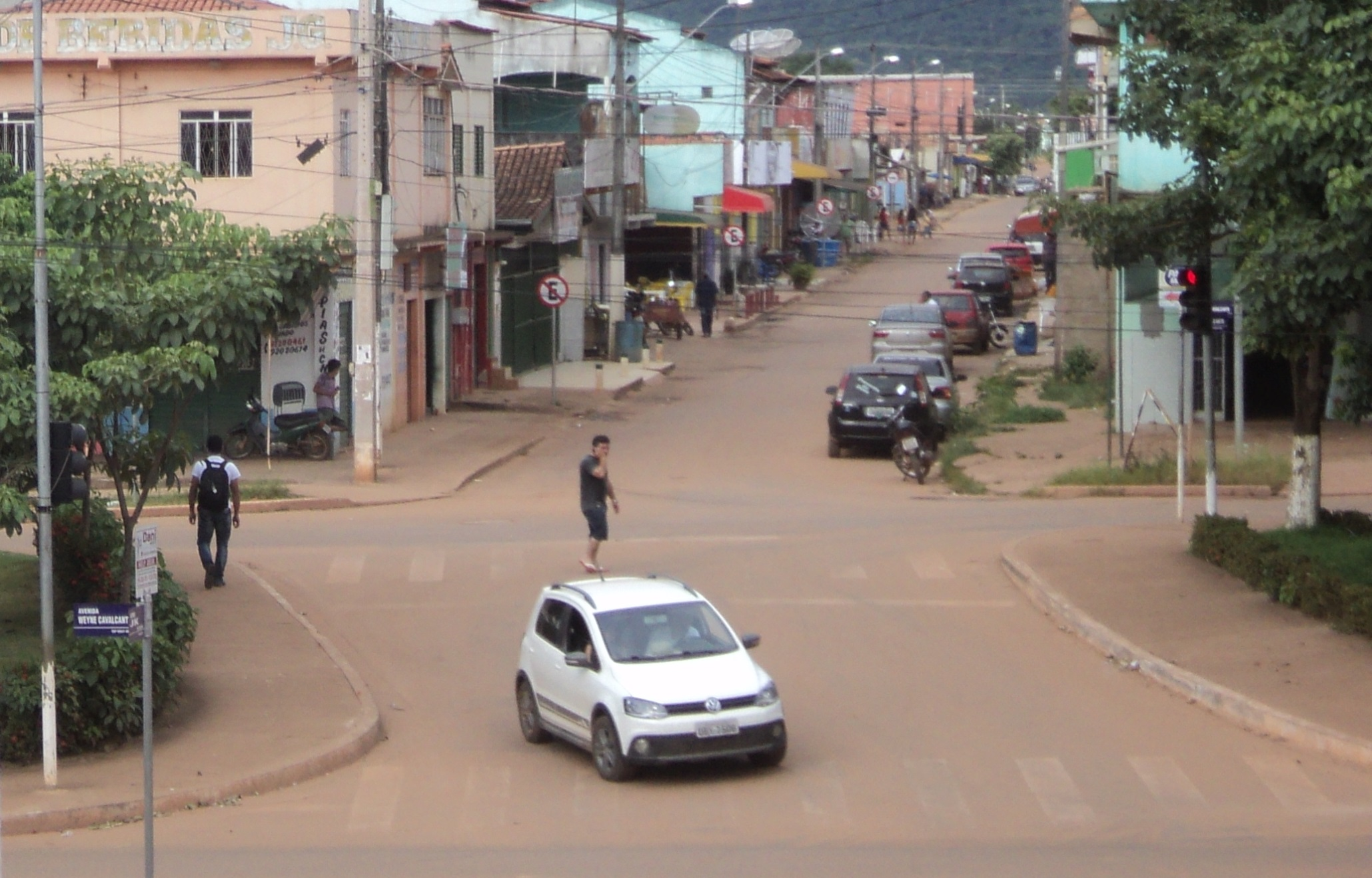

- Flag Coat of arms

- Location of Canaã dos Carajás in the State of Pará

- Location in Brazil
- Coordinates: 6°29′49″S 49°52′40″W
- Country: Brazil
- Region: Northern
- State: Pará
- Mesoregion: Sudeste Paraense

Government Mayor
  - Mayor: Josemira Raimunda Diniz Gadelha

Population (2020)
  - Total: 38,103
- Time zone: UTC−3 (BRT)
- Area code: 94
- Website: Official website

Canaã dos Carajás is a municipality in the state of Pará in the Northern region of Brazil.

The world's largest iron ore mining project, S11D, is being built nearby. The municipality contains 30% of the Carajás National Forest, a 411,949-hectare (1,017,950-acre) sustainable use conservation unit created in 1998 that includes mining operations in a huge deposit of high-grade iron ore.

== See also ==
- List of municipalities in Pará
