= Dona Teresa Cristina railway =

Estrada de Ferro Dona Teresa Cristina is an old railway in Santa Catarina, Southern Brazilian state.

== See also ==
- RFFSA
