= Vale S.A. =

Multinational diversified metals and mining corporation

Vale
- Type: Public
- Traded as: B3: VALE3; NYSE: VALE; BMAD: XVALO; Ibovespa Component
- Industry: Metals and Mining
- Founded: 1942
- Headquarters: Rio de Janeiro, Brazil
- Area served: Worldwide
- Key people: Gustavo Pimenta, CEO; Murilo Muller, CFO
- Products: Iron ore Iron ore pellets Manganese ore Ferroalloys; Copper; Nickel; Coal; Fertilizers
- Revenue: ▲US$ 38.4 billion (2025)
- Net income: ▼US$ 2.4 billion (2025)
- Number of employees: 213,413 (2021)
- Subsidiaries: Vale Canada; Vale Fertilizantes; Caemi (98,3%); Samarco (50%); VLI Multimodal S.A. (37,6%); MRS Logística (10,9%); Companhia Siderúrgica do Pecém (50%)
- Website: vale.com

Vale (Portuguese pronunciation: [ˈvali]), formerly Companhia Vale do Rio Doce (Doce River Valley Company), is a Brazilian multinational corporation engaged in metals and mining and one of the largest logistics operators in Brazil.

Vale is the largest producer of iron ore and nickel in the world. It also produces manganese, ferroalloys, copper, bauxite, potash, kaolin, and cobalt; as of 2014 the company operated nine hydroelectricity plants, and a large network of railroads, ships, and ports used to transport its products.

== Current operations ==
Although the company's primary operations are in Brazil, Vale has operations in 30 countries, which are detailed below and on the company's website.

=== Ownership structure ===
The company is listed on the stock exchanges of São Paulo, New York City, Jakarta, Paris and Madrid.

=== Mining business ===
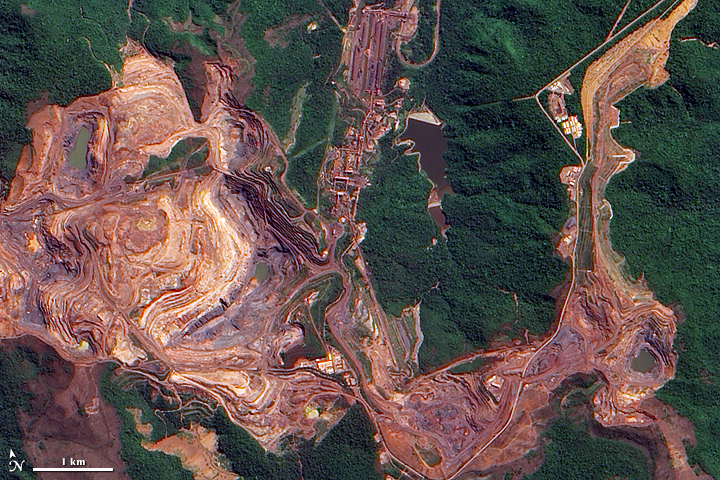
Vale's Carajás Iron Mine, Pará, 2009 NASA satellite photo

Iron ore: Vale is the world's largest iron ore producer. Sales of iron ore fines and pellets represented 65% of total company revenues in 2014. In 2014, Vale sold 256 million metric tonnes of iron ore fines and 44 million metric tonnes of iron ore pellets. Vale's Mariana Hub was the 9th largest iron ore mining center in the world in 2014, with an output of 39 million metric tonnes. Vale's Serra Sul / S11D is the largest mining reserve in the world. The company's iron ore mines are primarily in Brazil.

Nickel: Vale is the world's largest nickel producer. Sales of nickel represented 17% of total company revenues in 2014. In 2014, Vale sold 272,000 metric tonnes of nickel. The company owns nickel mines in Canada, Indonesia, New Caledonia and Brazil. Tesla is known to buy the majority of their nickel from Vale. In May 2022, Vale said that it had signed a long-term deal of supplying nickel for Tesla. The agreement involves supplying low-carbon Class 1 nickel which Tesla needs for its electric vehicles' batteries. In line with this, Vale is pushing to increase its exposure to the electric vehicle industry.

Fertilizer products, primarily phosphates and nitrogen: Sales of fertilizer products represented 6% of total company revenues in 2014. In 2014, Vale sold 9 million metric tonnes of fertilizer products.

Copper: Sales of copper concentrate represented 4% of total company revenues in 2014. In 2014, Vale sold 353,000 metric tonnes of copper. The company owns copper mines in Brazil, Canada, Chile and Zambia.

Manganese and alloys: Sales of manganese and alloys represented 1% of total company revenues in 2014. In 2014, Vale sold 2 million metric tonnes of manganese and alloys.

Coal: Sales of coal represented 2% of total company revenues in 2014. In 2014, Vale sold 7.5 million metric tonnes of coal. The company owns coal mines in Australia and Mozambique.

=== Logistics ===
==== Railroads ====
From 2000 to 2006, Vale invested more than $1.3 billion on the acquisition of over 361 locomotives and around 14,090 freight cars, those locomotives were primarily for iron ore transportation, but some were for regular cargo. Some of the locomotives purchased were secondhand for refurbishment but at least 55 of the locomotives acquired were new ones of the model EMD SD70M, each one costing about $2 million.

After those investments, Vale became the owner of over 800 locomotives and more than 35,000 freight cars.

Vale owns the concession of three Brazilian railways: Vitória-Minas Railway (EFVM), Ferrovia Centro-Atlântica (FCA) and Carajás railroad (EFC).

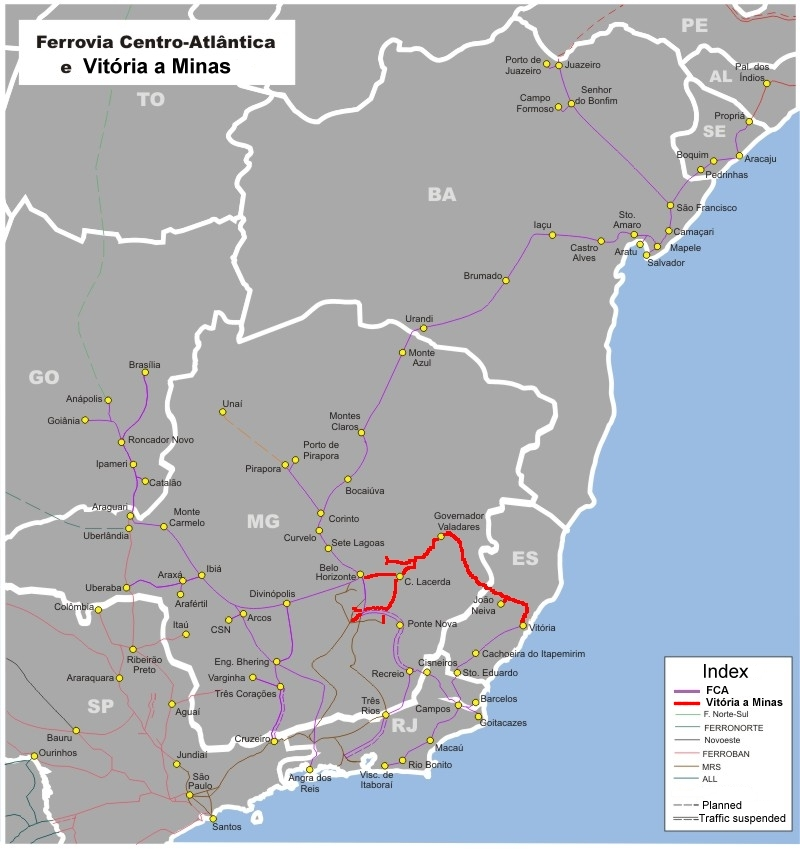
Ferrovia Centro-Atlântica and Vitória a Minas railroads

- Vitória a Minas railroad — Vale operates under a 30-year contract this 905 km, 1,000 mm (3 ft 3 3/8 in) railroad, which is used to transport iron from the Iron Quadrangle in Minas Gerais to the Port of Tubarão in the state of Espírito Santo. The concession expires in 2027. This railroad also carried 1.1 million passengers in 2006.
- Carajás railroad — The concession of this 892 km, 1,600 mm (5 ft 3 in) gauge railroad also expires in 2027, it links Carajás iron ore mines in the state of Pará to Ponta da Madeira port terminal in the state of Maranhão. Vale operates a train of 3.2 km and 340 cars on this railroad.
- Ferrovia Centro-Atlântica — Vale controls this railroad through the subsidiary FCA. As it is shown on the Vale's operations map above, this 7,000 km, 1,000 mm (3 ft 3 3/8 in) railroad extends through 6 Brazilian states, this railroad originally belonged to the RFFSA. Vale's concession of this railroad expires in 2026.
- Vale also has a stake in railway operators in Mozambique and Malawi via the Nacala Logistics Corridor.

==== Ports and container terminals ====
===== Brazil =====
On February 5, 2019, the state court of the Province of Minas Gerais ordered Vale to halt use of eight of its tailings dams, including the Laranjeiras dam at Brucutu.

- Port of Tubarão — Vale owns and operates this port located in Vitória, Brazil in the state of Espírito Santo. It's the largest iron ore embarking port in the world. Around 80 million metric tonnes of iron ore (30% of the company's annual production) are shipped through this port.
- Ponta da Madeira — Located in the state of Maranhão, it ships around 70 million metric tonnes mostly of iron ore, but also of manganese and copper for the company; it is being upgraded for the S11D project
- Port of Sepetiba — Vale operates two maritime terminals in the Port of Sepetiba area located in the state of Rio de Janeiro, together they ship around 60 million metric tonnes of iron ore.
- Feijão mine — site of the Brumadinho dam disaster on 25 January 2019.

Vale also operates port terminals in the state of Sergipe and two others in the state of Espírito Santo.

===== Malaysia =====
- Teluk Rubiah Maritime Terminal (TRMT), a state of the art maritime terminal in Manjung District, Perak, operates as a distribution centre for iron ore in the Asia Pacific region. The terminal was constructed in 2011 and completed in 2014 at a cost of US$1.4 billion. 60% of its workforce are Manjung District locals.

==== Ships ====
Vale has also entered the shipping business by ordering 35 Very Large Ore Carriers (VLOC) to transport iron ore between South America and Asia. These 362-metre (1,188 ft), 400,000 DWT ships are the longest and largest dry bulk carriers in the world. The first ship, Vale Brasil, was delivered in March 2011.

=== Energy ===
Vale's energy business is focused on power production to fulfill the needs of its mining operations, as well as supplying the general Brazilian power grid. In 2005, it consumed 16.9 TWh of electrical power, accounting for 4.4% of Brazil's total consumption in that year.

Vale has participation in 8 hydroelectric plants, with 7 of these located in the state of Minas Gerais. Vale's investment in hydroelectric power plants totals $880 million. The company also plans to build a 600 MW thermoelectric power plant in the state of Pará.

In 2011, Vale S.A. bought 70% of Biopalma for US$ 173.5 million for the production of B20 fuel (20% biodiesel, 80% diesel) for Petrobras. The company was sold in 2020 for Brasil BioFuels after a liability of R$ 965 million.

Vale's Hydroelectric power plants
Name	Location	Production Capacity	Vale's Ownership	Vale's Investment	Start of Operations
Aimorés	Minas Gerais	330 MW	51%	$141 million	July 2005
Candonga	Minas Gerais	140 MW	50%	$46 million	September 2004
Capim Branco I	Minas Gerais	240 MW	48.42%	$90 million	February 2006
Capim Branco II	Minas Gerais	210 MW	48.42%	$90 million	May 2007
Estreito	Tocantins	1,087 MW	30%	$355 million	August 2009
Funil	Minas Gerais	180 MW	51%	$49 million	December 2002
Igarapava	Minas Gerais	210 MW	38.15%	$88.1 million	January 1999
Porto Estrela	Minas Gerais	112 MW	33.33%%	$20 million	September 2001

Vale also operates hydroelectric plants in Canada and Indonesia.

=== Rebranding ===
In November 2007, the company retired the name CVRD in favour of simplified company name of Vale, and rebranded.

== History ==
Companhia Vale do Rio Doce (widely known as CVRD prior to 2007) (in English, "Doce River Valley Company") was founded in Itabira, Minas Gerais, by the Brazilian Federal Government on 1 June 1942.

One year later the Vitória a Minas railroad was inaugurated.

The 1950s marked Companhia Vale do Rio Doce's entry into the global iron ore market, after the company's mine-railroad-port complex was modernized and iron ore prices doubled. At first, sales were mostly to the United States, but exports to Europe increased over the course of the decade.

In 1966, the company inaugurated in Espírito Santo the Port of Tubarão, which was to become the most important port for CVRD and is still used to export iron ore mined from the Iron Quadrangle in Minas Gerais.

The company acquired a majority interest in the Carajás Mine, with over 1.5 billion tonnes of iron ore in reserves, in 1970.

In 1974, Vale became the world's biggest exporter of iron ore, a title which it still holds today.

In 1982, Vale began to diversify after it started to produce aluminium in Rio de Janeiro.

In the early-to-mid-1980s, profits increased considerably under the leadership of Eliezer Batista, father of Eike Batista.

In 1985, Vale started to explore the Carajás Mine in the state of Pará just after the 1,600 mm (5 ft 3 in) gauge Carajás railroad was opened.

In 1986, Ponta Madeira port terminal, which is still used to export iron ore mined at the Carajás Mine, was inaugurated in the state of Maranhão.

In March 2017, Vale SA chose a commodities industry veteran, Fabio Schvartsman, as chief executive officer. Schvartsman was CEO of Klabin SA, Brazil's largest paper and cardboard producer, for the previous six years.

=== Privatization in 1997 ===
In May 1997, despite protests by Vale employees and some politicians, the Brazilian Government auctioned a 41.73% interest in the company, which was sold for R$3.34 billion (US$3.13 billion). The largest interest purchased was a 16.3% stake purchased by Brazilian steel company Companhia Siderúrgica Nacional.

=== Sale of wood pulp businesses ===
In 2001, Vale sold its Cenibra wood pulp business to Aracruz and Votorantim Celulose e Papel jointly for US$670.5 million to focus on mining and logistics.

In 2002, Vale sold 100,000 acres of land and the eucalyptus forests thereon related to its wood pulp business for R$137 million.

=== Sale of steel businesses ===
In 2000, the company sold its stake in Açominas to Gerdau in exchange for preferred shares in Gerdau.

In 2001, Vale sold its stake in Companhia Siderúrgica Nacional for R$520 million.

In 2004, Vale sold its stake in CST to Arcelor for US$415.1 million.

In 2006, Vale sold its interest in Siderar to Ternium for US$107.5 million.

In 2006, the company sold 5,362,928 shares in Usiminas for or R$378.6 million. In 2007, the company sold the majority of its stake in Usiminas. In 2009, the company sold its remaining stake in Usiminas.

=== Sale of coal businesses ===
In 2014, Vale announced the sale of coal assets in Mozambique to Mitsui in a $950 million transaction.

In 2015, Vale's Integra coal mine located in Australia's Hunter Valley in New South Wales was sold to Glencore and Bloomfield in a complex multi-party deal.

=== Acquisitions of Brazilian iron ore companies ===
In May 2000, the company acquired Sociomex, owner of the Gongo Sôco Mine, with proven reserves of approximately 75 million tonnes.

In May 2000, the company also acquired a controlling interest in Samitri, one of the biggest pelletizing companies of Brazil.

In April 2001, the company acquired Ferteco, then the third largest Brazilian producer of iron ore, with a production capacity of 15 million tonnes per year.

In 2006, the company acquired Rio Verde Mineração for $47 million.

==== Acquisition of Caemi and acquisition and partial disposition of MBR ====
On 1 April 2000, Vale offered to pay Mitsui US$277 million for 50% of the common shares and US$150 million for 40% of the preferred stock in Caemi. Caemi owned MBR, Brazil's second largest iron ore producer, mining over 60 million tonnes per year.

The acquisition was approved by European regulators subject to conditions.

In September 2003, Vale purchased an additional stake in Caemi from Mitsui for US$426.4 million.

On 23 January 2006, the company announced a stock swap merger to acquire the interest Caemi that it did not already own.

In 2007, increased its ownership in MBR by purchasing additional interests from Mitsui for US$114.5 million.

Also in 2007, Vale announced that it will lease the shares of MBR that it did not already own from their 7 Japanese shareholders for a 30-year period. The agreement required the company to pay a total of US$60.5 million in 2007 and US$48.1 million annually for a 30-year period and gave it total control of MBR.

In 2015, Vale announced the sale of a 36.4% interest in MBR for R$4 billion.

=== Diversification into non-ferrous metals, coal and phosphate ===
In 2001, Vale increased its copper mining operations by purchasing the Sossego mine in Carajas, in northern Brazil, for $48.5 million.

In 2005, Vale acquired Canico Resource, owner of a nickel mine in Brazil, after increasing its offer to $865 million.

In October 2006, Vale acquired Canadian-based nickel producer Inco for $18.9 billion, including $17.7 billion in cash and the assumption of $1.2 billion in debt. To gain approval from Canadian authorities, Vale promised to continue investments in Canada and not lay off people for 3 years after closing.

In 2007, Vale made a major entry into coal mining by acquiring AMCI Holdings Australia for AU$835 million.

In 2010, Vale launched a public offer to acquire fertilizer and copper producer Paranapanema.

In 2010, Vale acquired a controlling interest in Fosfertil via a series of transactions.

In June 2011, Jason Chenier and Jordan Fram were killed at the 3,000 foot level of the Frood Mine near Sudbury, Ontario.

In 2011, the company sold its aluminum business to Norsk Hydro in a US$5.27 billion transaction. Norsk Hydro thus became a truly integrated aluminium company. This gave Hydro the world's largest alumina refinery and aimed to "secure raw materials for more than a hundred years of aluminum production". Hydro gained a large bauxite supply, including control of the Paragominas mine, one of the largest bauxite mines in the world. It also gained large alumina refining and aluminum production capacity, including a 51 percent stake in the Albras aluminum plant and 91 percent ownership of Alunorte, then the world's largest alumina refinery and now the largest outside China.

In July 2012, Vale sold its ferro-manganese plants in Europe to Glencore for $160 million.

In 2014, Vale sold its interest in Fosbrasil S.A., a manufacturer of phosphate-based products to Israel Chemicals Ltd for $52 million.

In 2015, the company announced that it would sell a 25% interest in gold produced from its Salobo mine, located in Brazil, to Silver Wheaton for US$900 million.

In 2015, the company entered into a letter of intent to sell bauxite assets to Norsk Hydro.

On 26 November 2015, Vale announced that it planned to reduce its budget for capital expenditures from US$8 billion in 2015 to US$6.2 billion in 2016, with further reductions to US$4–5 billion by 2018.

In May 2023 it was announced by Eduardo Bartolomeo that Mark Cutifani would be appointed as Chair of the new Vale Base Metals (VBM) subsidiary in a spin-off event. Vale was looking to divest from its tar baby, as early as December 2022. At the time VBM was a supplier to Tesla and General Motors. Reports were afoot that GM, Mitsui, and the Saudi Public Investment Fund were interested buyers of a 10% stake. Former Tesla executive Jerome Guillen would join the "energy transition board" of VBM along with Cutifani.

Vale spun out its metals business as a separate ringfenced entity headquartered in Toronto, with an independent board chaired by Cutifani. That process completed in July 2023. The unit was then one of the world’s largest producers of nickel, copper, and cobalt, and has operations across the globe. The parent company's chief executive stated that Cutifani could help the division explore a future “liquidity event”. In early 2023, the parent company earned 80% of its profits in its South American iron mines, and the balance from its Base Metals group.

== Business trends ==
The key trends for Vale are (as of the financial year ending 31 December):

	Revenue (USD billion)	EBIT (USD billion)	Total Assets (USD billion)	Net Assets (USD billion)	Market cap (USD billion)
2005	14.54	6.35	22.64	13.19	47.37
2006	19.65	9.16	60.92	22.48	71.85
2007	32.24	16.82	76.71	35.83	160.71
2008	58.04	26.10	79.99	45.04	63.13
2009	33.58	13.14	102.27	60.49	151.32
2010	46.26	23.23	129.13	72.44	185.47
2011	57.49	27.64	126.91	77.81	115.08
2012	50.18	7.81	130.57	74.82	108.01
2013	46.76	8.95	124.59	64.93	78.58
2014	37.53	3.01	116.48	56.32	42.15
2015	25.60	−16.83	88.49	35.70	16.95
2016	26.04	9.59	99.01	41.02	39.26
2017	33.96	9.73	99.18	44.77	63.56
2018	36.57	8.71	88.19	44.83	67.61
2019	37.57	−0.23	91.71	38.99	67.69
2020	40.01	7.40	92.00	34.82	85.97
2021	53.89	34.38	89.44	35.30	65.75
2022	43.83	20.92	86.89	37.35	79.14
2023	41.78	12.69	94.18	40.98	69.01
2024	38.05	8.34	80.15	34.52	38.07

== Disasters and incidents ==
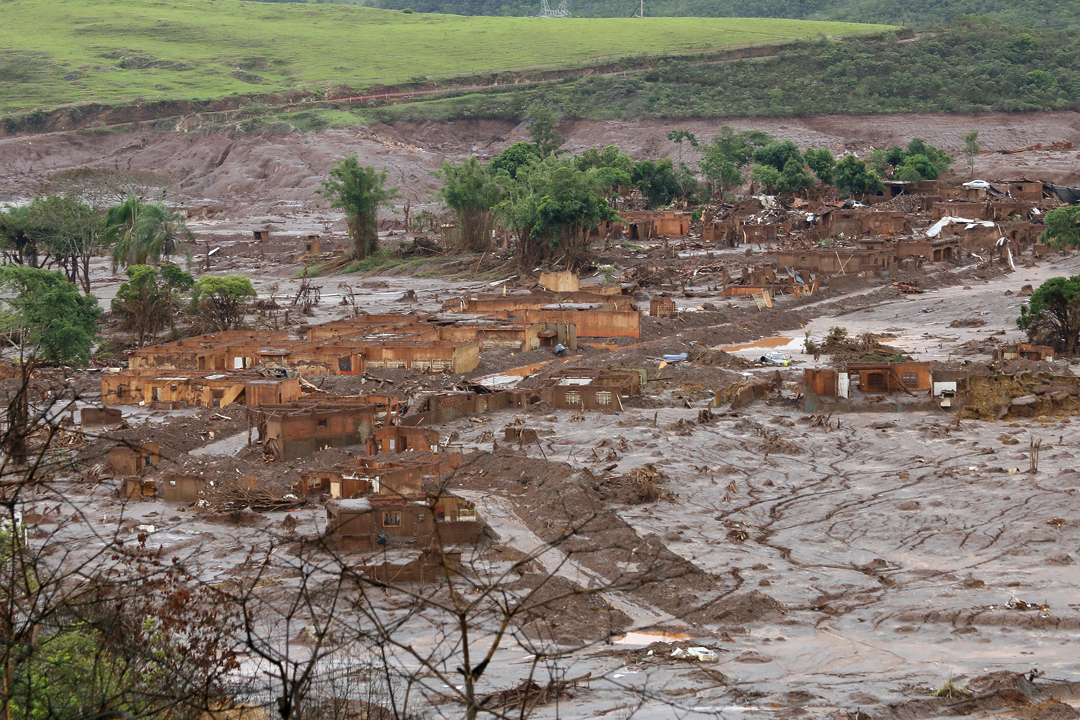
A village flooded in the Mariana dam disaster (2015). The dam was a property of Samarco, a joint venture between Vale and BHP.

=== Bento Rodrigues dam collapse ===
On 5 November 2015, the Mariana dam disaster caused 19 deaths and massive environmental contamination when a tailings dam collapsed at the Samarco mining site, co-owned by Vale and BHP. Heavy metal contamination of the Doce River caused water emergencies in many downstream cities which depend on the river for drinking water. Activities at the mine were suspended, and the companies agreed to pay compensation of R$4.4 billion (US$1.55 billion).

An investigation into the disaster commissioned by BHP, Vale and Samarco found the collapse was due to a variety of construction and design flaws. In June 2018, Samarco, Vale and BHP signed an agreement to drop a US$7 billion lawsuit and allow two years for the companies to address the greater US$55 billion suit seeking social, environmental and economic compensation.

=== Brumadinho dam disaster ===
On 25 January 2019, the Brumadinho dam disaster occurred at the Córrego do Feijão mine in the Brazilian state of Minas Gerais, releasing 3 billion gallons of mine waste, in a wave of red iron ore which destroyed the mine's cafeteria, where many workers were present and died, and which flooded the town of Brumadinho. 270 were killed. In 2020, prosecutors found that Vale had falsified safety reports for at least ten of its dams. They later charged sixteen officials of Vale including its CEO, with manslaughter.

In 2021, Vale agreed to pay victims $7 billion. Though substantially deadlier, the environmental devastation was not as severe as with Bento Rodrigues.

Following the Córrego do Feijão disaster, a Brazilian court ordered Vale to stop disposing of tailings at eight dams.

=== Tax dispute ===
In 2013, Vale S.A. agreed to pay the equivalent of $9.5 billion to settle a tax dispute with the Brazilian authorities regarding its overseas profits from 2003 to 2012.

=== Totten Mine ===
On September 28, 2021, thirty-nine miners were trapped underground for 24 hours at the Totten Mine in Ontario after the entrance shaft became obstructed.

== Criticism ==
In January 2012, Vale received the "people's choice" Public Eye Award as the corporation with the most "contempt for the environment and human rights" in the world. Vale received 25,000 votes, with the Belo Monte Dam cited as a reason.

During the interim between the two dam disasters of 2015 and 2019; Vale had denied owning an upstream tailings waste structure such as collapsed, causing the Brumadinho dam to burst.

Following the 2019 disaster, BBC News reported that "Correspondents say the alarm system the company had installed to warn residents of any risk did not go off."

In February 2021, an agreement was signed that required Vale to pay over $7 billion in compensation to the families of the victims. $55 million was the settlement cost to the company for its role in making false certifications in regards to the 2019 disaster which the company reached with the U.S. Securities and Exchange Commission in late March 2023.

== Bibliography ==
- (in French) Michel Braudeau, « Mourir dans l'or à Serra Pelada », in Le rêve amazonien, éditions Gallimard, 2004 (ISBN 2-07-077049-4).
