= Caemi =

Brazilian mining holding company

CAEMI Mineração e Metalurgia S.A.
- Type: Public
- Traded as: B3: CMET4
- Industry: Mining, Logistics
- Founded: Quadrilátero Ferrífero, Iron Quadrangle, Minas Gerais 1942
- Headquarters: Nova Lima, Brazil
- Key people: Augusto Antunes (founder)
- Products: raw materials, logistics and railway transport
- Revenue: ▲$2.3 billion USD (2005)
- Net income: ▲$824 million (2005)
- Parent: Vale
- Subsidiaries: CADAM, MBR

Caemi Mineração e Metallurgia S.A. was a major Brazilian mining holding company that ceased to exist in December 2006 after it was merged into Vale. Caemi means Companhia Auxiliar de Empresas de Mineração. in English it means Auxiliary Company of Mining Companies.

== Operations ==
The company owned iron ore mines in the so-called Iron Quadrangle region of the state of Minas Gerais, and kaolin mines in the northern states of Amapá and Pará. The company also owned a stake in MRS Logística, which owns a railway network in southeastern Brazil. Caemi's stock was traded on Bovespa.

== MBR – Minerações Brasileiras Reunidas ==
Caemi started MBR in a partnership with M. A. Hanna Company in 1965. MBR since 1971 had been the second biggest iron ore producer in Brazil, mining in 2005 over 50 million tonnes of iron ore or around 25% of Brazilian production.

MBR until Vale acquired 100% of Caemi's capital in 2006 was owned by two companies: Caemi and EBM (Empreendimentos Brasileiros de Mineração S.A.). Caemi had a 49% stake at MBR while EBM owned the other 51% of the company. The problem is that Caemi also owned 70.1% of EBM, this fact brings Caemi's total stake at MBR to 84.75%. Caemi's 84.75% participation at MBR is recognized at the company's 2005 Annual Report, which was Caemi's last.

EBM, besides Caemi had two other investors:

- Vale owned 9.9% of EBM since 2001, participation which was purchased from Bethlehem Steel
- Japanese investors owned the remaining 20% of EBM and in this group were included the following companies: Mitsui, Nisshin Steel, Nippon Steel, Mitsubishi Corporation, JFE Steel, Itochu, Sumitomo Group, Marubeni and Kobe Steel.

=== Vale acquires MBR ===
After Vale bought 100% of Caemi, Vale's stake at MBR reached 89.8%, that's because Vale became the owner of Caemi's 84.75% stake at MBR and Vale already indirectly owned 5.05% of MBR through its 9.9% stake at EBM.

This meant that Vale had only to acquire the remaining 20% of EBM at the hands of the Japanese investors in order to become owner of 100% of MBR. This objective was achieved in May 2007 when Vale bought for $231 million 6.25% of EBM from the Japanese investors and simultaneously leased the 13.75% left from the Japanese group in exchange for a down payment of $60.5 million and annual fee of $48.1 million for the next 30 years. Vale now owns 100% of MBR.

== Vale acquires Caemi ==
The mining company Vale bought between 2001 and 2006 100% of Caemi's capital for a total cost of $3.2 billion.

Back in 2001 Vale bought for $278.7 million 16.82% of Caemi's capital then in 2003 Vale purchased Mitsui's participation on Caemi for $426.4 million, raising Vale's participation to 60.2% of Caemi's total capital.

Finally on 31 March 2006 Vale purchased the remaining 39.8% of Caemi's capital in a stock swap deal worth $2.5 billion. In May the company's shares stopped being negotiated at Bovespa and then in December Caemi was merged into Vale and ceased to exist.
