= Vale Fertilizantes =

Brazilian fertilizer company

Vale Fertilizantes S.A.
- Company type: Sociedade Anônima
- Industry: Agriculture, Chemical
- Founded: 2010
- Headquarters: Uberaba, Minas Gerais, Brazil
- Products: Fertilizers
- Revenue: ▲US$ 1.6 billion (2010)
- Net income: ▲US$ 60.7 million (2010)
- Number of employees: 10,000
- Parent: Vale
- Website: ValeFertilizantes.com

Vale Fertilizantes is a Brazilian fertilizer company, was founded in 2010 after the purchase of Fosfertil by the giant Vale. The company made a profit of 114,000,000 reais in the first quarter of 2011.

The Mosaic Company completed the acquisition of Vale Fertilizantes in 2018.
