= 1988 CSN strike =

The 1988 CSN strike was a historic strike at the Companhia Siderúrgica Nacional in Brazil. Three workers died in an attempt by the police and the army to retake control of the facilities. Two of them were shot and taken by their co-workers to a hospital. One was found with heavy bruises in the head.

A monument designed by Oscar Niemeyer was erected in honour of the victims. It was partially destroyed by a bomb in the next day, and only in 1999 it was discovered that this was done by the army. This event is considered one of the landmarks of the period of "Brazilian late dictatorship."
