= Carajás mine =

Iron ore mine in Pará, Brazil

Carajás Mine
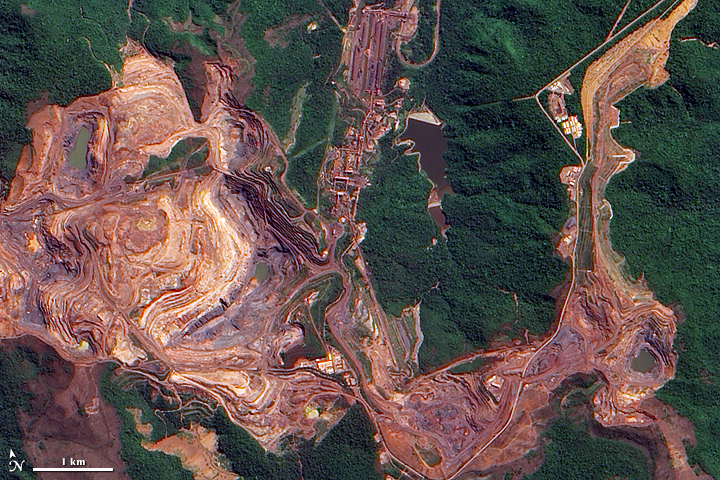
- Carajás mine open pit.

- Location in Brazil
- Location: Carajás mineral province, Parauapebas, Pará, Brazil; 06°03′31″S 50°10′37″W
- Products: Iron ore
- Production: 1 million metric tons of iron ore
- Financial year: 2007
- Opened: 1969
- Closed: NA
- Company: Vale S.A.
- Acquired: 1995

The Carajás Mine is the largest iron ore mine in the world. It is located in the municipality of Parauapebas, state of Pará in the Carajás Mountains of northern Brazil. The mine is operated as an open-pit mine, and is estimated to contain roughly 7.2 billion metric tonnes of iron ore, plus gold, manganese, bauxite, copper, and nickel. The mine is run by the Brazilian mining corporation Vale (formerly the Companhia Vale do Rio Doce), and was initially part-owned with US Steel from 1970 to 1977.

The mine is located in the mining concession area of the Carajás National Forest, which "contains known reserves of 18 billion tons with an average grade of 65.4% Fe."

The mine is largely powered by hydroelectric power from the Tucuruí Dam. In 2025 Vale was using artificial intelligence in managing operations at the mine, including the use of driverless trucks. The Carajás Railway carries the ore to the ports of São Marcos Bay in Maranhão for export.

== Geology ==
The mine lies in the banded iron formations in the southeastern portion of the Amazon Craton. The rocks range from the Archean to Paleoproterozoic in age. In addition to iron the deposits include manganese, bauxite, nickel, and other potential ores.
