= Botujuru (CPTM) =

Railway station in São Paulo, Brazil

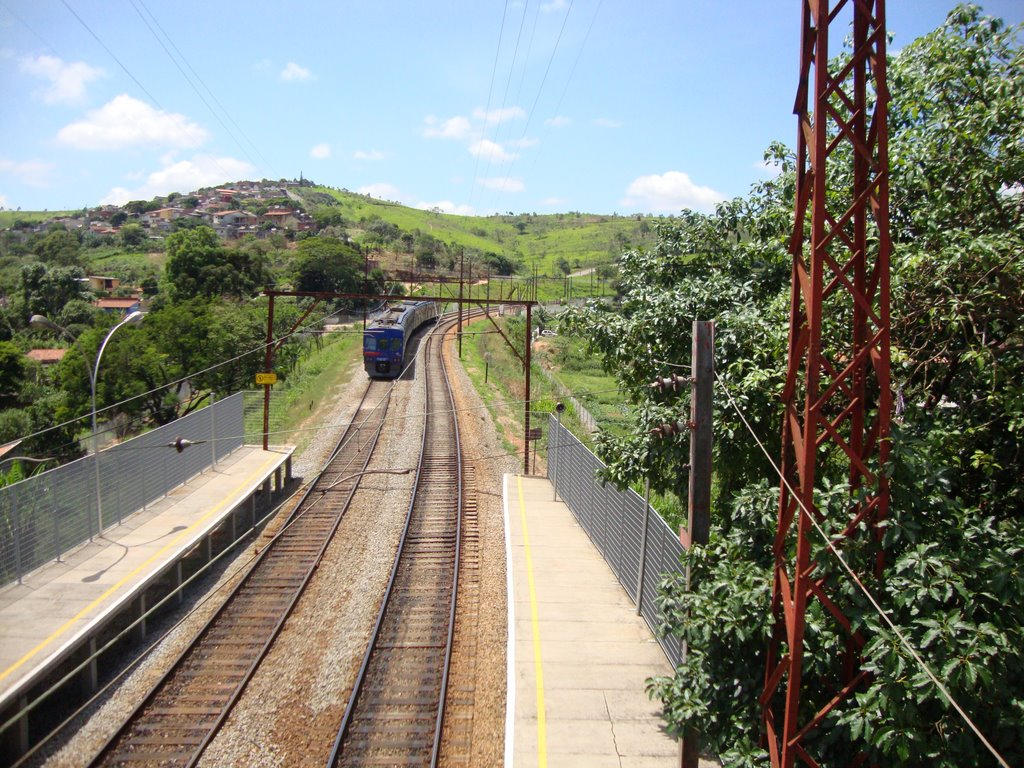

General information
- Location: R. Bela Vista, s/n Botujuru; Brazil
- Coordinates: 23.236023°S 46.767394°W
- Owner: Government of the State of São Paulo
- Operator: TIC Trens (Grupo Comporte)
- Platforms: Side platforms

Construction
- Structure type: At-grade

Other information
- Station code: BTJ

History
- Opened: 17 September 1908

Services
Preceding station	São Paulo Metropolitan Trains	Following station
Campo Limpo Paulista towards Jundiaí	Line 7	Francisco Morato towards Palmeiras-Barra Funda
Track layout
Location

Botujuru is a train station on TIC Trens Line 7-Ruby, located in the city of Campo Limpo Paulista.
