= Campo Limpo Paulista (CPTM) =

Railway station in São Paulo, Brazil

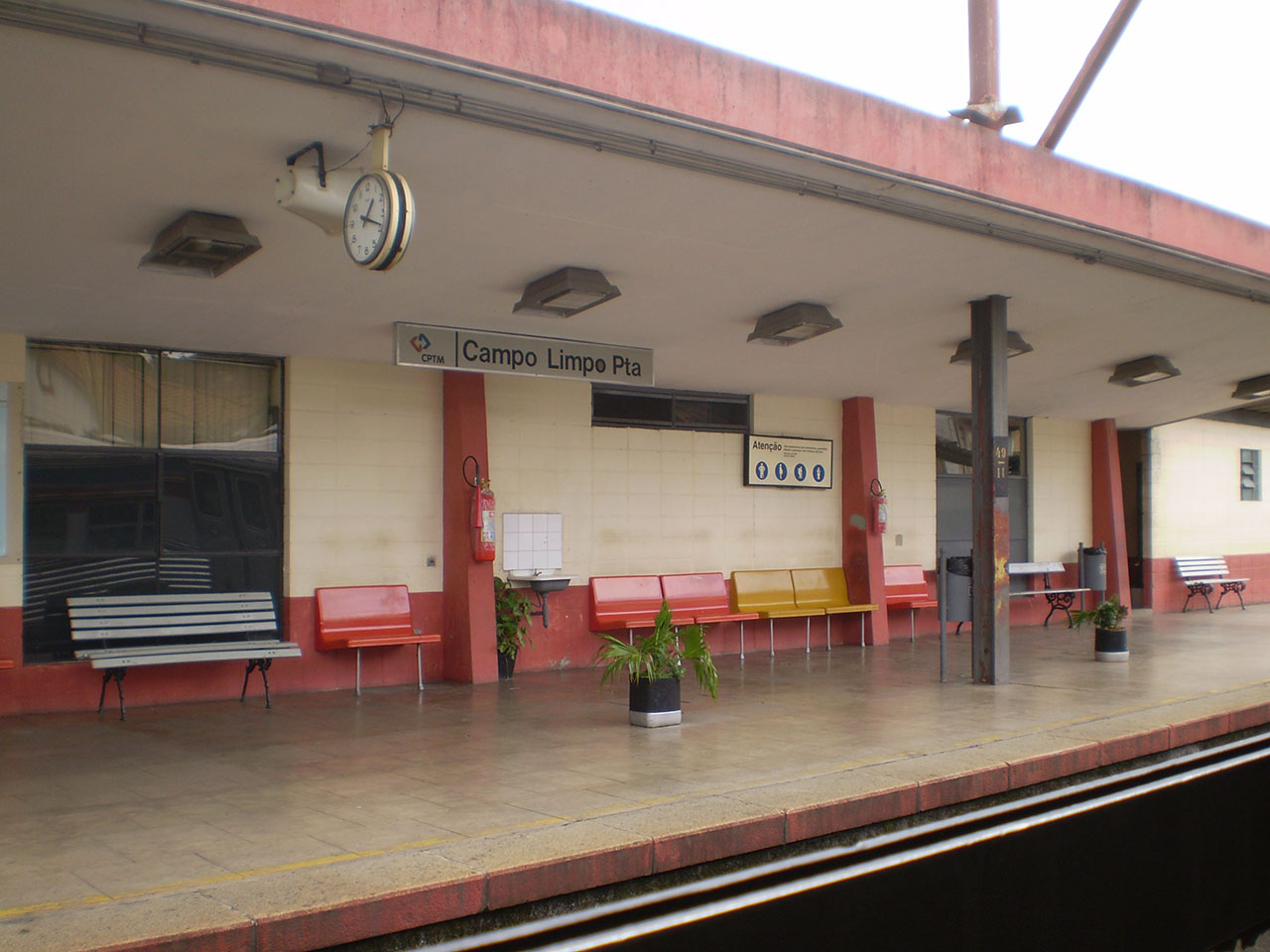
- Platform of the station.

General information
- Location: R. Felícia Pereira Pinto, s/n Vila Thomazina; Brazil
- Coordinates: 23.206256°S 46.785901°W
- Owner: Government of the State of São Paulo
- Operator: TIC Trens (Grupo Comporte)
- Platforms: Side platforms
- Connections: Campo Limpo Paulista Bus Terminal; Campo Limpo Paulista Road Terminal

Construction
- Structure type: At-grade

Other information
- Station code: CLP

History
- Opened: 1 January 1881
- Former names: Campo Limpo

Services
Preceding station	São Paulo Metropolitan Trains	Following station
Várzea Paulista towards Jundiaí	Line 7	Botujuru towards Palmeiras-Barra Funda
Track layout
Location

Campo Limpo Paulista is a train station on TIC Trens Line 7-Ruby, located in the city of Campo Limpo Paulista.
