= Caieiras (CPTM) =

Railway station in São Paulo, Brazil

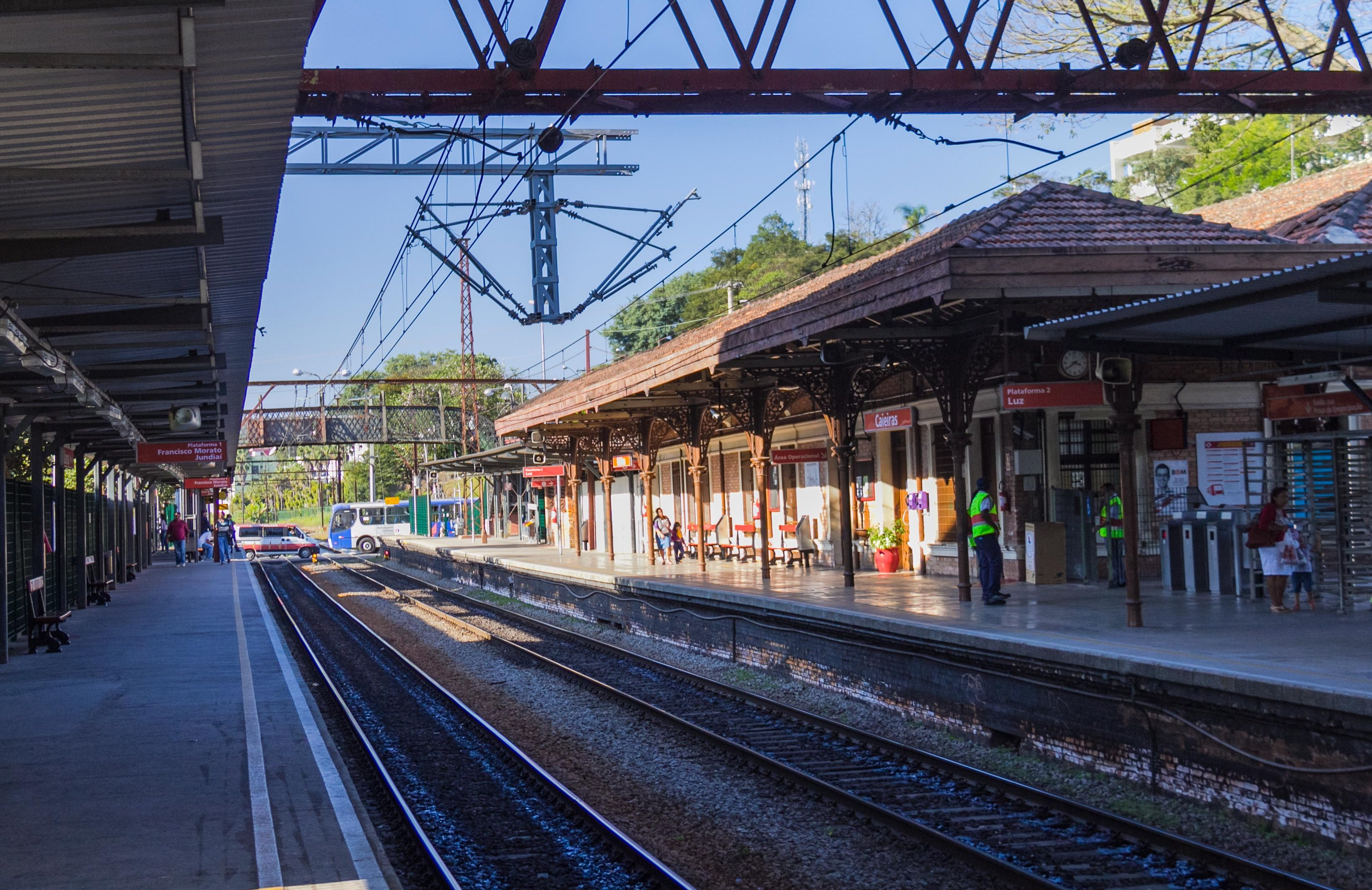

General information
- Location: Rod. Tancredo de Almeida Neves, Km 34; Centro; Brazil
- Coordinates: 23.365805°S 46.75089°W
- Owner: Government of the State of São Paulo
- Operator: TIC Trens (Grupo Comporte)
- Platforms: Side platforms
- Connections: Caieiras Bus Terminal

Construction
- Structure type: At-grade

Other information
- Station code: CAI

History
- Opened: 1 July 1883
- Former names: Caieiras de Perus; Cayeiras

Services
Preceding station	São Paulo Metropolitan Trains	Following station
Franco da Rocha towards Jundiaí	Line 7	Perus towards Palmeiras-Barra Funda
Track layout
Location

Caieiras is a train station on TIC Trens Line 7-Ruby, located in Caieiras.

== History ==
The station was opened by São Paulo Railway on 1 July 1883, being built to attend the district of Franco da Rocha, which was growing due to the arrival of industries.

Currently, Caieiras is operated by TIC Trens, after going through many administrations, public and private. It still keeps the same building from 19th century.

The station is also certified as a historical site by CONDEPHAAT.
