= Várzea Paulista (CPTM) =

Railway station in São Paulo, Brazil

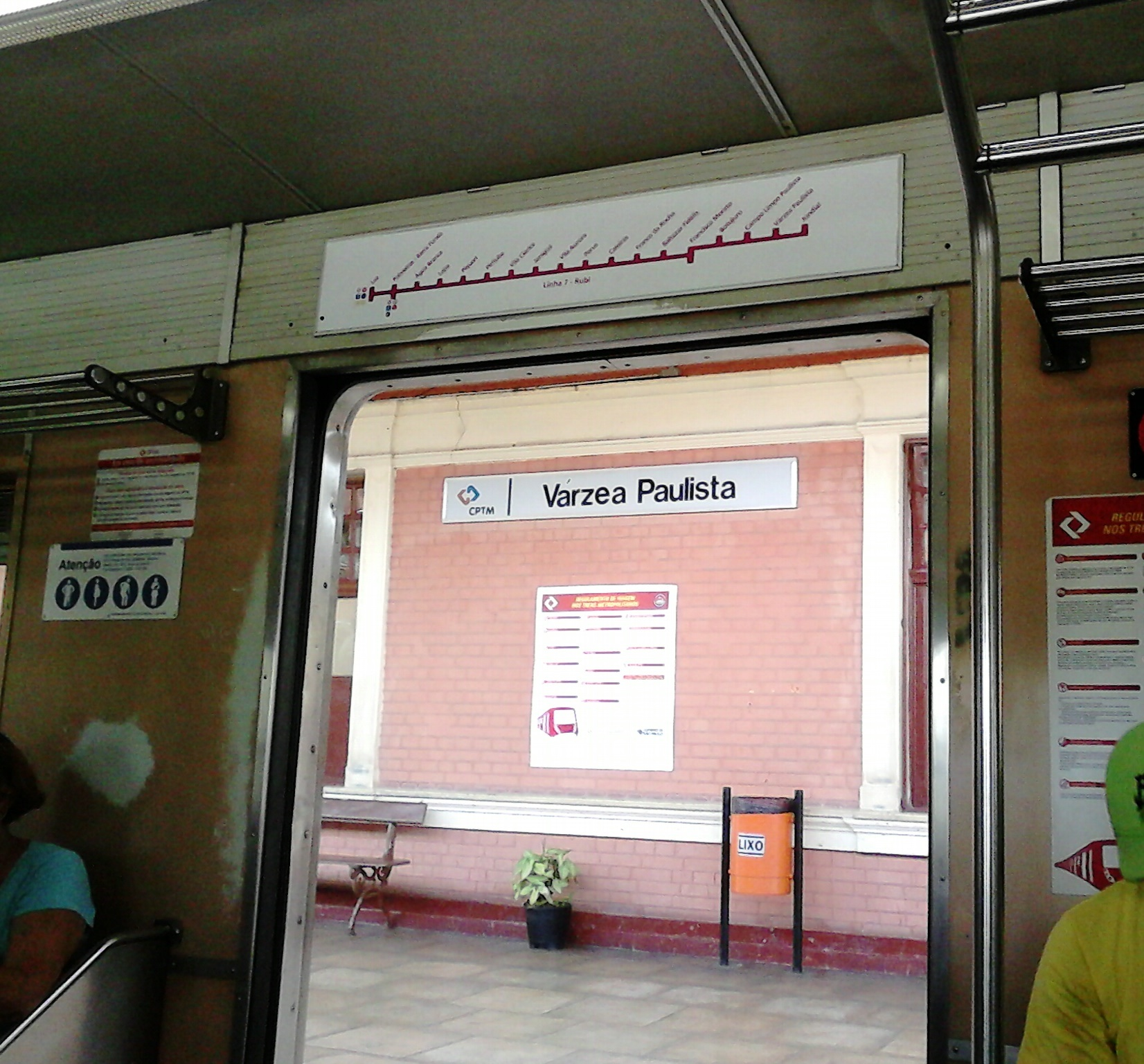
- View from a TUE Mafersa Hitachi 1700 stopped on the platform of the station.

General information
- Location: R. Antônio Feres, s/n Centro; Brazil
- Coordinates: 23.209047°S 46.829658°W
- Owner: Government of the State of São Paulo
- Operator: TIC Trens (Grupo Comporte)
- Platforms: Side platforms

Construction
- Structure type: At-grade

Other information
- Station code: VPL

History
- Opened: 1 July 1891
- Former names: Várzea; Secundino Veiga

Services
Preceding station	São Paulo Metropolitan Trains	Following station
Jundiaí Terminus	Line 7	Campo Limpo Paulista towards Palmeiras-Barra Funda
Track layout
Location

Várzea Paulista is a train station on TIC Trens Line 7-Ruby, located in the city of Várzea Paulista.

== History ==
Várzea station was opened on 1 July 1891, in a rural area of Jundiaí, during the first period of the railway modernization. The development of that region remained stagnant until 1923, when the chemical company L. Queiroz & Cia obtained lands in the city and built a factory next to the railway and the station, leading new residents to the location, known as Várzea, district of Jundiaí. In 1954, the district was briefly renamed to Secundino Veiga, as the station. In the following decades, Várzea Paulista was emancipated and the station is transferred from federal to state administration.

Currently, the station attends to the CPTM trains with the name of Várzea Paulista. In November 2011, in the 120th anniversary of the station, a set of buildings was certified as historical site by the CONDEPHAAT. CPTM hired a project of a new building for the station, similar to the current one, but there is no deadline for the start of the construction, budgeted at R$ 40,000,000 (US$ 18,552,108.56).
