= Francisco Morato (CPTM) =

Railway station in São Paulo, Brazil

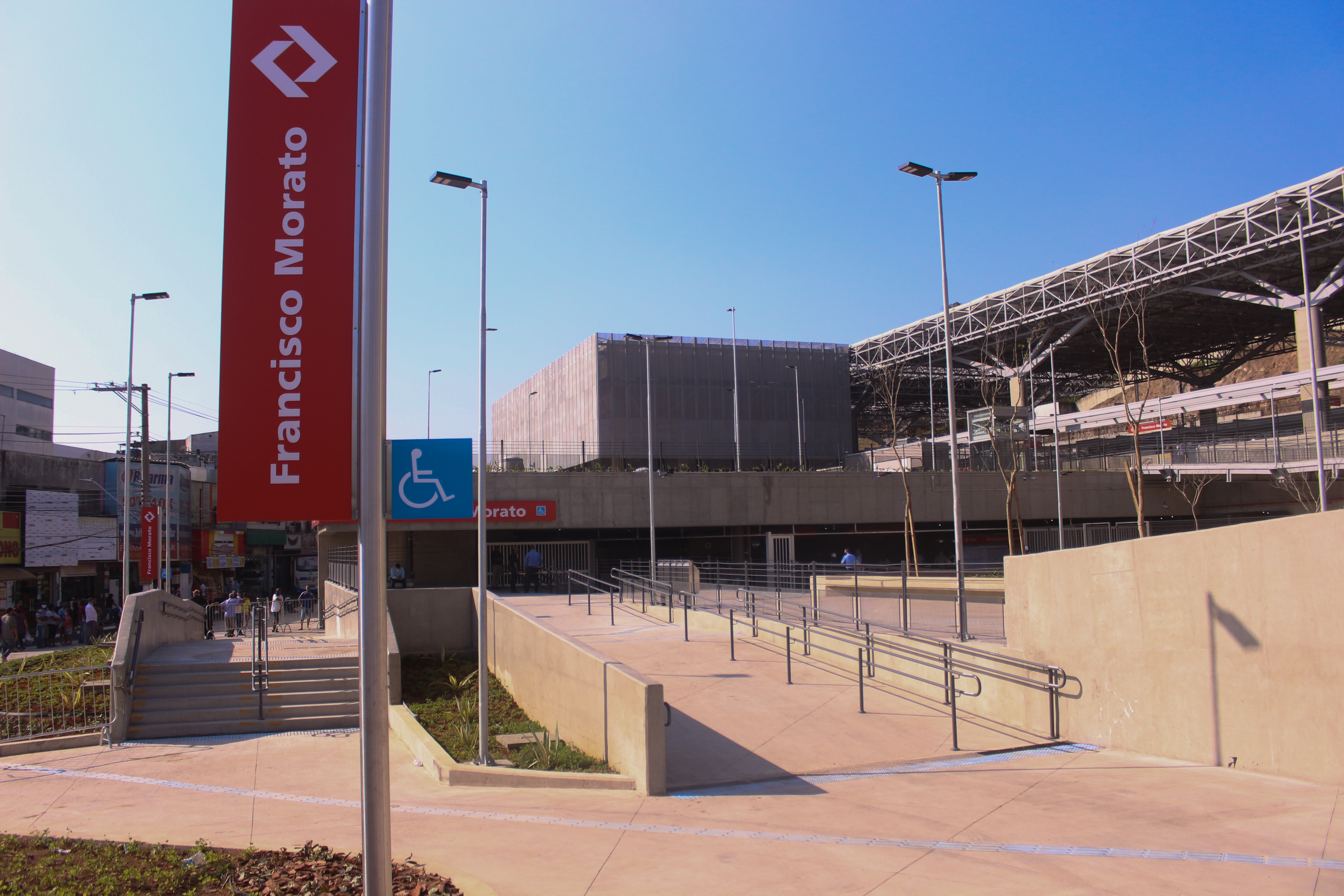

General information
- Location: R. Gerônimo Caetano Garcia, s/n Centro; Brazil
- Coordinates: 23.281723°S 46.742168°W
- Owner: Government of the State of São Paulo
- Operator: TIC Trens (Grupo Comporte)
- Platforms: Side and Island platforms
- Connections: East Francisco Morato Bus Terminal; West Francisco Morato Bus Terminal

Construction
- Structure type: At-grade

Other information
- Station code: FMO

History
- Opened: 16 February 1867
- Rebuilt: 7 October 2010 (temporary station); 31 August 2020
- Former names: Belém; Bethlem

Services
Preceding station	São Paulo Metropolitan Trains	Following station
Botujuru towards Jundiaí	Line 7	Baltazar Fidélis towards Palmeiras-Barra Funda
Track layout
Location

Francisco Morato is a train station on TIC Trens Line 7-Ruby, located in Francisco Morato.

== History ==
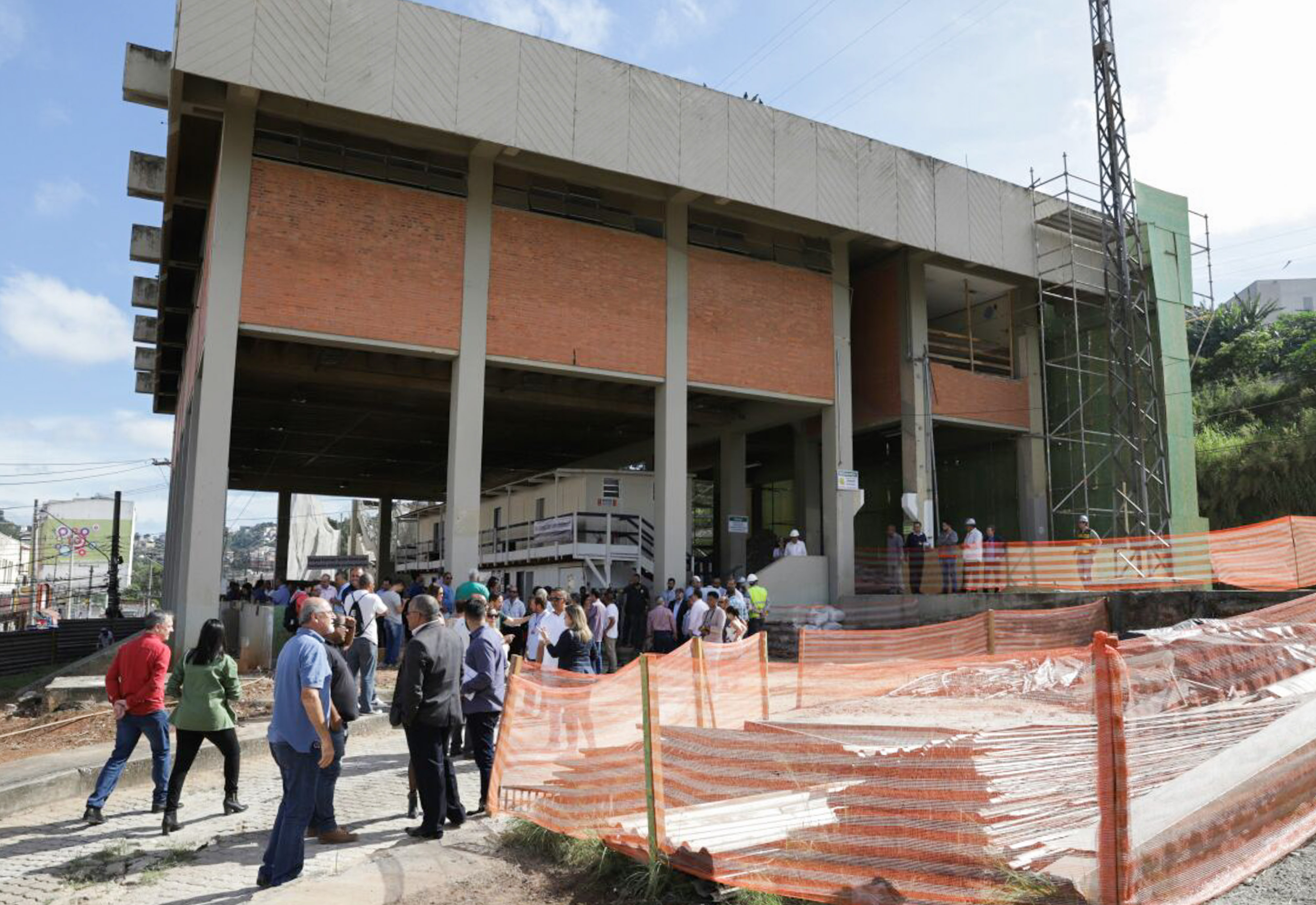
View from the station building, opened in 1982. It was in functional readjustment.

The station was opened on 14 February 1867 by São Paulo Railway, named as Belém. In the 1890s, in the first modernization of the railway, the old station was replaced by a new building.

After the death of the attorney and politician Francisco Antônio de Almeida Morato, in 1954, the station was named after him as Francisco Morato. In 1981, the old SPR station was demolished by RFFSA, being replaced by a new station, opened in 1982, although there were complementary works in the next year.

Since 1 June 1994, the station is operated by CPTM.

=== Project ===
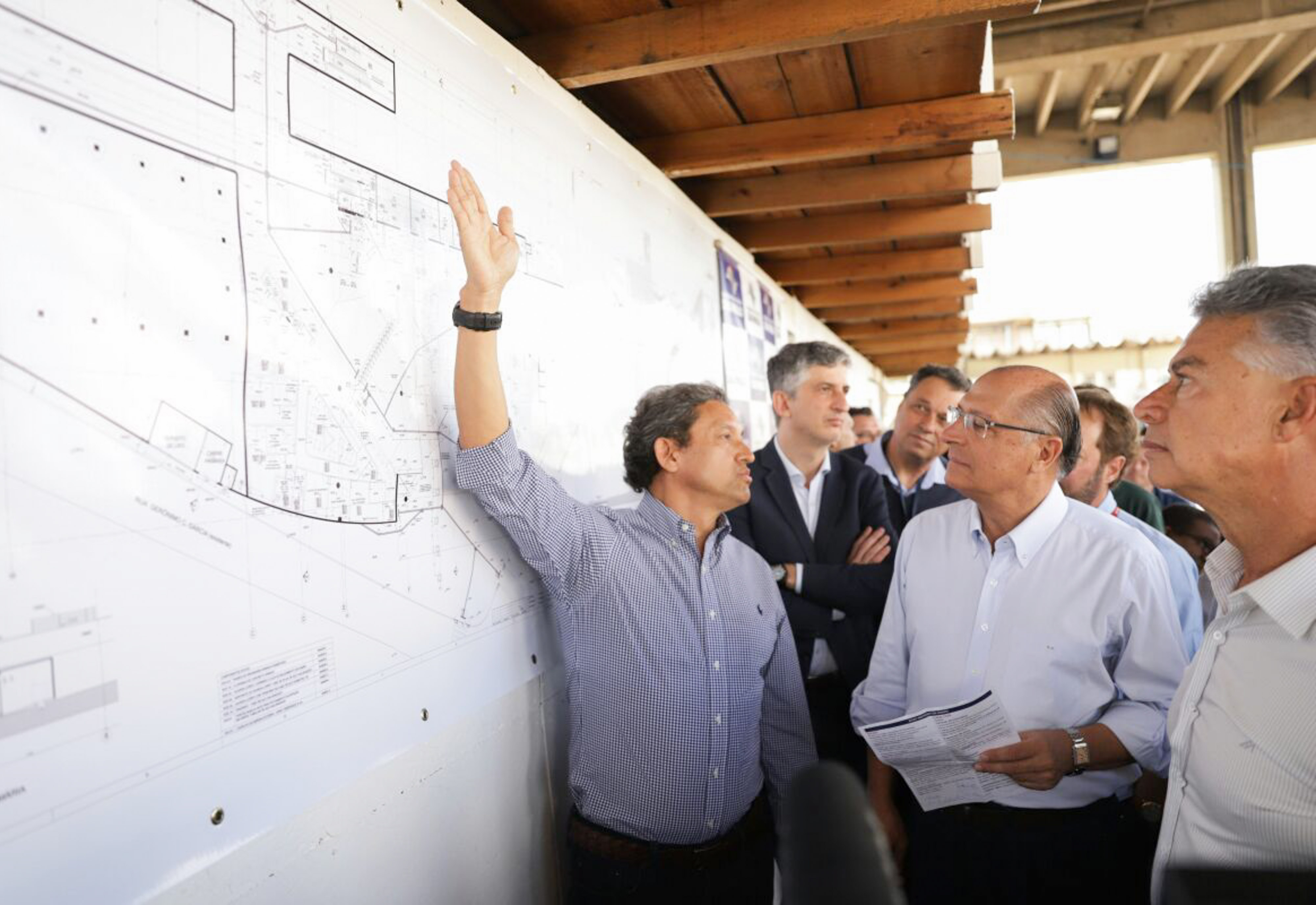
Governor Geraldo Alckmin inspecting the project. Made in 2007, the project of the new station was bid twice and was finally opened on 31 August 2020, by the double cost of the original budget.

On 29 January 2005, CPTM published the Concurrence no. 8379402011, aiming the modernization/rebuilding of 12 stations, divided in 6 allotments of 2 stations each. Francisco Morato was part of allotment 3, along with Jaraguá. On 18 March 2005, the final result was published, being homologated the Setepla/Pedro Taddei/Outec consortium, by the cost of R$ 1,281,520.12 (US$ 438,822.2) The project was present publicly in June 2007, during public audiences for the hiring of the works.

=== Construction ===
The construction was hired through the bidding no. 8334090011, which aimed to Francisco Morato and Franco da Rocha stations. The bidding result was published and homologated on 3 October 2009, being the winner the Consbem/TIISA/Serveng consortium, by the cost of R$65,697,942.51 (US$ 39,273,561.21) After the beginning of the works, CPTM and the consortium companies entered in a contestation about the cost of the contract. Later, the companies Consbem, TIISA, and Serveng abandoned the Francisco Morta contract, leaving the works on hold in 2011.

After breaking the contract, CPTM bids again the works through bidding no. 8042160011R, which result was published on 12 August 2016. The bidding was won by the consortium Telar-Spavias by the cost of R$114,900,000 (US$ 32,910,377.22). The deadline to the conclusion of the works was 16 months, but CPTM only authorized the beginning of the modernization only in February 2018.

== Toponymy ==
Originally named Belém, name of the farm which lands were sold for its construction, the station was renamed in 1954 to Francisco Morato. Born in 1868, Francisco Morato was a prominent jurist and politician. He died in 1948.
