= Service 710 (CPTM) =

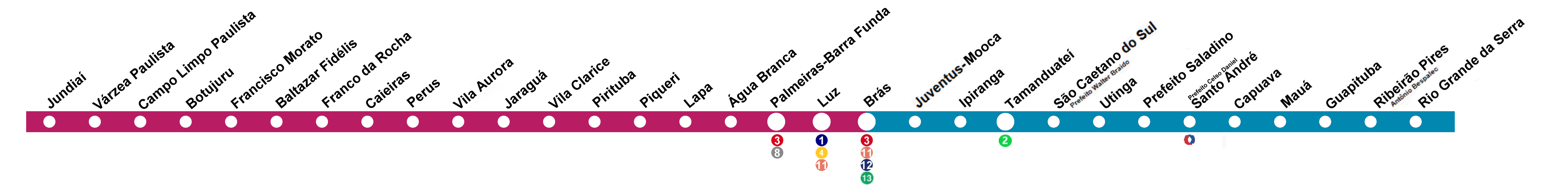

Overview
- Service type: Commuter rail
- Locale: Greater São Paulo
- First service: 4 May 2021
- Last service: 27 August 2025
- Former operator(s): CPTM
- Website: www.cptm.sp.gov.br

Route
- Termini: Jundiaí; Francisco Morato (peak hours); Rio Grande da Serra; Mauá (peak hours)
- Stops: 31; 24 (peak hours)
- Distance travelled: 100.7 km (62.6 mi)
- Average journey time: 2 hours, 8 minutes
- Service frequency: Every 6 minutes

On-board services
- Disabled access: Fully accessible

Technical
- Rolling stock: 40 Siemens/Mitsui/SGP Series 3000 (5 trains); 304 CAF Series 7000 (38 trains); 64 CAF Series 7500 (8 trains); 232 Hyundai Rotem Series 9500 (29 trains)
- Track gauge: 1,600 mm (5 ft 3 in)
- Electrification: 3,000 V DC catenary
- Operating speed: 80 km/h (50 mph)
- Track owner(s): CPTM

Service 710 (Portuguese: Serviço 710) was a commuter rail service operated by Companhia Paulista de Trens Metropolitanos in the Greater São Paulo, Brazil. It is a route that unifies both lines 7-Ruby and 10-Turquoise of the metropolitan rail network of the state of São Paulo. It offers a service from Jundiaí to Rio Grande da Serra stations and from Francisco Morato to Mauá during peak hours. Outside the Francisco Morato-Mauá loop, commuter will have to leave the train and wait for the next one to proceed, with a 12 minutes headway. After privatization of Line 7 in 2024, Service 710 operated for the last time on 27 August 2025.

== See also ==
- Companhia Paulista de Trens Metropolitanos
- Line 7 (CPTM)
- Line 10 (CPTM)
- Trens Intercidades
