= Várzea Paulista =

- Municipality
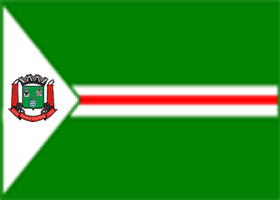
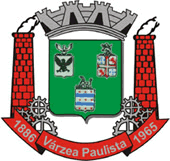
- Flag Coat of arms

- Location in São Paulo state

- Location in Brazil
- Coordinates: 23°12′41″S 46°49′42″W
- Country: Brazil
- Region: Southeast
- State: São Paulo

Area
  - Total: 35.1 km^{2} (13.6 sq mi)

Population (2022 Census)
  - Total: 115,771
  - Estimate (2025): 119,655
  - Density: 3,300/km^{2} (8,540/sq mi)
- Time zone: UTC−3 (BRT)

Várzea Paulista is a municipality in the state of São Paulo in Brazil. The population is 115,771 (2022 Census) in an area of 35.1 km^{2}. The elevation is 745 m. It is part of the agglomeration of Jundiaí.

== Media ==
In telecommunications, the city was served by Telecomunicações de São Paulo. In July 1998, this company was acquired by Telefónica, which adopted the Vivo brand in 2012. The company is currently an operator of cell phones, fixed lines, internet (fiber optics/4G) and television (satellite and cable).

== Geography ==
It is located at latitude 23º12'41" South and longitude 46º49'42" West, at an altitude of 745 meters. The municipality has its urban area conurbated with Jundiaí.

=== Metropolitan Region ===
The city is part of the Jundiaí Metropolitan Region. Várzea Paulista has ceased to be a dormitory town and has become an industrial city. The city is one of the cities that has been generating the most jobs (according to the IBGE), surpassing the average of other cities in the region.

Today, the city is known nationally and internationally as the City of Orchids, with one of the largest orchid nurseries in Latin America and several others spread throughout the city, not to mention local and independent producers. Since 2005, the city has held the Orquivárzea or Orchid Festival event, one of the largest orchid exhibitions in Brazil and the interior, attracting visitors from various parts of the country and national and international exhibitors.

=== Hydrography ===
- Jundiaí River

In 2013, Várzea Paulista had its sewage treatment plant inaugurated, treating 92% of all sewage produced in the city, making the Jundiaí River cleaner. The work being carried out in Itupeva, Salto and Indaiatuba, in addition to the work done in Jundiaí, will allow the Jundiaí River basin to become the first depolluted river basin in the country in a few years.

=== Highways ===
- SP-332
- SP-354

=== Railways ===
- Várzea Paulista Station on Line 7–Ruby of the São Paulo Metropolitan Train.

=== Airports ===
The city of Várzea Paulista is 9 km from Jundiaí Airport, 55 km from São Paulo Airport, 67 km from Guarulhos Airport and 43 km from Campinas Airport in the interior of the state, making the city an attraction for companies to set up in the city. In addition to the road and rail network that serves the entire Jundiaí Region.

== See also ==
- List of municipalities in São Paulo
