= Line 7 (CPTM) =

Commuter rail line in São Paulo

Line 7 (Ruby)
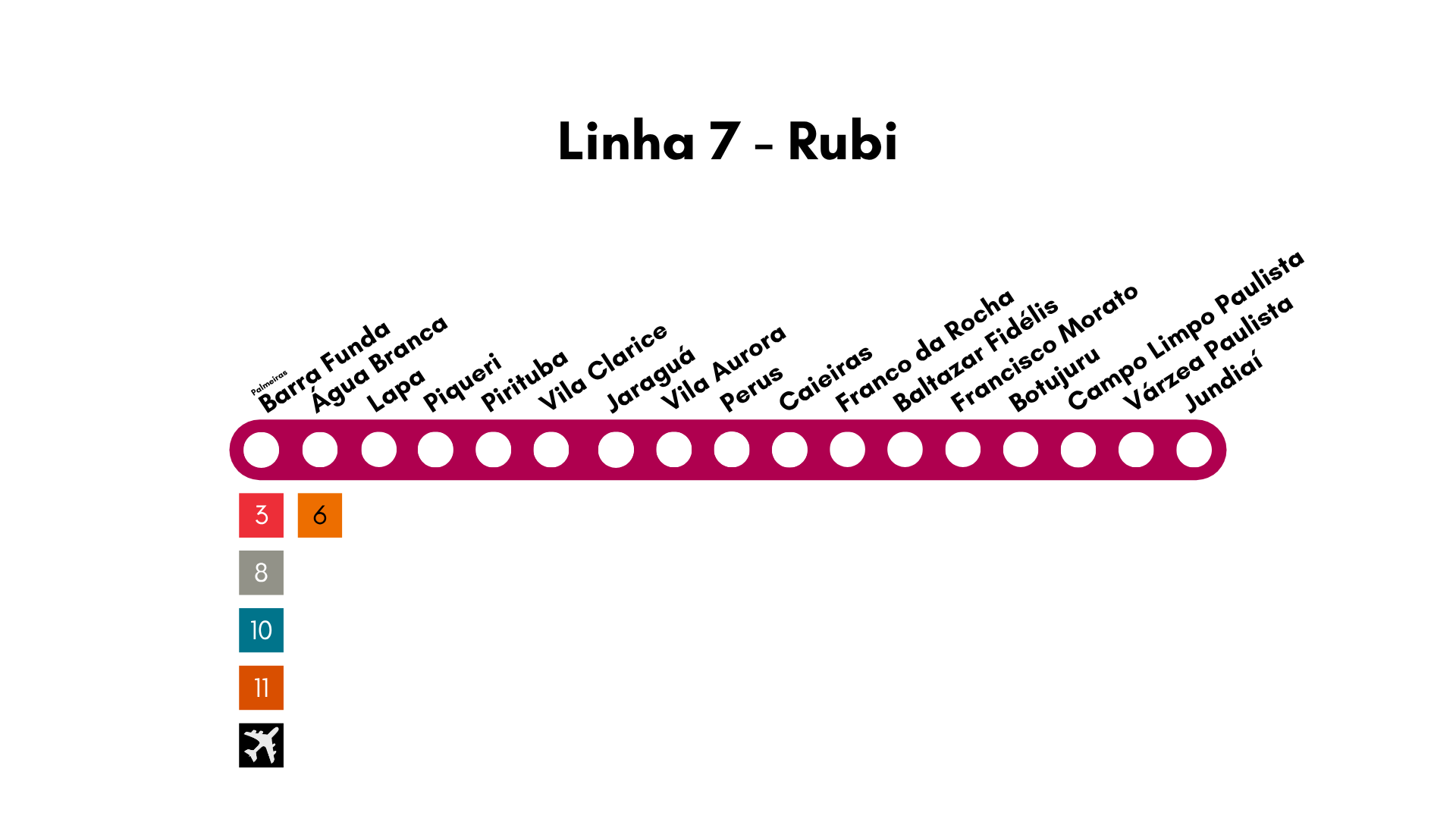

Overview
- Status: Operational
- Owner: Government of the State of São Paulo
- Locale: Greater São Paulo, Brazil
- Termini: Palmeiras–Barra Funda; Jundiaí
- Connecting lines: Current: Planned: 20
- Stations: 17

Service
- Type: Commuter rail
- System: São Paulo Metropolitan Trains
- Operator: TIC Trens (Grupo Comporte)
- Depots: Lapa rail yard; Jundiaí rail yard
- Rolling stock: 56 CAF 8500 Series (7 trains); 240 Hyundai Rotem 9500 Series (30 trains)

History
- Opened: 16 February 1867; 159 years ago (Note: As part of São Paulo Railway)

Technical
- Line length: 62.7 km (39.0 mi)
- Character: At-grade
- Track gauge: 1,600 mm (5 ft 3 in)
- Electrification: Overhead line, 3,000 V DC
- Operating speed: 90 km/h (56 mph)
- Signalling: Automatic block signaling

Line 7 (Ruby) (Portuguese: Linha 7–Rubi), formerly Line A (Brown), is one of the thirteen lines that make up the São Paulo Metro Rail Transport Network, in Brazil and the only line operated by TIC Trens.

== Stations ==
Station	Code	Platforms	Position	Connections	City
Palmeiras-Barra Funda	BFU	Island platforms	At-grade	Barra Funda Bus Terminal; Barra Funda Road Terminal	São Paulo
Água Branca	ABR	Side platforms	At-grade	(Planned)	São Paulo
Lapa	LPA	Side platforms	At-grade	-	São Paulo
Piqueri	PQR	Side platforms	At-grade	-	São Paulo
Pirituba	PRT	Side platforms	At-grade	Pirituba Bus Terminal; Pirituba–Lapa–Centro Bus Corridor	São Paulo
Vila Clarice	VCL	Side platforms	At-grade	-	São Paulo
Jaraguá	JRG	Side platforms	At-grade	-	São Paulo
Vila Aurora	VAU	Island platform	At-grade	-	São Paulo
Perus	PRU	Side platforms	At-grade	-	São Paulo
Caieiras	CAI	Side platforms	At-grade	Caieiras Bus Terminal	Caieiras
Franco da Rocha	FDR	Island platform	At-grade	East Franco da Rocha Bus Terminal; West Franco da Rocha Bus Terminal	Franco da Rocha
Baltazar Fidélis	BFI	Side platforms	At-grade	-	Franco da Rocha
Francisco Morato	FMO	Island and side platforms	At-grade	East Francisco Morato Bus Terminal; West Francisco Morato Bus Terminal	Francisco Morato
Botujuru	BTJ	Side platforms	At-grade	-	Campo Limpo Paulista
Campo Limpo Paulista	CLP	Side platforms	At-grade	Campo Limpo Paulista Bus Terminal; Campo Limpo Paulista Road Terminal	Campo Limpo Paulista
Várzea Paulista	VPL	Side platforms	At-grade	-	Várzea Paulista
Jundiaí	JUN	Side platforms	At-grade	Touristic Express	Jundiaí
