= Jundiaí (CPTM) =

Railway station in São Paulo, Brazil

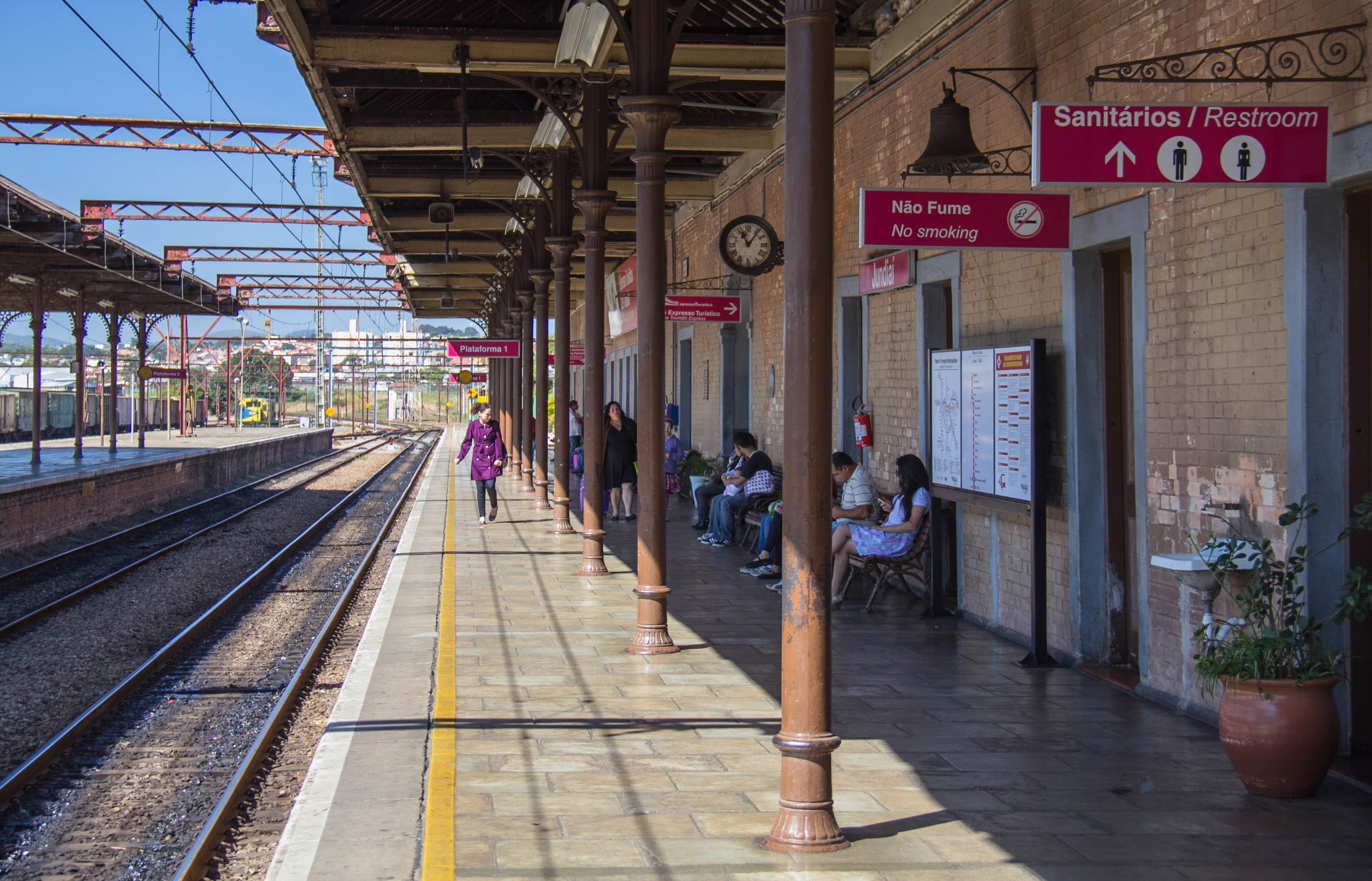
- Platform of the station.

General information
- Location: Av. União dos Ferroviários, s/n Ponte de Campinas; Brazil
- Coordinates: 23.195083°S 46.872429°W
- Owner: Government of the State of São Paulo
- Operator: TIC Trens (Grupo Comporte)
- Platforms: 1 island platform 1 side platform
- Connections: São Paulo–Jundiaí Touristic Express

Construction
- Structure type: At-grade

Other information
- Station code: JUN

History
- Opened: 16 February 1867
- Rebuilt: 1880s–1890s
- Former names: Jundiahy

Services
Preceding station	São Paulo Metropolitan Trains	Following station
Terminus	Line 7	Várzea Paulista towards Palmeiras-Barra Funda
Terminus	Touristic Express	Luz Terminus
Track layout
Location

Jundiaí is a train station on TIC Trens Line 7-Ruby, located in the district of Vila Arens in Jundiaí.

In the future, it should attend the Intercities Train line between Americana and Santos, being the first station with interchange to the railroad system of São Paulo.

== History ==
Jundiaí station was opened by São Paulo Railway on 16 February 1867. At the beginning of the 1870s, with the construction of the Companhia Paulista de Estradas de Ferro trunk line from Jundiaí to Campinas, the station was its start point of the line, serving as a connection station between both SPR and Paulista lines. Since 1994, it's operated by CPTM and part of the Line 7-Ruby Operational Extension.

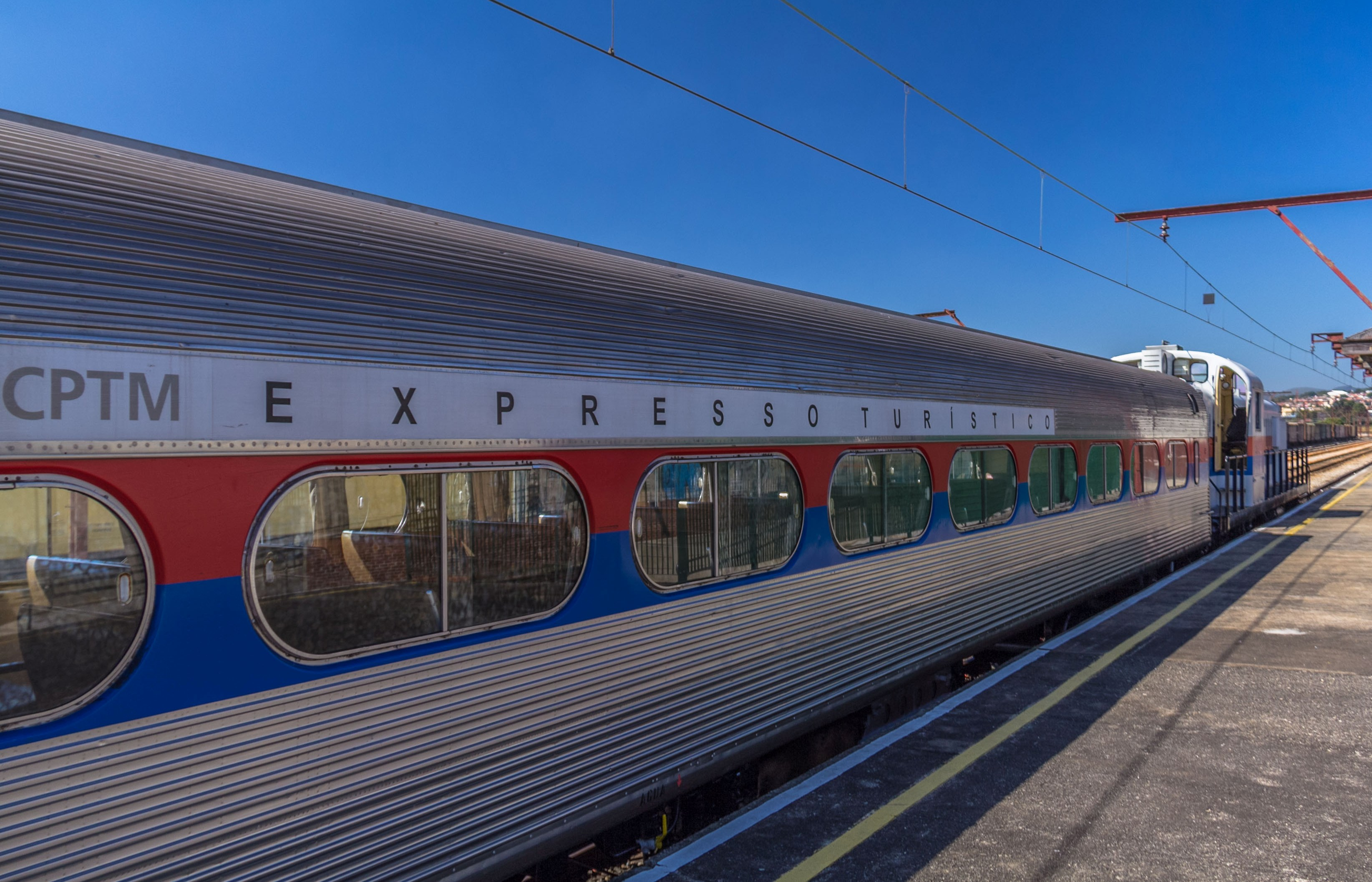
Jundiaí rail station and CPTM Touristic Express

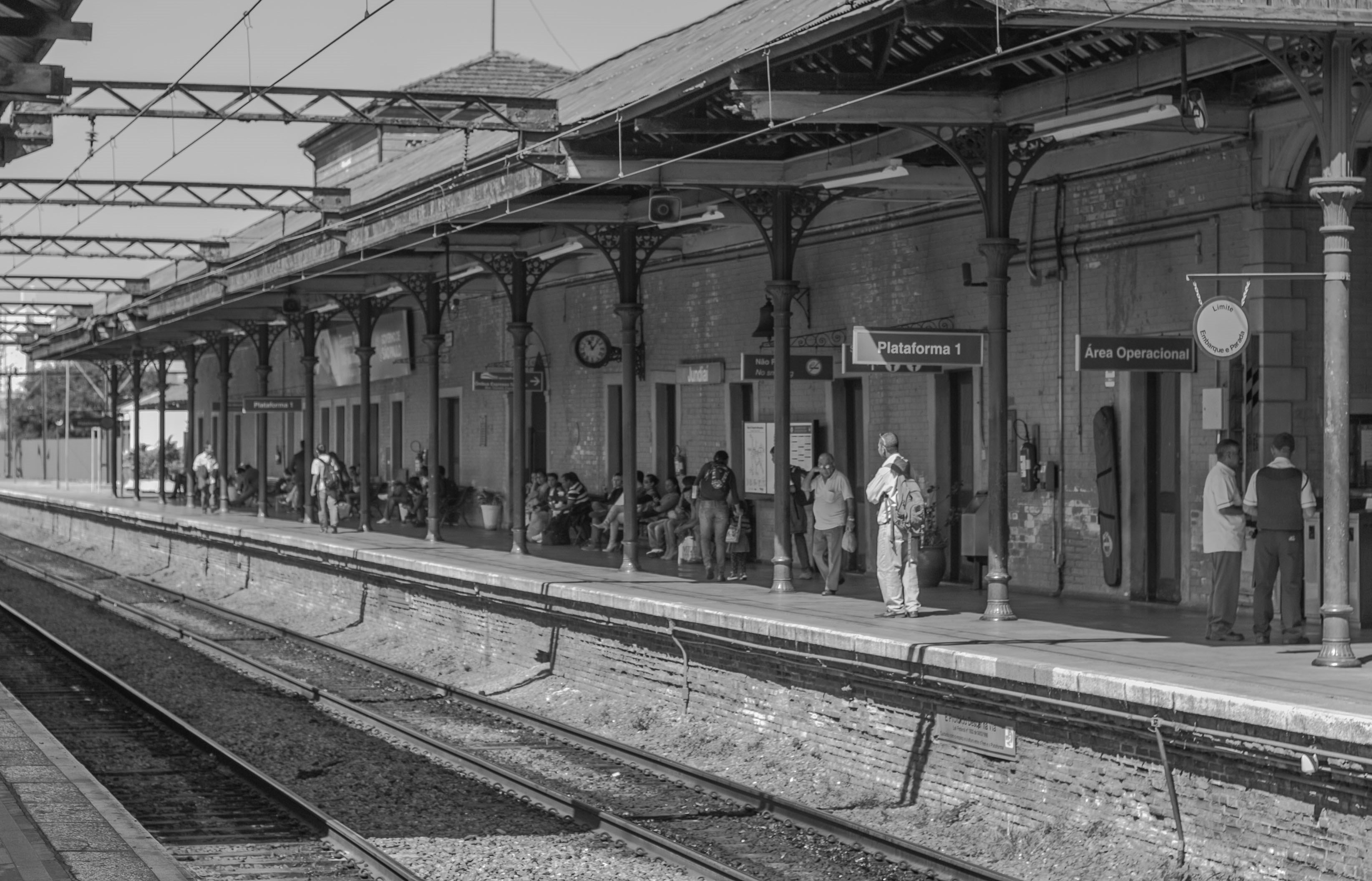
Platform of the station

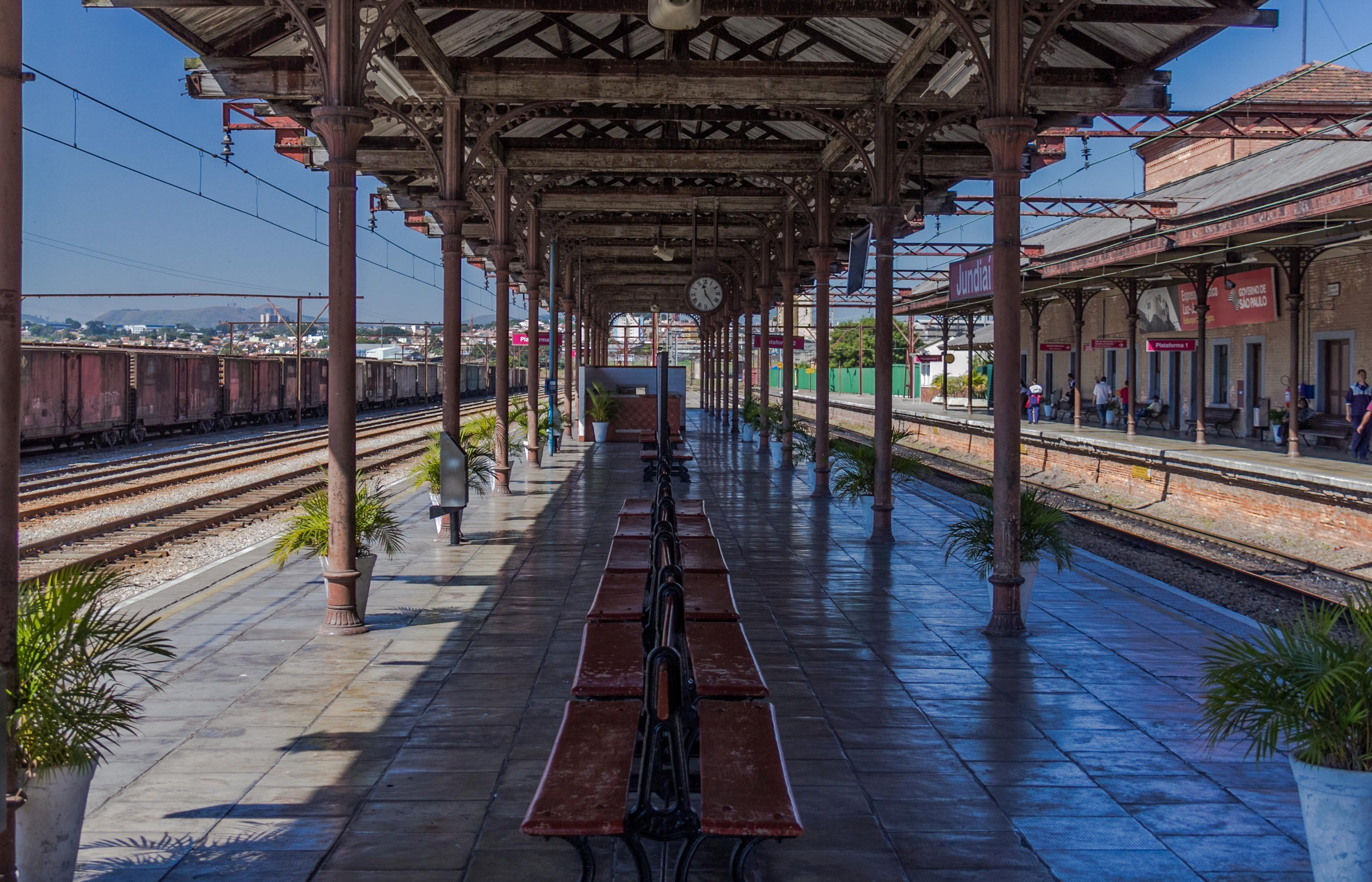
Island platform and cargo trains parked next to the station on the left

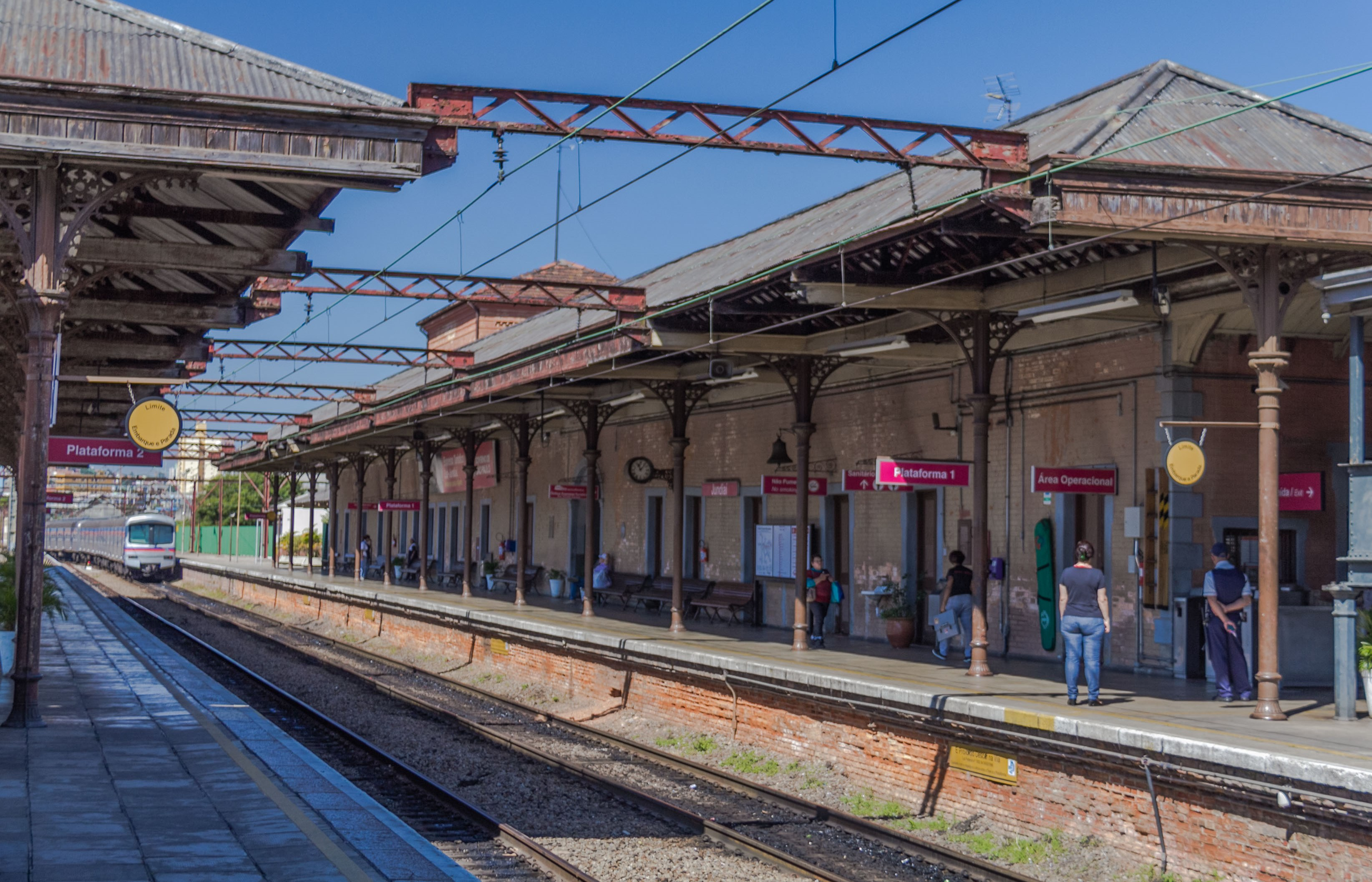
Train approaching the station

	Disused railways	
Horto; Deactivated toward Colômbia	Trunk line Companhia Paulista de Estradas de Ferro	Terminus
Terminus	Trunk line The São Paulo Railway Company	Várzea toward Santos
Ermida; Deactivated toward Itu	Trunk line Companhia Ytuana de Estradas de Ferro	Terminus
Terminus	Line A (Brown); CPTM	Várzea Paulista toward Luz
Terminus	Service 710; CPTM	Várzea Paulista toward Rio Grande da Serra
