= Palmeiras-Barra Funda (CPTM) =

Railway station in São Paulo, Brazil

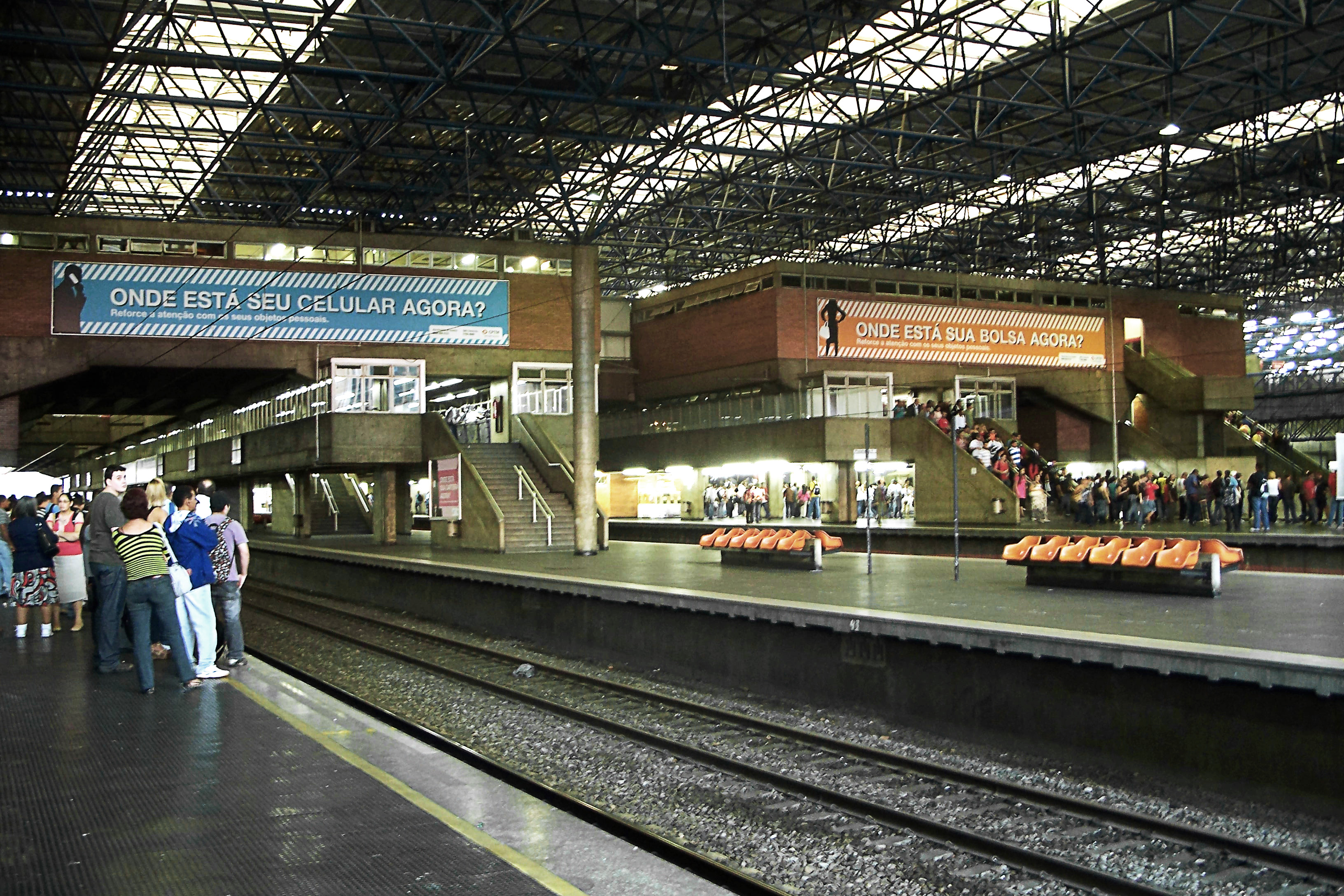
- Platform that, until 2011, attended CPTM Line 7-Ruby. Photo by Alexandre Giesbrecht.

General information
- Location: Av. Mário de Andrade, 664; Barra Funda; Brazil
- Coordinates: 23.525556°S 46.667222°W
- Owner: Government of the State of São Paulo
- Operator: CPTM; TIC Trens (Grupo Comporte); ViaMobilidade Linhas 8 e 9 (Motiva)
- Platforms: Island platforms
- Connections: Barra Funda Bus Terminal; Barra Funda Road Terminal

Construction
- Structure type: At-grade

Other information
- Station code: BFU

History
- Opened: 10 July 1875; 151 years ago (EFS); 19 May 1892; 134 years ago (SPR)
- Rebuilt: 17 December 1988; 37 years ago
- Former names: Barra Funda

Services
Preceding station	São Paulo Metropolitan Trains	Following station
Água Branca towards Jundiaí	Line 7	Terminus
Lapa towards Amador Bueno	Line 8	Júlio Prestes Terminus
Terminus	Line 10	Luz towards Rio Grande da Serra
Terminus	Line 11	Luz towards Estudantes
Terminus	Line 13-Airport Express	Luz towards Aeroporto–Guarulhos
Out-of-system interchange
Preceding station	São Paulo Metro	Following station
Terminus	Line 3 transfer at Palmeiras–Barra Funda	Marechal Deodoro towards Corinthians-Itaquera
Track layout
Location

Palmeiras-Barra Funda, also known only as Barra Funda, is a train station on CPTM lines 10-Turquoise, 11-Coral and 13-Jade (Airport Express), TIC Trens Line 7-Ruby and ViaMobilidade Linhas 8 e 9 Line 8-Diamond, in the district of Barra Funda in São Paulo.

== History ==
The first railway to open a station in Barra Funda was the Estrada de Ferro Sorocabana, on 10 July 1875. On 19 May 1892, São Paulo Railway opened their station, a few meter ahead, after Viaduto Pacaembu. The stations were isolated from each other. The idea of integration between the suburban trains and Metro began in the 1980s.

The current station was built by the São Paulo Metro with resources from the State and Federal Governments, in the location of the old Estrada de Ferro Sorocabana station, to attend the East-West Line (current Line 3-Red) and unify in only one station the FEPASA and CBTU commuter trains. During the construction, in May 1986, a favela was displaced, which was located onder the adjacent Viaduto Antártica, paying Cz$ 6,000 for each family. Despite the amount paid, the families chose to invade a land in Alto da Lapa, which was considered the first municipal land invasion during Jânio Quadros administration.

The station was opened on 17 December 1988, only with Metro and FEPASA lines. CBTU line was transferred only on 5 January 1989.

After the unification of the FEPASA and CBTU commuter train line as CPTM, a free interchange between the old companies' lines began.

On 27 April 2006, the Metro station was renamed to Palmeiras-Barra Funda, a tribute to Sociedade Esportiva Palmeiras, a São Paulo soccer club headquartered 750 metres (2,460 ft) away from the terminal. The same happened to the CPTM station in 2007.

== Station layout ==
M	Concourse	Fare control, ticket office, customer service, Bilhete Único/TOP recharge machines, transfer to
P Platform level
P Platform level	Northeastbound	toward Aeroporto–Guarulhos →
P Platform level	Island platform, doors open on the left and right
P Platform level	Eastbound	toward Estudantes →
P Platform level	Island platform, doors open on the left and right
P Platform level	Eastbound	toward Estudantes →
P Platform level	Southeastbound	toward Rio Grande da Serra →
P Platform level	Island platform, doors open on the right
P Platform level	Northwestbound	← toward Jundiaí
P Platform level		← No regular service →
P Platform level	Island platform, doors open on the left and right
P Platform level	Westbound	← toward Amador Bueno
P Platform level	Island platform, doors open on the left
P Platform level	Eastbound	toward Júlio Prestes →
