= TIC Trens =

Overview
- Main region: Greater São Paulo
- Fleet: 240 Hyundai Rotem 9500 Series (30 trains); 56 CRRC Intermetropolitan model (7 trains); 120 CRRC Intercity model (15 trains)
- Stations called at: 17
- Parent company: Grupo Comporte
- Headquarters: São Paulo
- Key people: Pedro Moro (Chairman)
- Dates of operation: 7 May 2024–present
- Predecessor: CPTM

Technical
- Track gauge: 1,600 mm (5 ft 3 in)
- Electrification: Overhead line, 3,000 V DC
- Length: 57 km (35 mi)
- Operating speed: 80 km/h (50 mph) (Line 7 and Intermetropolitan); 140 km/h (87 mph) (Intercity)

Other
- Website: www.tictrens.com.br

TIC Trens is a private rail transport company, headquartered in São Paulo, Brazil, and responsible for the operation of Line 7-Ruby of the São Paulo Metropolitan Trains system and the construction of the Northern Branch of Intercity Train, connecting São Paulo to Campinas, and the Intermetropolitan Train, connecting Jundiaí to Campinas, with stops in Valinhos, Louveira and Vinhedo.

It is controlled by Brazilian Grupo Comporte and Chinese CRRC, which came together to compete in the Intercity Train auction. The company operated CPTM Line 7 under supervision until full operation on 26 November 2025.

== Lines ==
Line	Color	Termini	Length	Stations
Line 7	Ruby	Palmeiras-Barra Funda ↔ Jundiaí	57 km (35 mi)	17

=== Future developments ===
Service	Termini	Length	Stations
Intercity	Água Branca ↔ Campinas	101 km (63 mi)	3
Intermetropolitan	Jundiaí ↔ Campinas	44.1 km (27.4 mi)	5

== See also ==
- Line 7 (CPTM)
- CRRC
