= São Paulo Metropolitan Trains =

Rapid transit system in São Paulo, Brazil

São Paulo Metropolitan Train

Overview
- Native name: Trem Metropolitano de São Paulo
- Owner: São Paulo State Government
- Area served: Greater São Paulo and Jundiaí, Brazil
- Transit type: Commuter rail, Rapid Transit
- Number of lines: 7
- Line number: Current: Planned:
- Number of stations: 99 (Note: The count of unique stations considers interchange stations only once, while the total station count is obtained by the sum of the stations of each line, including interchange stations more than once. Interchange stations are Osasco, Presidente Altino, Palmeiras–Barra Funda, Luz, Brás, Tatuapé, Engenheiro Goulart, and Calmon Viana. Details are available in the system table.)
- Daily ridership: 2.373 million - weekdays, entire network (2023); 1.573 million - weekdays, CPTM-operated lines (2023); 770 thousand - weekdays, ViaMobilidade-operated lines (2023)
- Annual ridership: 644.35 million - entire network (2023); 417.93 million - CPTM-operated lines (2023); 226.42 million - ViaMobilidade-operated lines (2023)
- Website: CPTM (in Portuguese); TIC Trens (in Portuguese); ViaMobilidade Linhas 8 e 9 (in Portuguese); Trivia Trens (in Portuguese)

Operation
- Began operation: 1889; 137 years ago
- Operators: Companhia Paulista de Trens Metropolitanos (Line 10); TIC Trens (Line 7); ViaMobilidade Linhas 8 e 9 (Lines 8 and 9); Trivia Trens (Lines 11–13)
- Headway: 10–28 minutes 35 minutes (weekends and holidays)

Technical
- System length: 281 km (175 mi); 382 km (237 mi) (complete network)
- Track gauge: 1,600 mm (5 ft 3 in)
- Electrification: Overhead line, 3,000 V DC
- Average speed: 60 km/h (37 mph)
- Top speed: 90 km/h (56 mph)
Network map
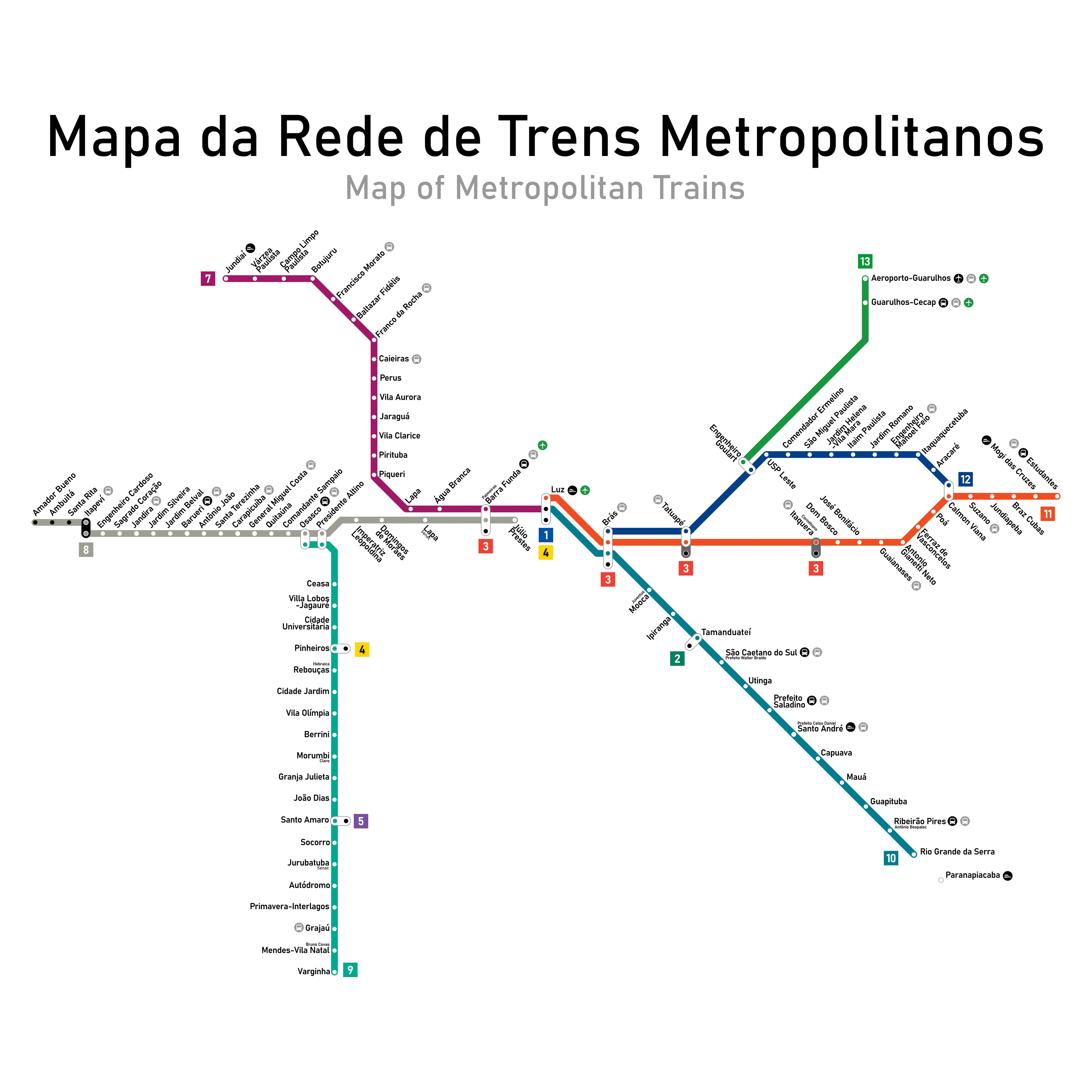

The São Paulo Metropolitan Train (Brazilian Portuguese: Trem Metropolitano de São Paulo) is a public railway system of commuter rail services operating in Greater São Paulo, serving 23 of its 39 municipalities. The system comprises 281 km (175 mi) of length, 7 lines and 100 unique (110 overall) stations, carrying around 3 million passengers on an average weekday.

Currently, it is operated by three different companies: one is the state-owned Companhia Paulista de Trens Metropolitanos (CPTM), which took over the lines formerly operated by the Companhia Brasileira de Trens Urbanos (CBTU) in 1994 and by FEPASA in 1996; the others are private: ViaMobilidade Linhas 8 e 9, which took over the former FEPASA lines under a concession granted by the São Paulo State Government and began operating lines 8 and 9 in January 2022; TIC Trens, which began operating line 7 on November 26, 2025, and will also be responsible for the Northern Corridor of the regional rail network service.

The São Paulo metropolitan rail network is the largest urban rail system in Brazil by route length and the country's second-busiest in terms of daily ridership, behind only the São Paulo Metro. It is integrated into the Metro system, composing a network of over 300 km (190 mi), making it the largest metropolitan rail transport network in Latin America.

== History ==
=== Origin of the lines ===
==== Federal railways ====
The history of railways in the state of São Paulo dates back to 1867 with the construction of the first link between the cities of Santos, São Paulo and Jundiaí by São Paulo Railway, inaugurated on 16 February 1867, which crossed the state plateau and going down the Serra do Mar. The first commuter train service on this railway dates back to 1883, between Pirituba and Pilar (Mauá) stations, gradually expanded over the years from Jundiaí to Paranapiacaba (shortened to Rio Grande da Serra in 2001), forming the current lines 7–Ruby and 10–Turquoise.

In the 1870s, the Companhia São Paulo e Rio de Janeiro build the Estrada de Ferro do Norte, a railway that connected São Paulo to the cities of the Paraíba Valley. In the 1890s, this railway was incorporated by Estrada de Ferro Central do Brasil (EFCB), connecting São Paulo to Rio de Janeiro. The commuter train service on this line was operated between do Norte and Mogi das Cruzes stations, constituting what is currently Line 11–Coral. In 1921, the EFCB began constructing a variant to the main trunk called the Poá Variant, between Tatuapé and Calmon Viana stations. The service started its operation in 1934 and it now comprises the entirety of Line 12–Sapphire.

In 1946, Estrada de Ferro Santos-Jundiaí, administered by the federal government, took over the railway, which corresponds to the current lines 7-Ruby and 10-Turquoise.

In 1957, the federal railway are unified into one state-owned company, Rede Ferroviária Federal (RFFSA), amongst them EFCB and Estrada de Ferro Santos-Jundiaí. RFFSA's commuter train operations throughout the country originated, in the 1970s, the Empresa Brasileira de Transporte Urbano (EBTU), merged in 1984 with the Empresa de Engenharia Ferroviária (ENGEFER), creating the Companhia Brasileira de Trens Urbanos (CBTU). In Greater São Paulo, CBTU was responsible for operating the northwest–southeast, East (also called Trunk) and Variant lines of the commuter train system.

==== State railways ====
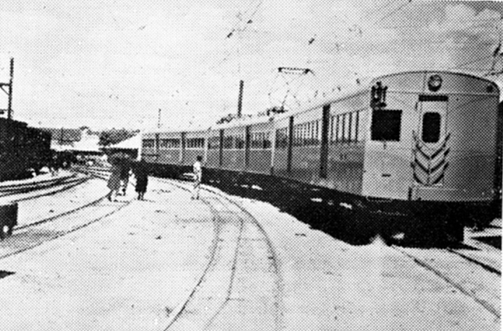
GE-Pullman train of Sorocabana, the first commuter train in São Paulo suburban area.

In 1875, the Sorocabana Railway was inaugurated, with a connection between the cities of São Paulo and Sorocaba, called the Trunk Line. The EFS was nationalized by the Government of São Paulo in 1919. In 1934, a commuter train service began operating between São Paulo and Mairinque stations (and later shortened to Amador Bueno), constituting what is today Line 8–Diamond.

After Sorocabana was incorporated by FEPASA in 1971, the Regional Unit of the Suburbs was created, later renamed to Metropolitan Regional Direction. It was a division that managed passenger transportation within the metropolitan areas of the state of São Paulo. In Greater São Paulo, it was responsible for operating the West and South lines of the commuter rail system.

=== Operations in the second half of the 20th century ===
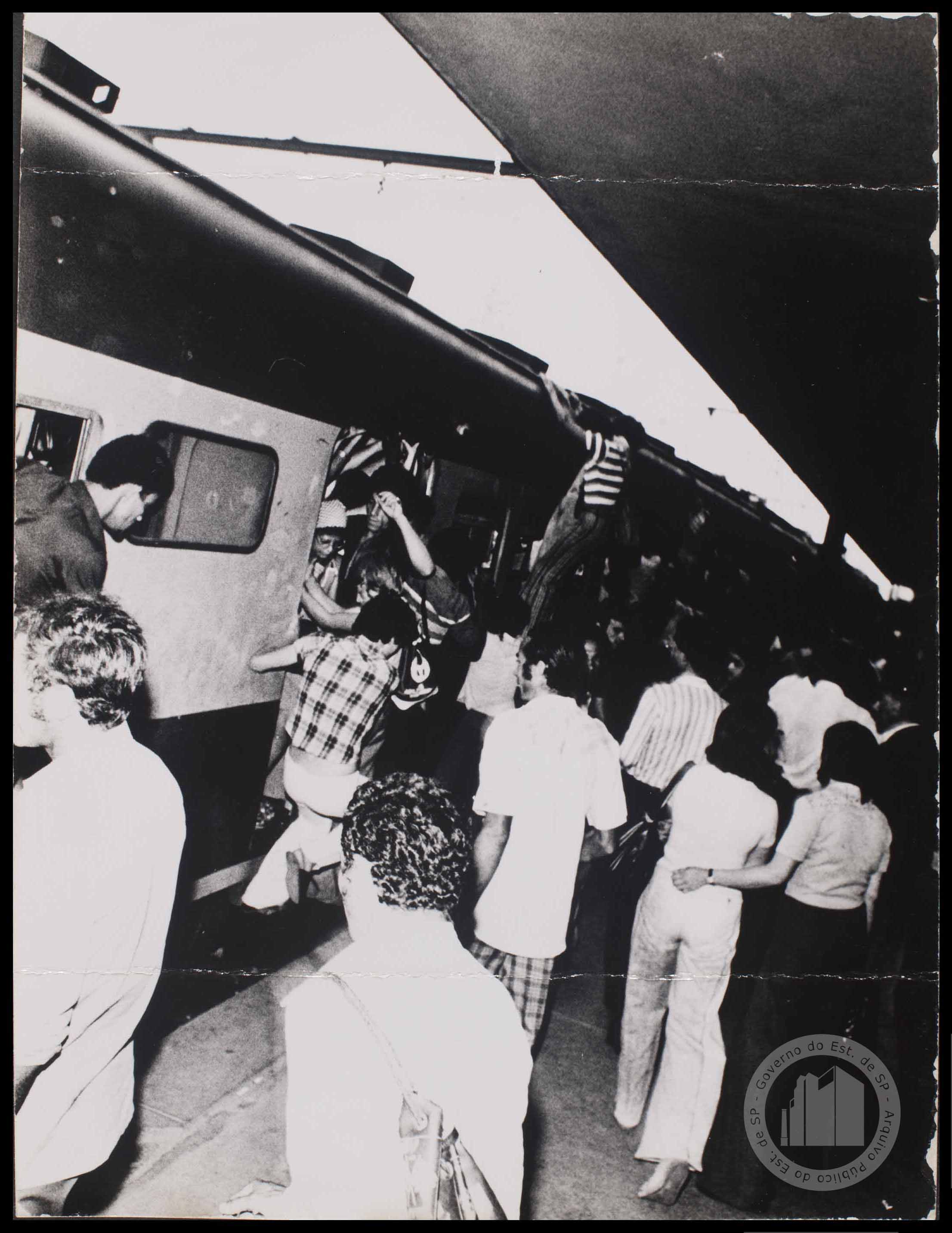
Commuters boarding an overcrowded train at the Osasco station in the 1970s.

From 1975 to 1980, FEPASA/DRM developed a great plan of remodeling of the suburbs trains, transformed into metropolitan trains (West and South Lines). Yet, the economic crisis jeopardized the investments and delayed the projects implementations.

At the same time, the suburban trains operated by RFFSA (Lines Santos-Jundiaí, Tronco Mogi and Variante Poá) received modest investments. With that, breakdowns and riots were common, with commuters promoting vandalism in stations, trains and other railway facilities. In 1972, during the discussion of the project of East-West Line, the Metro proposed the transfer of Tronco-Mogi Line and its conversion into a metropolitan train, proposed rejected by RFFSA.

Even with the transfer of the suburban lines from RFFSA to the recently created CBTU, the precariousness of the urban trains administered by the federal government reached a peak in 1987 with the Itaquera rail crash. Caused by the lack of investments and maintenance failures, the accident caused the death of 51 passengers. On 30 April 1987, the state government and the Ministry of Transports signed an intention protocol for the transfer of CBTU East Line-Mogi to the Metro administration. The cost of the transfer and conversion of the line into metropolitan train was of US$ 350 million (almost Cz$ 9 billion) for the state. During 1987, the state government negotiated with the federal government. The lack of state funds and lack of interest of CBTU in the transfer (the company proposed to the state government a shared operation of the lines among CBTU, RFFSA and Metrô) blocked the continuation of the project, besides it was the first step of the acquisition of the network by the state government years later.

==== Creation of CPTM and complete state takeover ====
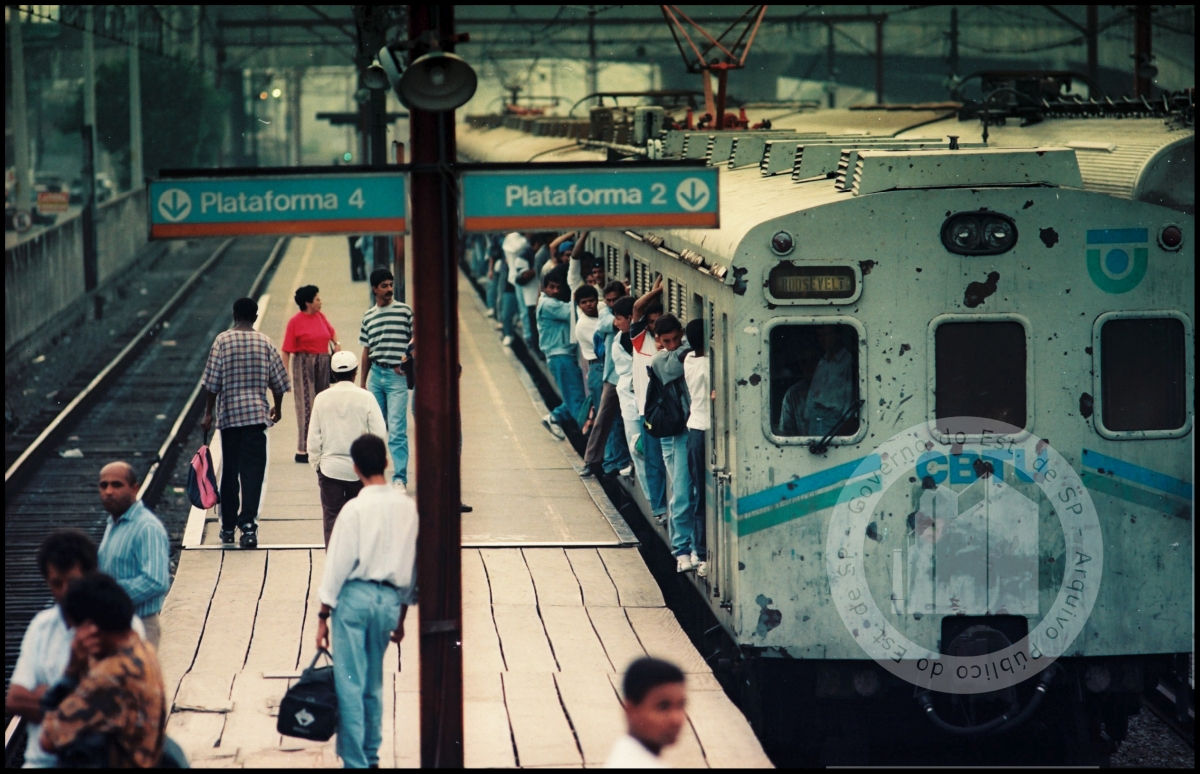
Engenheiro Sebastião Gualberto station of East Line-Mogi right after being transferred to CPTM in 1994. The station was deactivated years later and its surroundings are now served by Carrão station of the Line 3 of the São Paulo Metro.

On May 28, 1992, through Law No. 7,861, the São Paulo government created the Companhia Paulista de Trens Metropolitanos (CPTM), which would be responsible for assuming management of the commuter train system in the São Paulo Metropolitan Region, replacing CBTU's São Paulo Urban Trains Superintendency (STU/SP) and Fepasa DRM, to ensure continuity and improvement of services. Effective control of the lines belonging to CBTU occurred only in 1994. The Fepasa lines were incorporated into CPTM in 1996, at the same time the company's freight railway network was transferred to RFFSA, being subsequently privatized along with the company's entire railway system around the country.

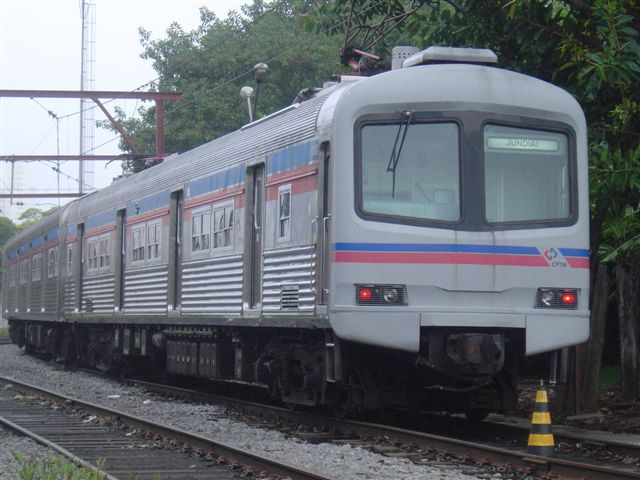
EMU 1100 Series with the first CPTM color scheme in 2006

CPTM established a new visual communication for the system, adopting a silver livery with blue and red details for the trains, replacing the blue and green on CBTU rolling stock and the red and white of Fepasa compositions. The lines also gained a new naming convention, replacing regions with letters and colors. The CBTU's Northwest, Southeast, East and Variant lines were renamed A–Brown, D–Bege, E–Orange and F–Violet, and Fepasa's West and South lines became B–Grey and C–Celestial.

=== Expansion and modernization ===
At the beginning of CPTM's management, the frequent occurrence of breakdowns, sexual harassment, street vending, strikes, train surfing, among other problems, led some passengers to cause a series of depredations at trains and stations from September 30 to October 16, 1996, causing the interruption of services on the then Line A–Brown for six months. Due to having such an extensive and degraded railway network, CPTM began modernizing its systems, investing 1.5 billion dollars in the network between 1995 and 2004.

Early construction works began in 1998 for the then-called Line G–Lilac, which had been planned for years by Fepasa as the Campo Limpo Branch. The section between Largo Treze and Capão Redondo, in the south zone of São Paulo, required the construction of 7.5 kilometres (4.7 mi) of elevated tracks, 1 km (0.62 miles) of at-grade tracks, and 850 m (2,790 feet) of underground tracks, as well as a maintenance and switching yard in Capão Redondo. However, the section was handed over in 2001 to the São Paulo Metro in exchange for the Expresso Leste, built by CMSP. The shortcut between Corinthians-Itaquera and Guaianases led to the extinction of the "trunk line" layout that went through the Itaquera district (current José Pinheiro Borges Avenue route), as well as the shutdown several stations between Corinthians-Itaquera and Tatuapé. Following the handover, works began on Line 5 of the São Paulo Metro, which replaced the previous project and started operation in 2002.

In November 2006, the CPTM Operational Control Center (CCO) building was inaugurated in an area adjacent to Brás Station. Besides metropolitan trains, it also manages the circulation of freight trains on the sections where they share tracks with passenger trains. The CCO became responsible for the operation of the six lines of the system, which were previously commanded from different points.

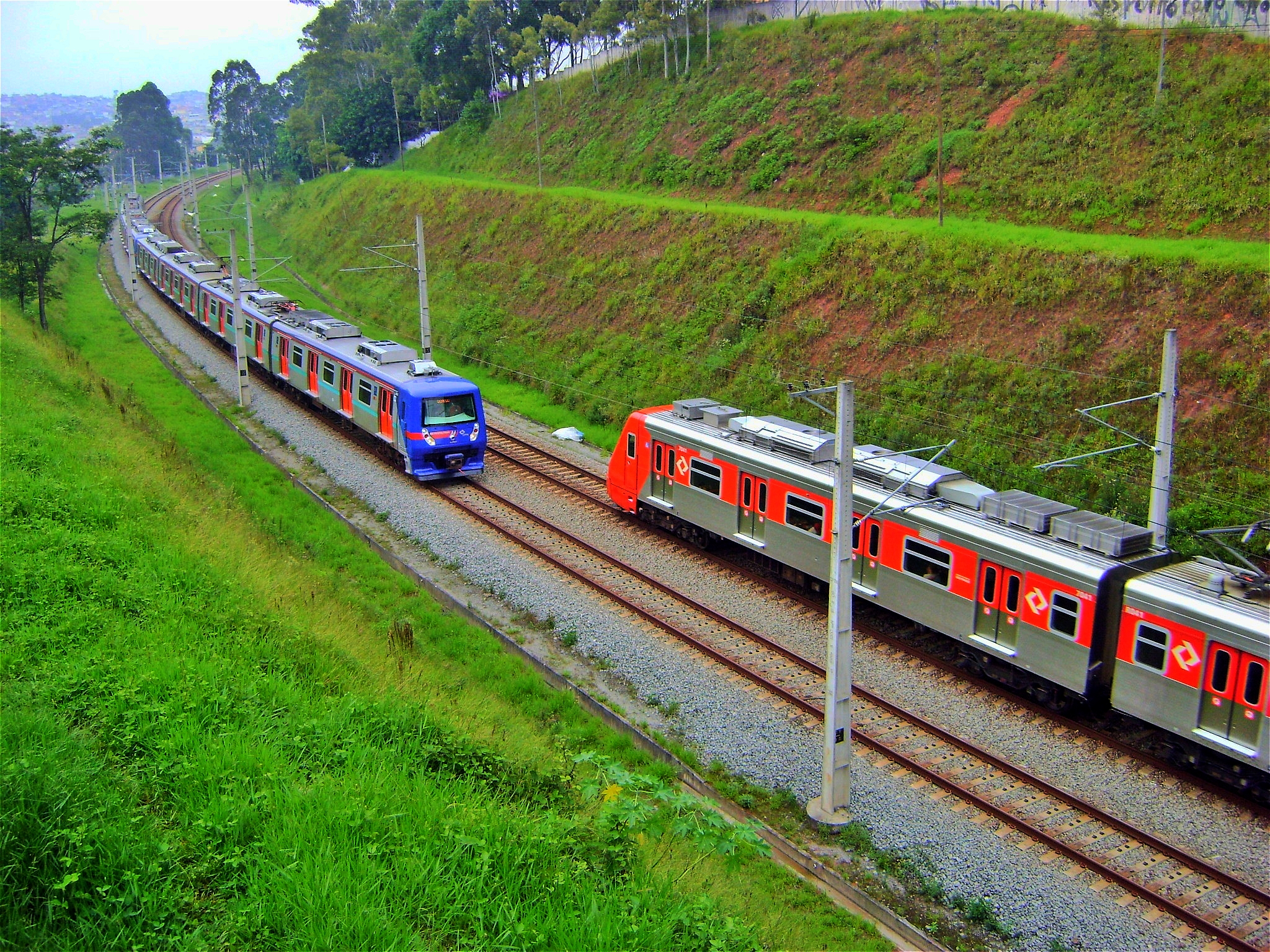
Train traffic of line 9 in the Cidade Dutra district, São Paulo, 2011.

In March 2008, the nomenclature of the lines belonging to the train system was unified with the scheme used by the Metro. Each line was assigned a number (starting from 7) and the name of a gemstone. Thus, lines A–Brown, B–Grey, C–Celestial, D–Bege, E–Orange and F–Violet became 7–Ruby, 8–Diamond, 9–Emerald, 10–Turquoise, 11–Coral and 12–Sapphire.

In December 2013, construction began on the Guarulhos Branch, renamed Line 13–Jade. Phase I was defined with 12.2 km (7.6 miles) of extension and three stations (Engenheiro Goulart, Guarulhos-Cecap and Aeroporto–Guarulhos). On March 31, 2018, the first phase of the line was inaugurated, the first to be entirely built and operated by CPTM.

=== Concession of system lines ===
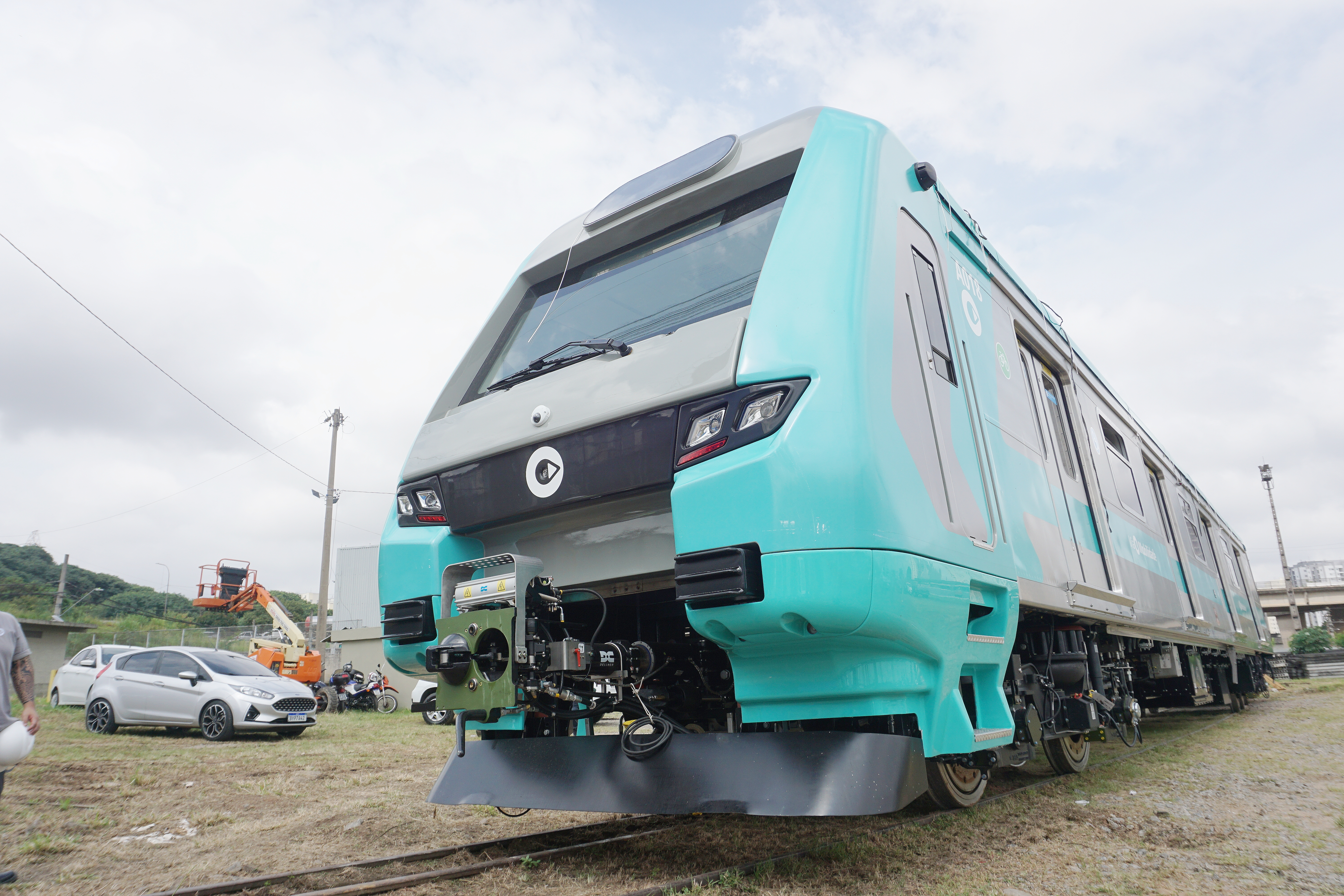
ViaMobilidade Series 8900 with standard ViaMobilidade colors, 2023

The first official attempt at a concession for Metropolitan Train lines to the private sector occurred in 1999, during the Mário Covas government, when the intention to privatize CPTM lines by 2001 was announced, with the state-owned company retaining only the Barra Funda-Brás section.

In April 2001, the Geraldo Alckmin government announced its plans to award concessions for four of the six lines (Lines A, B, D, and F) and to merge CPTM with CMSP, which would then operate Lines C and E. Despite the concession proposal, the state government guaranteed that it would provide funding for the restoration of the rail network covered by the concession.

No company will agree to it unless that’s the case. The system doesn’t generate enough revenue to cover operating and maintenance costs and investments. The government’s role is to always invest, regardless of whether the project is in the hands of the private sector.

— Claudio de Senna Frederico, then state secretary of Metropolitan Transportation, interview to Folha de S.Paulo, published on April 23, 2001

The project was eventually shelved. The next proposal for the concession of the lines came from Triunfo Participações e Investimentos S/A, which published a Private Expression of Interest (MIP) for the concession of Lines 8 and 9. Triunfo's proposal served as the basis for drafting the call for bids for the concession of Lines 8 and 9, initiated by the João Doria administration. Despite expectations that several domestic and foreign companies would participate (Triunfo, the author of the MIP, entered into judicial reorganization, claiming this was one of the effects of Operation Car Wash, and withdrew from the process), the following proposals were submitted:

- ViaMobilidade Lines 8 and 9 (Motiva and RuasInvest) – concession fee of R$ 980,000,000.00
- Mobitrens (Comporte, Líder, Consbem, and CAF) – concession fee of R$ 787,737,800.00
- Integração (Iberica Holding and Metra) – concession of R$ 519,500,000.00
- Itapemirim and Encalso Mobility Rail (Itapemirim and Encalso Construções) – concession of R$ 400,000,000.00

Following the state's review, ViaMobilidade's bid was declared the winner on April 20, 2021, with a concession fee of 890 million reais. The concession contract for Lines 8 and 9 was signed on June 30, 2021 and operations were transferred to the concessionaire on January 27, 2022.

== System ==
=== Lines ===
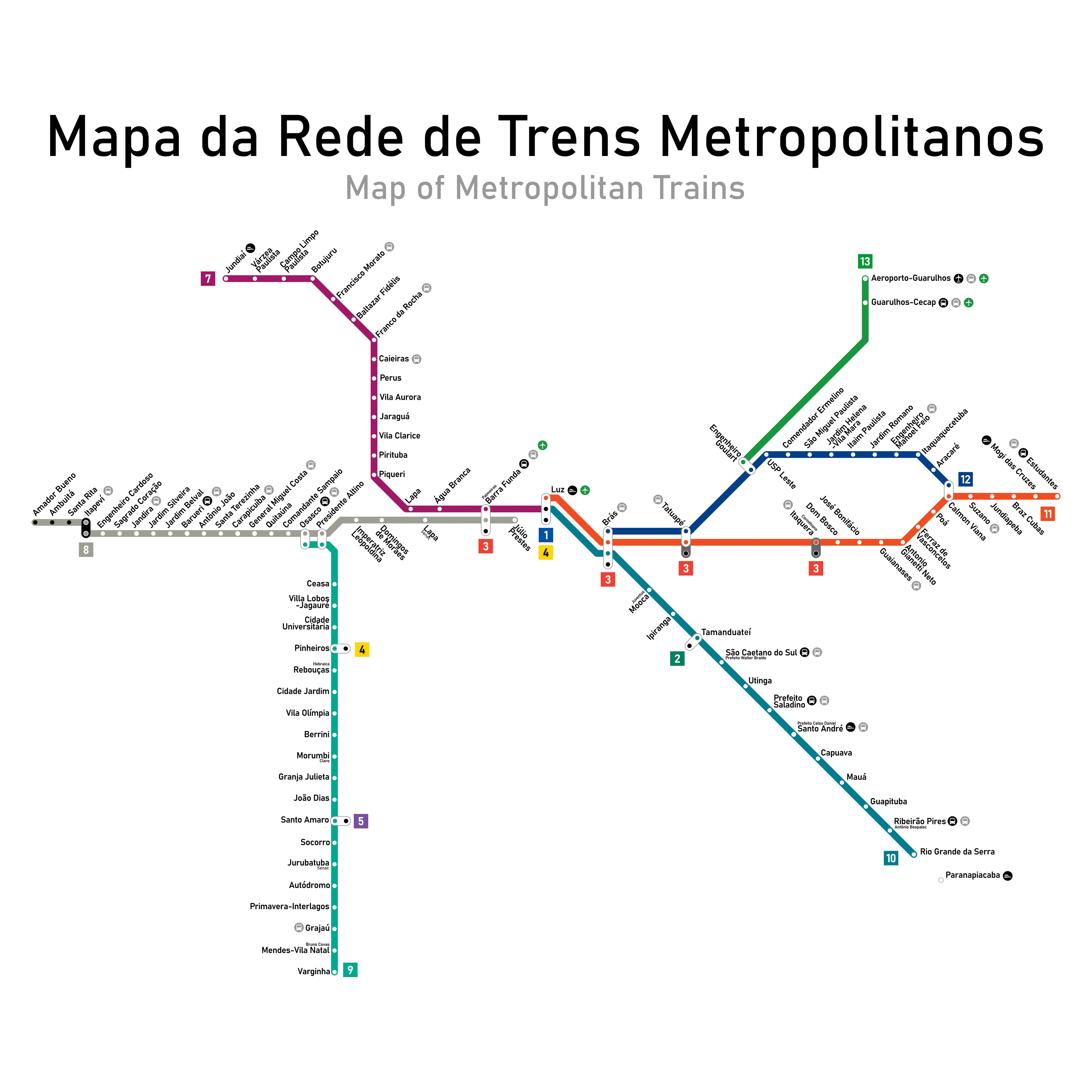
System Map - April 2025

Line	Color	Termini	Opened	Hours of Operation	Length	Stations	Notes
Line 7	Ruby	Jundiaí ↔ Palmeiras-Barra Funda	16 February 1867	Daily (4:00 AM–12:00 AM)	62.7 km (39.0 mi)	17	Former northwestern section of the CBTU Northwest-Southeast Line and Line A–Brown; The transfer station in Francisco Morato was officially closed on September 19, 2020.
Line 8	Diamond	Júlio Prestes ↔ Amador Bueno	10 July 1875	Daily (4:00 AM–12:00 AM)	41.6 km (25.8 mi)	23	Former Fepasa West Line and Line B–Gray; The section between Itapevi and Amador Bueno is considered an operational extension and requires a transfer at Itapevi.
Line 9	Emerald	Osasco ↔ Varginha	25 January 1957	Daily (4:00 AM–12:00 AM)	37.3 km (23.2 mi)	21	Former Fepasa South Line and Line C–Celeste.
Line 10	Turquoise	Palmeiras-Barra Funda ↔ Rio Grande da Serra	16 February 1867	Daily (4:00 AM–12:00 AM)	35 km (22 mi)	15	Former southeastern section of the CBTU Northwest-Southeast Line and the Line D–Beige; It offers express service.
Line 11	Coral	Palmeiras-Barra Funda ↔ Estudantes	1890	Daily (4:00 AM–12:00 AM)	54.1 km (33.6 mi)	17	Former CBTU East Line (Main Line) and Line E–Orange; The transfer station in Guaianases was officially closed on April 9, 2019.
Line 12	Sapphire	Brás ↔ Calmon Viana	1 April 1934	Daily (4:00 AM–12:00 AM)	38.8 km (24.1 mi)	13	Former CBTU Branch Line and F–Violet Line.
Line 13	Jade	Engenheiro Goulart ↔ Aeroporto-Guarulhos	31 March 2018	Daily (4:00 AM–12:00 AM)	12.2 km (7.6 mi)	3	It offers express service (see below).
Total in operation:			286.9	109 total stations			

==== Express services ====
Line	Service	Termini	Length	Stations
Line 10	Line 10 Express	Tamanduateí ↔ Prefeito Celso Daniel-Santo André	9.3 km (5.8 mi)	3
Line 13	Airport Express	Palmeiras-Barra Funda ↔ Aeroporto-Guarulhos	31.1 km (19.3 mi)	5

==== Former services ====
Line	Service	Termini	Length	Stations
Line 7	Service 710	Jundiaí ↔ Rio Grande da Serra	101.7 km (63.2 mi)	32
Line 10	Service 710	Jundiaí ↔ Rio Grande da Serra	101.7 km (63.2 mi)	32
Line 10	Line 10+ Express	Luz ↔ Prefeito Celso Daniel-Santo André	17.7 km (11.0 mi)	5
Line 13	Connect	Brás ↔ Aeroporto-Guarulhos	25.2 km (15.7 mi)	5

==== Under development ====
Line	Color	Termini	Length	Stations	Start of construction	Completion (forecast)	Current status
Line 11	Coral	Penha	—N/a	1	2020	2027	Under construction

==== Planned ====
Line	Color	Termini	Length	Stations	Current status
Line 8	Diamond	Água Branca	—N/a	1	In project
Line 9	Emerald (Expansion)	Ceasa ↔ Água Branca	—N/a	4	In project
Line 10	Turquoise	Bom Retiro	—N/a	1	
Line 10	Turquoise	Cerealista	—N/a	1	
Line 10	Turquoise	Parque da Mooca	—N/a	1	
Line 10	Turquoise	ABC	—N/a	1	In project
Line 11	Coral (Expansion)	Estudantes ↔ César de Sousa	4.3 km (2.7 mi)	1	In project
Line 11	Coral	Bom Retiro	—N/a	1	In project
Line 11	Coral	Cerealista	—N/a	1	
Line 11	Coral	Lajeado	—N/a	1	In project
Line 12	Sapphire (Expansion)	Calmon Viana ↔ Suzano	2.6 km (1.6 mi)	1	
Line 12	Sapphire	Gabriela Mistral	—N/a	1	
Line 12	Sapphire	Cangaíba	—N/a	1	
Line 12	Sapphire	União de Vila Nova	—N/a	1	In project
Line 13	Jade (Expansion)	Aeroporto-Guarulhos ↔ Bonsucesso	10.5 km (6.5 mi)	4	In project
Line 13	Jade (Expansion)	Engenheiro Goulart ↔ Gabriela Mistral	4.3 km (2.7 mi)	2	
Line 14	Onyx	Bonsucesso ↔ Jardim Irene	39 km (24 mi)	23	In project
Line 24	Quartz	Santana de Parnaíba ↔ Campo Limpo	34 km (21 mi)	21	In project
Line 25	Topaz	Embu das Artes ↔ ABC	43 km (27 mi)	25	In project
Line 26	Amethyst	Sanazar ↔ Imperador	41 km (25 mi)	23	In project

=== Rolling stock ===
The metropolitan trains rolling stock has trains of 19 different series, some of them out of service for being older, and some of them recently delivered.

=== Signaling ===
==== Centralized Traffic Control (1960–2010) ====
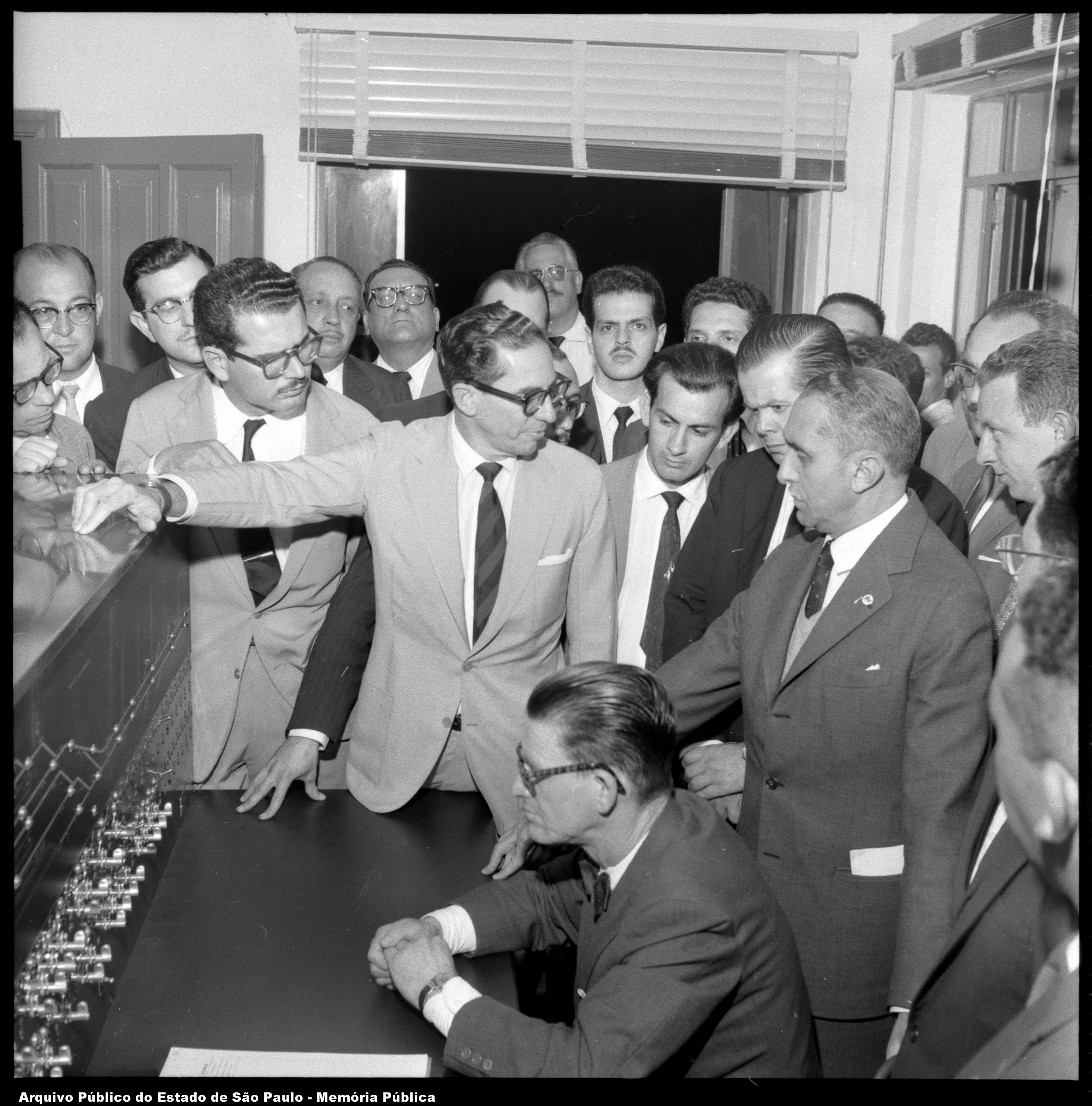
Carvalho Pinto, Governor of São Paulo, and the São Paulo Secretary of Transportation, Faria Lima, at the inauguration of the CTC system at Sorocabana Railway in September 1960

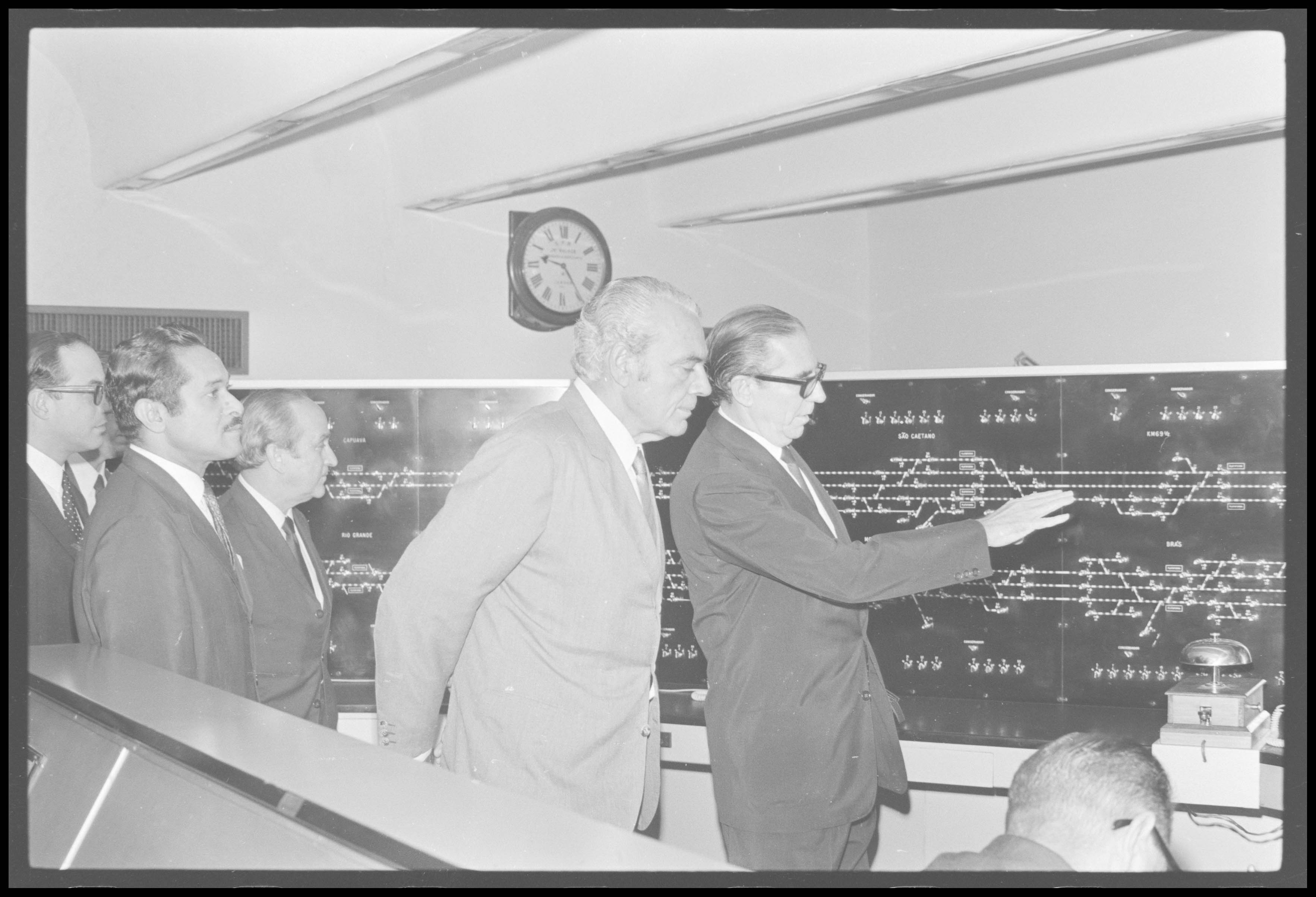
Minister of Transport Mário Andreazza and Secretary of Transport Paulo Maluf inaugurate the CTC system of the Santos–Jundiaí Railway on the plateau section in April 1971.

Following World War II and the growth of passenger traffic, railway companies began studying signaling improvements to cope with the increasing volume of train traffic. Following the creation of the Brazil–United States Joint Commission for Economic Development (CMBEU) in 1951, public railways sought funding from the newly established BNDE to modernize their networks. In 1952, the Sorocabana Railway sought loans from the recently founded BNDE to modernize the railway. In a report by BNDE auditor Pércio Reis (1914–1978), it was suggested that Sorocabana adopt Automatic Train Control (ATC) on the 140-kilometer section between São Paulo and Iperó and Centralized Traffic Control (CTC) on the rest of the company's network. The estimated cost of implementing ATC was 23 million cruzeiros.

Despite the report, Sorocabana postponed signaling investments until the late 1950s. In February 1959, Sorocabana secured a US$ 8.3 million loan from Eximbank and allocated part of these resources to the implementation of the CTC system across its network, including the São Paulo–Iperó section. The equipment was imported from Union Switch & Signal and installed in Brazil by Companhia Brasileira de Sinalização, owned by Hélio de Almeida. The first section, between Júlio Prestes and Barra Funda, was inaugurated by Governor Carvalho Pinto on September 15, 1960. The São Paulo–Iperó section started operating on September 27, 1962.

At the time, Sorocabana's suburban trains were the only ones controlled by a then modern signaling system. Sorocabana's investment encouraged the Central do Brasil Railway to begin implementing CTC on the Poá Variant in 1962. Its inauguration occurred in 1966. In 1967, installation of CTC began on the Engineer Gualberto–Mogi das Cruzes section. Work on the Central do Brasil suburban network was completed in 1971. The final section was inaugurated on April 11, 1973.

The Santos-Jundiaí Railway had imported equipment for the implementation of CTC many years earlier, but only began installing the system in 1962. After the inauguration of the first section between Santos and Piaçaguera in March 1963, the project was halted. In 1967, work resumed under Rede Ferroviária Federal. The Santos–Jundiaí Railway CTC system was finally completed on April 29, 1971.

Even after signaling modernization during the 1970s and 1980s through the implementation of ATC, CTC remained in operation on the Metropolitan Train system until April 30, 2010, when the final section (Itapevi–Amador Bueno) was decommissioned after forty-nine years of operation.

Implementation of Centralized Traffic Control on the Metropolitan Train
Line	Inauguration date
Itapevi – Julio Prestes	September 15, 1960
Osasco – Varginha	September 27, 1962
Luz – Francisco Morato	April 29, 1971
Luz – Rio Grande da Serra	April 29, 1971
Luz – Estudantes	1971
Brás – Calmon Viana	1966

==== Automatic Train Control (ATC) ====
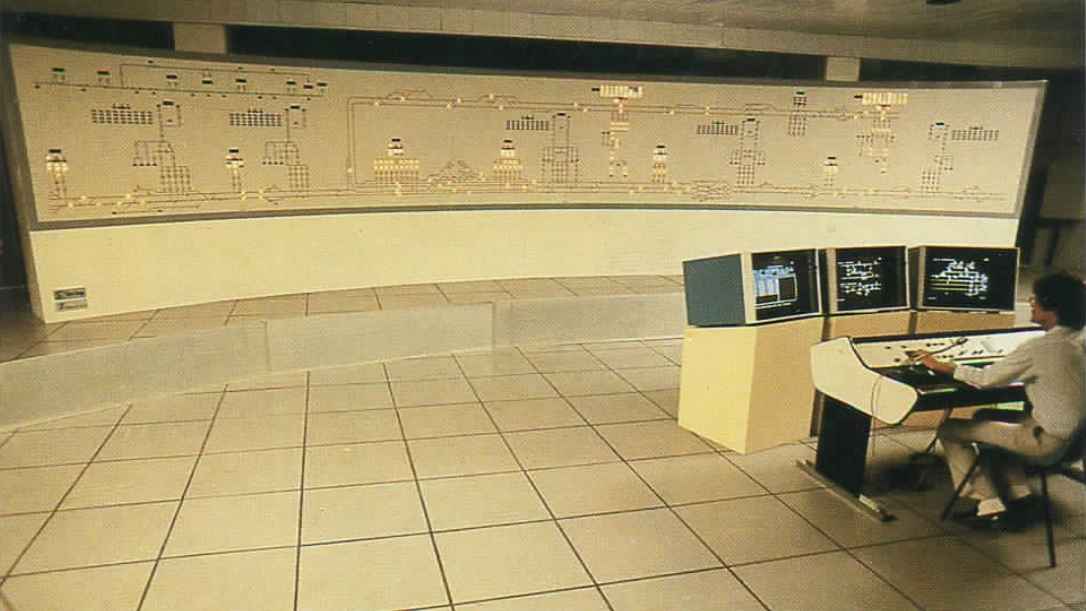
View of the Fepasa Metropolitan Train Operational Control Center, 1985.

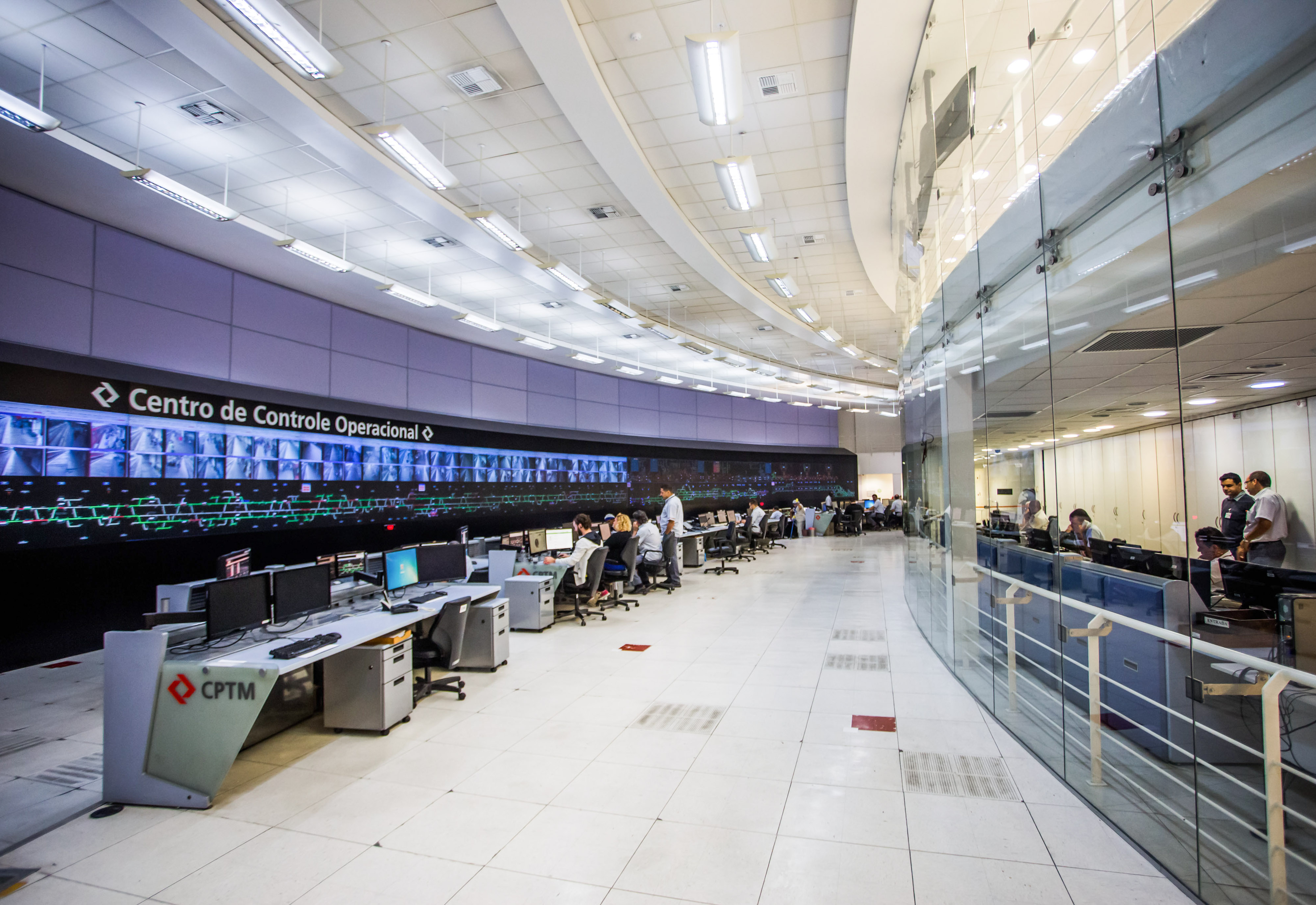
The system's Operational Control Center, 2016.

With the growth of train and passenger traffic during the 1970s, the CTC signalling system used on São Paulo's suburban railways proved insufficient. In 1975, Fepasa (the successor to the Sorocabana Railway) began its suburban modernization plan and announced the procurement of an Automatic Train Control (ATC) system for the Júlio Prestes–Itapevi and Osasco–Jurubatuba lines, costing US$ 23.2 million. Fepasa inaugurated its ATC system on November 10, 1986, initially covering the 22-kilometer section between Júlio Prestes and Carapicuíba. In April 1987, the ATC system was extended to the Osasco–Pinheiros section. ATC works were only completed in 1992, while the Itapevi–Amador Bueno section continued operating solely under the CTC system until 2010, when it was decommissioned and replaced by ATC.

At the same time, Rede Ferroviária Federal (successor to the Central do Brasil and Santos–Jundiaí railways) began commissioning and installing ATC on its lines. In 1979, the first Metropolitan Train section equipped with ATC started operating between Mogi das Cruzes and Engineer Sebastião Gualberto. ATC installation on Rede Ferroviária Federal lines continued until mid-1983. Nevertheless, CTC remained in use on the Brás–Calmon Viana line until the late 2000s.

As of 2025, signaling systems used on the São Paulo Metropolitan Train network are divided as follows:

- Automatic Train Control (ATC) – Lines 7, 8, 9, 10, 11 and 12.
- Automatic Train Operation (ATO) – Line 13; Lines 8 (under installation), 9 (under installation), and 12 (under installation).
- CBTC – Line 8 (suspended), and Lines 10 and 11 (under installation).

=== Ridership ===
==== 1944–1970 ====
Annual ridership on Metropolitan Trains by Railway Company (1944–1970)
Year	Total	Sorocabana (Note: The Sorocabana Railway began separating suburban and mainline passenger statistics in 1944. See Sistema integrado de transporte rápido coletivo da cidade de São Paulo, 1 : estudos sócioeconômicos de tráfego e de viabilidade econômico-financeira. 1 [Integrated Rapid Transit System for the City of São Paulo, Vol. 1: Socioeconomic Traffic and Financial Feasibility Studies] (in Brazilian Portuguese) (1st ed.). São Paulo PMSP. 1968. p. 88.)	Cantareira (Note: The Cantareira Railway was discontinued in 1965.)	Santos– Jundiaí	Central do Brasil (Note: N/A = Not available. In some statistical yearbooks, the suburban services of the Central do Brasil Railway are reported as combined totals for the Rio de Janeiro, São Paulo and Belo Horizonte systems.)	Year	Total	Sorocabana	Cantareira	Santos– Jundiaí	Central do Brasil
1944	22,572,195	2,603,573	7,040,954	12,927,668	N/A	1958	62,017,416	11,471,232	9,363,184	41,183,000	N/A
1945	23,944,917	2,575,138	7,865,067	13,504,712	N/A	1959	74,547,839	16,107,000	10,515,839	47,925,000	N/A
1946	24,200,157	3,535,761	8,663,067	12,001,329	N/A	1960	117,726,308	19,268,000	11,284,308	46,774,000	40,400,000
1947	26,867,535	4,310,306	9,369,825	13,187,404	N/A	1961	131,778,557	18,784,000	11,095,557	51,199,000	50,700,000
1948	33,011,435	4,459,216	9,003,219	19,549,000	N/A	1962	138,590,915	17,317,000	10,377,915	52,696,000	58,200,000
1949	35,569,749	6,185,000	7,768,749	21,616,000	N/A	1963	137,684,245	16,329,000	9,729,245	49,826,000	61,800,000
1950	53,125,718	7,030,000	7,677,694	24,086,000	11,800,000	1964	134,131,623	18,818,000	5,356,623	52,857,000	57,100,000
1951	41,325,718	7,606,000	7,405,718	26,314,000	N/A	1965	125,066,510	20,911,000	310,510	51,945,000	51,900,000
1952	44,704,258	8,093,000	7,809,258	28,802,000	N/A	1966	123,977,000	20,894,000	N/A	52,783,000	50,300,000
1953	48,827,751	8,879,000	7,366,751	32,582,000	N/A	1967	121,618,000	23,048,000	N/A	52,570,000	46,000,000
1954	53,878,711	9,785,780	6,390,931	37,702,000	N/A	1968	78,030,000	25,049,000	N/A	52,981,000	N/A
1955	58,993,891	9,633,430	6,247,461	43,113,000	N/A	1969	77,798,000	25,455,000	N/A	52,343,000	N/A
1956	67,298,767	11,184,776	8,662,991	52,343,000	N/A	1970	78,443,000	26,330,000	N/A	52,113,000	N/A
1957	62,463,272	11,878,542	8,314,730	42,270,000	Total		1,998,193,487	357,469,445	177,619,596	1,032,301,113	428,200,000
Notes: Sources: Sorocabana Railway: 1944 1945 1946 1947 1948 1949–1953 1954 1955–1957 1958 1959–1968 1969 and 1970; Cantareira Railway: 1944–1965; Santos–Jundiaí Railway: 1944 1945 1946 1947 1948–1961 1962–1968 1969–1970; Central do Brasil Railway: 1950 and 1960–1967

==== 1971–1995 ====
Annual ridership on Metropolitan Trains by Railway Company (1971–1995)
Year	Fepasa	RFFSA	Total	Year	Fepasa	CBTU	Total
1971	27,822,000	50,938,000 (Note: Santos–Jundiaí Railway only)	78,760,000	1984	79,040,638	192,800,000	271,840,638
1972	30,378,000	96,493,000	126,493,000	1985	86,731,479	213,933,000	300,664,479
1973	32,415,000	98,000,000	130,415,000	1986	94,529,071	213,536,000	308,065,071
1974	32,204,000	103,000,000	135,204,000	1987	101,932,168	217,508,000	319,440,168
1975	32,522,000	91,853,000	124,375,000	1988	92,375,968	205,502,000	297,877,968
1976	32,612,000	99,200,000	131,812,000	1989	111,938,629	216,793,000	328,731,629
1977	30,841,407	110,400,000	141,241,407	1990	111,242,209	212,014,000	323,256,209
1978	24,644,490	141,300,000	165,944,490	1991	112,697,791	230,040,000	342,737,791
1979	43,740,490	146,100,000	189,840,490	1992	109,440,803	168,155,000	277,595,803
1980	56,413,137	157,200,000	213,613,137	1993	104,899,689	154,874,000	259,773,689
1981	57,511,057	155,400,000	212,911,057	1994	101,570,558	64,500,000 (Note: CBTU (Jan–May))	166,070,558
1982	56,166,581	168,300,000	224,466,581	1995	105,912,281	149,095,719 (Note: CPTM)	255,008,000
1983	64,966,200	190,000,000	254,966,200	Total	1,734,547,646	3,759,637,719	5,494,185,365
Notes: Sources: Fepasa 1971 and RFFSA 1971–1972; Fepasa and RFFSA 1972–1976; Fepasa 1977–1995; RFFSA 1973–1974, 1976–1984 and CBTU 1985–1994; São Paulo State Government: 1972 (RFFSA)

==== CPTM (1995–2021) ====
CPTM took over the metropolitan lines of CBTU in São Paulo on 1 June 1994 and those of Fepasa in February 1996. From 1994 to 2021, the following number of passengers were carried:

vertical bar chart of annual ridership (in millions) between 1992(a) and 2019(b)
Sources: CBTU CPTM

(a) CBTU + FEPASA

(b) Highest number of passengers

Year	Ridership	Year	Ridership
1994	84,570,442 (Jun–Dec)	2008	541,100,000
1995	149,095,719	2009	586,300,000
1996	253,831,000	2010	642,000,000
1997	272,232,000	2011	700,200,000
1998	219,081,000	2012	764,200,000
1999	204,562,000	2013	795,400,000
2000	207,708,000	2014	832,900,000
2001	262,496,000	2015	831,400,000
2002	271,709,000	2016	819,500,000
2003	277,905,000	2017	827,700,000
2004	368,800,000	2018	863,300,000
2005	389,600,000	2019	867,700,000 (Note: Highest number of passengers ever recorded)
2006	430,200,000	2020	414,557,930
2007	465,700,000	2021	447,945,853
Total 13,791,693,944

==== CPTM, Tic Trens and ViaMobilidade (2022–) ====
Year	Ridership (CPTM)	Ridership (ViaMobilidade Lines 8 and 9)	Ridership (Tic Trens)	Total
2022	441,400,000	199,500,000	N/A	640,900,000
2023	457,400,000	228,700,000	N/A	686,100,000
2024	480,600,000	232,800,000	N/A	713,400,000
2025	473,400,000	240,100,000	10,200,000 (Nov–Dec)	723,700,000
Source: São Paulo Metro Company 2023, 2024, 2025

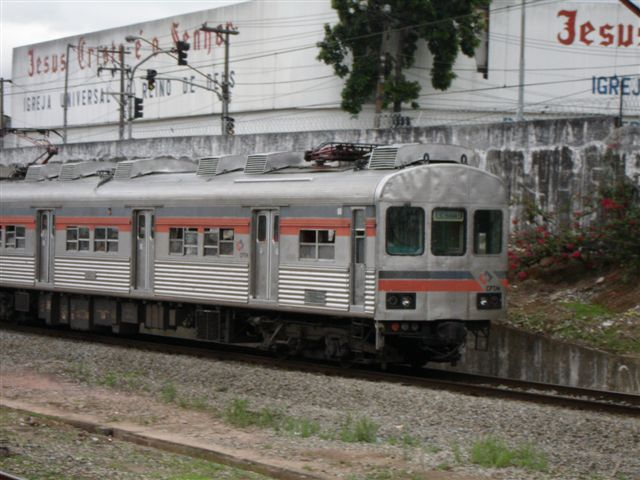
One of the trains involved in the Itaquera rail crash pictured in 2006. It was purchased and rebuilt by CBTU and a third window was added. The other train involved was completely dismantled due to severe structural damage.

== Accidents ==
- 13 April 1941 – São Paulo (SP) – The F-15 trainset of the Cantareira Railway derailed on a curve between Barro Branco and Mandaqui stations, overturning three of its cars and causing the deaths of three people and injuries to another 39.
- 26 March 1944 – São Paulo (SP) – Tucuruvi rail accident. Derailment of a Cantareira Railway train after a coupling failure. The accident resulted in 35 deaths and more than 100 injuries.
- 23 October 1958 – São Paulo (SP) – A collision between trains S–52 and CL-4 occurred near Lapa station (Sorocabana Railway) in São Paulo, resulting in two dead and dozens injured.
- 5 June 1959 – São Paulo (SP) – Engenheiro Goulart rail accident. A collision between two suburban trains caused the deaths of 48 passengers and injured 120 others.
- 3 March 1966 – São Paulo (SP) – A collision between train PE 6 and a bus at the level crossing of Tatuapé station left 11 people dead and 22 injured.
- 21 March 1969 – São Paulo (SP) – Perus rail accident. A collision between a suburban train and a maintenance locomotive resulted in 20 people dead and 400 injured.
- 30 November 1971 – São Paulo (SP) – A collision between a TUE General Electric/Pullman Company (EFS) trainset and a GE 1-C+C-1 (EFS) locomotive in the Água Branca area resulted in 12 dead and 60 injured.
- 17 May 1972 – São Paulo (SP) – A collision between suburban train U-75 and a truck at the level crossing of Lapa station (EFS) resulted in 13 people dead and dozens injured.
- 8 June 1972 – Suzano – Student Train Disaster. A collision between a suburban train and a long-distance train. The accident caused 23 deaths and about 100 injuries.
- 22 August 1977 – São Paulo (SP) – Arthur Alvim level crossing accident. A city bus crossed the Arthur Alvim level crossing and was struck by a suburban train. The collision caused the deaths of 22 people aboard the bus.
- 26 November 1981 – Itaquaquecetuba (SP) – A Series 400 train collided with a freight train at Manoel Feio station. Seven passengers were killed and 256 were injured.
- 8 December 1984 – São Paulo – A collision between two trains near Pinheiros station left two people dead and 50 injured.
- 26 December 1984 – Jandira – A collision between a freight train and a passenger train left three people dead and 43 injured.
- 17 February 1987 – São Paulo (SP) – Itaquera rail crash. A collision between two suburban trains near the former Itaquera station caused 51 deaths and 153 injuries.
- 28 July 2000 – São Paulo (SP) – Second Perus station accident. A collision between trains at Perus station caused the deaths of nine passengers and injuries to 115 others.
- 23 November 2000 – Barueri – One person died and 17 were injured in a collision between a bus and a CPTM train.

== See also ==
- Touristic Express
- São Paulo Metro - São Paulo metro system
- Ponte Orca
- Companhia Paulista de Trens Metropolitanos
- Transport in São Paulo
- List of suburban and commuter rail systems
