= Tourism in the city of São Paulo =

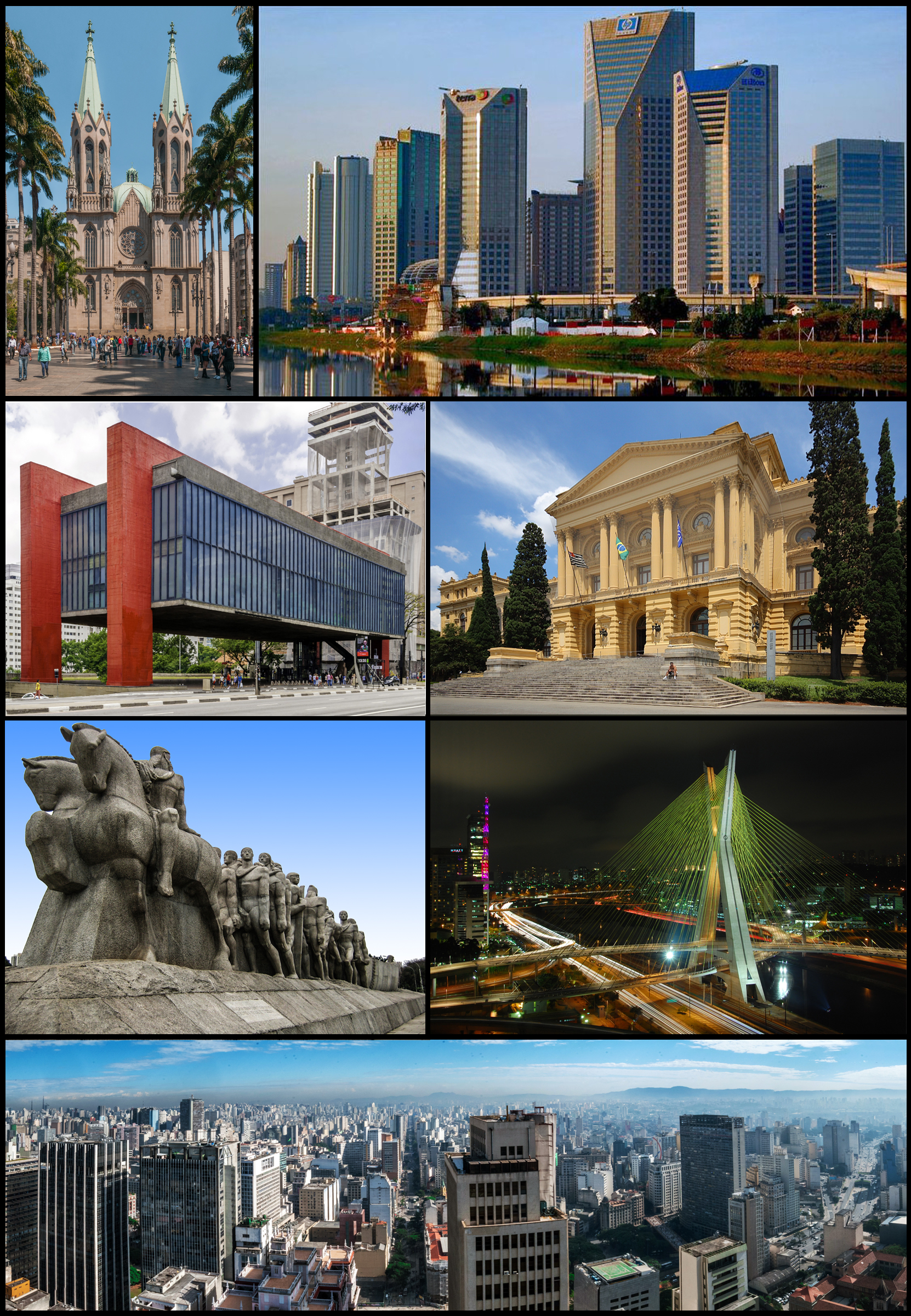
São Paulo's tourist attractions.

Tourism in the city of São Paulo stands out more for its business tourism than recreational tourism. However, cultural tourism is also important for the city, especially due to the several international events that take place in the region, such as the Art Biennial, the International Film Festival and the different performances with foreign celebrities that normally only happen on the Rio de Janeiro-São Paulo axis. The city has an average of one event every six minutes and between 410 and 550 hotels, offering visitors a total of between 42,000 and 50,000 rooms.

Despite its economic vitality, tourism is still a sector that exposes the severe socio-economic inequalities present in the place, given that, according to critics and scholars, a large part of São Paulo's cultural and tourist circuit excludes the city's own population from enjoying it, since it is located in the central metropolitan region.

In 2010, tourism in São Paulo reached a new record, receiving 11.7 million visitors. In 2012, there were 12.9 million tourists during the year, of which 10.8 million were domestic (Brazilian) and 2.1 million foreign, who spent R$10.2 billion in the city, according to the Ministry of Tourism. Of the domestic tourists, 25% are from São Paulo, followed by those from Minas Gerais. Among foreign tourists, North Americans and Argentinians visit the city the most.

In 2016, in order to simplify tourist visits to São Paulo, the Circular Turismo SP, a double-decker tourist bus that travels around the city's main landmarks (Municipal Market, República, Pacaembu, MASP, Ibirapuera Park, São Paulo Cultural Center, Pátio do Colégio and Municipal Theatre), was implemented in the city, guaranteeing passenger comfort and safety. At a cost of 40 reais, visitors can board and disembark unlimited times along the route and receive information about the history, architecture and culture of São Paulo.

== Overview ==
The local authority responsible for public projects and partnerships with private entities in the tourism sector in the city is SPTuris, which was known as Anhembi Turismo until 2005. The city receives an average of 11.3 million visitors; among these, 9.7 million are domestic, who stay in the city for around three days and spend between R$1,600.00 and R$3,500.00 on their trip; the 1.6 million international tourists stay in the city for around five days and spend between R$2,000.00 and R$5,000.00. People of more than 70 nationalities can be found in São Paulo.

São Paulo is the largest financial center in the country and has a vast amount of cultural facilities and leisure activities. There are 280 cinemas, 180 theaters, 110 museums and more than 90 cultural centers, which leads many people to say that "there's always something to do in São Paulo". The city's nightlife is also a benchmark and one of its highlights. It has more than 45 shopping malls and dozens of specialized shopping streets. In terms of gastronomy, there are more than 12,000 restaurants, with 52 types of cuisine, such as Japanese, Indian, Brazilian and Mexican.

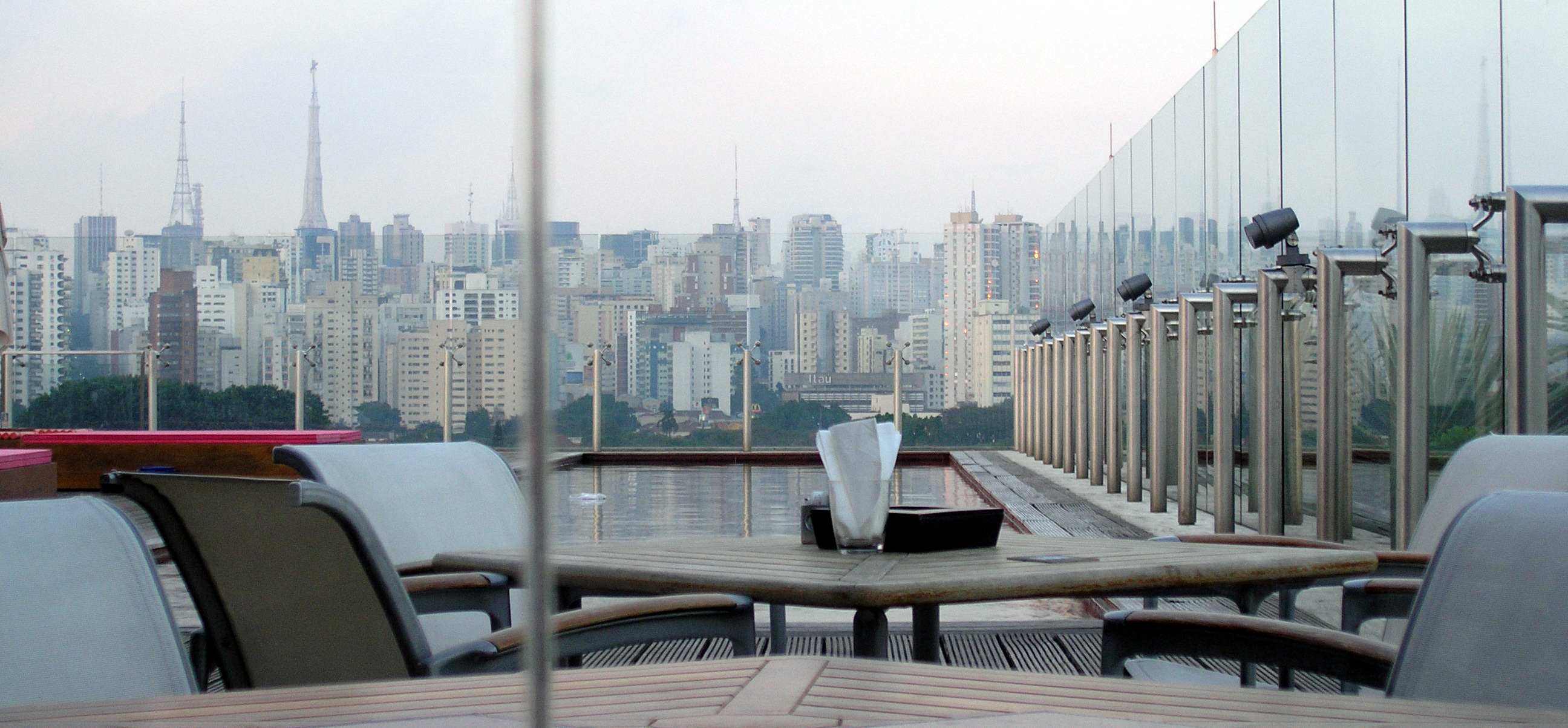
View from a hotel in Jardins.

== Transportation ==
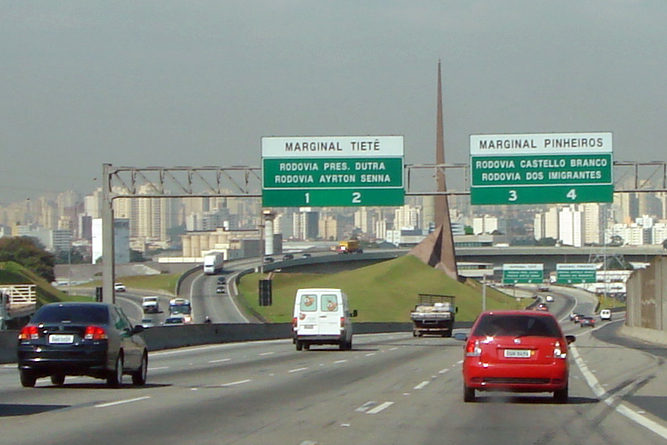
Rodovia dos Bandeirantes at the entrance to the city of São Paulo. This highway is one of the main links between the capital of São Paulo and the interior of the state.

Considered one of the main gateways to Brazil, the city of São Paulo has the country's busiest airport, São Paulo-Guarulhos International Airport, with around 21.6 million passengers moving through in 2009, and Congonhas Airport, with 13.6 million passengers traveling through in 2009. By land, the city has ten state and federal highways, as well as the Rodoanel Mário Covas connecting them.

The main point of arrival and departure for those arriving by bus is the Tietê Bus Terminal, the largest in Latin America and the second largest in the world. Other terminals are Barra Funda, which serves the interior of the state of São Paulo, and Jabaquara, responsible for the circulation of those arriving or leaving the São Paulo coast.

== Zero Milestone of the city of São Paulo ==
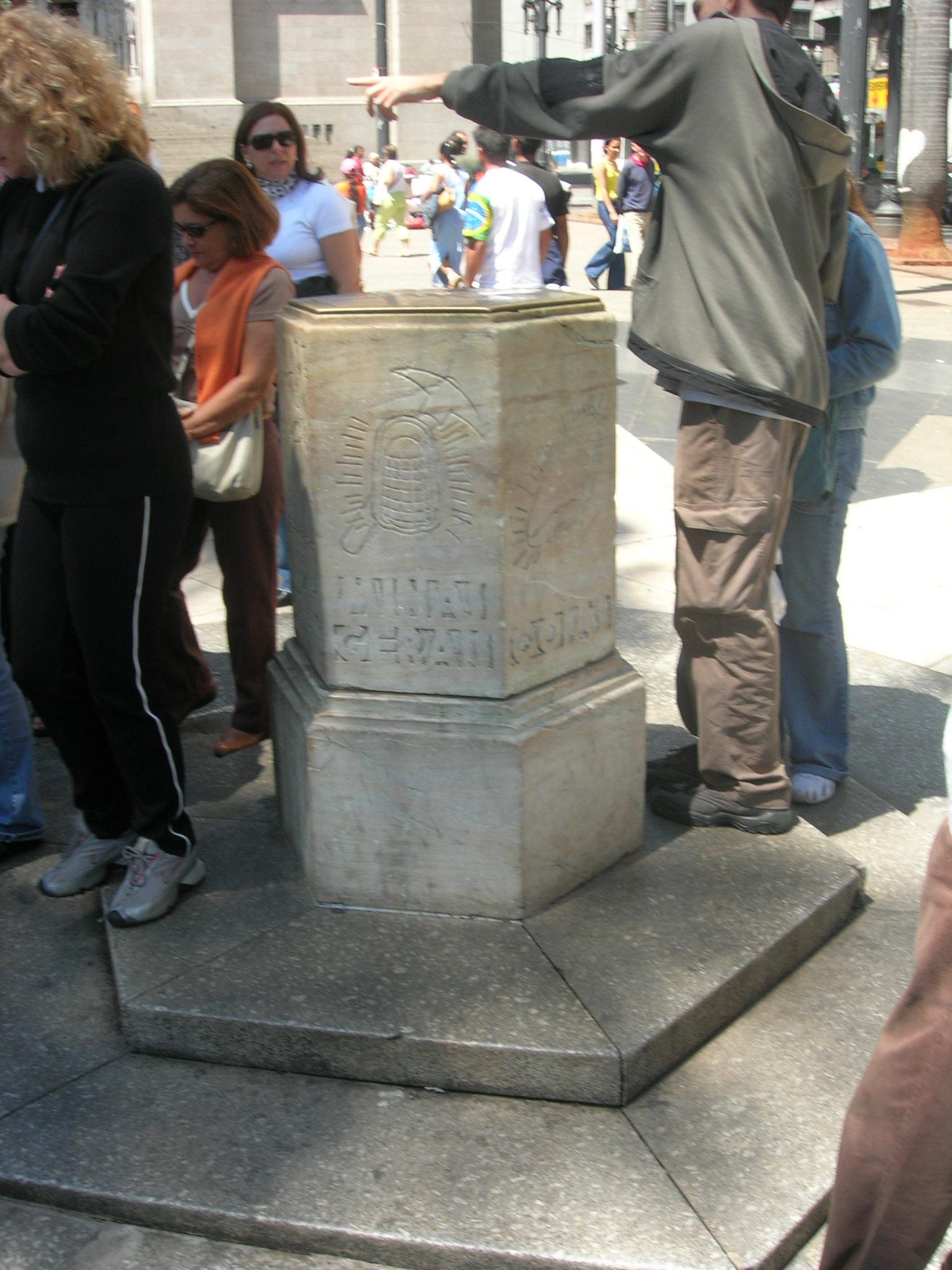
Hexagonal totem with directions to 6 important points in Brazil.

Formerly known as Largo da Catedral, the Zero Milestone of the city of São Paulo, designed by Dr. Américo Netto, was inaugurated on September 18, 1934, but only approved when it was given to the São Paulo branch of the Touring Club of Brazil.

In the square in front of the São Paulo Cathedral, there is a hexagonal totem made of marble and with a granite base; on the top, there is a bronze plaque with a partial map of the city of São Paulo with a symbol and the logo Touring Club do Brasil; on its sides, there is a marker indicating directions to 6 important points in Brazil, each with an indicative illustration. In the southwest, the city of Santos is represented by a steamship, in the south, Paraná by an Araucaria tree, in the northeast, Rio de Janeiro by a banana tree and the Sugar Loaf, in the north, Minas Gerais by a mining equipment, in the northwest, Goiás by a drum used in mining, and in the southwest, Mato Grosso by the clothing of the bandeirantes.

In 2017, in addition to being restored, the Zero Milestone was definitively listed by the municipal authority responsible for the city's historical heritage.

== Jaraguá Peak ==
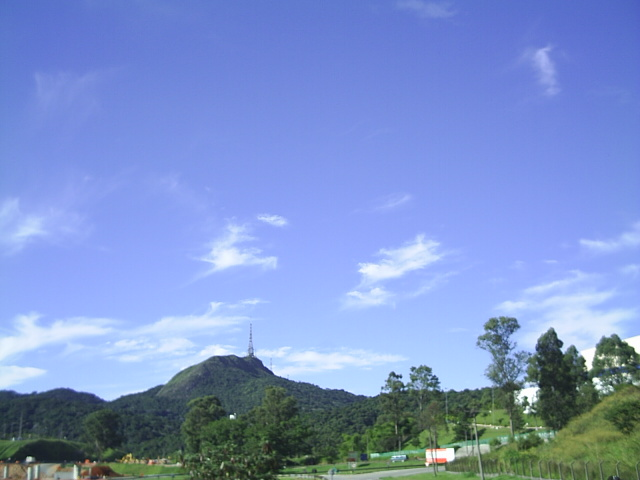
Jaraguá Peak

The Jaraguá Peak, located on Antônio Cardoso Nogueira street, in the northern part of the city of São Paulo, is the highest point in the city, with a view of up to 55 kilometers, reaching an altitude of 1,135 meters. The site was heavily explored for its large quantities of gold. After the resources were drained, it became a "traveler's landmark". It was also the scene of wars between bandeirantes and natives.

In 1946, the site was converted into a tourist attraction, and 15 years later, the Jaraguá State Park was created to give visitors access to the historic part of the place, such as the mansion of the bandeirante Afonso Sardinha, the area's oldest inhabitant. In 1983, it was recognized by the Council for the Defense of Historical, Archaeological, Artistic and Tourist Heritage (Condephaat), and in 1994 as a UNESCO World Heritage Site.

The peak can be reached in two ways: via a paved road, the Estrada Turística do Jaraguá, which starts at kilometer 18 of the Anhanguera highway, and via the Pai Zé Trail, a two-kilometer hike. At the top, visitors can take advantage of the small snack bars and use the local parking lot, as well as enjoying the best view of the city.

There are also two other trails that lead to the peak: the Bica Trail and the Silence Trail (designed for walks with senior citizens and people with special needs).

== Events ==
Due to its position as both a financial and cultural center for Brazil, São Paulo is responsible for hosting events of different content with an international dimension. The São Paulo Art Biennial, the Lollapalooza, São Paulo Fashion Week, the São Paulo Carnival, the Brazilian Grand Prix at the Interlagos Circuit, the São Paulo International Film Festival, the Motor Show, the LGBT Pride Parade, the March for Jesus (organized by the Reborn in Christ Church), the Prova Ciclística 9 de Julho, New Year's Eve on Paulista Avenue, among others, are examples of this type of event. The city also hosts fairs, congresses and exhibitions, such as Couromoda, the largest specialized fair in Latin America and the most important event for business and fashion launches in the footwear and leather goods market, Fenatran, Hospitalar, Francal, Equipotel and Adventure Sports Fair.

=== São Paulo Art Biennial ===
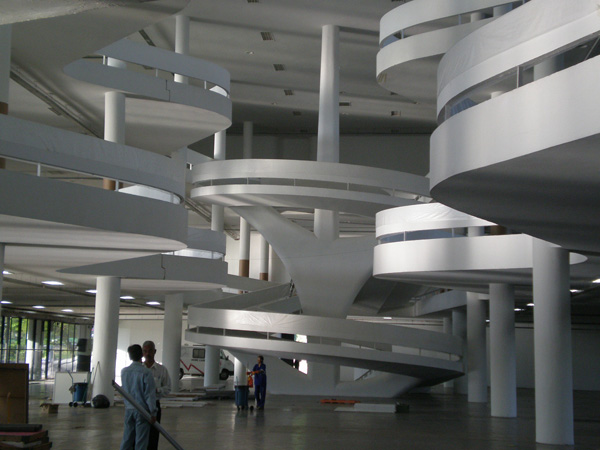
Building of the São Paulo Art Biennial.

The São Paulo Art Biennial is a cultural event that has been held every two years in the city of São Paulo since 1951. In 2008, the 28th edition welcomed around 1 million people. Forty artists of 20 different nationalities were selected for the exhibition in the 25,000 m^{2} pavilion designed by Oscar Niemeyer. Since its creation, 32 Biennials have been produced with the participation of more than 170 countries, 16,000 artists and 10 million visitors.

=== LGBT Pride Parade ===
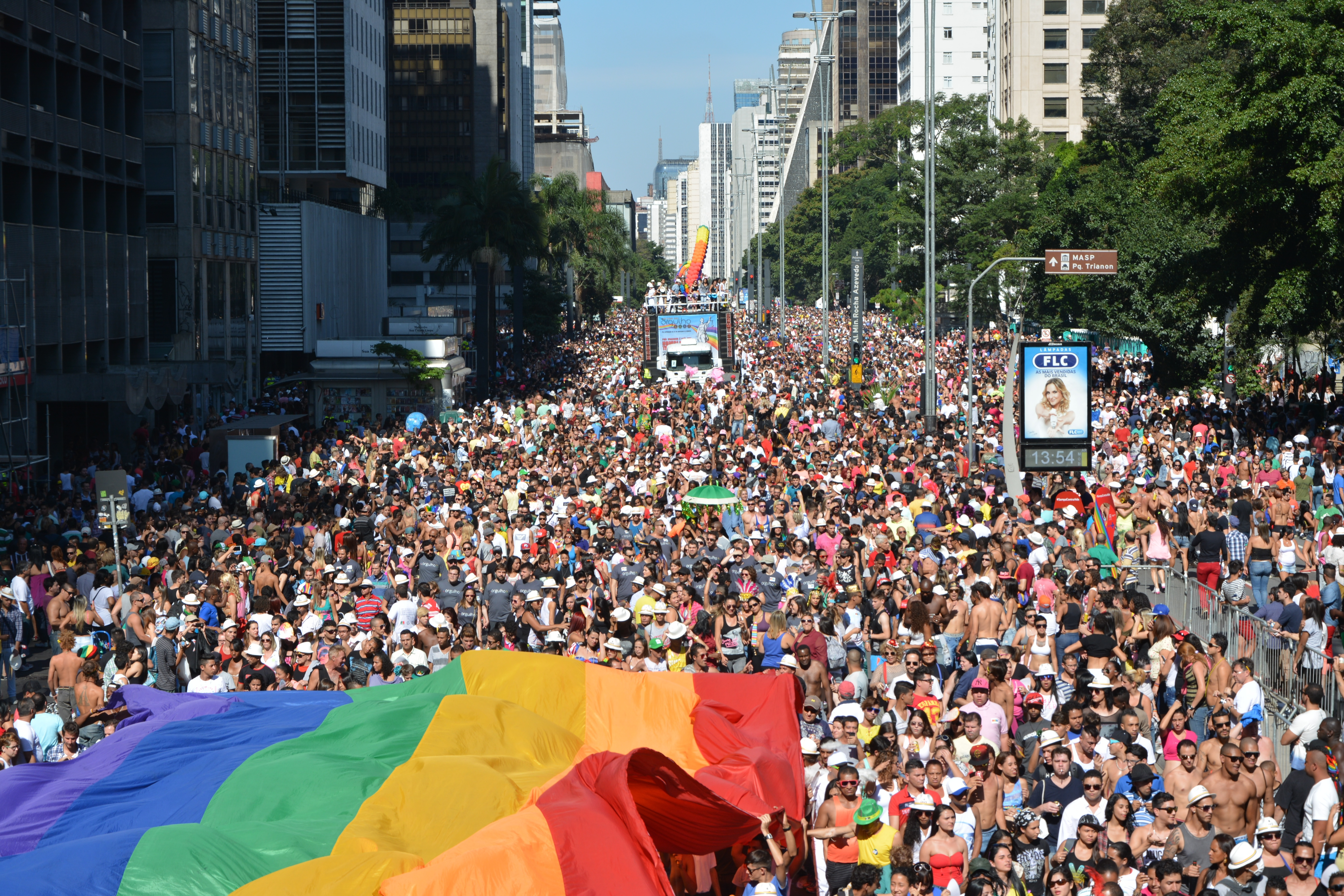
LGBT Pride Parade in São Paulo.

The LGBT Pride Parade is a tourist event in the city that attracted around 3.1 million people in 2009, surpassing large metropolises such as New York, which gathered 2.9 million people at its peak. Normally, the event is launched by the mayor and the gathering starts at Paulista Avenue, with dispersal in the city center. Along the route, there are electric trios from organizations linked to the LGBT movement and from commercial establishments (such as nightclubs), which play different types of music. Every year, the parade brings together several personalities. In 2015, global actresses Natasha Lyonee, Uzo Aduba and Samira Willey, from the famous series Orange is the New Black, attended the event. In 2016, the cast of Sense8 recorded scenes at the parade with their own electric trio.

According to SPTuris, the LGBT Pride Parade occupies first place in the ranking of events that attract the most tourists to the city, followed by Virada Cultural, the Art Biennial, the International Motor Show and Formula 1.

=== Prova Ciclística 9 de Julho ===
The Prova Ciclística 9 de Julho was created in 1932 by journalist Cásper Libero to honor the Constitutionalist Revolution that took place in the state of São Paulo. The route covers some of the city's main streets and avenues, starting and finishing at Lineu de Paula Machado Avenue, in front of the São Paulo Jockey Club. The riders pass through parks such as Ibirapuera, Mário Pimenta Camargo and Villa-Lobos, as well as the Cidade Universitária and Cidade Jardim bridges.

Since 1933, the event, which is also part of the UCI America Tour calendar, has been held on a single day, in the elite men's, elite women's and overall categories. From 1941 to 1946 (during the World War II era), from 1952 to 1954 and from 1966 to 1968, the race ceased to be held; in 1985, women were included in the competitions.

=== São Paulo Fashion Week ===
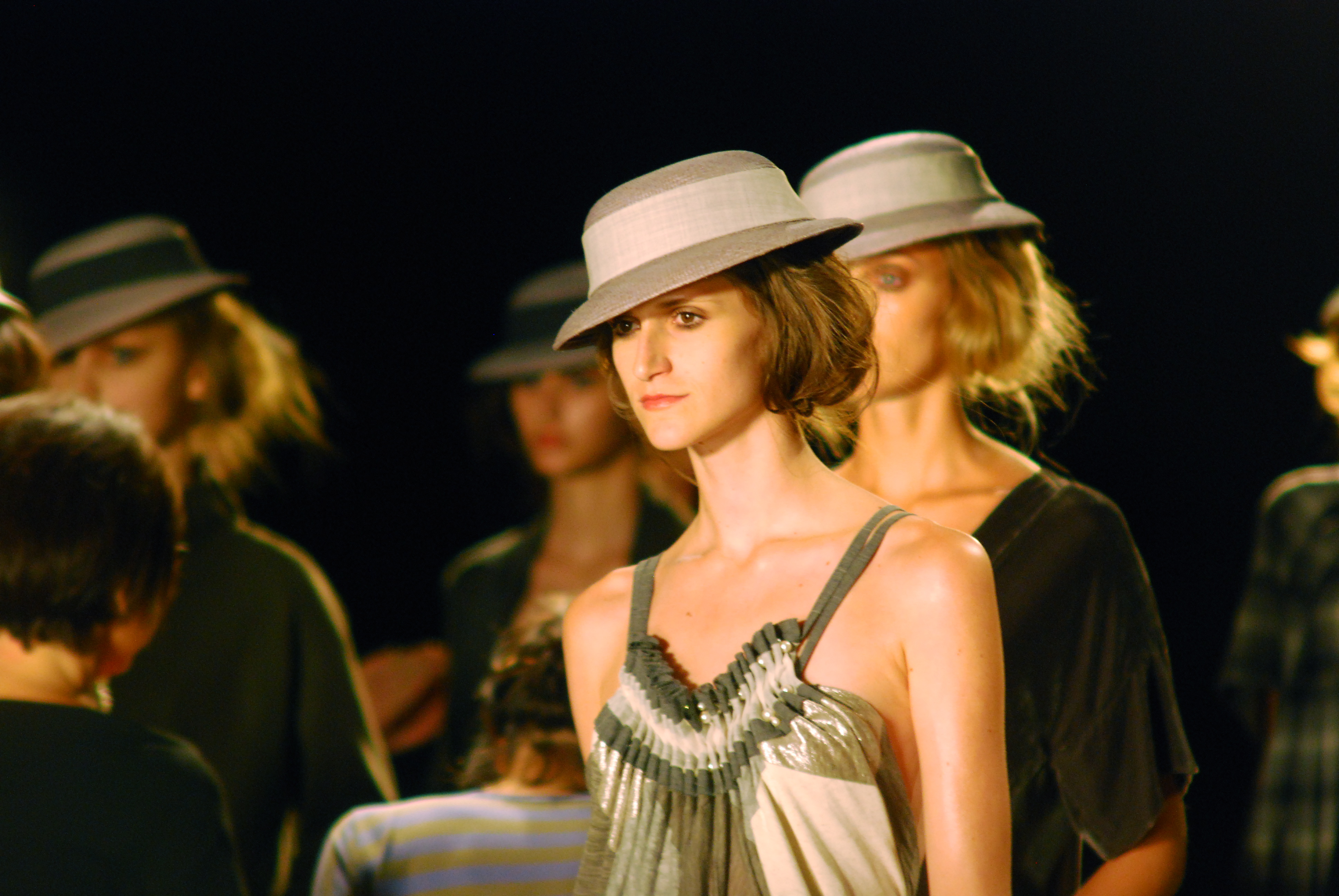
Models on show during São Paulo Fashion Week.

São Paulo Fashion Week, created in 1996 under the name Morumbi Fashion Brasil, is one of the most important fashion weeks in the world and is the largest and most important fashion event in Latin America. Some international models have had their careers projected through this event, such as Rhaisa Batista and Emanuela de Paula. Currently, the event takes place twice a year, with an edition in January presenting the winter collection and another in July with the summer collection.

Over the years, the event has grown in terms of investment, participating brands and designers, and attendance. Currently, it has gained even more prominence with the presence and participation of international personalities, such as American socialite Paris Hilton, actor Ashton Kutcher and actress, Demi Moore. Singer Christina Aguilera also attended the event for the new C&A collection.

Today, the event is considered the fifth largest fashion week in the world, behind Paris, London, Milan and New York. After more than ten years, São Paulo Fashion Week has established itself as an opportunity for Brazilian fashion brands to enter the fashion world, as well as supporting the area economically and industrially, particularly in the city of São Paulo and its cultural sector as a whole.

=== Carnival ===
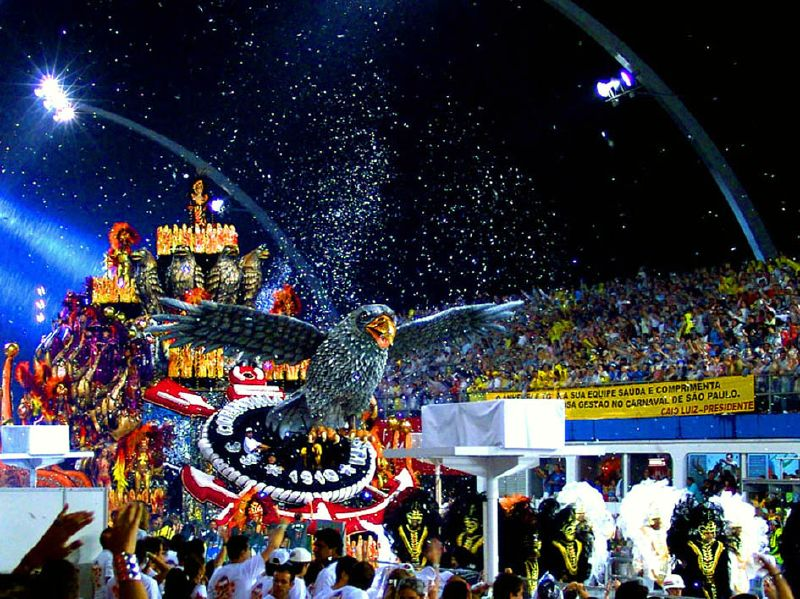
Gaviões da Fiel's opening car.

The São Paulo samba schools parade takes place on Friday and Saturday of Carnival week at the Anhembi Sambadrome, designed by renowned architect Oscar Niemeyer, who also designed the Marquês de Sapucaí Sambadrome in Rio de Janeiro. One of the great attractions of Carnival in the city are the bloquinhos, popular carnival manifestations that happen on the streets. In 2017, the City Hall registered a total of 500 bloquinhos, which are spread across the South, North and West zones.

=== Christmas ===
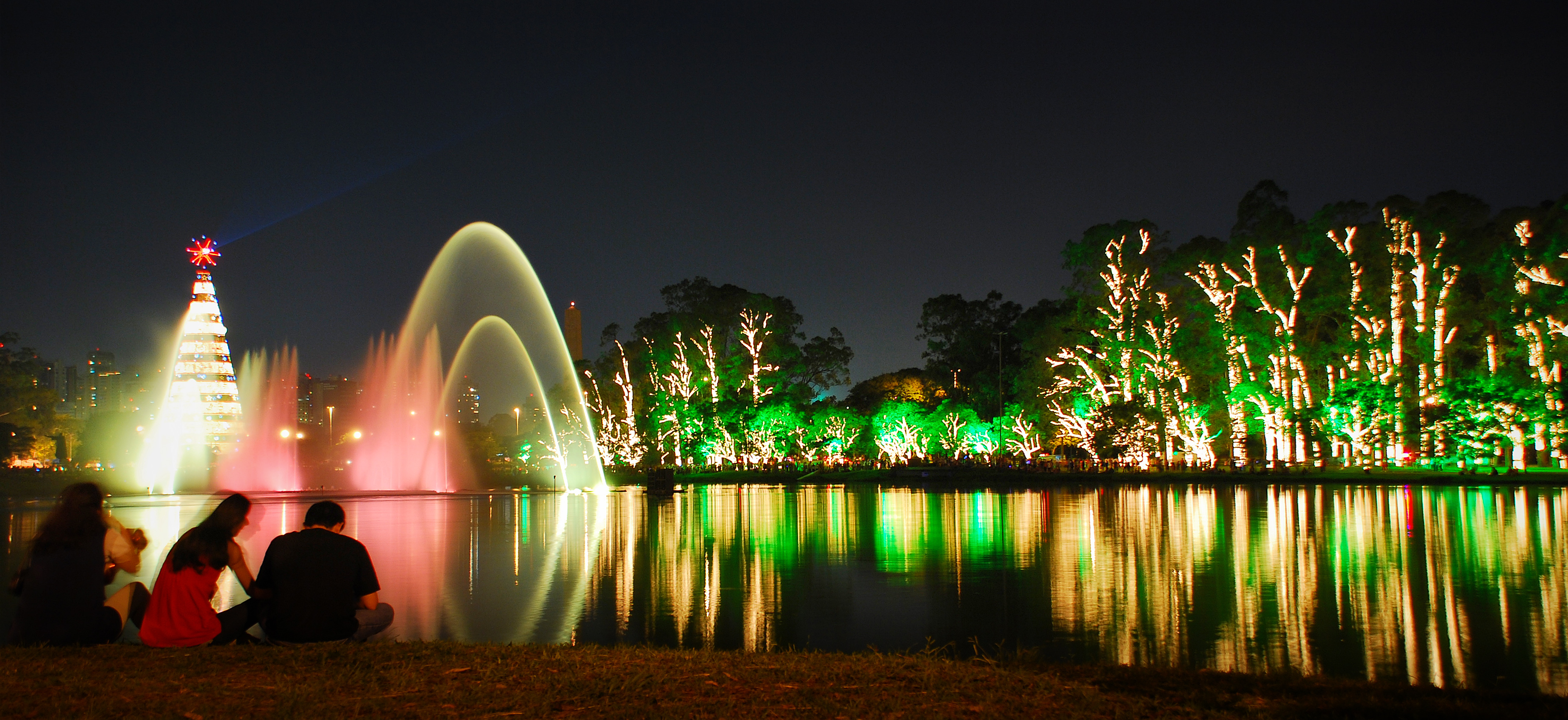
Ibirapuera Park decorated for Christmas.

Every year, São Paulo is decorated for Christmas. Tourists from all over the world visit the city for the holidays. According to Mayor Gilberto Kassab, R$5 million was invested in decorations in 2008, with 2.3 million points of light, making it the most illuminated Christmas in the world. There are several different types of decorations on different avenues, buildings, bridges and tourist attractions in the city.

The decorations are displayed on Paulista Avenue, the Municipal Theater, Matarazzo Building, Anhangabaú Valley, Ibirapuera Park, Octávio Frias de Oliveira Bridge, Guarapiranga Reservoir, Pacaembu Stadium, Robert Kennedy Avenue, Radial Leste, among many other places. The Christmas trees at Ibirapuera, the Octávio Frias de Oliveira Bridge and the Guarapiranga Reservoir are the three largest in the city, with 70, 100 and 30 meters, respectively.

In 2015, due to a lack of sponsors for Natal Iluminado, the Christmas decorations in the city of São Paulo lacked quality. Paulista Avenue had fewer attractions than in previous years, and Ibirapuera Park had the smallest Christmas tree since 2002, measuring 35 meters high, 15 meters in diameter and with a 4-meter star. In 2008 and 2009, the tree was 70 meters tall, twice the size of the one erected in 2015.

=== Electronic Language International Festival ===
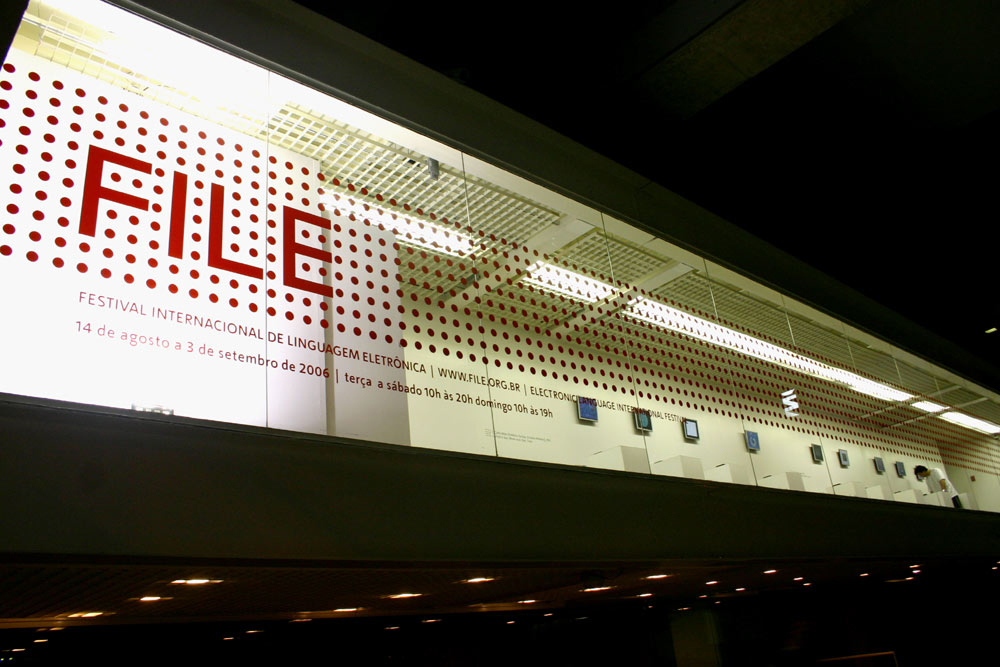
Electronic Language International Festival.

The Electronic Language International Festival (FILE) is a new media art festival that has been held annually in São Paulo since 2000 and occasionally in other cities around the world. It is the largest art and technology festival in Brazil, and serves as an indicator of the plurality of national and international research and productions in the multiple areas of digital culture: interactive art, screenings, performances, games, sound art, virtual reality, theoretical discussions and digital cinema. FILE is organized by a non-profit group whose intention is to disseminate and develop culture, arts, technology and scientific research. Admission to the event is free.

=== March for Jesus ===
The March for Jesus is an evangelical event that takes place every year in the central and northern areas of the city. At the end of the route, in the Santana neighborhood, several national and international bands perform. Organized by the Reborn in Christ Church, the event attracted around 1 million people in 2009, according to official estimates. Evangelicals from all over Brazil come to São Paulo to take part in the march. The organization considers it the biggest Christian event on the planet.

=== Brazilian Grand Prix ===
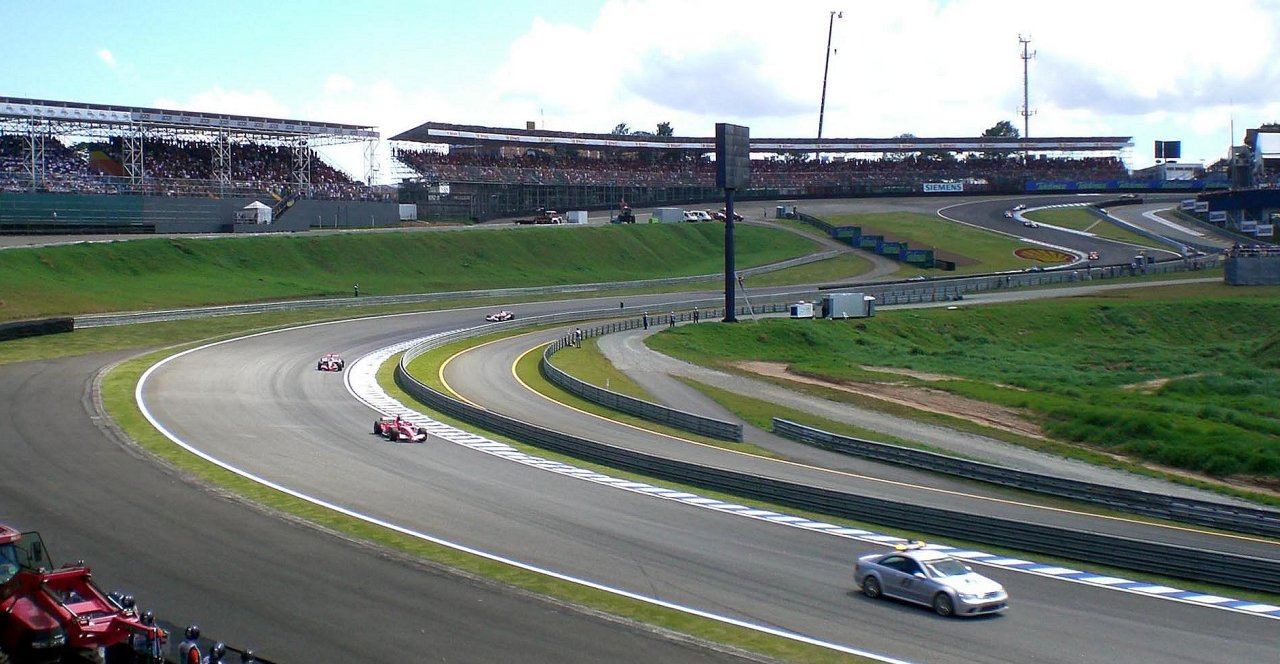
2006 Brazilian Grand Prix.

From the start of the Brazilian Grand Prix, in 1972, until 1980 (with the exception of 1978) and from 1990 until today, the event has been held at the Interlagos Circuit in São Paulo. On October 18, 2009, a race attracted 85,000 tourists to the city. The course, like Singapore Street Circuit and Istanbul Park, is one of the few circuits on the current Formula One calendar to have an anti-clockwise direction.

=== São Paulo International Motor Show ===
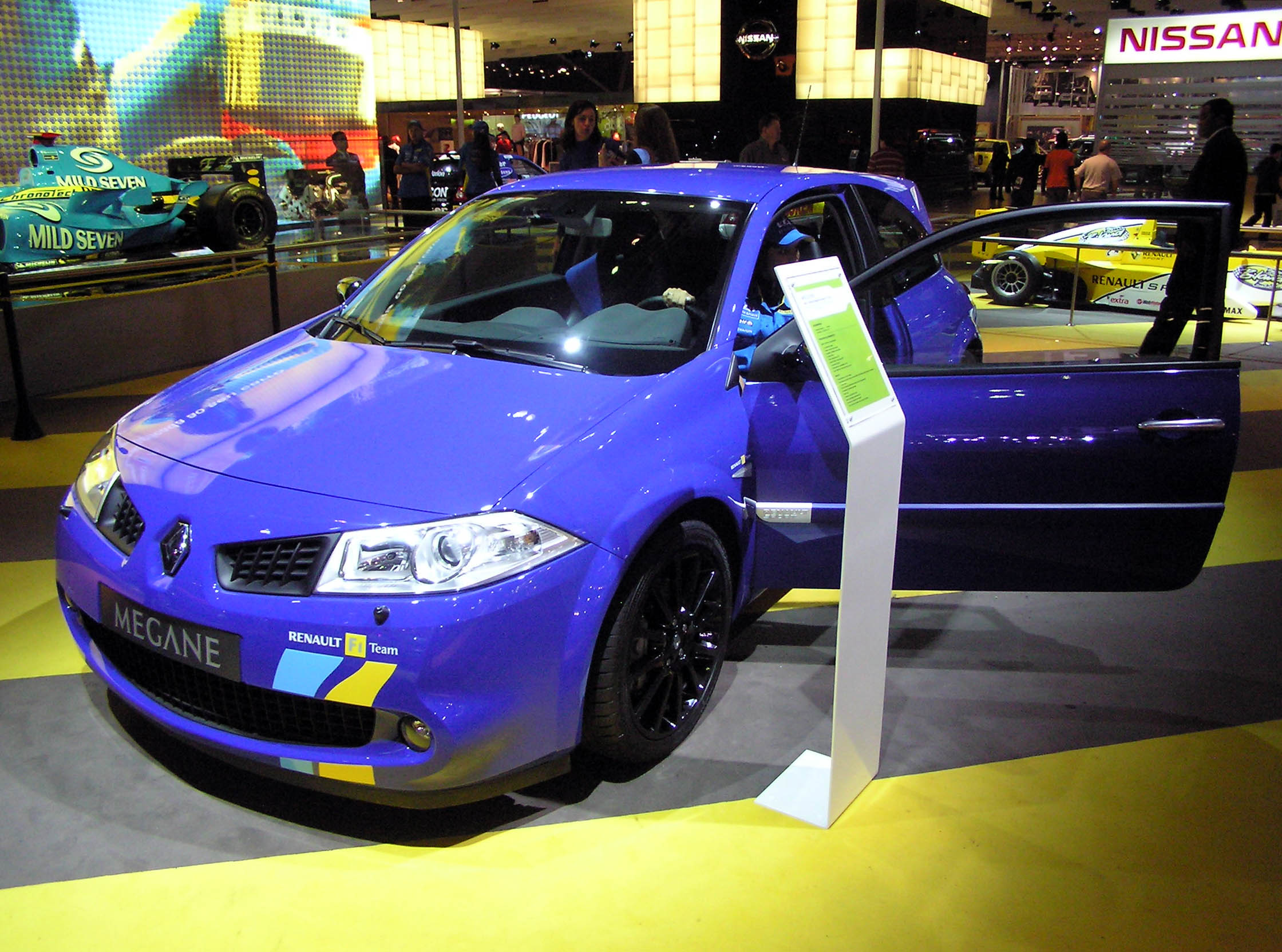
Renault Mégane on display at the 2006 Motor Show.

The São Paulo International Motor Show is an event held every two years at the Anhembi Park, which aims to showcase innovations in the automotive world, exhibiting cars and some sound equipment and products. In 2008, the 25th edition of the event attracted an audience of 625,330 people. The 2010 show was attended by 750,283 thousand people, while the 2012 show attracted 748,733 thousand people and the 2014 show 756,114 thousand. In 2016, the number of visitors decreased, with a total of 715,477 visitors attending the event. In contrast to the lower number of visitors, the event, which took place at the SP Expo events center, met with record approval.

=== Virada Cultural ===
Virada Cultural is an annual event promoted by the São Paulo City Hall since 2005 with the aim of promoting a 24-hour cultural marathon in the city. The celebration was inspired by the Parisian Nuit Blanche, which takes place every year in Paris with attractions that stretch into the early hours of the morning.

Virada's great advantage has been to bring first-rate attractions to citizens from all walks of life, many of whom have never been to a theater or concert hall before. It has also contributed to the revival of São Paulo's Old Center by bringing citizens to the area, which usually empties out at night.

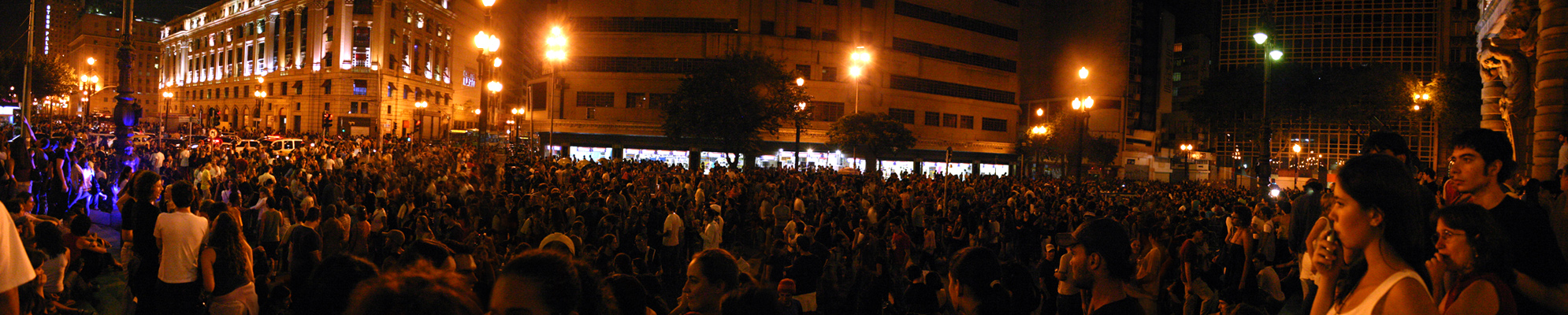
Virada Cultural 2007, in the center of São Paulo. In the background, on the left, the Shopping Light and the Anhangabaú Palace, headquarters of São Paulo City Hall.

=== Lollapalooza São Paulo ===
Lollapalooza is an annual music festival that features genres such as alternative rock, heavy metal, punk rock, hip hop bands, and comedy and dance performances, as well as craft stands. It also provides a platform for political and non-profit groups. Lollapalooza has presented a wide variety of bands and helped expose and popularize artists such as Metallica, Alice in Chains, Tool, Red Hot Chili Peppers, Pearl Jam, The Cure, Primus, Rage Against the Machine, Soundgarden, Arcade Fire, Nine Inch Nails, Nick Cave, L7, Janes Addiction, X Japan, The Killers, Siouxsie and the Banshees, The Smashing Pumpkins, Muse, Hole, 30 Seconds to Mars, The Strokes, Arctic Monkeys, Foo Fighters, Green Day, Lady Gaga, Franz Ferdinand, Hot Chip, Fun, The Chainsmokers, The Weeknd, Martin Garrix, among others. In its second edition, held at the São Paulo Jockey Club in 2013, the event brought together an average of 56,000 people a day over three days, on March 29, 30 and 31.

In 2014, 2015, 2016 and 2017, the event was held at the Interlagos Circuit. In 2017, the event brought together 190,000 people over two nights of performances, the largest audience of any edition.

=== Marijuana March ===
The Marijuana March is a demonstration that brings together thousands of people. It takes place every year and the demonstrators demand the legalization of recreational use of the drug and the medicinal use of the herb.

In 2016, the major concentration of the protest was on Paulista Avenue, in the MASP area. The demonstrators walked to Roosevelt Square with traffic blocked along the way. The organization estimates that around twenty thousand people attended the event in 2016.

== Landmarks ==
=== Beco do Batman ===
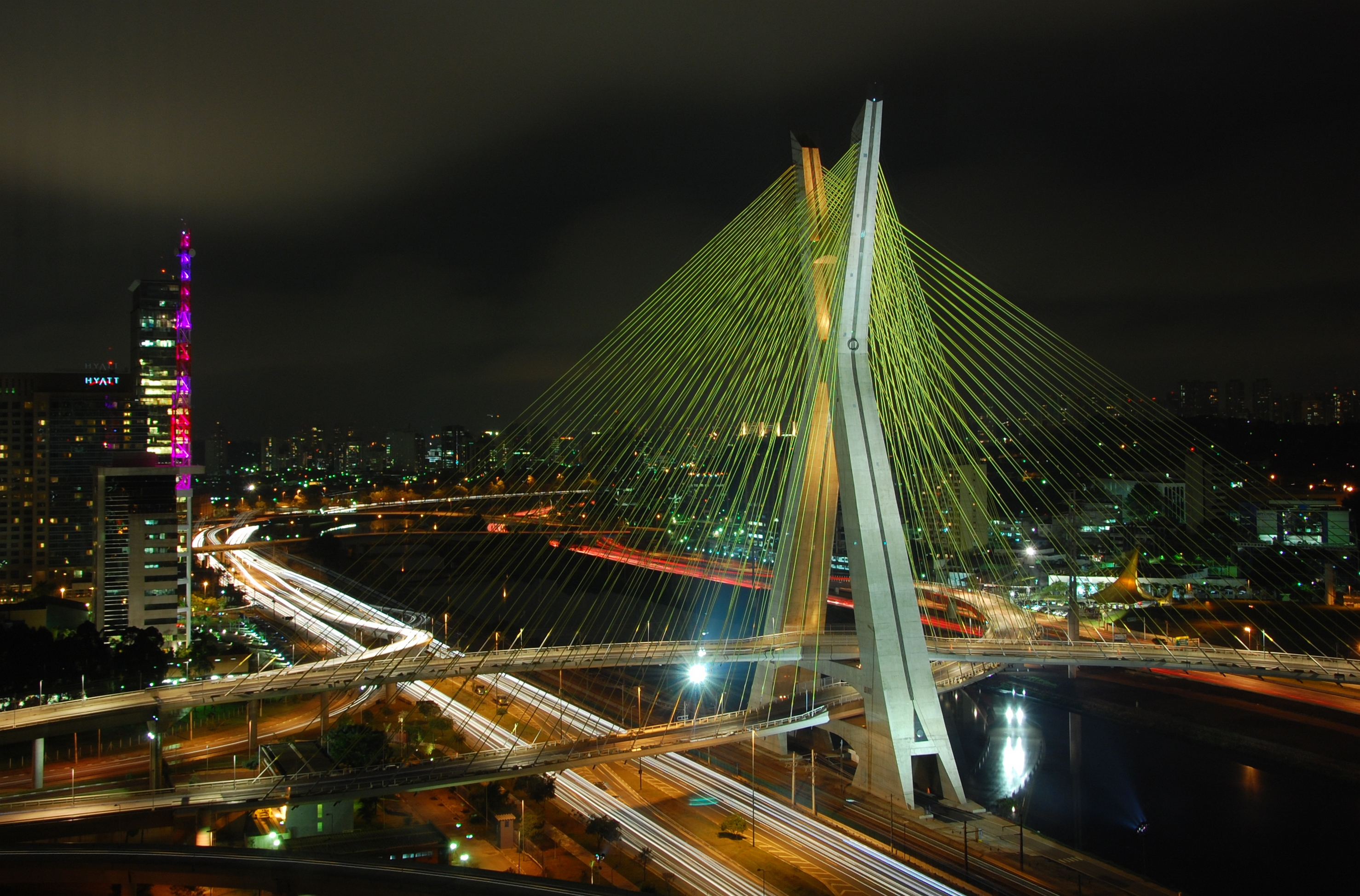
The Octávio Frias de Oliveira Bridge, the city's newest postcard.

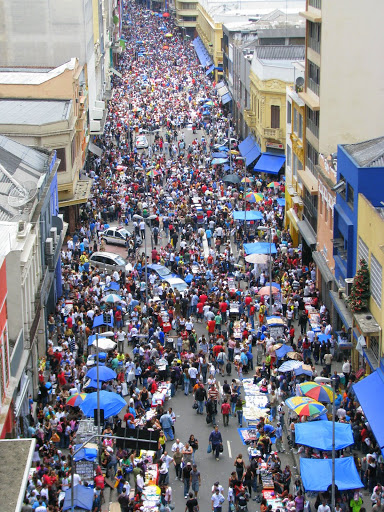
Rua 25 de Março.

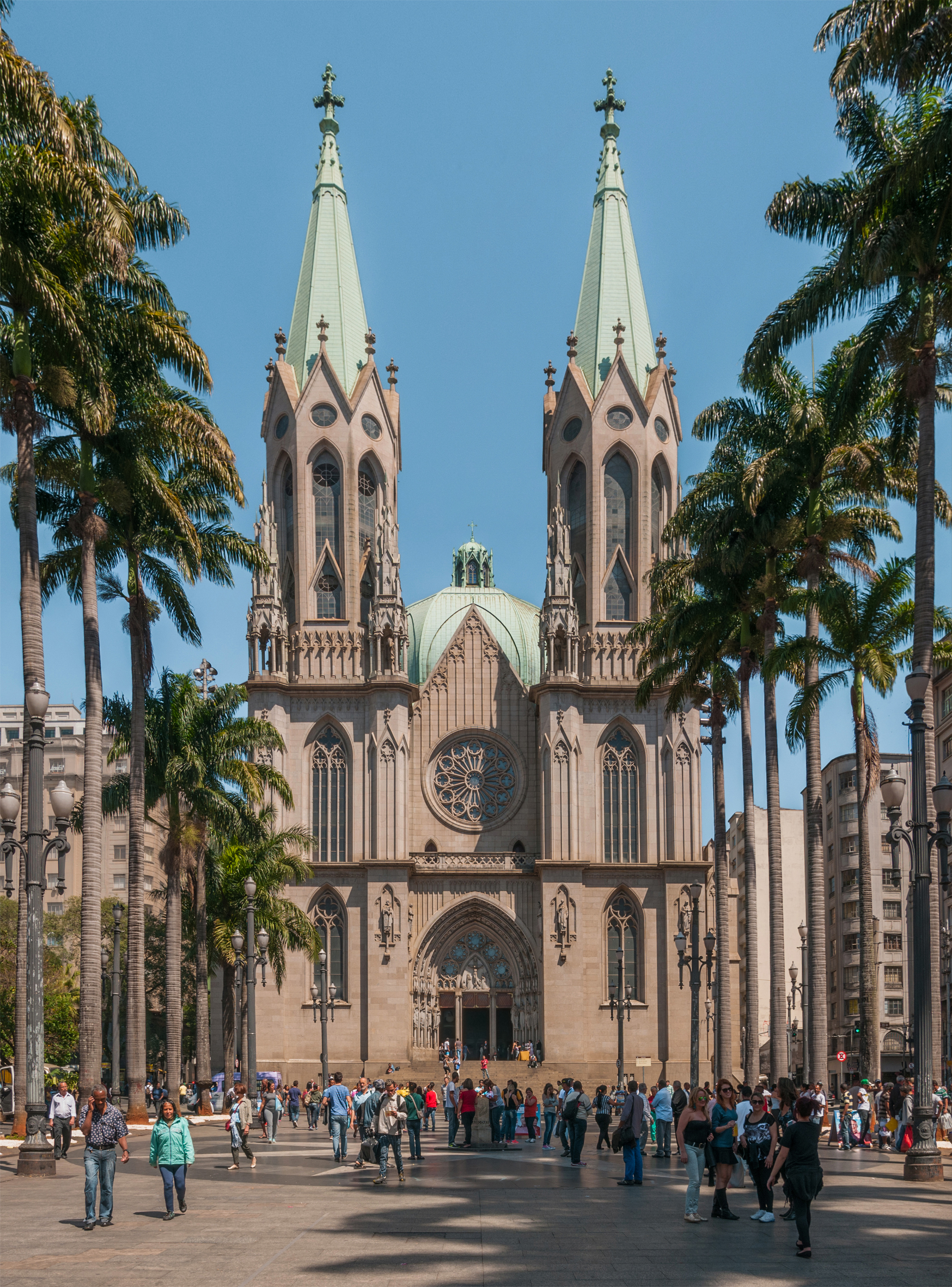
São Paulo Cathedral.

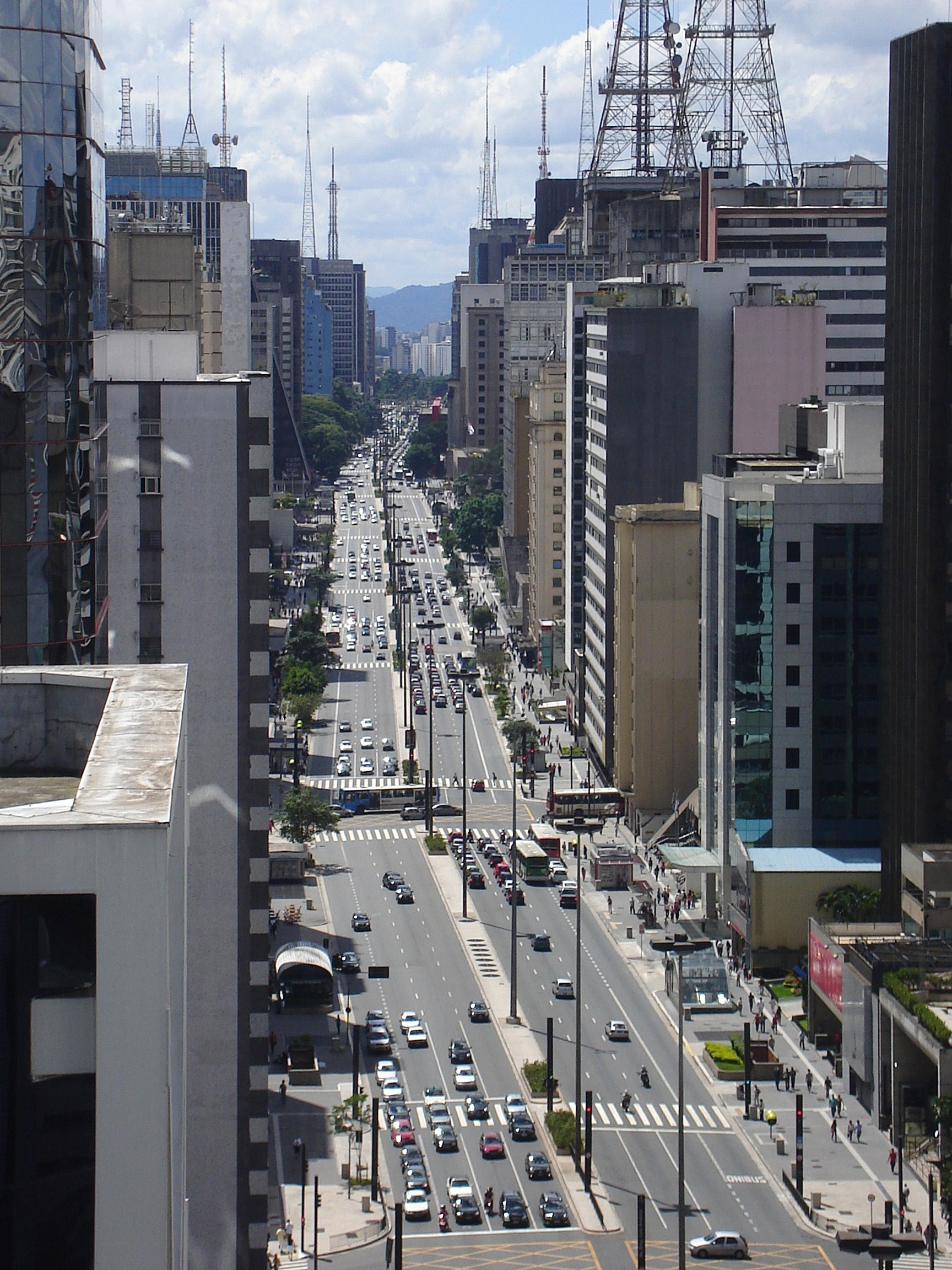
Paulista Avenue, the city's main avenue and postcard.

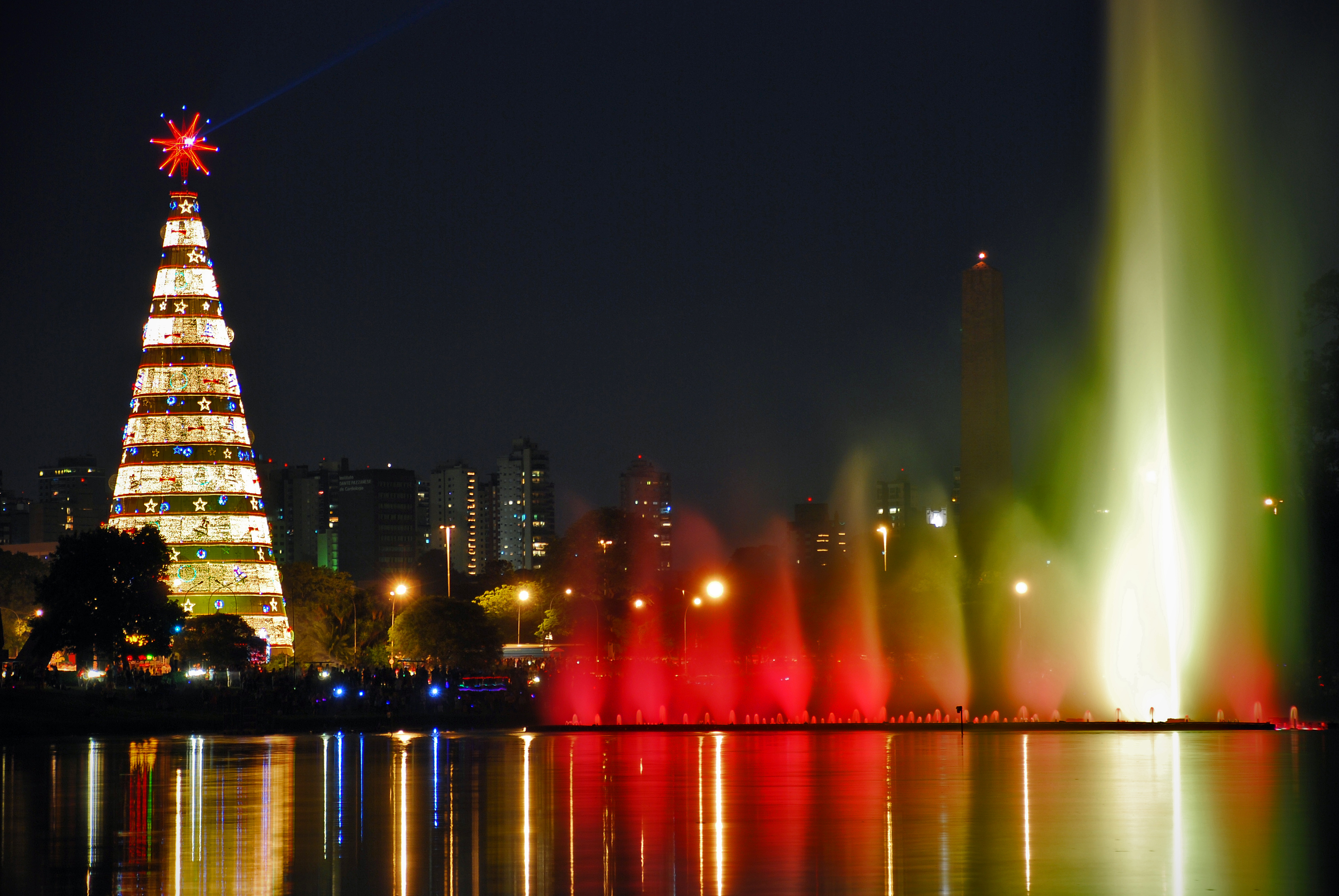
Ibirapuera Park decorated for Christmas. Photo by Silvio Tanaka.

Beco do Batman is located in the Vila Madalena neighborhood, in São Paulo's West Zone, between Medeiros de Albuquerque and Gonçalo Afonso streets, close to the Clinicas Metro station. The narrow alleyway is a well-known tourist attraction in the city, not only because it is located in a bohemian neighborhood with many bars and restaurants, but also because its walls are covered in graffiti, making it practically an open-air art gallery.

The history of Beco began in 1980, when art students found a drawing of Batman on the walls of the neighborhood and decided to start making psychedelic and cubist-influenced drawings there. Currently, the walls of the site are all covered in drawings by the most diverse artists, who alternate with a certain frequency, constantly generating new paintings. The graffiti artists have the support of the community, which helps to preserve the site.

Whether for their beauty or the picturesque nature of the place, the walls of the Beco attract all kinds of people, most of whom take advantage of the works to take photos. The walls of the alley have become so famous that they have often been the setting for advertising campaigns and professional photo shoots, making them one of the most significant tourist attractions for lovers of urban art. Nowadays, the space is even visited by schools and classes from various courses to get to know the independent art space.

=== Rua 25 de Março ===
Rua 25 de Março is considered to be the largest shopping center in Latin America, as it is home to the largest number of wholesale and retail outlets. The street vendors who sell a variety of products also stand out. As it is a very busy place, with around 400,000 people a day, it attracts many tourists, mainly because of the variety and low prices of different products in more than 3,500 points of sale. 26% of visitors say that shopping is their main activity in the city.

=== Municipal Market of São Paulo ===
The Municipal Market of São Paulo, better known as Mercadão, is one of the city's main tourist attractions, located at 306 Cantareira Street. It has been open since 1933, bringing São Paulo residents and tourists different types of leisure and culture, which come together with a variety of foods, both typical of each region and foreign. Due to this diversity, many restaurants buy their spices at the Mercadão.

Its structure, designed by Ramos de Azevedo, was focused on supplying the great demand for commerce around it. Its architecture displays beautiful colored stained glass windows by Russian artist Conrado Sorgenicht Filho that depict the daily life of rural workers and farming. The building spans 12,600 meters and houses more than 1,500 employees.

The Mercadão, as well as being a place to shop, has also become a gastronomic space with its variety of cuisine. The dishes that are constantly in demand are the famous pastel de bacalhau, along with the bolinho de bacalhau, and the traditional mortadella sandwich. On Sundays at noon visitors can find concerts in the food court.

=== Pinacoteca do Estado de São Paulo ===
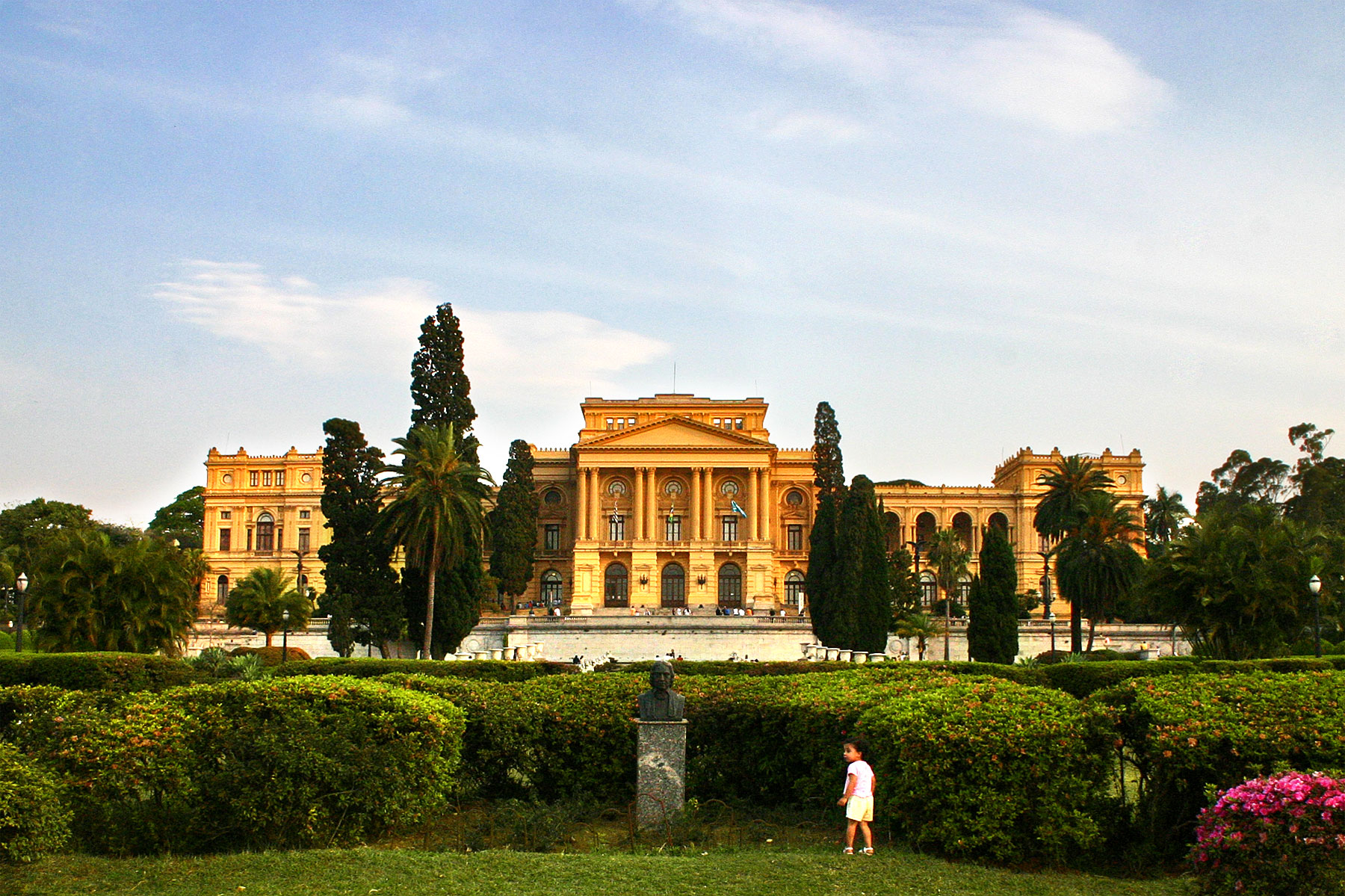
The gardens of Ipiranga, in São Paulo, where Brazil's independence was proclaimed. In the background, the Ipiranga Museum building. Photo by Silvio Tanaka.

The Pinacoteca do Estado de São Paulo is one of the most important visual arts museums in the country and the oldest museum in the city. Its collection, inaugurated on December 24, 1905, emphasizes on Brazilian works, ranging from the 19th century to the present day, and initially consisted of around 20 works by important artists such as Pedro Alexandrino, Almeida Júnior and Oscar Pereira da Silva; today has almost 10,000 works by renowned artists, making it an internationally renowned museum.

Located near the Luz Station, another important landmark in the city of São Paulo, the Pinacoteca occupies the former Liceu de Artes e Ofícios building, designed by architect Ramos de Azevedo in the 19th century. The building underwent an extensive renovation in the late 1990s and currently holds 30 exhibitions a year, receiving over 500,000 visitors during this period. The Pina, as it is also known, is considered one of the most dynamic cultural institutions in the country and is now part of the international exhibition circuit.

=== Architectural references ===
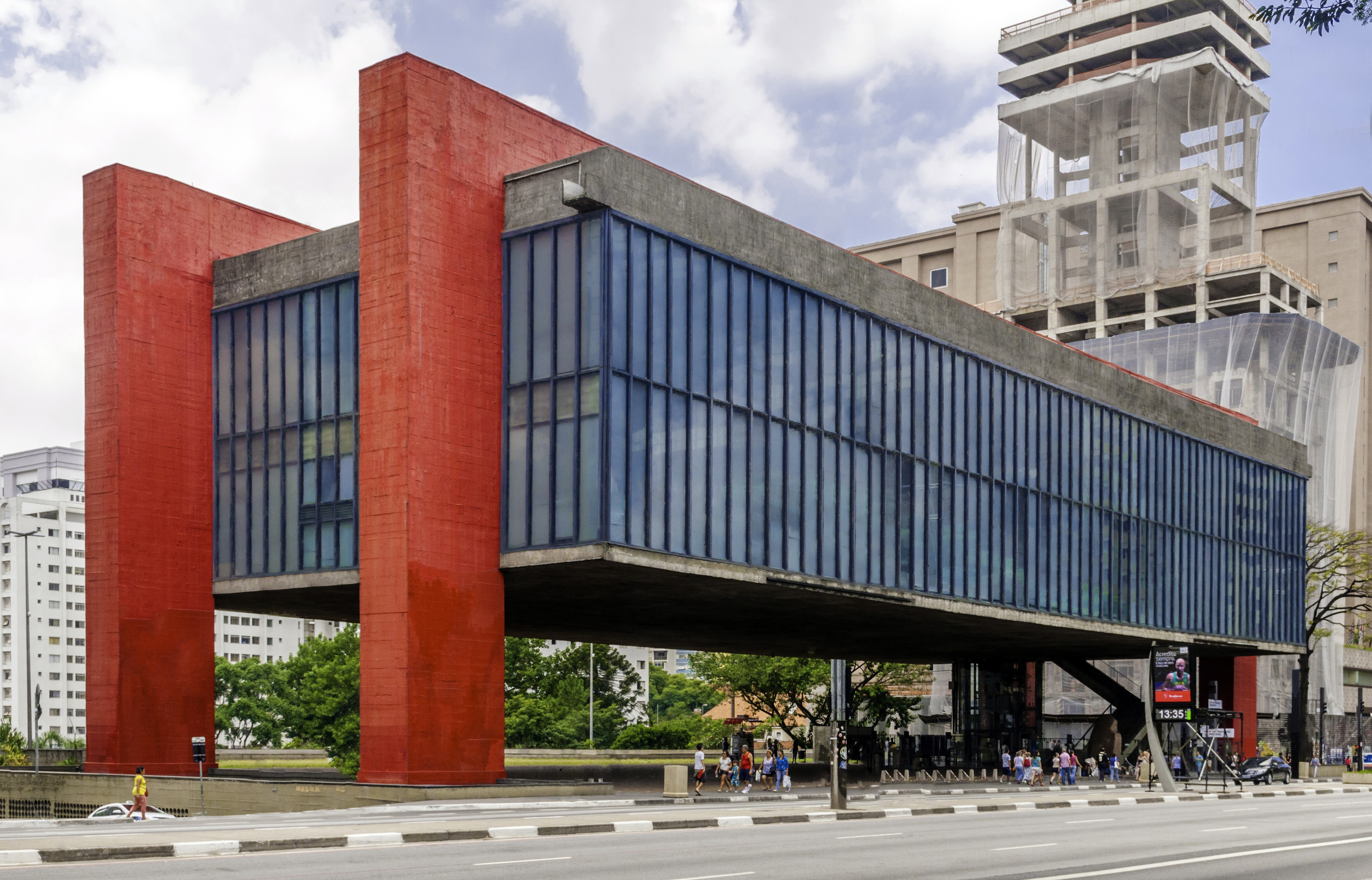
MASP, one of the city's main postcards, next to Trianon Park.

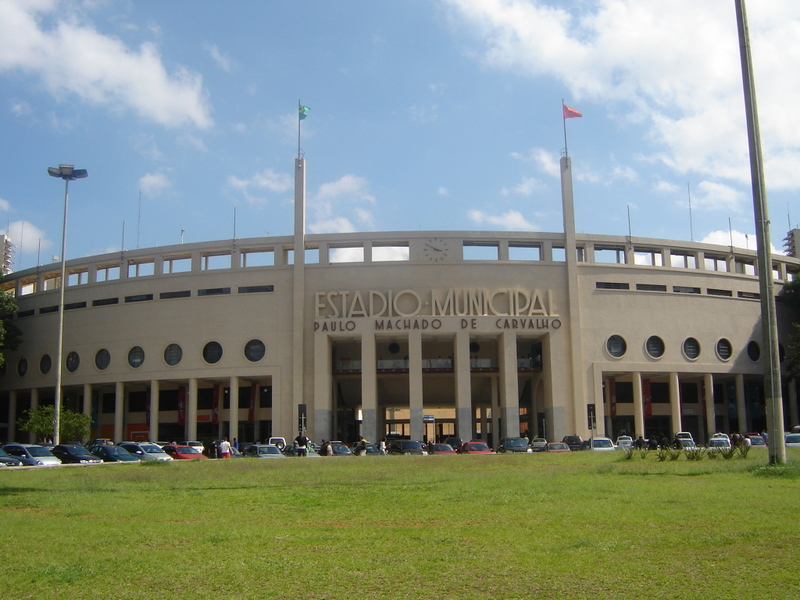
Pacaembu Stadium, which houses the Football Museum.

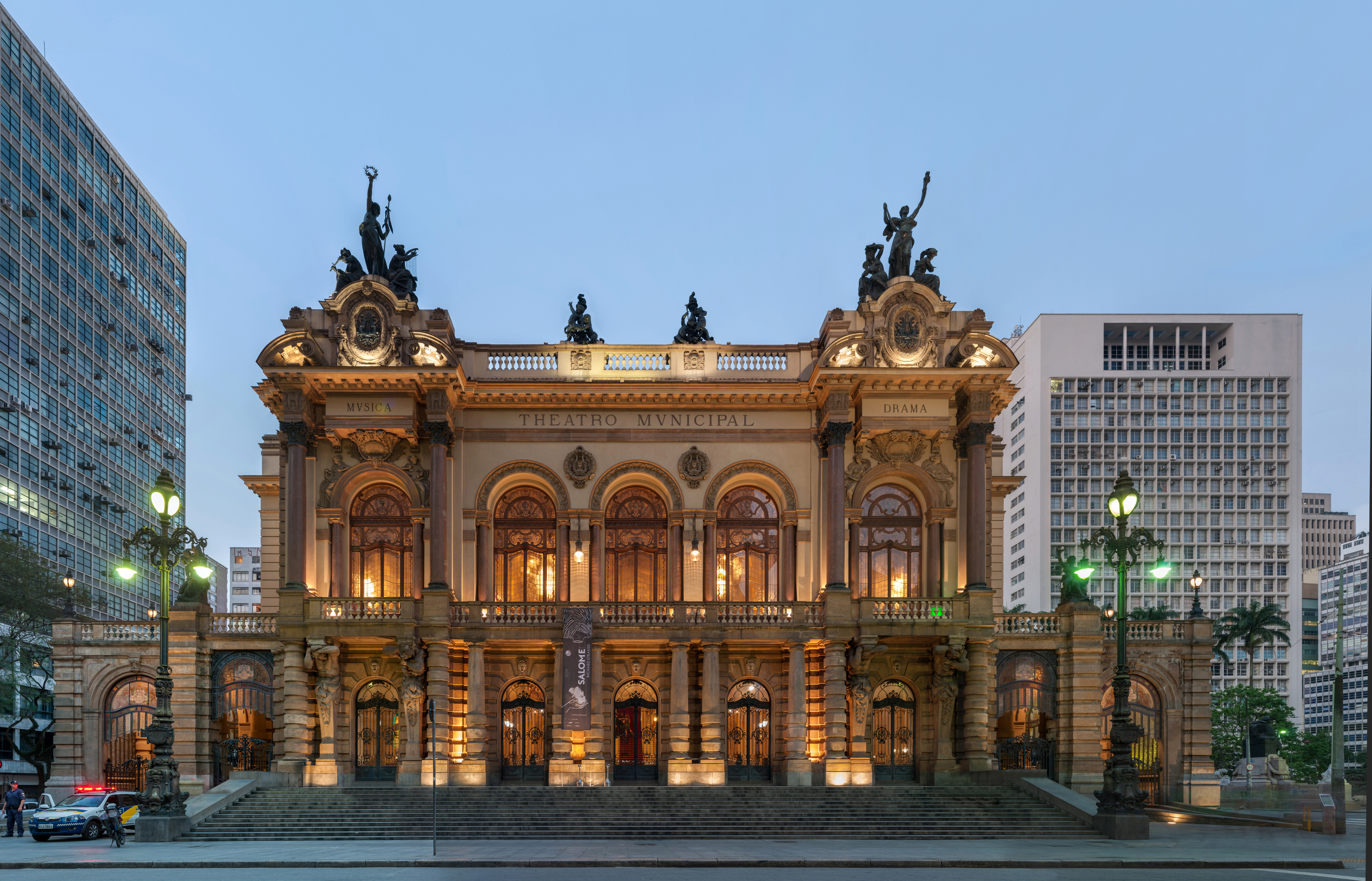
Municipal Theatre of São Paulo.

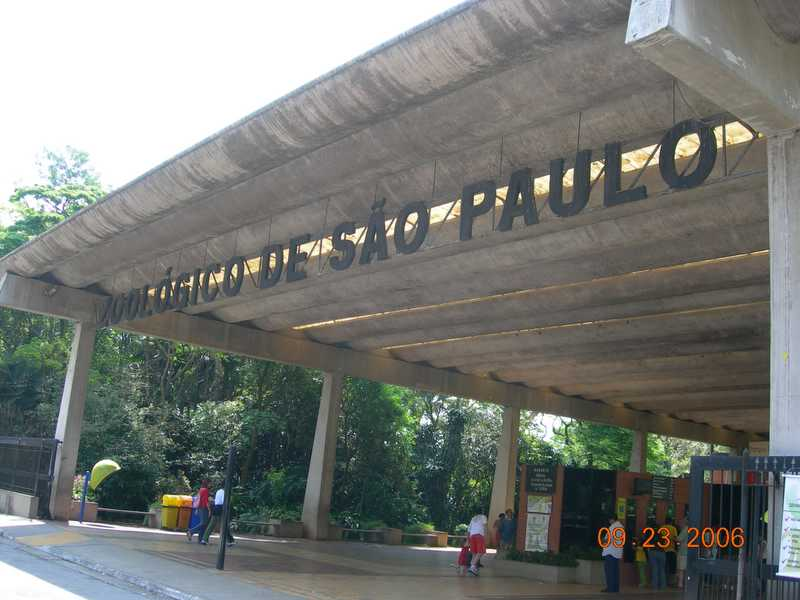
São Paulo Zoo, the fourth largest in the world.

- Paulista Avenue
- Octávio Frias de Oliveira Bridge
- São Paulo Cathedral
- Luz Station
- Largo do Arouche
- Saint Benedict's Monastery
- São Paulo Museum of Art (MASP)
- Viaduto do Chá
- Altino Arantes Building
- Italy Building
- Copan Building
- Martinelli Building
- Post Office Palace
- Unique Hotel
- Júlio Prestes Station
- Church of Our Lady of the Rosary of Black Men

=== Cultural attractions ===
- Artistic-Cultural Collection of the Governmental Palaces of the State of São Paulo
- Public Archives of the State of São Paulo
- Ibirapuera Auditorium
- Armando de Salles Oliveira University City - USP
- Bank of Brazil Cultural Center
- São Paulo Cultural Center
- Municipal School of Astrophysics
- Science Station of the University of São Paulo
- Pinacoteca Station
- Maria Luisa and Oscar Americano Foundation
- Instituto Butantan
- Latin America Memorial
- Immigration Museum
- Brazilian House Museum
- Portinari House Museum
- Casa das Rosas
- Aeronautics Museum
- Historical Museum of Japanese Immigration in Brazil
- Museum of the Portuguese Language
- São Paulo Museum of Image and Sound
- Museum of Archeology and Ethnology of the University of São Paulo
- Museum of Veterinary Anatomy
- Museum of Contemporary Art
- Museum of Sacred Art
- São Paulo Museum of Modern Art
- Civil Police Museum of the State of São Paulo
- Museum of Zoology of the University of São Paulo
- Football Museum
- Dentist Museum
- Instituto Butantan Biological Museum
- Ipirang Museum
- Professor Dimas de Melo Pimenta Clock Museum
- Gaetano Ferolla - SPTrans Museum of Public Transportation
- Memória do Bixiga Museum
- Lagar Segall Museum
- Paço das Artes
- Pinacoteca do Estado de São Paulo
- Pátio do Colégio
- Professor Aristóteles Orsini Planetarium
- Carmo Planetarium
- Municipal Theatre
- Júlio Prestes Cultural Center
- Saint Peter Theatre

=== Leisure ===
- Galeria do Rock
- Interlagos Circuit
- Anhembi Convention Center
- Brás
- Bom Retiro
- Morumbi Stadium
- Pacaembu Stadium
- Allianz Parque
- Oswaldo Teixeira Duarte Stadium
- São Paulo Aquarium
- Anhembi Sambadrome
- Parque da Mônica
- Colônia Crater
- Albert Löfgren State Park
- Workers' Sports, Recreational and Educational Center
- Botanical Garden
- Jockey Club
- Municipal Market
- Alfredo Volpi Park
- Anhanguera Park
- Aclimação Park
- Independence Park
- Burle Marx Park
- Dom Paulo Evaristo Arns Youth Park
- Cantareira State Park
- Carmo Park
- Jardim da Luz
- Ibirapuera Park
- Fontes do Ipiranga Biological Reserve
- Guarapiranga Ecological Park
- Mário Pimenta Camargo Municipal Park
- Tietê Ecological Park
- Piqueri Park
- Trianon Park
- Villa-Lobos State Park
- Jaraguá State Park
- São Paulo Zoo
- Guarapiranga Reservoir
- Billings Reservoir
- Beco do Batman
- Vila Madalena
- Oscar Freire Street

== See also ==
- Tourism in Brazil
