= Jaraguá State Park =

Biological reserve in São Paulo, Brazil

- Parque Estadual do Jaraguá
- IUCN category II (national park)
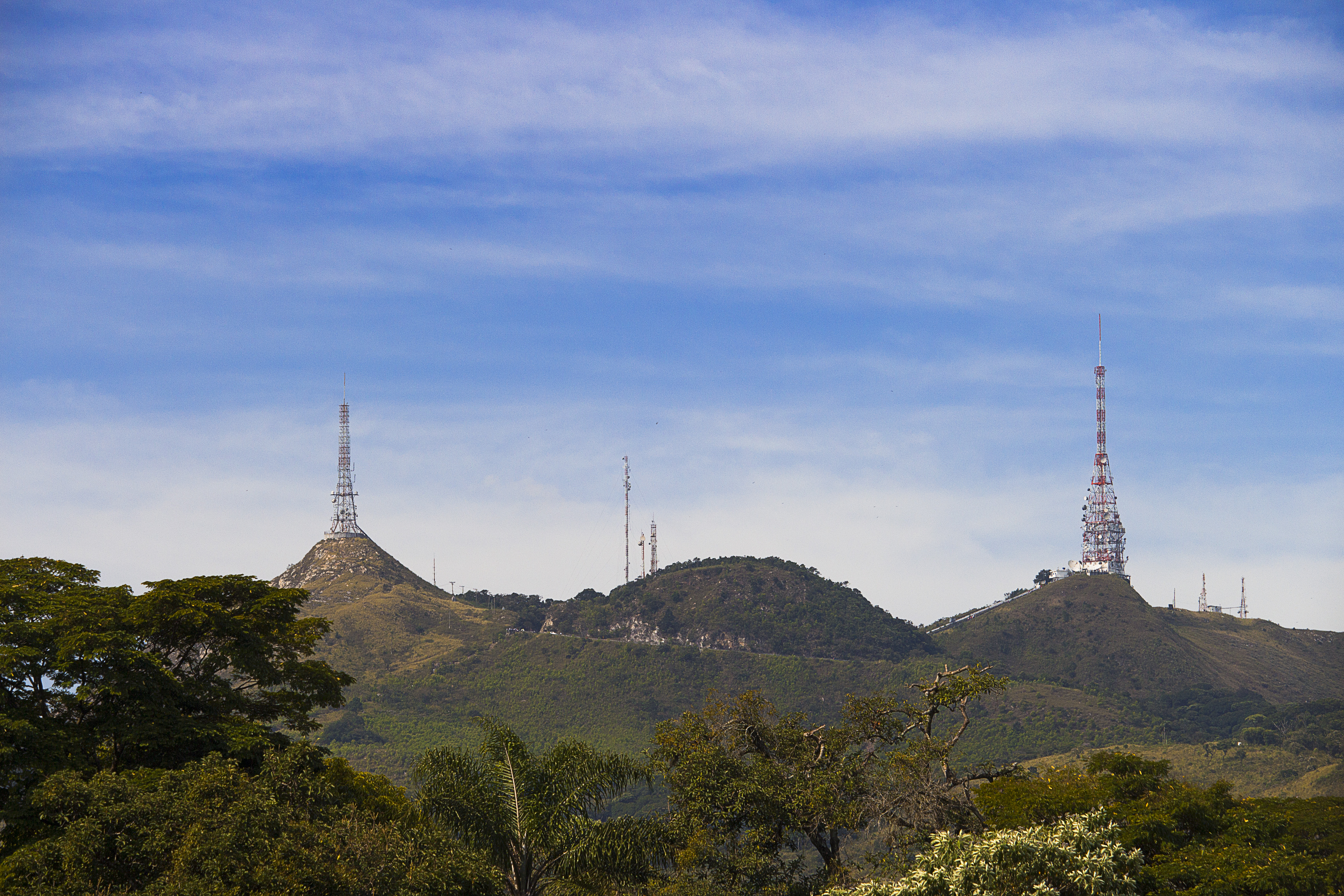
- View from Jaraguá peak

- Location within Brazil
- Location: São Paulo; Brazil
- Coordinates: 23°27′34.3″S 46°46′2.8″W
- Area: 492 hectares (4.92 km^{2})
- Established: May 3, 1961; 65 years ago
- Governing body: Instituto Florestal; Fundação Florestal

Jaraguá State Park (Portuguese: Parque Estadual do Jaraguá) is a preservation area located in the state of São Paulo, Brazil. It was created in 1961 in the Serra da Cantareira, around the Jaraguá Peak, the highest point in the municipality of São Paulo with an altitude of 1,135 meters.

The park includes Afonso Sardinha's house, listed as a historical heritage site, and the place where slaves washed the gold they found in the region. There are three trails with total contact with nature. It is also possible to meet a tribe of indigenous people who still live there today.

Covering an area of 492 hectares, the park is located in the northwest of the city of São Paulo, where the Tropic of Capricorn passes by. Its main attraction is the Jaraguá Peak, which in Tupi means "lord of the valley". Due to its magnificence, it is a reference point for those arriving in or leaving the capital via the Anhanguera-Bandeirantes road system.

The park is considered one of the last remnants of the Atlantic Forest in the Greater São Paulo region. Due to its proximity to urban areas, this biome is among the most vulnerable on the planet. Located more precisely in the Jaraguá district, its borders are the Perus and Pirituba districts and the municipality of Osasco.

== Features ==
=== Jaraguá-Itu Village ===
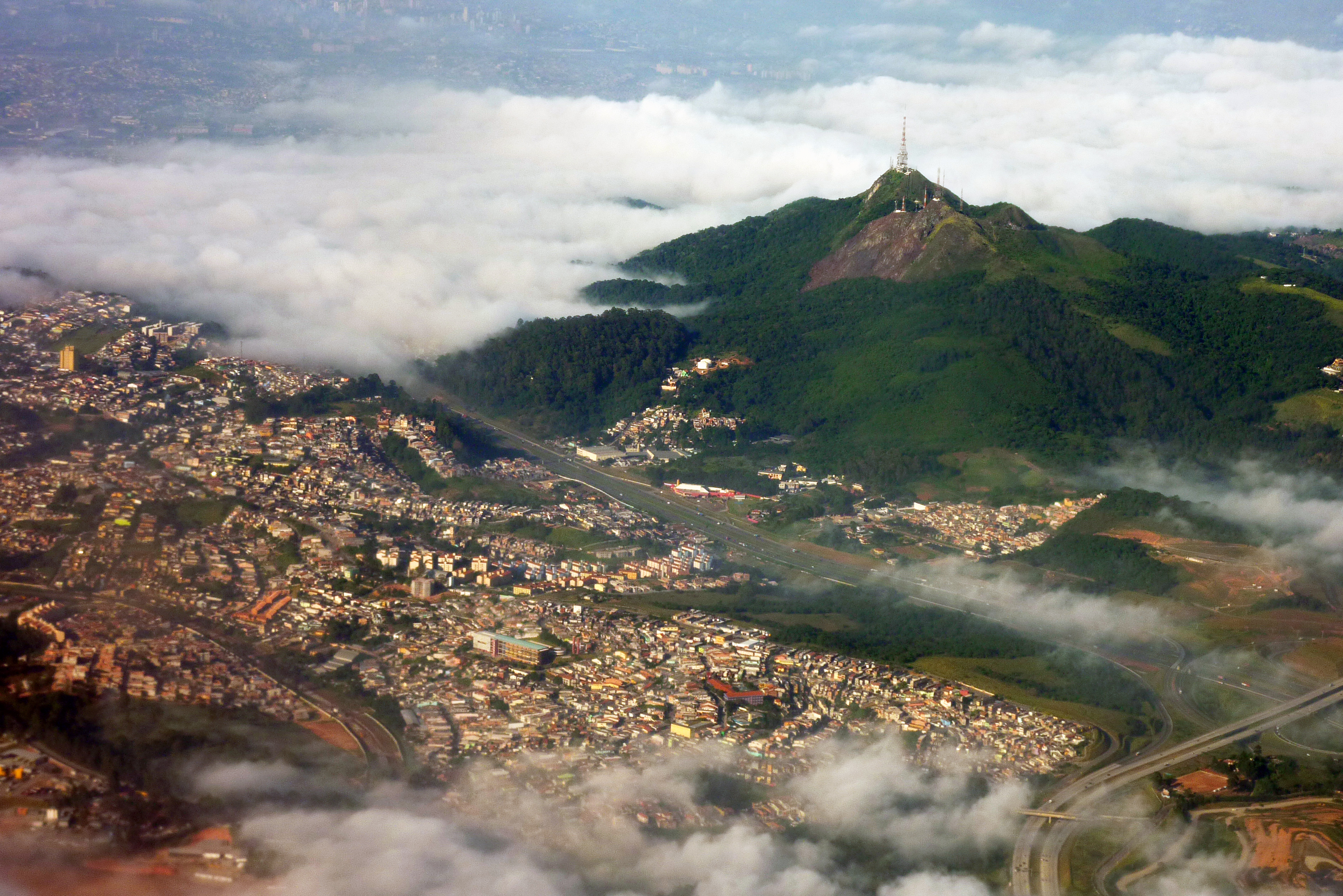
Aerial photo of Jaraguá Peak

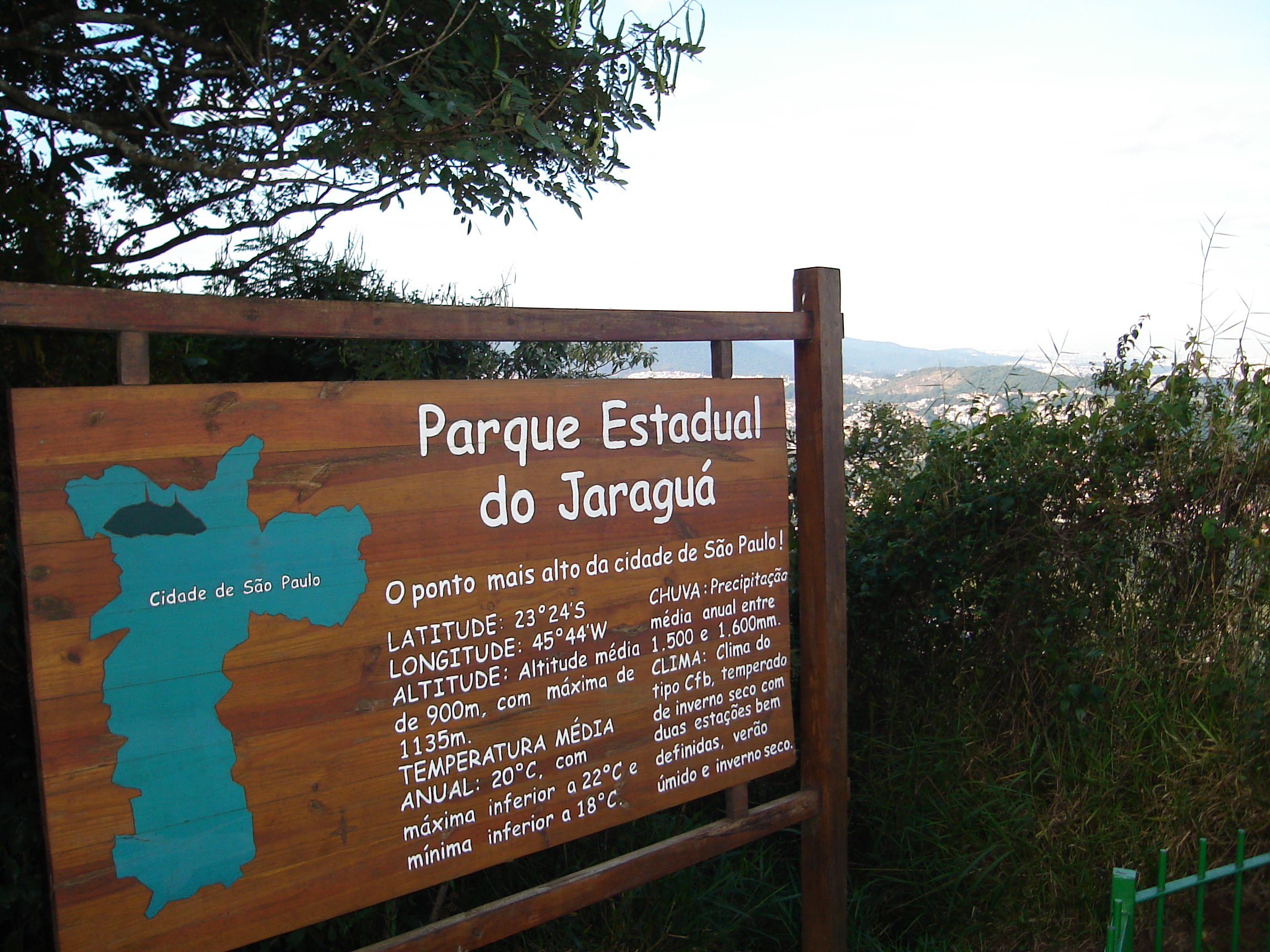
Peak viewpoint.

Forest next to the trail.

The Jaraguá-Itu village began in the 1960s with the arrival of the family of Joaquim Augusto Martins and his wife, Jandira Augusta Venício (now cacique) and is subdivided into the "lower part" and the "upper part". The lower and older one is the home of Cacique Jandira with her children, daughters-in-law, sons-in-law and grandchildren and is a historic site where gold was once mined. The "upper part", called Tekoa Pyau, is still unregulated in the name of the indigenous people and hosts 160 people, 53 of whom are children.

In 1997, the village was visited by the sertanista Orlando Villas-Bôas, who took some natives to a local school, gave a lecture, told many stories and answered questions from the students. The village maintains the Guarani language and customs and survives on handicrafts.

=== Trails ===
The park has several trails, such as the Pai Zé Trail, which leads to the top through the Atlantic vegetation, the Bica Trail and the Silence Trail (specially developed and installed for walks with senior citizens and people with special needs). There is a 5,356-meter-long paved road called Jaraguá Tourist Road that leads to the peak from the Anhanguera highway.

== See also ==
- Tourism in the city of São Paulo
- Jaraguá Peak
- Serra da Cantareira
