= Pico do Jaraguá =

Mountain in São Paulo, Brazil

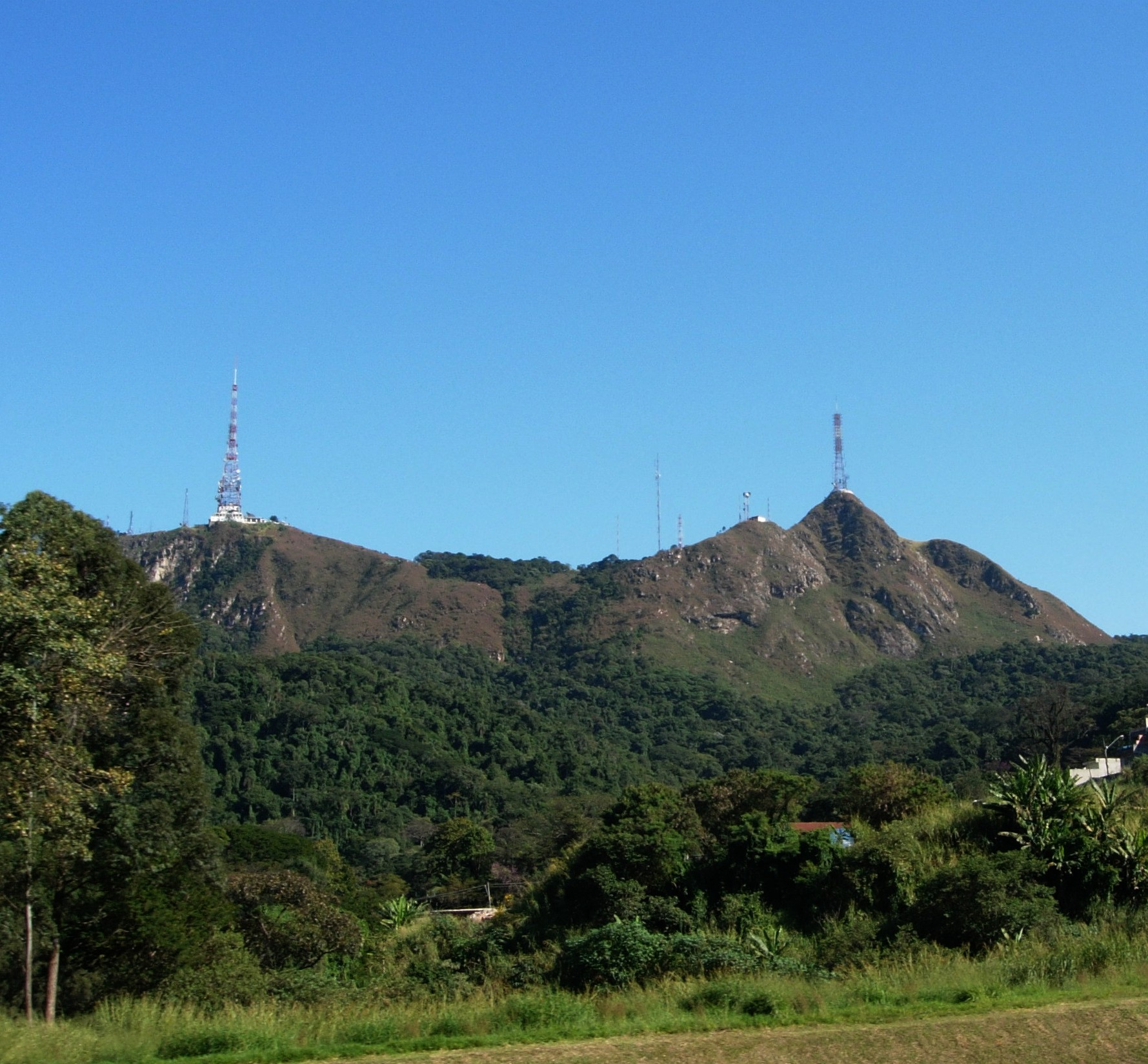
- Pico do Jaraguá

Highest point
- Elevation: 1,135 m (3,724 ft)
- Listing: List of mountains in Brazil
- Coordinates: 23°27′30″S 46°45′55″W

Geography
- Location within Brazil
- Location: State of São Paulo, Brazil
- Parent range: Serra da Cantareira

Climbing
- Easiest route: "Trilha da Bica" and "Trilha do Pai Zé"

Pico do Jaraguá (Jaraguá Peak) is the highest mountain in the Brazilian city of São Paulo, at 1135 metres above sea level, located at the Serra da Cantareira. Jaraguá means Lord of the Valley in Tupi.

== History ==
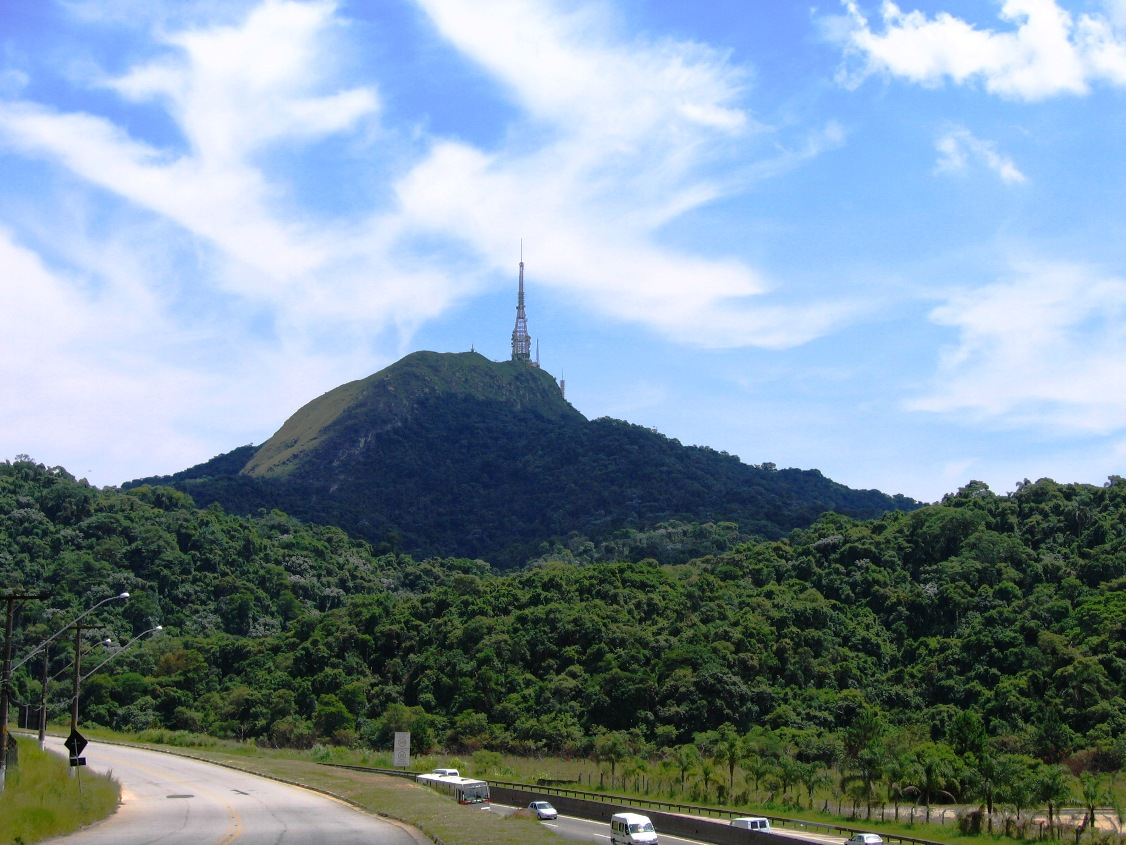
Pico do Jaraguá from Anhangüera Highway.

In 1580, Afonso Sardinha was settled on the mountain, and found gold there. However, due to the indigenous people who lived there at that time, the mining only began ten years later, after numerous wars. The gold was explored until it was not possible to find it any more, by the 19th century.

In 1961, the Jaraguá State Park was created. Soon, TV Globo, Bandeirantes and TV Cultura were allowed to build their TV transmitting masts on the mountain. A 130-metre (430 ft) mast was placed on the highest peak, through a Globo-Bandeirantes partnership, while TV Cultura had its mast build on the nearby lower peak.

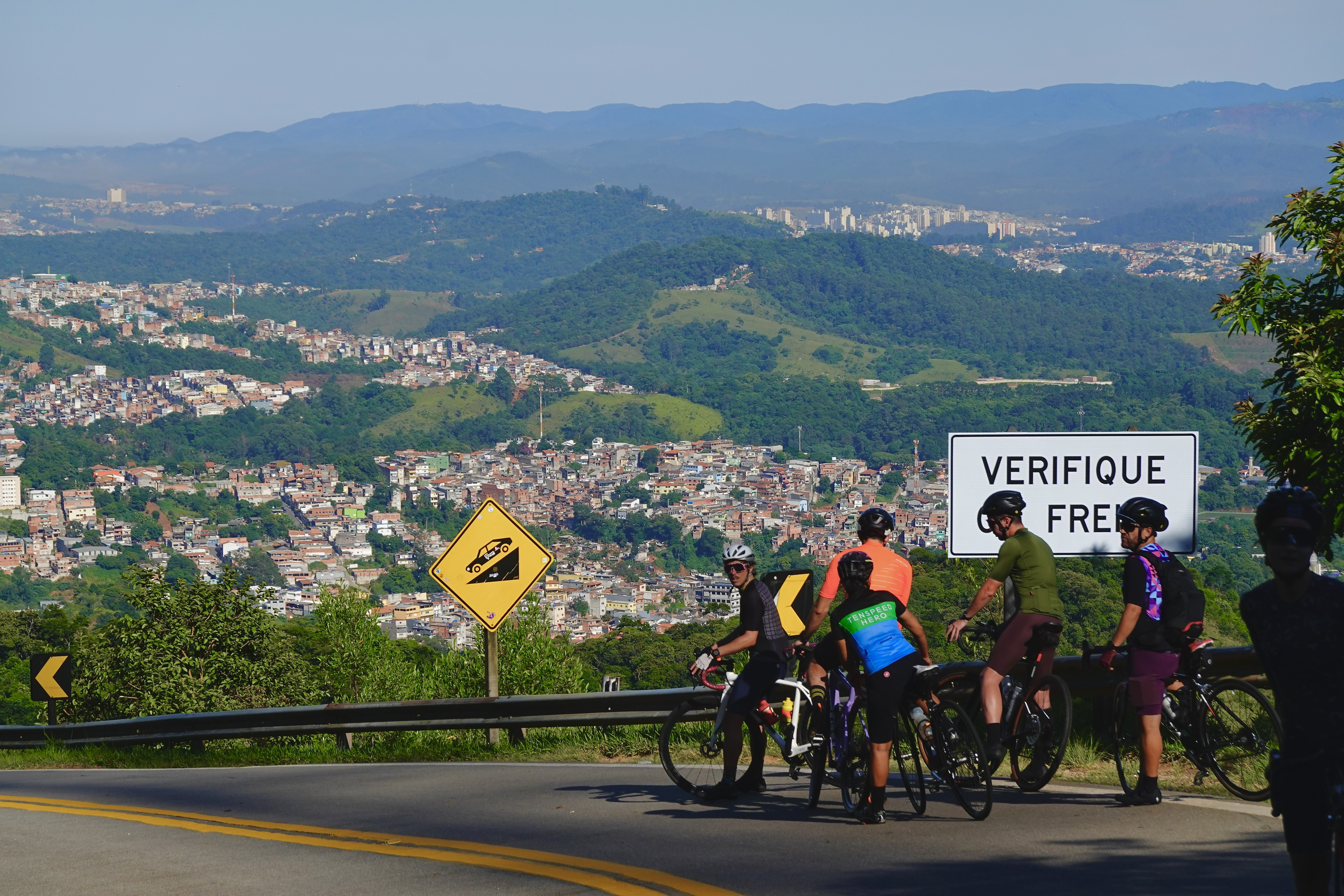
A road cycling group preparing for the descending the Jaraguá Peak in São Paulo, Brazil.

By 1994, the Jaraguá State Park was nominated for World Heritage Site by UNESCO.
