= Beco do Batman =

Beco do Batman Rua Gonçalo Afonso, Rua Medeiros de Albuquerque
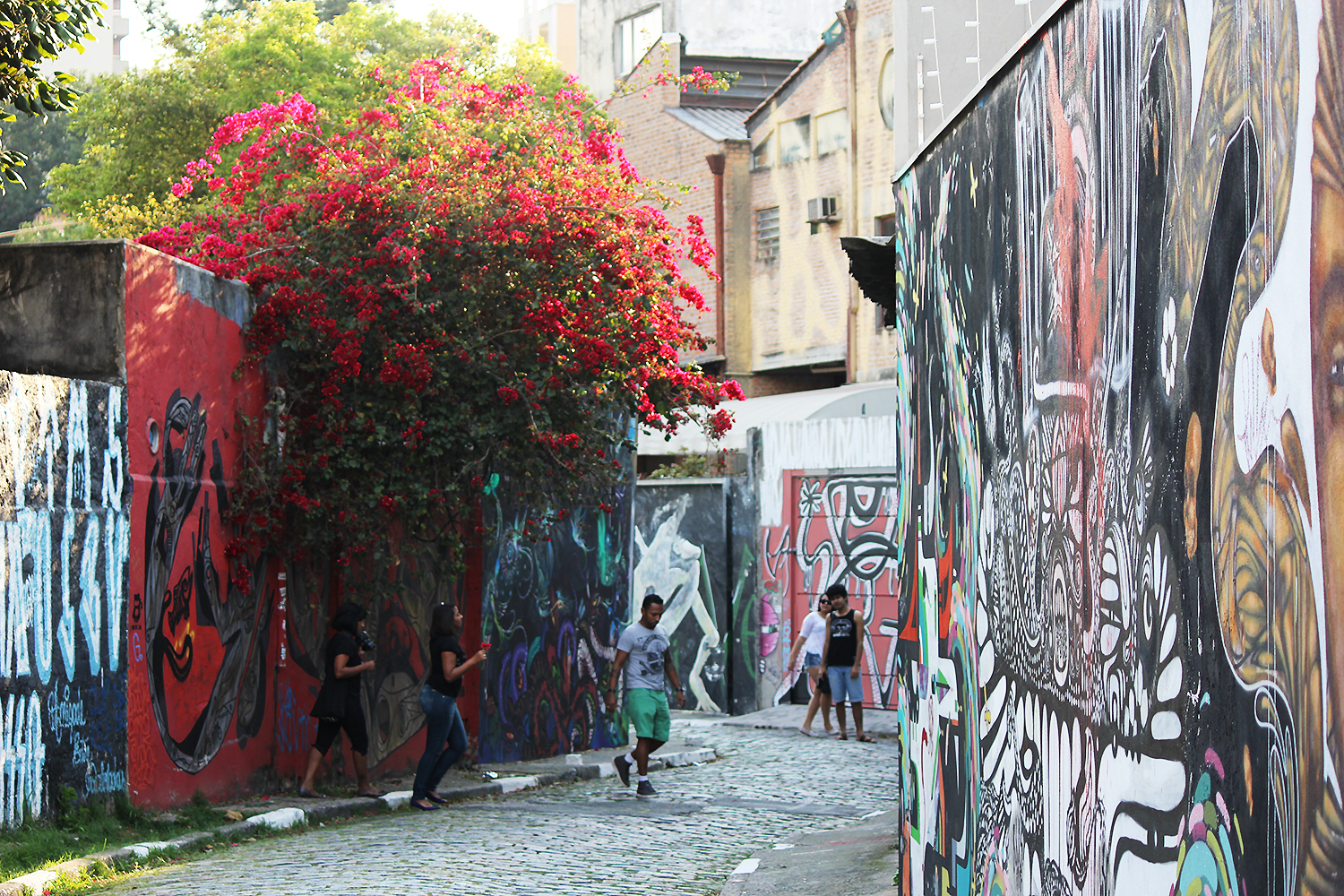
- Interactive map of Beco do Batman
- Coordinates: 23.556541°S 46.686587°W
- Country: Brazil
- State: São Paulo
- Municipality: São Paulo
- District: Pinheiros
- Neighborhood: Vila Madalena

Beco do Batman (English: Batman's Alley) is the nickname for the area around Rua Gonçalo Afonso and Rua Medeiros de Albuquerque in the Vila Madalena neighborhood of São Paulo, Brazil. Beco do Batman is a popular tourist destination because of the dense concentration of graffiti that line the streets.

== History of Beco do Batman ==
The nickname for the area is attributed to a graffito of the DC Comics character Batman which was painted on one of the walls in the 1980s. Local art students began filling the walls with other psychedelic and cubist influenced designs.

Vila Madalena received thousands of tourists during the 2014 FIFA World Cup and there was a corresponding rise in reported incidents of robbery and assault in and around Beco do Batman during the period (2013–2014).

The graffiti of Beco do Batman is now continually renovated and cared for by local community members.

== Gallery ==
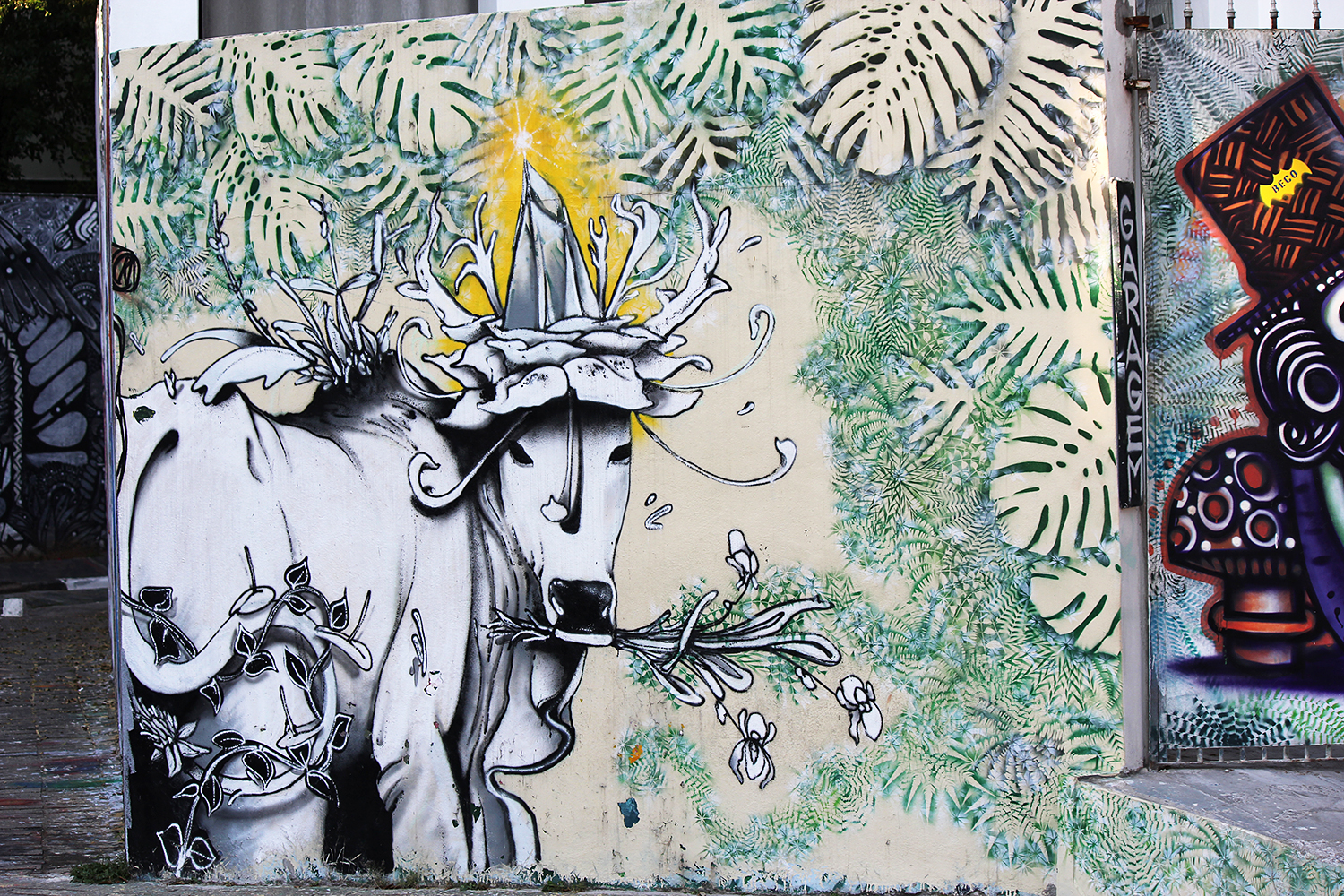

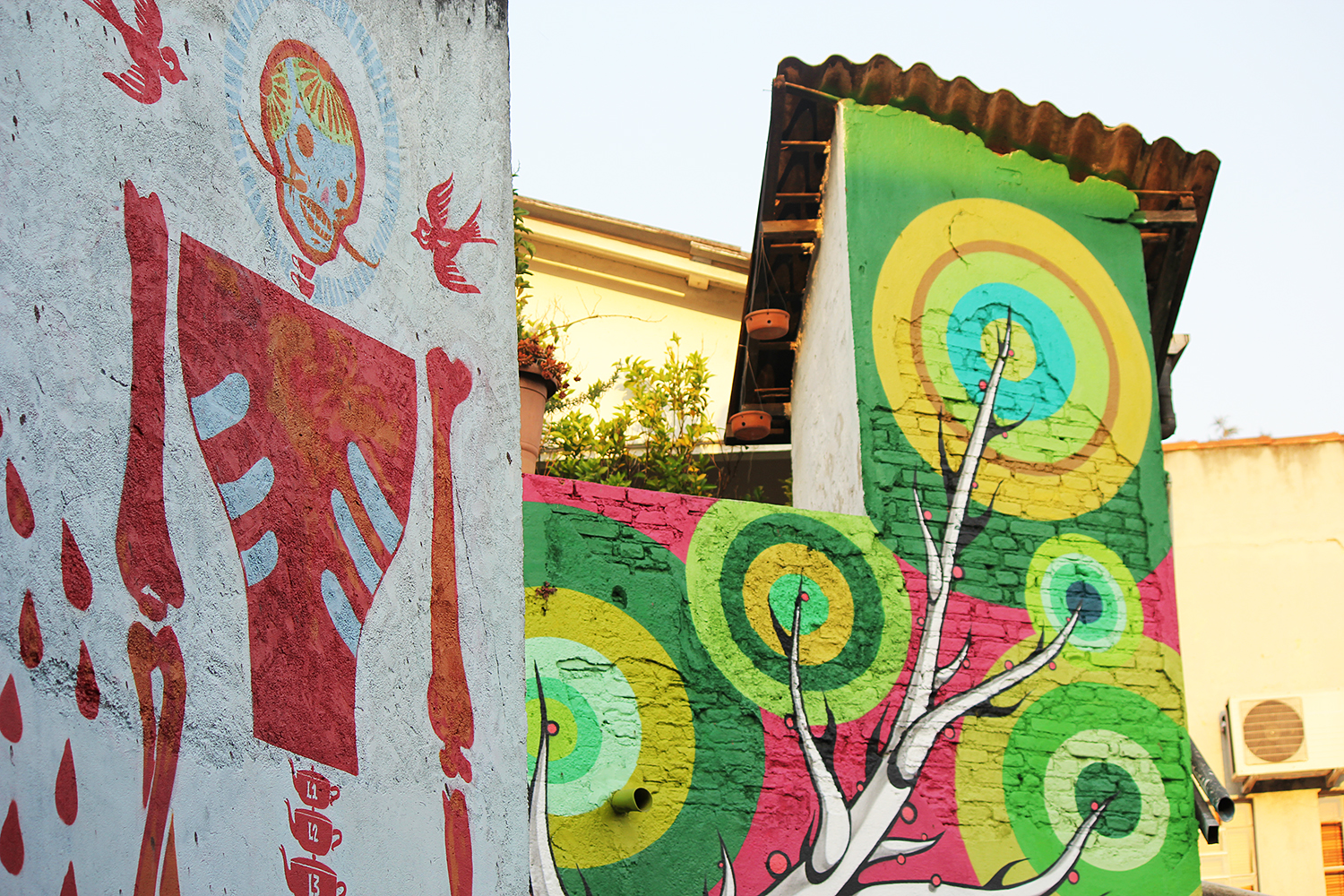

== See also ==
- Vila Madalena
- Os Gêmeos
