= People's Park (São Paulo) =

Park in São Paulo, Brazil

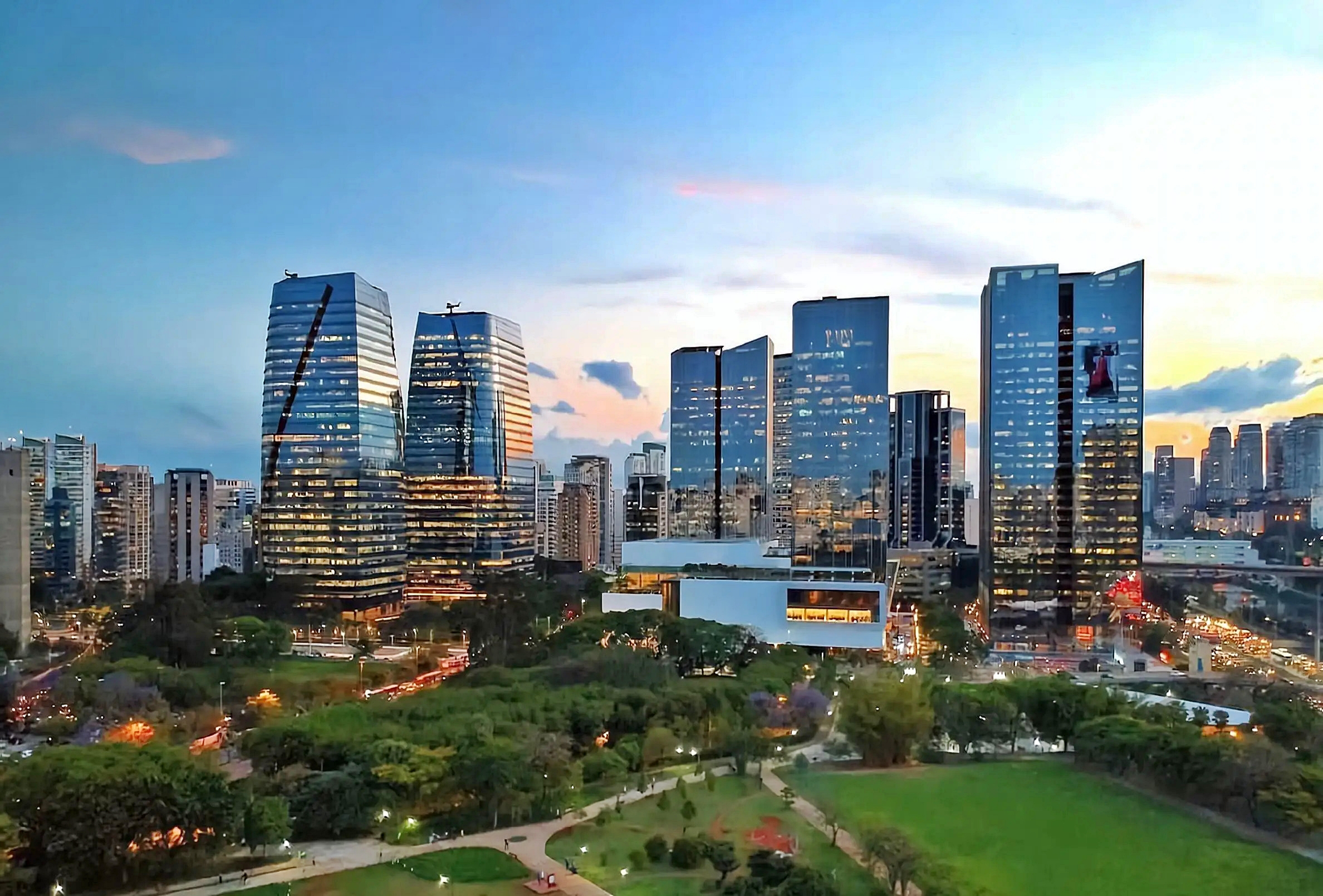
- People's Park

- Location within São Paulo Location within Brazil
- Nearest city: São Paulo
- Coordinates: 23°35′16″S 46°41′19″W
- Area: 133,547 square metres (1,437,490 sq ft)
- Created: 2008

The Mário Pimenta Camargo Municipal Park, or People's Park, was inaugurated on 28 September 2008, in the district of Itaim Bibi, in the district of Chácara Itaim, in São Paulo, Brazil. The People's Park is referred to as the "Parque do Povo" in Portuguese.

== The park ==
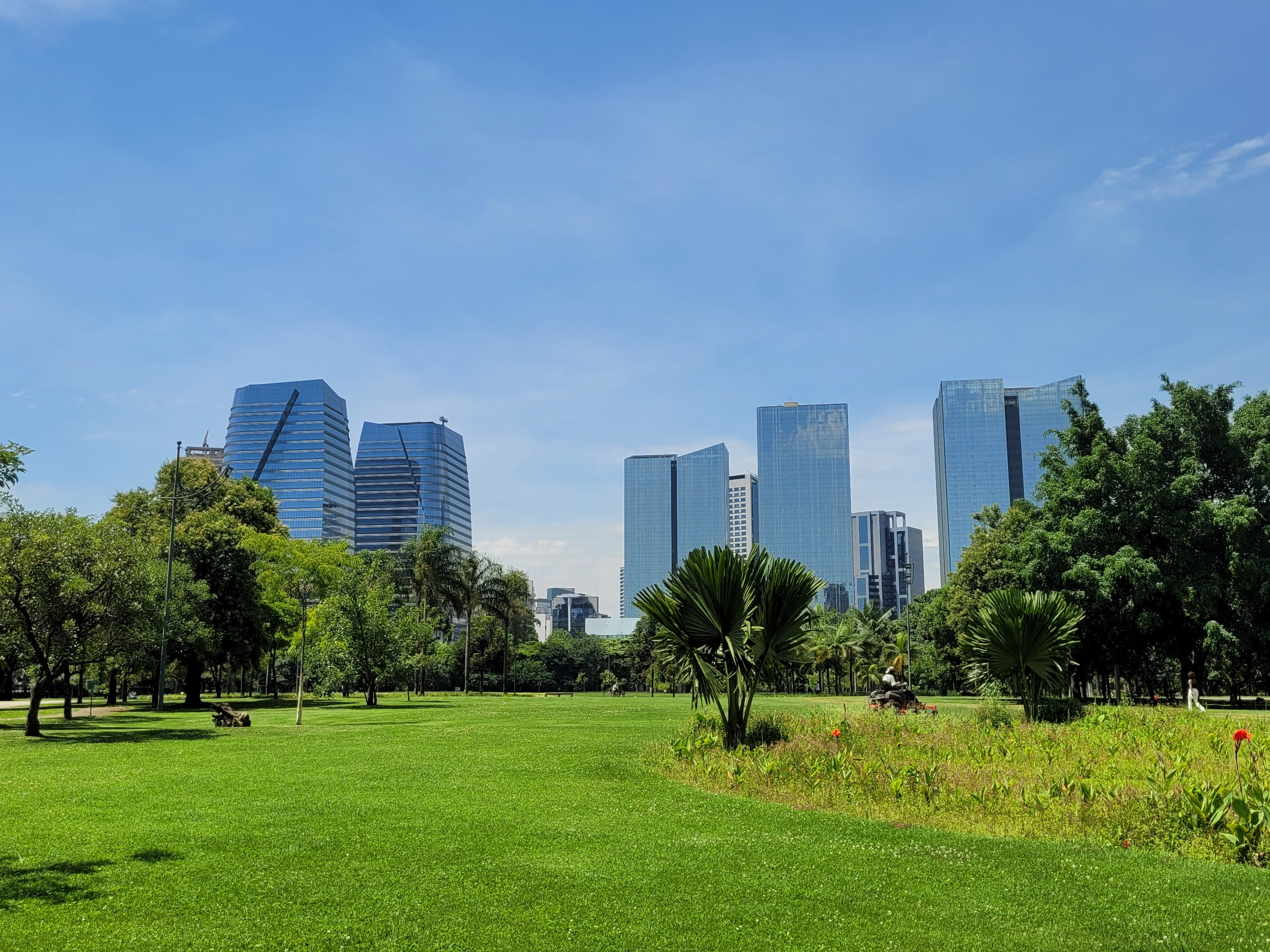
Parque do Povo and the numerous modern buildings that surround it

It is an area of 133,547 square metres (1,437,490 sq ft) that counts on a sports complex of three multisports courts with special marking for paralympic sports, green grass soccer field, cycling track skateboarding, walking, running track, a real-life chess game in which people can move the huge pieces in a checkered board on the ground, track and exercise equipment for the public to enjoy. In the grand open area of the lawn that is located in the central part, it is possible to sunbathe or picnic in the middle of the trees.

The Sensitive Garden, which has aromatic herbs, gives the public the opportunity to smell, touch or even taste some of the delicacies that grow in the garden, such as mustard, coriander, green odor, chives, aloe and basil. The place has full accessibility for people with reduced mobility, made with materials recovered from demolitions carried out by the city for the construction of its sidewalks, such as the recyclable waste of buildings found in the central region of the city of São Paulo.

== Fauna and flora ==
The place has an advantageous amount of greenery, full of nature all around. In terms of bird species typical of open environments alone, more than 37 types can be found, such as the scissor-tailed hummingbird, the woodpecker, the great kiskadee, the thrush, and the tico-tico. In the treetops or when flying overhead, you can see the great macaw, the tuim, the coconut tanager, the ferreirinho-relógio, the alegrinho and the pitiguari. As for plants, there are 32 species distributed in themed sets composed of native and exotic fruit trees, hardwoods and climbing plants, among which the grumixama and the brazilwood are endangered.

== See also ==
- Villa-Lobos State Park
