= The Artistic-Cultural Collection of the Governmental Palaces of the State of São Paulo =

The Artistic-Cultural Collection of the Governmental Palaces of the State of São Paulo, Brazil (Portuguese: Acervo Artístico-Cultural dos Palácios do Governo do Estado de São Paulo), aims to document, preserve and divulge circa 4,000 works of art of great artistic and cultural significance, which belong to the state's heritage. These works of art are located in the historical buildings of the Palácio dos Bandeirantes (Bandeirantes Palace, which is the seat of the government of São Paulo and the governor’s official residence), the Palácio do Horto (Horto Palace, the summer residence), in the city of São Paulo, and the Palácio Boa Vista (Boa Vista Palace, the winter residence), in Campos do Jordão.

The first pieces of the collection were acquired in the late Sixties, praising specially Brazilian art paintings, Baroque imagery, and artistic furniture, eclectic styles of chinaware, silver works and ornamental objects. Since then, new acquisitions have been made either by contests or donations.

The Artistic-Cultural Collection of the Paulist Palaces, as an institution that preserves the public heritage, promotes the public access to works of art of significant importance to the History of Brazilian art through exhibitions of paintings, sculptures, drafts, prints and objects. By doing this, the Collection intends to widen the production of artistic knowledge, promoting workshops with artists, guided tours, seminars and lectures on the exhibitions' themes.

== Some works of art in the Collection ==
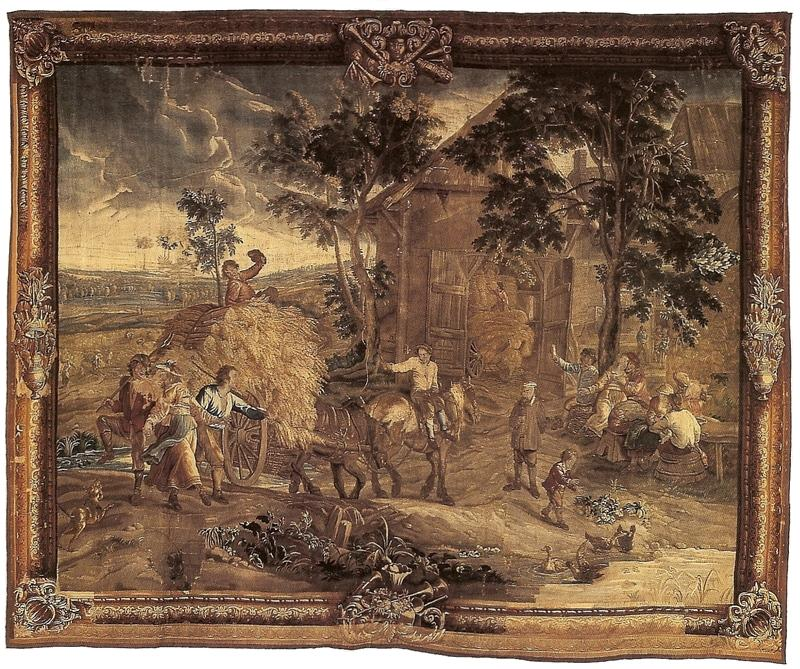
Manufatura de Flandres: A Volta da Colheita, 17th century.

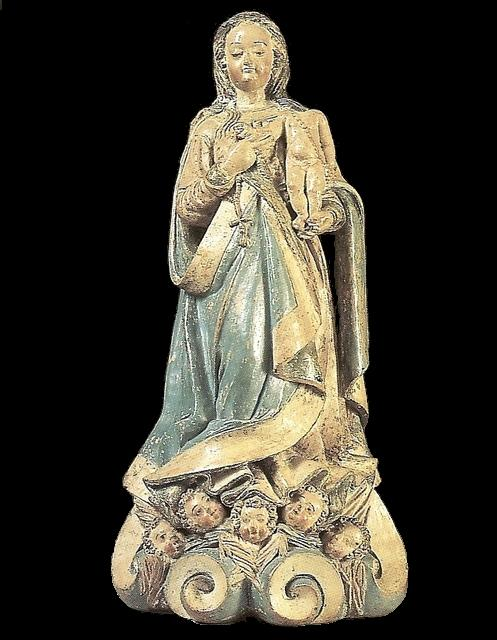
Frei Agostinho de Jesus: Nossa Senhora do Rosário, 17th century.

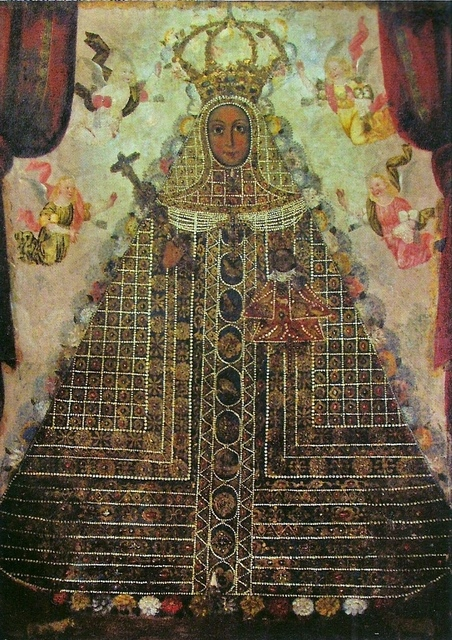
Escola Cusquenha: Nossa Senhora de Guadalupe, 18th century.

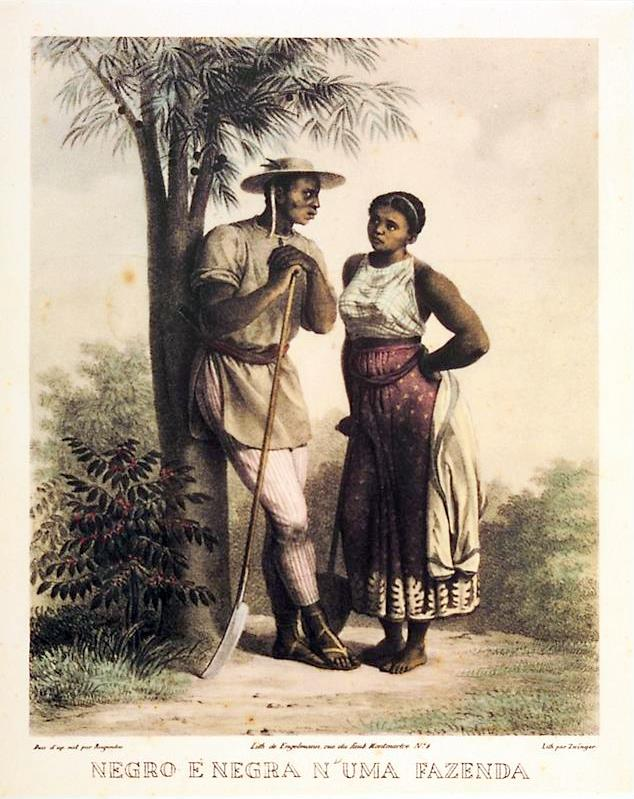
Johann Moritz Rugendas: Negro e Negra N'uma Fazenda, 19th century.

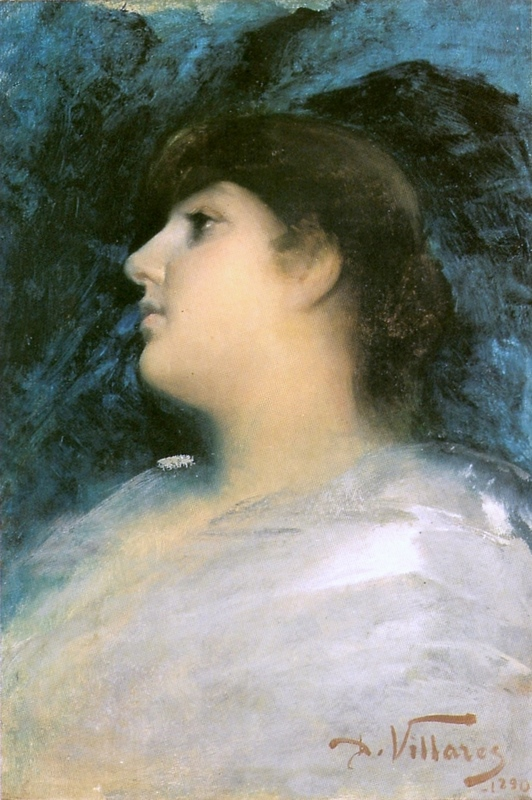
Décio Villares: Figura de Mulher, 1890.

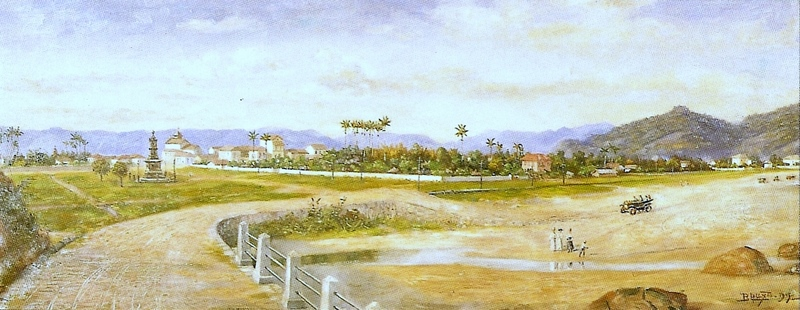
Benedito Calixto: Paisagem (Itanhaém), 1919

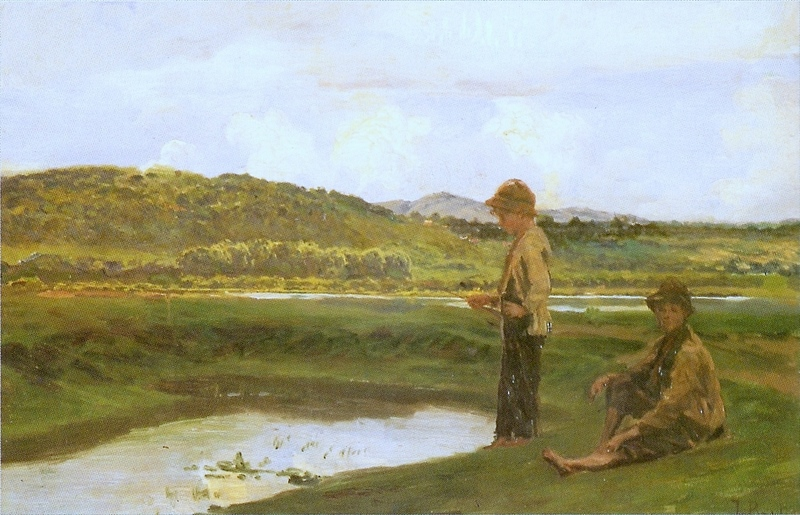
João Batista da Costa: Paisagem com Dois Meninos, s.d.

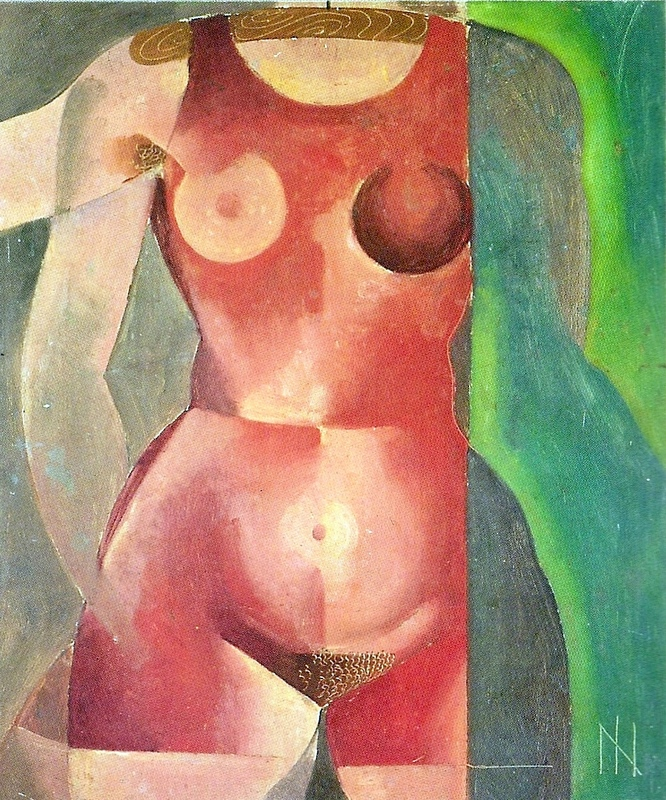
Ismael Nery: Nu no Cabide, c. 1927.
