= Rio–São Paulo high-speed rail =

Planned high-speed rail project in Brazil

Rio-São Paulo High-speed Rail

Overview
- Status: Planning
- Owner: Government of Brazil
- Termini: Barão de Mauá, Rio de Janeiro; Água Branca, São Paulo
- Stations: 9

Service
- Type: High-speed rail
- Operator(s): TAV Brasil
- Rolling stock: 45 sets of 10/20-car high-speed trains

History
- Planned opening: 2032

Technical
- Line length: 417 km (259 mi)
- Track gauge: 1,435 mm (4 ft 8 1/2 in)
- Electrification: Overhead line, 25 kV 50 Hz AC
- Operating speed: 320 km/h (200 mph)
- Signalling: ERTMS-2
- Train protection system: ETCS
- Maximum incline: 3.5%

The Rio–São Paulo High-Speed Rail (Portuguese: Trem de Alta Velocidade Rio-São Paulo; Abbreviation: TAV RJ-SP) is a planned high-speed rail project to connect São Paulo and Rio de Janeiro. While originally planned to be operational by 2014 in time for the 20th FIFA World Cup, to be held in Brazil at a cost of $9 billion, as of May 2015 formal bidding for the project had yet to start, with the Brazilian government delaying the auction by "at least" one year in August 2013, pushing back hopes of completion to at least the 2020s.

In 2023, TAV Brasil received authorization for the planning, construction and operation of the new high-speed line, with a redesigned project, removing the São Paulo-Campinas branch and airport stations from the project and moving the São Paulo and Rio stations from the city center. Later in September, CEO of TAV Brasil stated that this change was reverted. Rio de Janeiro station returned to the old Barão de Mauá station (currently closed) and São Paulo station was moved to Água Branca station.

== Project history ==
The original project, named Expresso Bandeirantes, was to build a high-speed rail line between São Paulo and Campinas. The project was canceled in 2007 because the Brazilian government concluded that it was more viable to connect Campinas, São Paulo and Rio de Janeiro with a single line 518 kilometres (322 mi) long.

On December 7, 2009, the federal government announced the scoring criteria for bids, with 70% for the cost of building the project and 30% for ticket pricing.

On July 2, 2010, it was announced that the line is now not expected to open before late 2016. It is hoped that the joint-venture, comprising the government and winning consortium, will be created during 2011.

On early April, 2011, the government relented to requests from interested consortia to postpone the bid. The argument of the foreign technology suppliers was that they hadn't found interested construction contractors yet. It was then rescheduled for July 29.

By July 29, 2011, no consortium had submitted a proposal in the ceremony of bidding envelopes delivery. Only the foreign technology suppliers attended the event arguing that no Brazilian contractors showed interest in investing in the project of construction of the railroad, a condition of bidding documents. The government then declared not to have given up on the project, with intentions to launch a new call for bids. This time the intention was to divide the bid into two parts: one for choosing the supplier of technology and one for choosing the railway constructors.

On December 17, 2011, the government announced the completion of the new invitation for bids. The filing date of the new document was set for January 10, 2012, but again delayed in August 2013.

In 2020, Governor of Rio de Janeiro Wilson Witzel stated that he's willing to resume the planning for the high-speed service soon. Later in March, Hyperloop TT announced that the company has plans to implement a hyperloop railway line in Brazil, which would be able to connect São Paulo and Rio de Janeiro in 25 minutes if implemented. As of 2025, the project to construct a high-speed rail line with a 1 hour and 25 minute travel time is being undertaken by TAV Brasil.

== Route ==
| Lines | Terminals | Stations | Main Destinations | Duration of Travel (min) | Headway (min) | Entry into Service |
|---|---|---|---|---|---|---|
| TAV; Rio-SP | Estaçao Leopoldina, Rio de Janeiro ↔ São Paulo | 9 | Rio de Janeiro, São Paulo | Rio-SP: 1h 24min | - | − |

=== São Paulo–Campinas route ===
The proposed bullet train project was presented to the city by Helio de Oliveira Santos (PDT), mayor of Campinas, in Brasília, to be built by the Japanese consortium within five years (ready for the World Cup in 2014). Campinas is ahead in the construction because it is the first city to pave the way for the train by completing its new Multimodal Passenger Terminal in June 2008. However, the tendering procedures would not begin until February 2009, when over 28 major world manufacturers participated in a contest for related projects. The Japanese consortium presented its proposal based on the Shinkansen, which carried 340 million passengers the previous year on 2100 km of track. It is made up of the Japanese companies Mitsui, Mitsubishi, Kawasaki and Toshiba. The consortium has already submitted a preliminary proposal in Brasília and São Paulo and Rio for interested entrepreneurs.

The preliminary proposal is for five different types of rail service in which the trains would travel at speeds of up to 320 km/h. There would be three express services and two slower ones, each hourly, carrying up to 3,000 passengers. However, the competition for the building includes manufacturers from Spain, South Korea, Italy, France, Germany, Japan and China.

=== Rio–São Paulo route ===
The first stretch of high-speed train line in Brazil will be between its main cities of Rio de Janeiro and São Paulo. The distance of 412 km between the two city terminals: Água Branca in São Paulo and the Estaçao Leopoldina station in Rio de Janeiro, to be covered in one hour and twenty-five minutes at a maximum speed of 360 km/h.

It is tentatively planned that the trains will have a capacity of 855 passengers at a headway of 15 minutes. The fare will be around R$150 to R$250 per passenger in the off-peak hours. There are several projects presented to the Brazilian government. One is the Italian design company's Italplan Engineering Environment & Transport Srl, whose proposal envisaged the high-speed train starting operations in 2015. If this target date had been met it would have served as a quick and vital link to São Paulo in time for the 2016 Summer Olympics.

== Specifications ==
- Length: 417 kilometres (259 mi)
- Estimated cost: R$ 50 billion (US$ 9.73 billion)
- Operational line speed: 320 km/h
- Designed line speed: 350 km/h
- Time between Rio-São Paulo: 1 hour, 24 minutes
- Estimated passengers: 71 million per year
- Estimated one-way ticket price: ?
- Gauge: 1,435 mm (4 ft 8 1/2 in)
- Voltage: 25 kV AC overhead line

== Other connecting lines ==
On May 13, 2008, it was reported that a high-speed line between Belo Horizonte and Curitiba would be included in the National Transport Plan. It would link Belo Horizonte, Divinópolis, Varginha and Poços de Caldas (all in the state of Minas Gerais); Campinas, São Paulo, Sorocaba, Itapetininga and Apiaí (all in the state of São Paulo); and Curitiba (in the state of Paraná). The line would be around 1,150 kilometres long, about twice the length of the line between Rio de Janeiro and Campinas. The resultant network, centred on São Paulo, would serve an area containing more than half of Brazil's economic output and population. The line is scheduled to be built after the completion of the line between Rio de Janeiro, São Paulo, and Campinas.

== See also ==
- Railway stations in Brazil
