= Expresso Pequi =

Expresso Brasília-Goiânia

Overview
- Locale: Brasília, Federal District; Goiânia, Goiás
- Stations: 4

Service
- Type: Commuter rail, regional rail, intercity rail

History
- Planned opening: Unknown

Technical
- Line length: 209 km (130 mi)

Expresso Pequi or Expresso Brasília-Goiânia was a planned rail line linking the Brazilian capital city Brasília with Goiânia. The name Pequi refers to the Caryocar brasiliense fruit which is grown in the region.

== History ==
In 2009, construction of the TAV High-speed railway between Brasília/Anápolis/Goiânia was announced. The construction of the line was expected to be financed by federal funds in partnership with the governments of Goiás and the Federal District, with the goal of developing the area between the two capitals. In 2017, South Korean rail operator AREX proposed a line with a maximum speed of 250 km/h (160 mph) between the two cities.

== Route ==
The 209 km (130 mi) route would allow a journey time of 1 hour 30 minutes between Brasília and Goiânia, with intermediate stations at Alexânia and Anápolis.

== See also ==
- High-speed rail in Brazil
- Trens Intercidades
