= Trens Intercidades =

Rail network in Brazil

Trem Intercidades
Overview
- Service type: Commuter rail; Regional rail; Inter-city rail
- Status: Under construction
- Locale: São Paulo Metropolitan Area
- Current operator: TIC Trens (Campinas branch)

Route
- Termini: Água Branca (Intercity); Jundiaí (Intermetropolitan); Americana (Intercity); Campinas (Intermetropolitan)
- Stops: 2 (Intercity); 3 (Intermetropolitan)
- Distance travelled: 136 km (85 mi) (Intercity); 44 km (27 mi) (Intermetropolitan)
- Average journey time: 1 hour, 15 minutes (Intercity)
- Service frequency: 15 minutes (Intercity)

On-board services
- Class: Standard class only
- Disabled access: Fully accessible
- Catering facilities: At-seat meals

Technical
- Track gauge: 1,600 mm (5 ft 3 in)
- Electrification: Overhead line, 3,000 V DC
- Operating speed: 160 km/h (99 mph); 120 km/h (75 mph)

Trens Intercidades (TIC) is a four line regional rail network proposed by the government of the State of São Paulo in Brazil, linking the city of São Paulo with Jundiaí, Campinas, São José dos Campos, Sorocaba and Santos.

== Background ==
In 2010, São Paulo state government showed off a project to build up 4 regional intercity train routes connecting the area surrounding São Paulo with high population cities close by, which today rely exclusively on intercity buses that are almost completely saturated and running at absurdly short intervals at full capacity. The original plan was for construction to start 2013–2014, but the Brazilian financial crisis that it is suffering since 2015 has put all projects on standby, and the next prediction was for construction to start only by 2025. In 2016 the Brazilian government confirmed it was seeking South Korean assistance with the development of a São Paulo regional rail network and in 2019, the cost was estimated at R$ 20 billion.

== Lines ==
=== São Paulo to Sorocaba ===
The first line could depart from Água Branca interchange station in São Paulo and end in Sorocaba, a 500.000 inhabitants city about 100 km west of São Paulo, stopping midway at São Roque and a populous neighborhood of Sorocaba, Brigadeiro Tobias. The complete journey could take around 50 minutes

=== São Paulo to Santos ===
The second line could depart from the to-be-built São Carlos interchange station in São Paulo and head to Santos, a 430.000 inhabitants city 50 km south of São Paulo, in the coast, which an important beach town as well as Brazil's most important freight port. The train will stop in 2 cities along the way. The complete journey could take around 35 minutes.

Options considered for this route included a new 30 km tunnel between Pref. Celso Daniel-Santo André station on Line 10–Turquoise and São Vicente.

=== São Paulo to Campinas and Americana ===
The third, and probably the most talked line, is the line connecting São Paulo's Água Branca interchange station to Jundiaí, Campinas and Americana. Campinas is one of Brazil's largest regional centers, it is just 90 km north of São Paulo, and has its own Metropolitan area with over 3 million inhabitants, Jundiaí is a 400.000 inhabitants city in between them, and Americana is a 200.000 inhabitants city in the north limit of the Campinas Region. The journey from São Paulo to Jundiaí could take 20 minutes, to Campinas around 40 to 50 minutes and Americana just over an hour. On 1 March 2024, CRRC 40% with Grupo Comporte 60% entered at Trens Intercidades Proposal with the possibility to deliver 22 inter-city trains, to be used from Luz Station to Campinas since supposidelly 2030.

=== São Paulo to São José dos Campos ===
The fourth route could leave from the Penha intermodal station and head to São José dos Campos, a 710.000 inhabitants city 100 km east of São Paulo, which is a very important tech center, with the headquarters of Embraer, for example, two public and multiple private universities, and which also possesses a large industrial complex, ranging from automotive and military to chemical and metal-mechanical.

=== Other routes ===
There were also future plans for other important routes such as from Sorocaba to Paulínia, Campinas to Piracicaba and Campinas to Rio Claro.

== See also ==
- São Paulo Metro
- Companhia Paulista de Trens Metropolitanos
- Expresso Pequi
