= Água Branca (CPTM) =

Railway station in São Paulo, Brazil

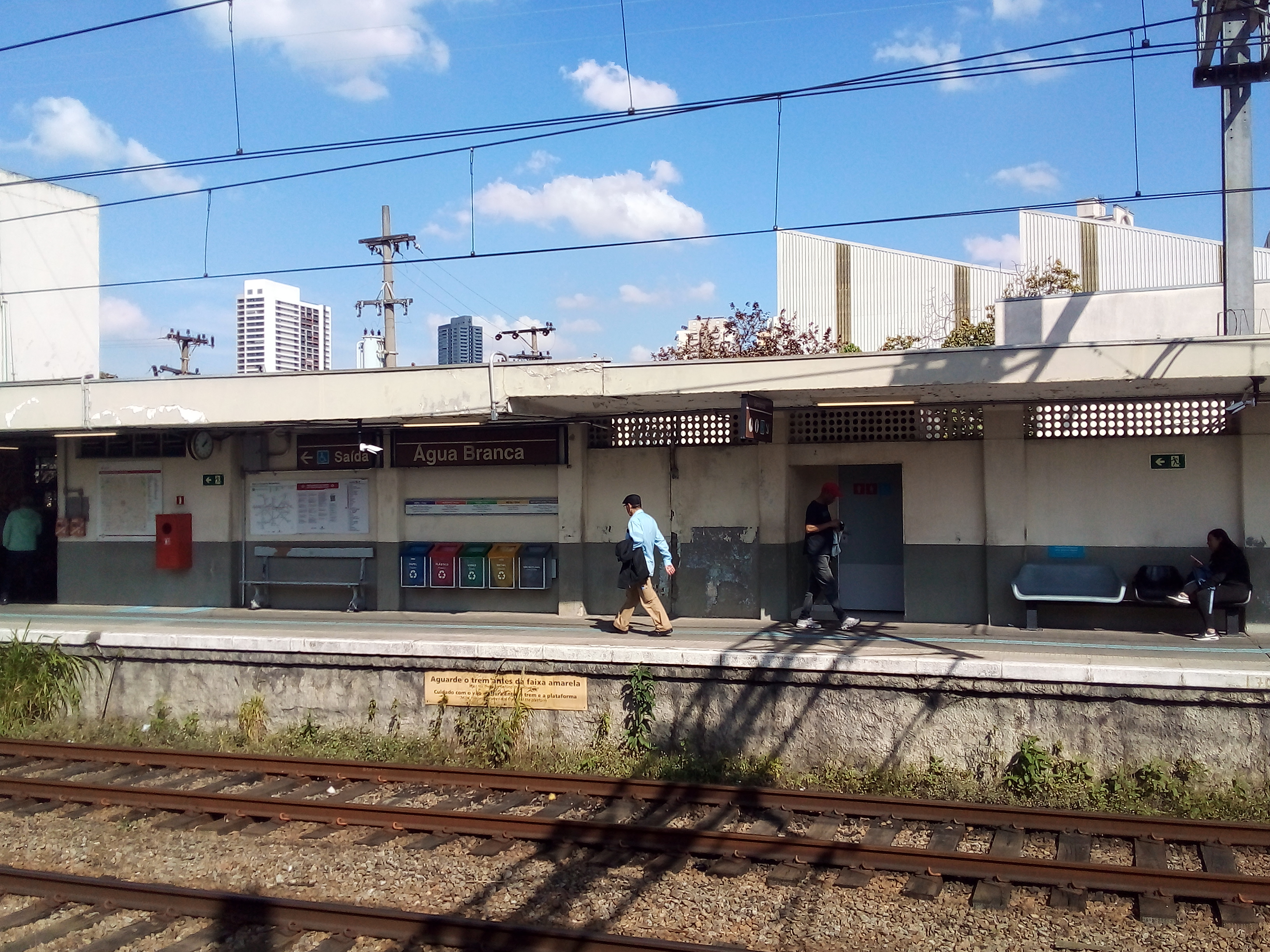
- Station platform

General information
- Location: Av. Santa Marina, s/n Água Branca; Brazil
- Coordinates: 23°31′17″S 46°41′19″W
- Owner: Government of the State of São Paulo
- Operator: TIC Trens (Grupo Comporte)
- Platforms: Side platforms
- Connections: Line 6 (São Paulo Metro)

Construction
- Structure type: At-grade

Other information
- Station code: ABR

History
- Opened: 4 April 1891
- Former names: Agua Branca

Services
Preceding station	São Paulo Metropolitan Trains	Following station
Lapa towards Jundiaí	Line 7	Palmeiras-Barra Funda Terminus
Future services
Lapa towards Amador Bueno	Line 8	Palmeiras-Barra Funda towards Júlio Prestes
Out-of-system interchange
Preceding station	São Paulo Metro	Following station
Santa Marina towards Brasilândia	Line 6 transfer at Água Branca	SESC-Pompeia towards São Joaquim
Track layout
Location

Água Branca is a train station on TIC Trens Line 7-Ruby, in the district of Água Branca in São Paulo, Brazil. In the future, it will be physically connected with São Paulo Metro Line 6-Orange and ViaMobilidade Line 8-Diamond and Regional Trains (São Paulo ↔ Campinas and São Paulo ↔ Sorocaba).

== History ==
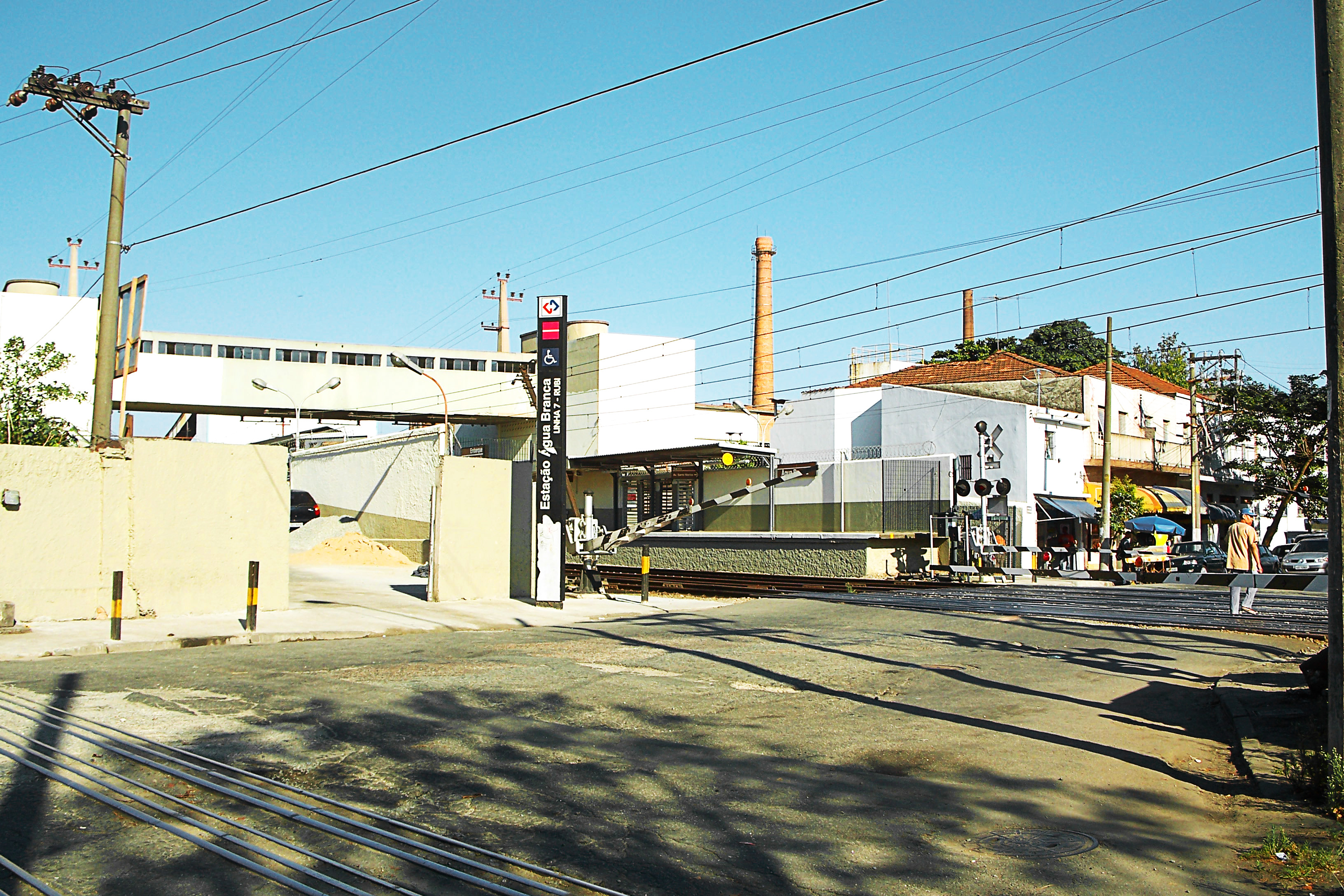
Station entrance next to the Avenida Santa Marina level crossing.

Água Branca station was one of the opened in the opening of Santos-Jundiaí railway by São Paulo Railway, on 14 February 1867. Initially, it was a rustic building. With the opening of Sorocaba Railway, which was parallel to it, Água Branca station, which was far from São Paulo, began to have importance as an integration point and cargo depot between both railways. In 1896, Vidraria Santa Marina was risen next to the station, which contributed to the industrialization of the region, which peaked with the development of the huge industrial complex Indústria Reunidas Fábricas Matarazzo, in 1920 in the station surroundings, attracting even more passengers and cargos for the station.

In the 1890s, SPR reformed many stations, classifying them as first and third classes station. Slowly, the station building was becoming smaller for the growing demand. Another problem faced by the station was Tietê River, which flooded the station yard, interrupting the traffic. With the river rectification, between the 1930s and 1960s, the region began to suffer less with floodings.

With the nationalization of São Paulo Railway, in 1946, the Federal Government signed cooperation contracts with United States, created the Brazil-United States Mixed Committee for Economic Development. Working between 1951 and 1953, the committee established basic parameters for the modernization of Santos–Jundiaí Railway, including its stations. Between mid-1950s and the end of 1960s, many stations were rebuilt, including Água Branca. The new station received large accesses and a new administrative building, opened in the 1960s, having its catwalk opened on 20 October 1976.

In the 1970s, the station was planned to receive the Metro East-West line, but the project wasn't realized. Slowly, the problems with Santos-Jundiaí commuter trains (and its successor, CBTU) grew, and the station went into decay, which peak was reached in the beginning of the 1990s. On 1 June 1994, the station and the line were assumed by the state through the CPTM. Besides it wasn't depredated during the 1996 CPTM riots, the station was closed for 6 months, along with the entire line.

Currently, it is part of TIC Trens Line 7-Ruby.

== Toponymy ==
The Água Branca denomination was created in mid-19th century, to name of the brooks which went through the region. Água Branca Brook is currently channeled under part of Avenida Sumaré and Rua Turiaçu. The current brook under Água Branca station was named Água Preta. The waters of Água Branca Brook run down to Água Preta, which run down to Tietê River.

== Projects ==
CPTM studies the modernization of Água Branca station since its 2003 Director Plan. In 2010, the N&W Arquitetos offices was hired to develop a station hybrid project, to attend the Line 6 project and CPTM future projects, such as São Paulo-Campinas Intercities Train and burial of the railway between Lapa and Brás.
