= Inter-city rail =

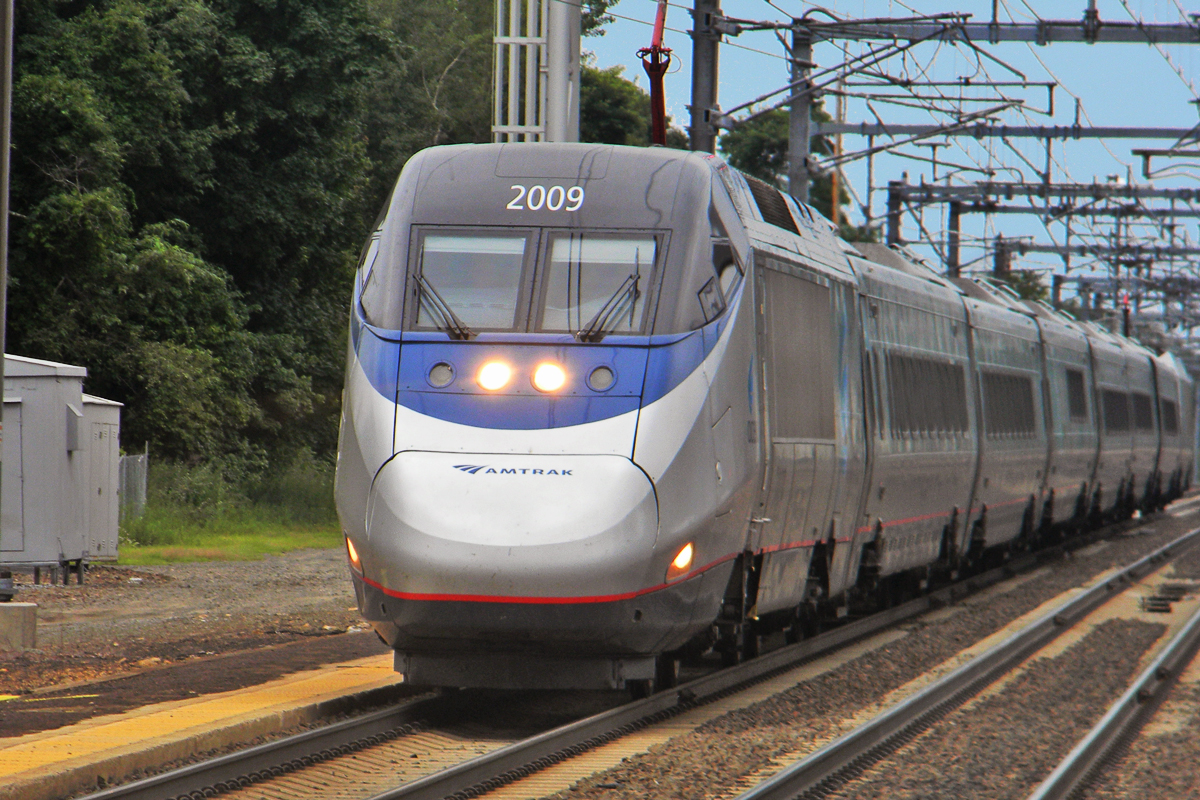
An Acela Express high-speed train traveling on the busy Northeast Corridor between Boston and Washington, D.C. in July 2011

Inter-city rail services are express trains that run services that connect cities over longer distances than commuter or regional trains. They include rail services that are neither short-distance commuter rail trains within a single city area nor slow regional rail trains that stop at every station and serve only local journeys. An intercity train is typically an express train with limited stops and comfortable carriages for long-distance travel.

Inter-city rail sometimes provides international services. This is most prevalent in Europe because of the proximity of its 50 countries to a 10,180,000-square-kilometer (3,930,000-square-mile) area. Eurostar and EuroCity are examples. In many European countries, the word InterCity or Inter-City is an official brand name for a network of regular-interval, relatively long-distance train services that meet certain criteria for speed and comfort. That use of the term appeared in the United Kingdom in the 1960s and has been widely imitated.

== Speed ==
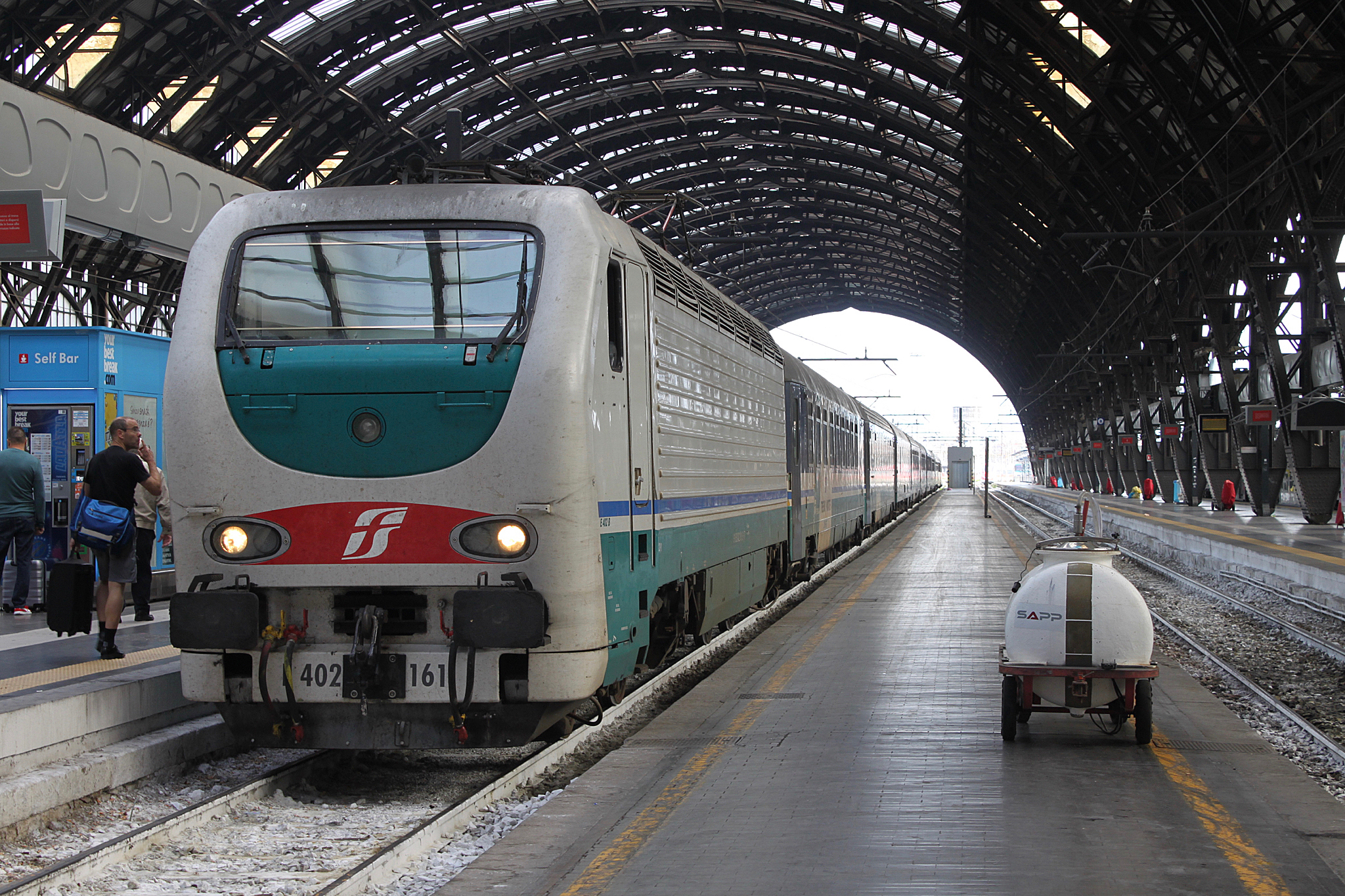
An Italian InterCity train at Milano Centrale railway station

The speeds of inter-city rail lines are quite diverse, ranging from 50 km/h (31 mph) in a mountainous area or on undeveloped tracks to 200–350 km/h (124–217 mph) on newly constructed or improved tracks. As a result, intercity rail may or may not fall into the category of higher-speed rail or high-speed rail. Ideally, the average speed of intercity rail service would exceed 100 km/h (62 mph) to be competitive with cars, buses, and other modes of transport.

=== Distance of inter-city rail ===
- 50–100 km

The distance of an inter-city rail journey is usually at least 50–100 km (30–60 mi), although in many large metropolitan areas, commuter and regional services cover equal or longer distances. Examples of countries with relatively short intercity rail distances with service patterns comparable to regional rail include Belgium, Israel, The Netherlands, and Switzerland.

- 100–500 km

A distance of 100–500 km (60–300 mi) is a common journey distance for inter-city rail in many countries. In many cases, railway travel is most competitive at about two to three hours journey time. Inter-city rail can often compete with highways and short-haul air travel for journeys of this distance. Most major intercity railway routes in Europe, such as London to Birmingham, Paris to Lyon, and Lisbon to Porto, cover this range of distances.

- 500–1,000 km

In journeys of 500–1,000 km (300–600 mi), the role of inter-city rail is often replaced by faster air travel. The development of high-speed rail in some countries increases the share of railway for such longer-distance journeys. The Paris-Marseille TGV (750 km or 466 mi in 3 hours) and Tokyo-Aomori Shinkansen (675 km or 419 mi in 2 hours 59 minutes) are examples of this type of journey. In conventional non-high-speed rail, overnight trains are common for this distance.

- 1,000 km or more

In some countries with dense rail networks, large territories, or limited air and car transport, such as China, India, and Russia, overnight long-distance train services are provided and widely used.

In many other countries, such long-distance rail journey has been replaced by air travel except for tourism or hobbyist purposes, luxury train journeys, or significant cost benefit. Amtrak long-distance services in the United States, Via Rail's Canadian service in Canada, and the Indian Pacific in Australia are examples.

Faster high-speed rail of at least 250 km (160 mi) per hour, such as the Beijing–Shanghai High-Speed Railway in China (1,300 km or 810 mi in 5 hours) and Tokyo-Sapporo in the proposed Hokkaido Shinkansen in Japan (1,030 km or 640 mi in 4 hours), may play a significant role in long-distance travel in the future.

== List of inter-city rail by country ==
=== Africa ===
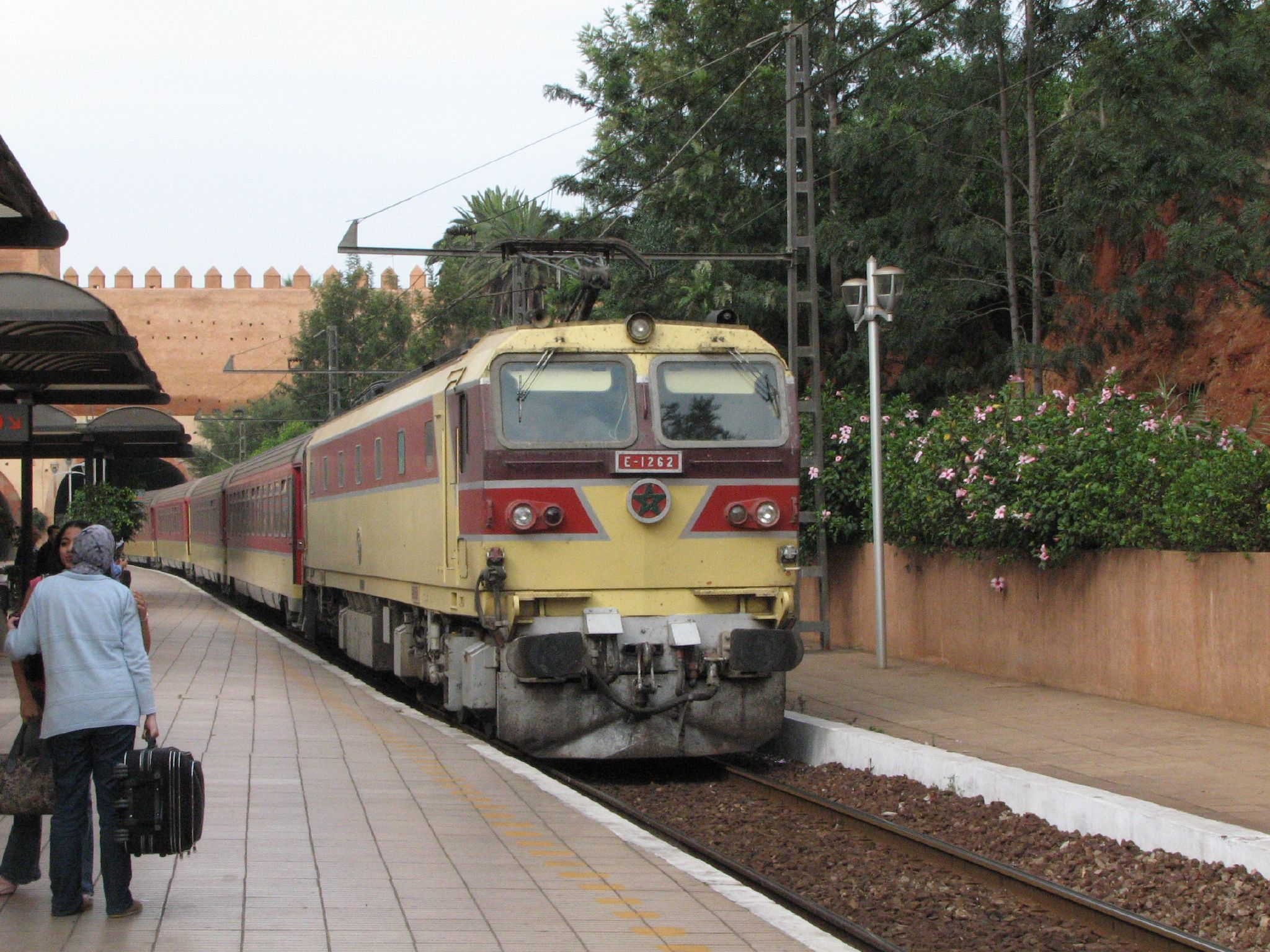
A Moroccan inter-city train at the Rabat station

Railways in Africa are still developing or not practically used for passenger purposes in many countries, but the following countries have inter-city services between major cities:

- Algeria: SNTF
- Egypt: Egyptian National Railways
- Kenya: Mombasa-Nairobi Standard Gauge Railway
- Morocco: ONCF (in French - Office National des Chemins de Fer du Maroc, National Office for Railways of Morocco)
- Nigeria: Nigerian Railway Corporation
- South Africa: Shosholoza Meyl
- Tunisia: Tunisian Railways (SNCFT)

=== Asia ===
==== China ====
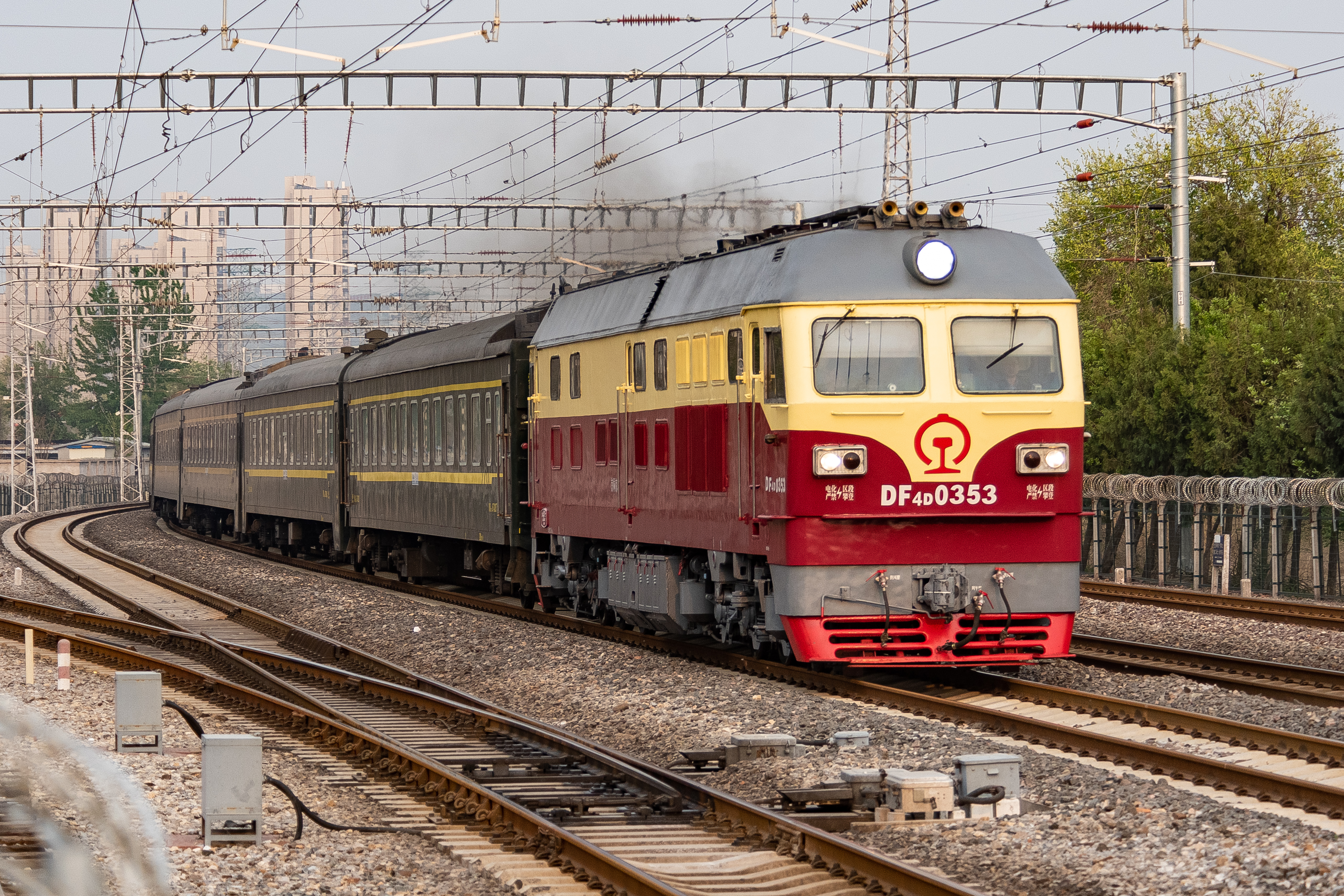
DF4D with 25G passenger cars used for K-series trains

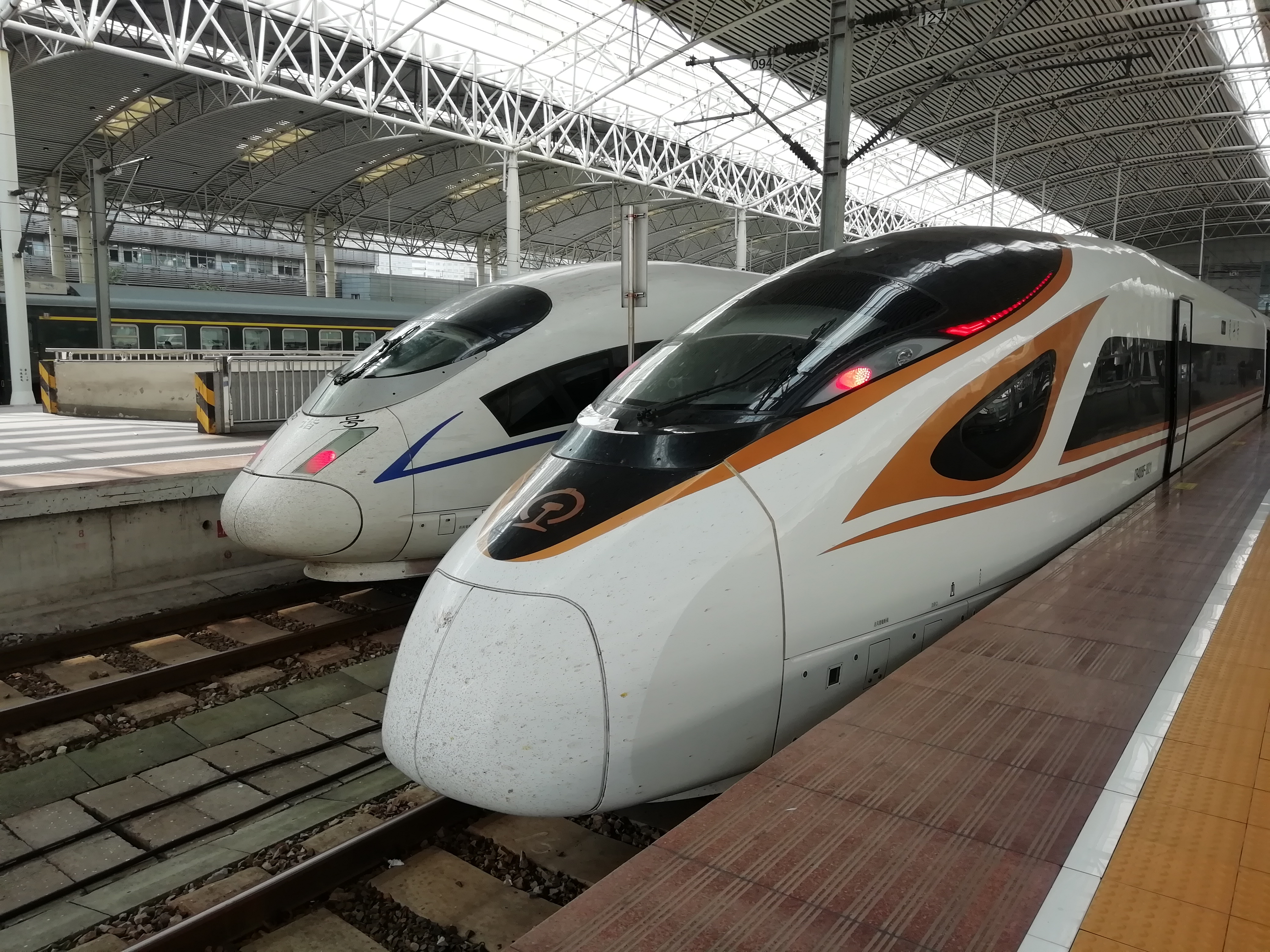
Two China Railway High-speed trainsets

Trains run by China Railway link almost every town and city in the People's Republic of China, including Beijing, Guangzhou, Shanghai, Shenzhen, and Xi'an, and onwards from Shenzhen across the border to Kowloon, in Hong Kong. New high-speed lines from 200–350 km/h (124–217 mph) operation are constructed, and many conventional lines are also upgraded to 200 km/h (124 mph) operation. Currently, there are seven High-Speed Inter-City lines in China, with up to 21 planned. They are operated independently of the often-parallel High-Speed Rail Lines.

==== Japan ====
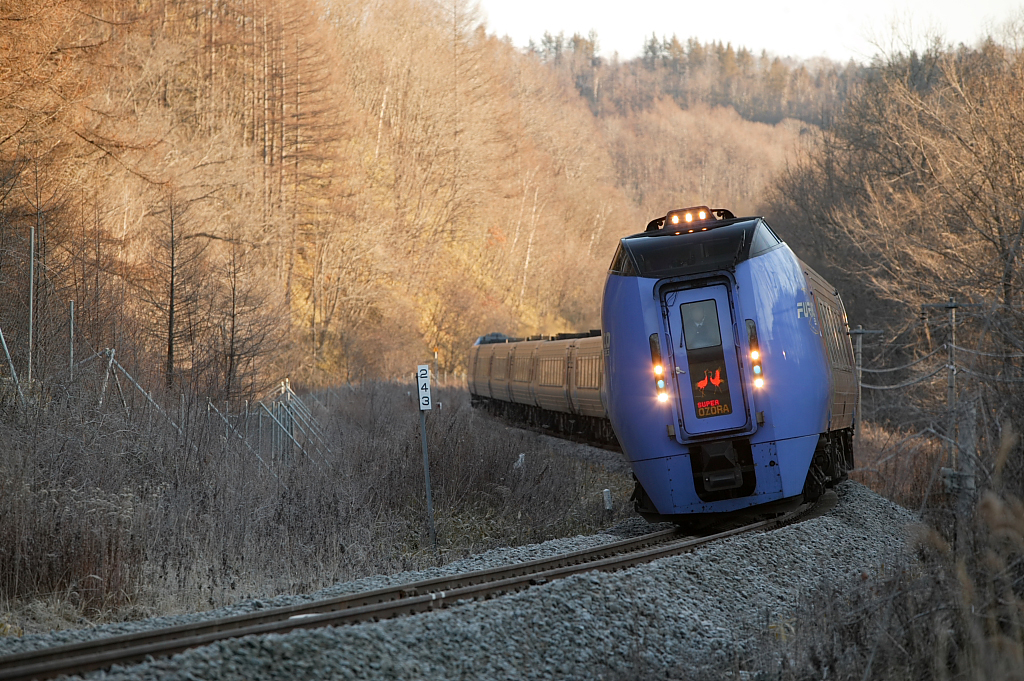
A DMU tilting train express Super Ōzora in Japan

Japan has six main regional passenger railway companies, collectively known as the Japan Railways Group (JR). Five JR companies operate the "bullet trains" on very fast and frequent Shinkansen lines that link all the larger cities, including Tokyo, Yokohama, Nagoya, Kyoto, Osaka, Hiroshima, Fukuoka and many more.

Many other cities are covered by a network of JR's limited express inter-city trains on 1,067 mm (3 ft 6 in) narrow-gauge lines. Major cities are covered by convenient train services every hour or more frequently. In addition to the JR Group, Japan has major private rail operators such as the Kintetsu, Meitetsu, Tobu Railway, and Odakyu Electric Railway that operate "limited express" inter-city services.

==== Hong Kong ====
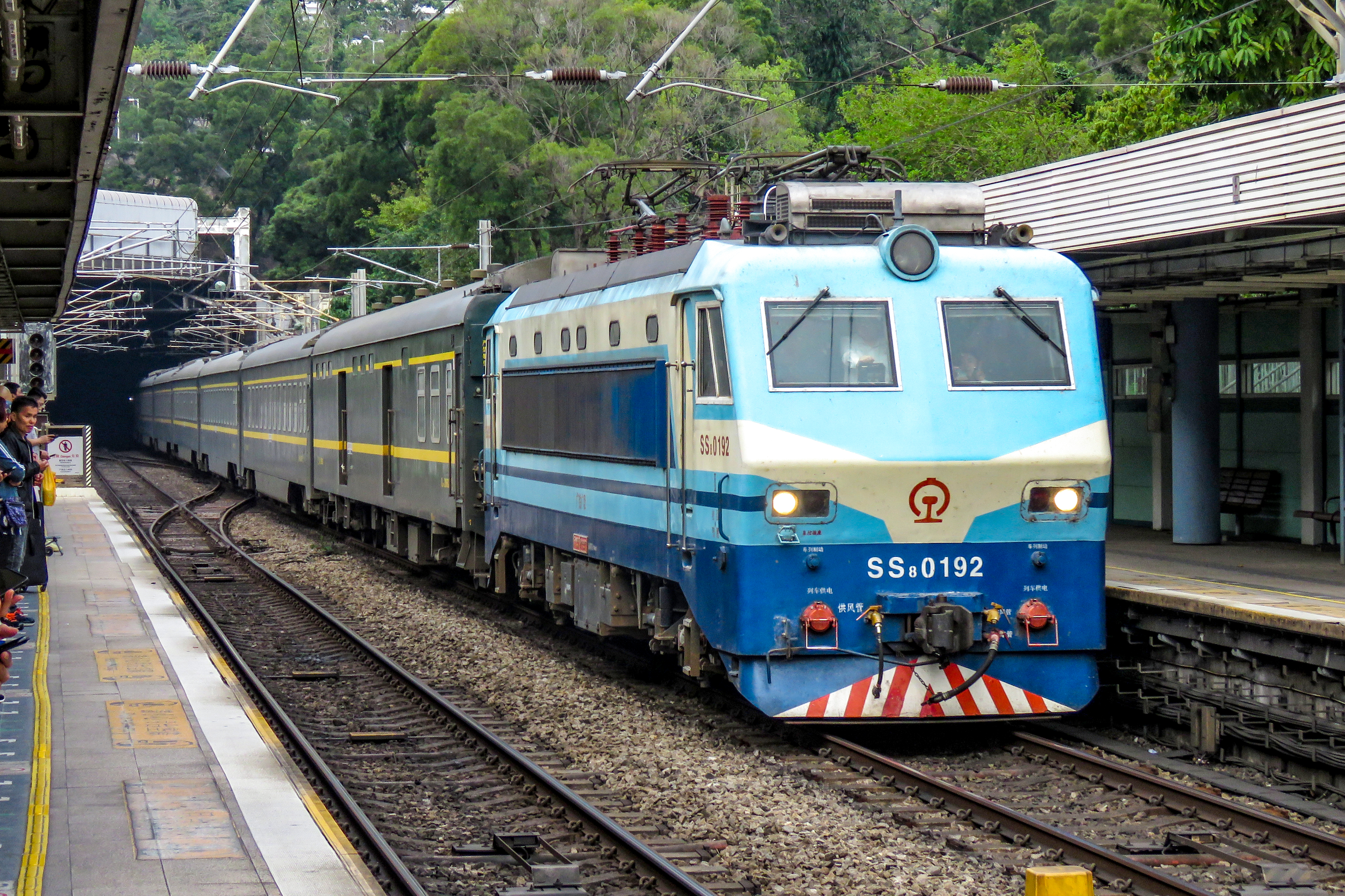
Beijing–Kowloon through train, hauled by a SS8 electric locomotive, passing through Kowloon Tong station in Hong Kong

Inter-city railway services crossing the Hong Kong-China border (often known as through trains) were jointly operated by Hong Kong's MTR Corporation Limited and the Ministry of Railways of the People's Republic of China. Hung Hom station was the only station in the territory where passengers could catch these cross-border trains. Passengers are required to go through immigration and customs inspections of Hong Kong before boarding a cross-border train or alighting from such a train. There were three cross-border train services on the conventional line:

- Between Hong Kong and Beijing (Beijing–Kowloon through train)
- Between Hong Kong and Shanghai (Shanghai–Kowloon through train)
- Between Hong Kong and Guangzhou (Guangzhou–Kowloon through train)

A new border-crossing service, the Guangzhou–Shenzhen–Hong Kong Express Rail Link, has been approved and has been granted HKD 6.6 billion in funding by the Legislative Council's Finance Committee. The line opened in 2018 with a new station, West Kowloon Terminus, in the city center. In response to the opening of the Guangzhou–Shenzhen–Hong Kong Express Rail Link, demand for the Through Train service dwindled, and such services have since been discontinued

==== Taiwan ====
Taiwan's coastline is connected by frequent inter-city train services by Taiwan Railway Administration. Taiwan High Speed Rail, opened in 2007, covers the most populated west-coast corridor. Chinese：對號列車

There are Chu-kuang express (莒光號) and Tze-chiang limited express (自強號).

==== South Korea ====
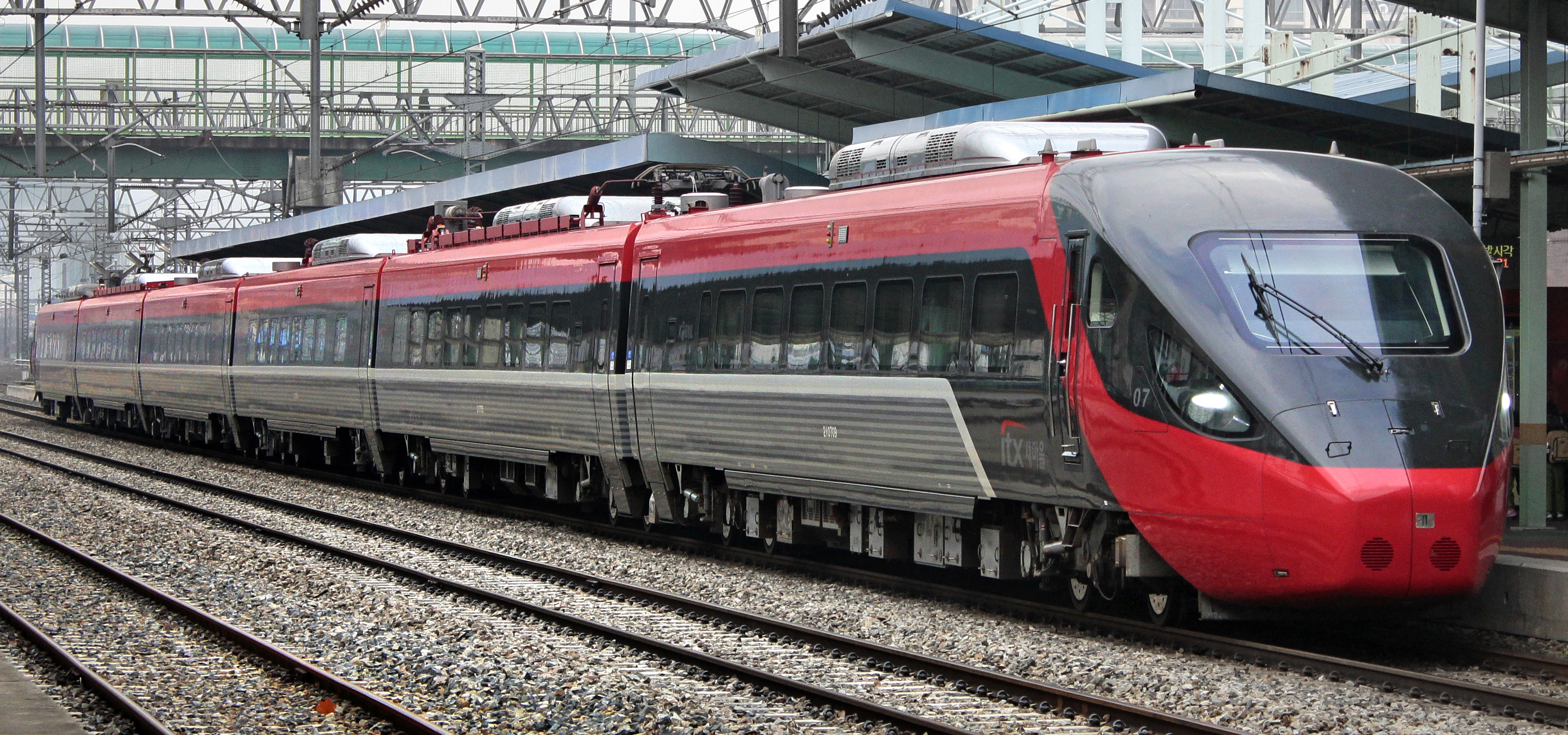
Korail's ITX-Saemaeul

Almost every major town and city in South Korea is linked by railway, run by Korail. ITX-Saemaeul operates on most Main railway lines, such as Japanese limited express services and German Intercity. Also, Mugunghwa-ho is the most common and popular type of intercity rail travel, similar to the German Regional-Express. In addition, Seoul and Busan are connected by a high-speed train line known as KTX, built using French TGV technology.

==== India ====
The Tejas Express at Chhatrapati Shivaji Terminus

India's inter-city trains are run by Indian Railways. With 68,043 km (42,280 mi) of rail routes and 7,308 stations, the railway network in India is the third-largest in the world (after Russia and China) and the largest in the world in terms of passenger kilometres. It connects almost every part of the country, linking major cities such as New Delhi, Mumbai, Bengaluru, Kolkata, Hyderabad, Chennai, Ahmedabad, Pune, Kochi, Jaipur, Chandigarh, Bhubaneswar, Surat, Vadodara, Agra and countless others. The Vande Bharat Express, Gatimaan Express, Tejas Express, Tejas-Rajdhani Express, Rajdhani Express, Shatabdi Express, Jan Shatabdi Express and Duronto Express are the fastest inter-city services in India; of these, the Vande Bharat is the fastest one. All long-distance journeys generally require a reservation, although unreserved travel is allowed in some trains.

==== Cambodia ====
There is only one train service in Cambodia, from Phnom Penh to Sihanoukville, stopping at Doun Kaev (Takeo) and Kampot.

==== Indonesia ====
In Indonesia, PT Kereta Api operates inter-city services between some of the country's major cities like Jakarta, Bandung, Semarang, Yogyakarta, Surakarta, Surabaya, Medan, Padang, and Palembang. In the Jakarta metropolitan area (or Jabodetabek), KRL Jabotabek operates inter-city and commuter services. Indonesia also currently operates Southeast Asia's first high-speed rail line between Jakarta and Bandung.

==== Laos ====
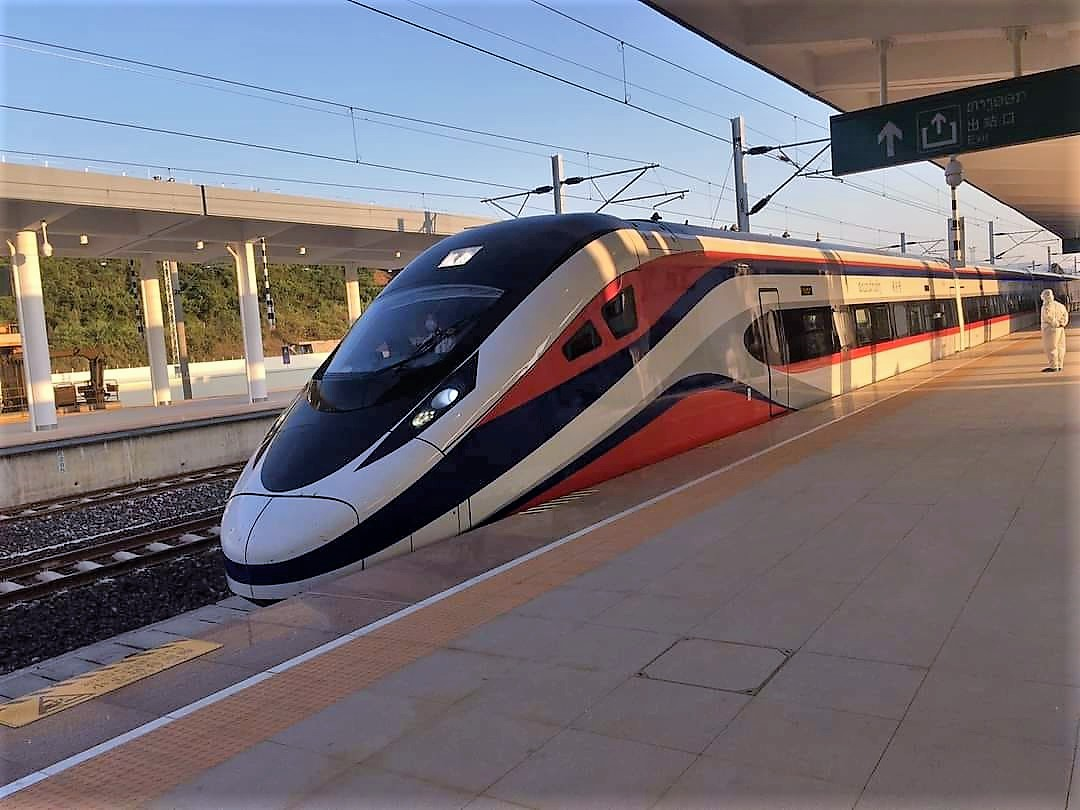
Laos–China Railway higher-speed EMU train

In recent years, construction has started on a China-funded higher-speed railway link, the Boten–Vientiane railway, commonly referred to as the China-Laos Railway. It is a fully electrified high-speed railway line, part of a long-term goal of connecting China with the rest of Southeast Asia. The line runs from Boten near the China-Laos border to Vientiane, the capital of Laos, using CRRC high/higher-speed EMU trains.

==== Malaysia ====
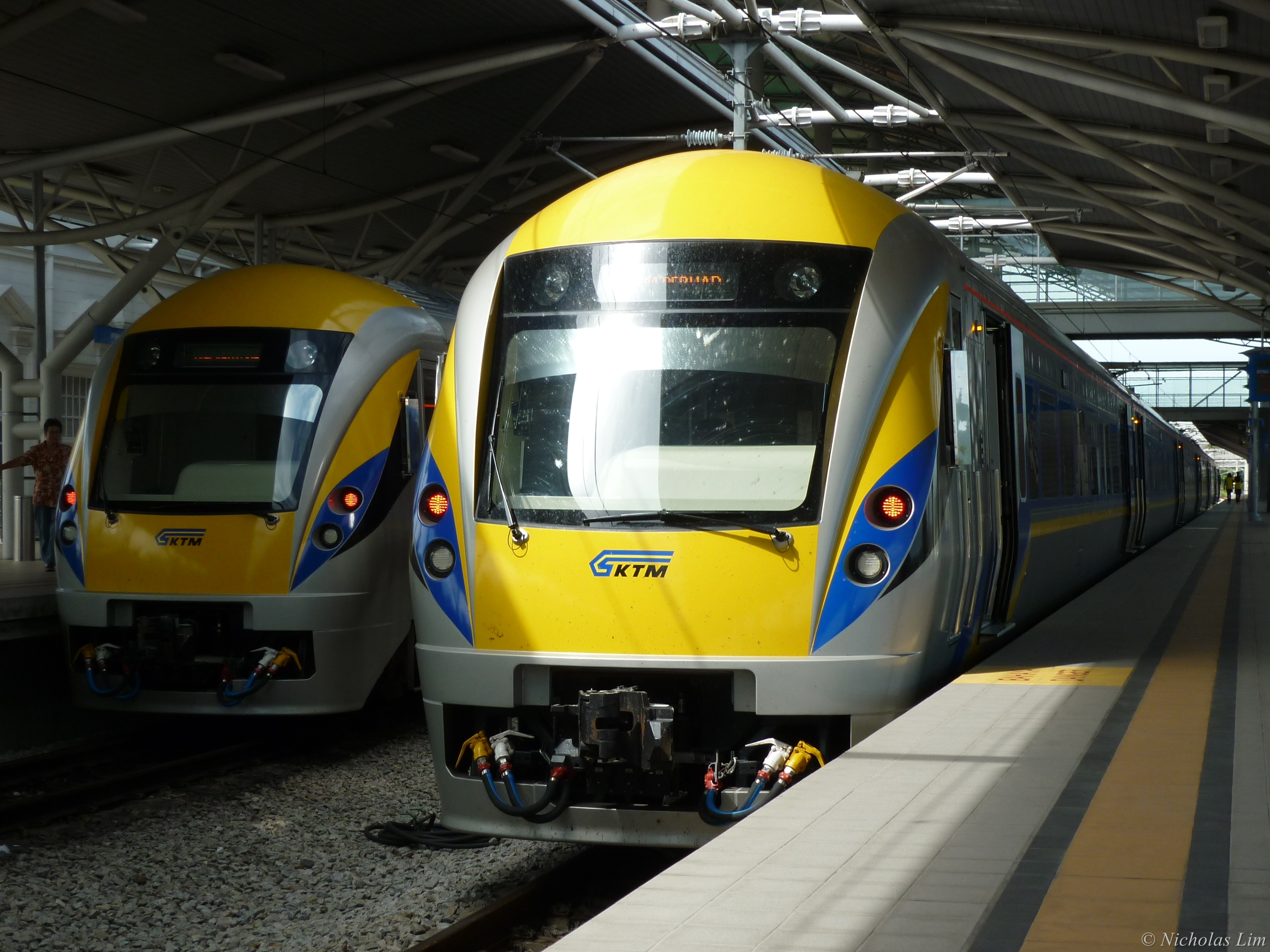
KTM ETS in Malaysia

Keretapi Tanah Melayu (Malayan Railways) operates loco-hauled express trains called KTM Intercity along Peninsular Malaysia and into Singapore. At the Malaysia–Thailand border, connections to State Railway of Thailand trains are available. KTM Intercity trains are diesel-powered and run on a single-track 1,000 mm (3 ft 3 3/8 in) metre gauge system. The rail track is gradually being duplicated and electrified. On the completed Central to Northern section (border), KTM runs the higher-speed Electric Train Service (ETS).

==== Philippines ====
As of February 2020, the Philippine National Railways does not have a regular intercity rail service, although the agency is planning to rebuild railway lines. Before the 1970s, the main island of Luzon had a relatively extensive narrow-gauge railway network. Still, government prioritization towards highway construction and the effects of multiple natural disasters gradually led to the decline and abandonment of most intercity rail services. Until the 2000s, PNR had two inter-city rail services: the Bicol Express and the Mayon Limited. The Bicol Express leaves Manila and passes through Manila, Pasay, and Muntinlupa and the provinces of Laguna, Quezon, and Camarines Sur before arriving at Naga. The trip takes 10 hours, or 600 minutes. The Mayon Limited connects Minola and Ligao in 10 1/2 hours. The Philippine government is planning the revival of inter-city rail with projects such as the PNR South Long Haul, which aims to reconstruct the railway in Southern Luzon.

==== Thailand ====
Thailand has a sizable meter-gauge intercity rail network radiating outwards from Bangkok, transporting around 60 million passengers every year. Construction is underway to connect Bangkok with Nakhon Ratchasima using a dedicated high-speed rail line.

==== Vietnam ====
Trains in Vietnam, run by Vietnam Railways, link Hanoi, Hué, Da Nang, Nha Trang, and Ho Chi Minh City.

==== Israel ====
Israel Railways operates inter-city services between all four major metropolitan areas of Israel: Tel Aviv, Jerusalem, Be'er Sheva, and Haifa. However, due to Israel's small geography, most railway services follow a more suburban pattern, with many short stops between the major city centers.

=== Europe ===
==== Western and Central Europe ====
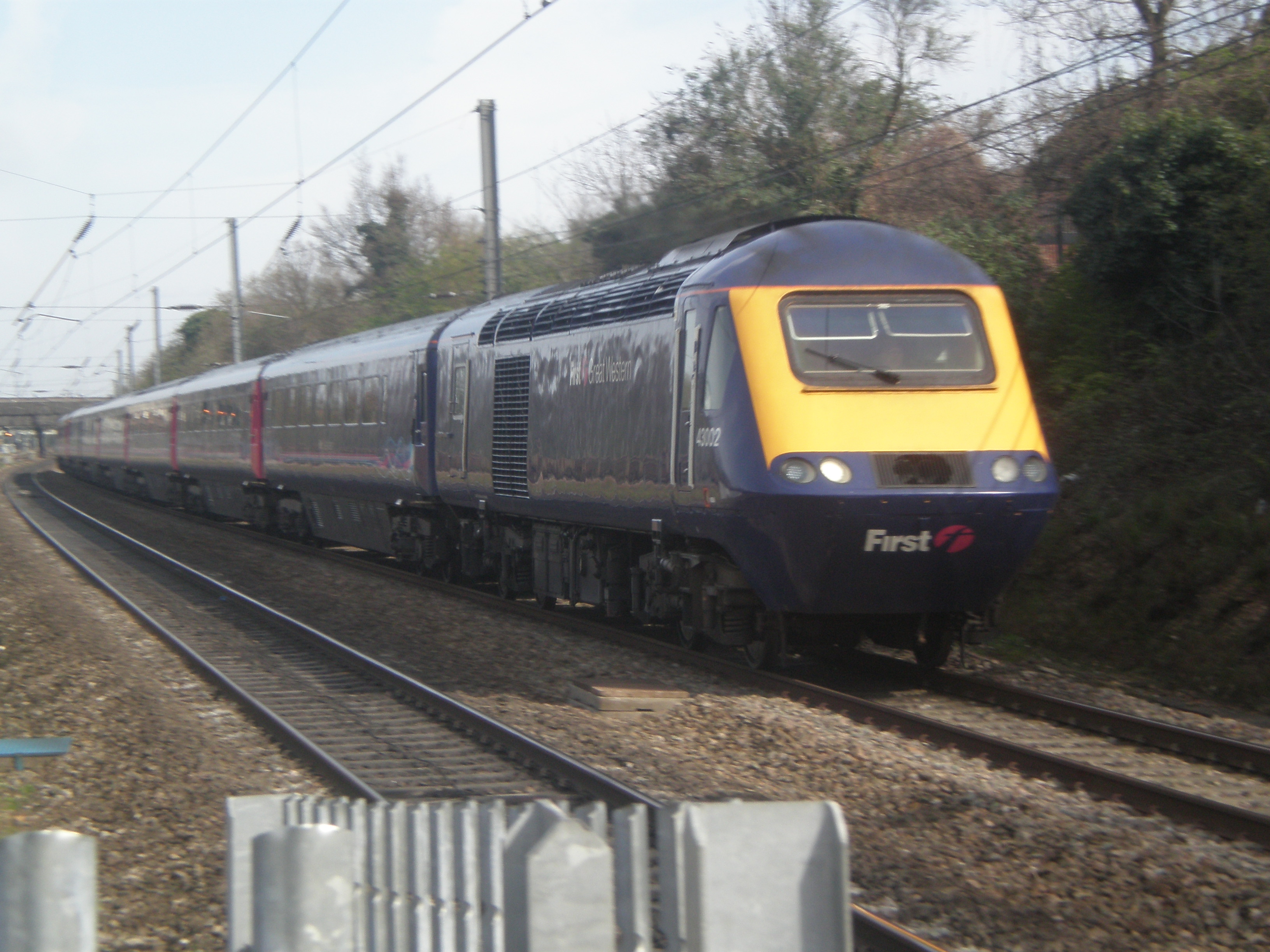
An InterCity 125 passes Ealing Broadway station in London. This is the world's fastest diesel train and was used on various intercity services in Great Britain until 2021.

In Europe, many long-distance inter-city trains are operated under the InterCity (often simply IC) brand. InterCity (or, initially, "Inter-City" with a hyphen) was first conceived as a brand name by British Rail for the launch of its electrification of the major part of the West Coast Main Line in 1966, which brought new express services between London and the major cities of Manchester, Birmingham and Liverpool. It later became the name of one of British Rail's new business sectors in the 1980s and was used to describe the whole network of mainline passenger routes in Great Britain. Still, it was taken out of official use following privatisation. The introduction of the British Rail Class 43 (HST) helped InterCity become a familiar brand in the 1970s.

The principal network of international express trains in continental Europe is called EuroCity, even though some InterCity trains also cross borders.

High-speed railways have relatively few stops. The German high-speed train service was named InterCityExpress, indicating its evolution from older InterCity trains. Other high-speed lines include the TGV (France), AVE (Spain), Treno Alta Velocità (Italy), Eurostar (United Kingdom–France and Belgium), Thalys (Netherlands–Belgium–Germany and France), Lyria (France-Switzerland), and Railjet (Germany-Austria–Czechia/Hungary).

===== Great Britain =====
In Great Britain, the inter-city rail links are now operated by many private companies such as Avanti West Coast, LNER, EMR, CrossCountry, TransPennine Express, Greater Anglia, ScotRail and GWR.

===== Ireland =====
Ireland's inter-city rail network is maintained by Iarnród Éireann. A joint operation with Northern Ireland Railways runs the cross-border "Enterprise" inter-city service.

===== Italy =====
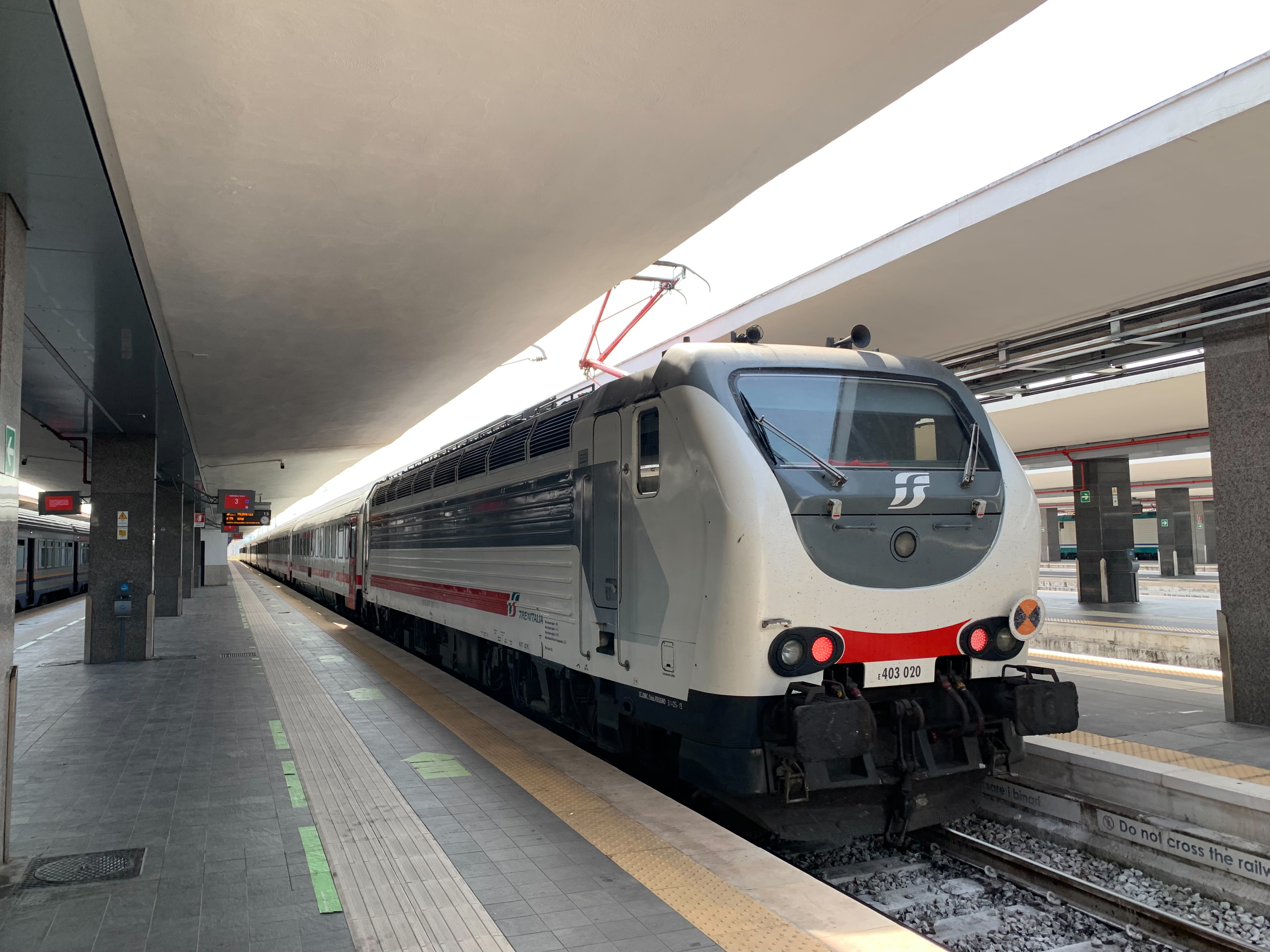
An Italian InterCity train at Napoli Centrale railway station

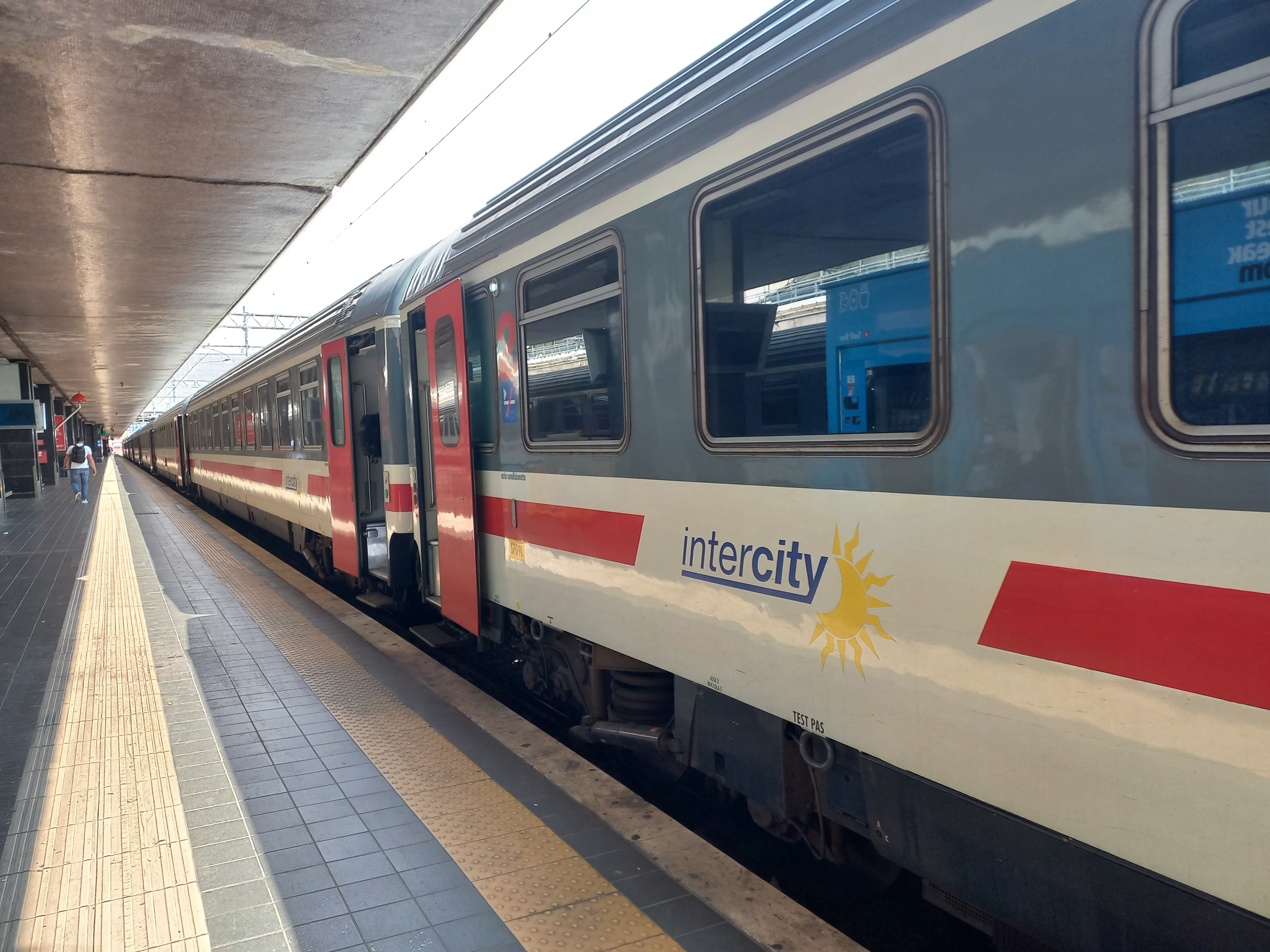
An Italian InterCity train at Roma Termini railway station

With the introduction of high-speed trains, intercity trains are limited to a few services per day on mainline and regional tracks.

The daytime services (InterCity IC), while infrequent and limited to one or two trains per route, are essential for providing access to cities and towns off the railway's mainline network. The main routes are Trieste to Rome (stopping at Venice, Bologna, Prato, Florence and Arezzo), Milan to Rome (stopping at Genoa, La Spezia, Pisa and Livorno / stopping at Parma, Modena, Bologna, Prato, Florence and Arezzo), Bologna to Lecce (stopping at Rimini, Ancona, Pescara, Bari and Brindisi) and Rome to Reggio di Calabria (stopping at Latina and Naples). In addition, the Intercity trains provide a more economical means of long-distance rail travel within Italy.

The night trains (Intercity Notte ICN) have sleeper compartments and washrooms, but no showers on board. Main routes are Rome to Bolzano/Bozen (calling at Florence, Bologna, Verona, Rovereto and Trento), Milan to Lecce (calling at Piacenza, Parma, Reggio Emilia, Modena, Bologna, Faenza, Forlì, Cesena, Rimini, Ancona, Pescara, Bari and Brindisi), Turin to Lecce (calling at Alessandria, Voghera, Piacenza, Parma, Bologna, Rimini, Pescara, Termoli, San Severo, Foggia, Barletta, Bisceglie, Molfetta, Bari, Monopoli, Fasano, Ostuni and Brindisi) and Reggio di Calabria to Turin (calling at Naples, Rome, Livorno, La Spezia and Genova). Most of these ICN services run at night; since most services take 10 to 15 hours to complete a one-way journey, their daytime portion provides additional train connections to complement the Intercity services.

==== Central and Eastern Europe ====
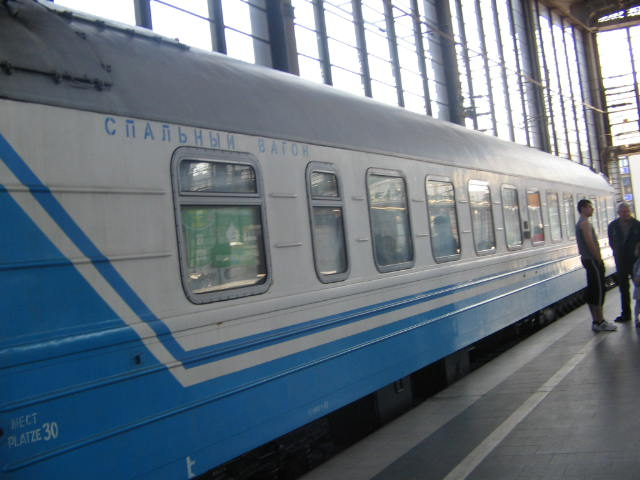
A Sibirjak passenger train travelling from Berlin to Novosibirsk, Russia

===== Poland =====
The Polish State Railways (PKP), a state-owned corporate group, is the main provider of railway services. The PKP group holds an almost unrivaled monopoly over rail services in Poland since it is both supported and partly funded by the national government.

As of 2018, foreign services operate on the Polish Railways network. These include EuroCity and EuroNight trains operating between Western and Eastern European destinations, including by the EN 440/441 from Berlin via Warsaw to Moscow operated by a Talgo train of the Russian Railways company.

In 2019, new nightjet train from Vienna to Berlin via Ostrava (CZ) and Wrocław (PL) starts the service."source 1". 8 May 2018..

===== Russia =====
Russia has a dense network of long-distance railways all over its vast territory, the longest and most famous being the Trans-Siberian Railway from Moscow to Vladivostok. Long-distance train routes of more than 1,000 or 2,000 km (621 or 1,243 mi) are common, with many trips taking two or three days. Speed is relatively low: trains average 60 or 70 km/h (37 or 43 mph).

=== North America ===
==== Canada ====
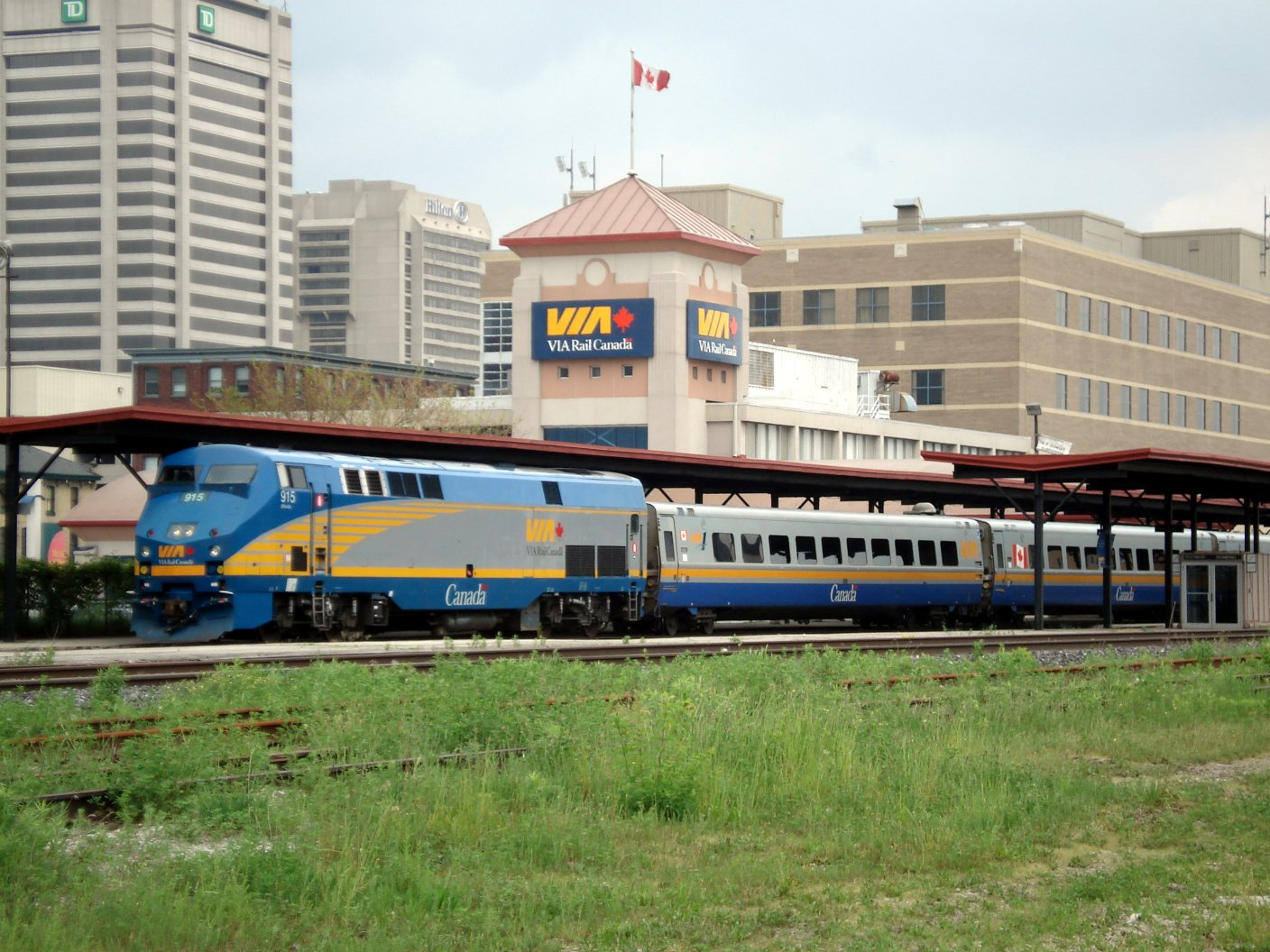
A Via Rail train at London station in London, Ontario

Canada's inter-city trains are mostly run by Via Rail, a Canadian crown corporation mandated to operate inter-city passenger rail service in Canada. The majority of its services connect major cities in the most populous part of the country, known as the Quebec City–Windsor Corridor, straddling the provinces of Ontario and Quebec. It also operates long-distance trains to western Canada and the Maritimes on the Canadian and Ocean lines and by smaller trains to more remote areas of Canada. Much like the United States, Canada previously had a larger intercity rail network before the 1970s; certain major cities such as Calgary and Regina lack connections to the extant Via Rail network, and passenger rail usage outside of the Quebec City–Windsor Corridor is infrequent and geared towards the tourism market.

International trains, run jointly by Amtrak and Via Rail, connect New York City with Toronto. Amtrak also operates the Adirondack between New York City and Montreal, and the Amtrak Cascades service linking Vancouver and Seattle. In addition, the White Pass and Yukon Route links Skagway and Whitehorse on an isolated northern route.

Other inter-city passenger rail operators include the Ontario Northland Railway, which operates passenger services between Cochrane and Moosonee in rural northern Ontario and luxury train operators such as the Royal Canadian Pacific and Rocky Mountaineer, which operate rail tours in Western Canada.

==== Mexico ====
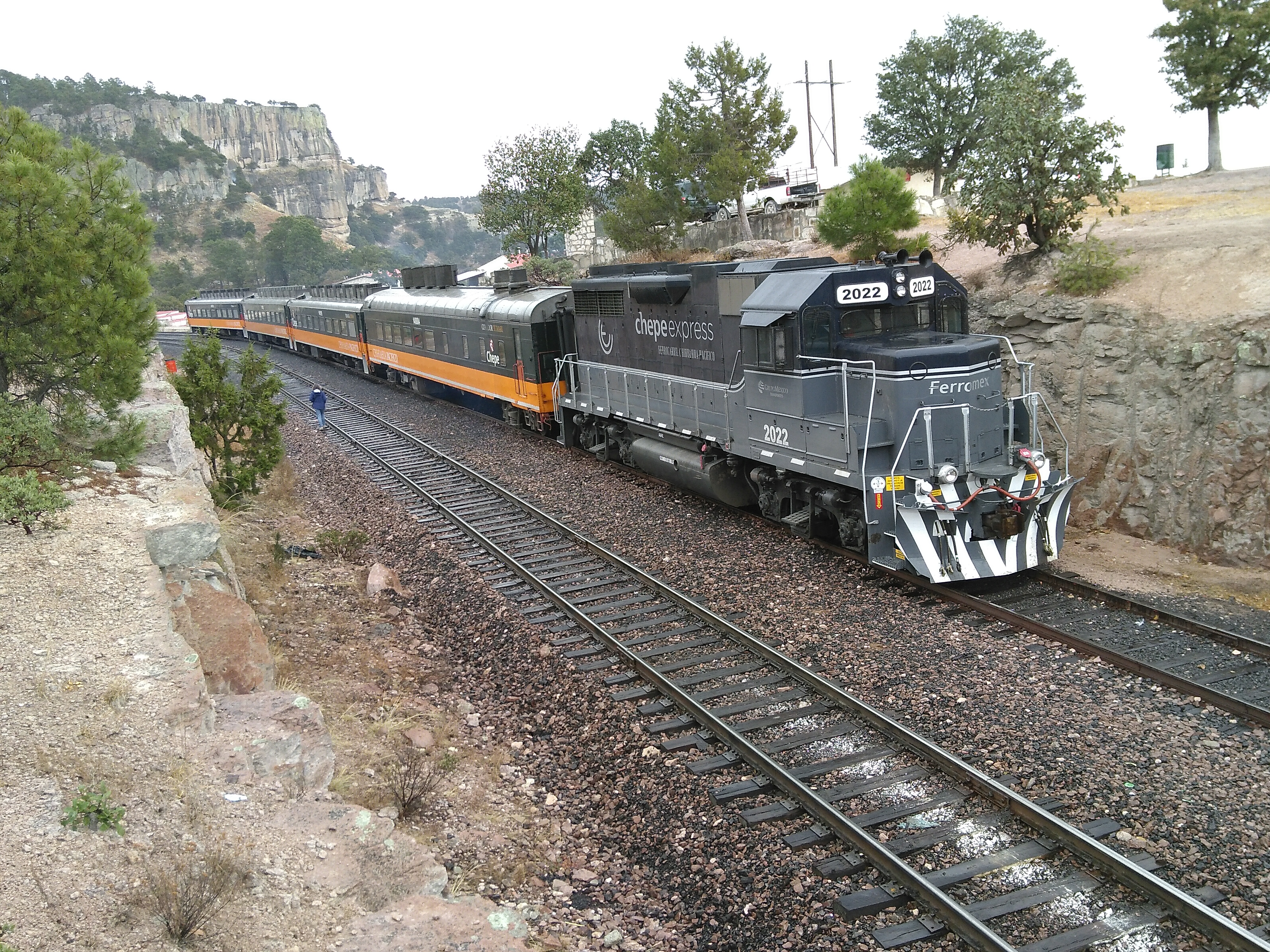
Ferrocarril Chihuahua al Pacífico (Chihuahua-Pacific Railway) in Mexico

In Mexico, the federal government discontinued almost all scheduled inter-city passenger trains in June 2001. Ferromex operates trains on three routes: Chihuahua City to Los Mochis, Torreón to Felipe Pescador, and Guadalajara to Amatitán. Mexican President Enrique Peña Nieto has proposed intercity trains, including from Mexico City to Toluca (construction began 7 July 2014), the Peninsular train from Yucatán to Riviera Maya, and the Mexico-Querétaro high-speed train from Puebla to Tlaxcala and Mexico City with future expansion to Guadalajara. In recent years, passenger trains have seen a revival, with the construction of the tourist-oriented Tren Maya route traversing the Yucatán Peninsula.

==== United States ====
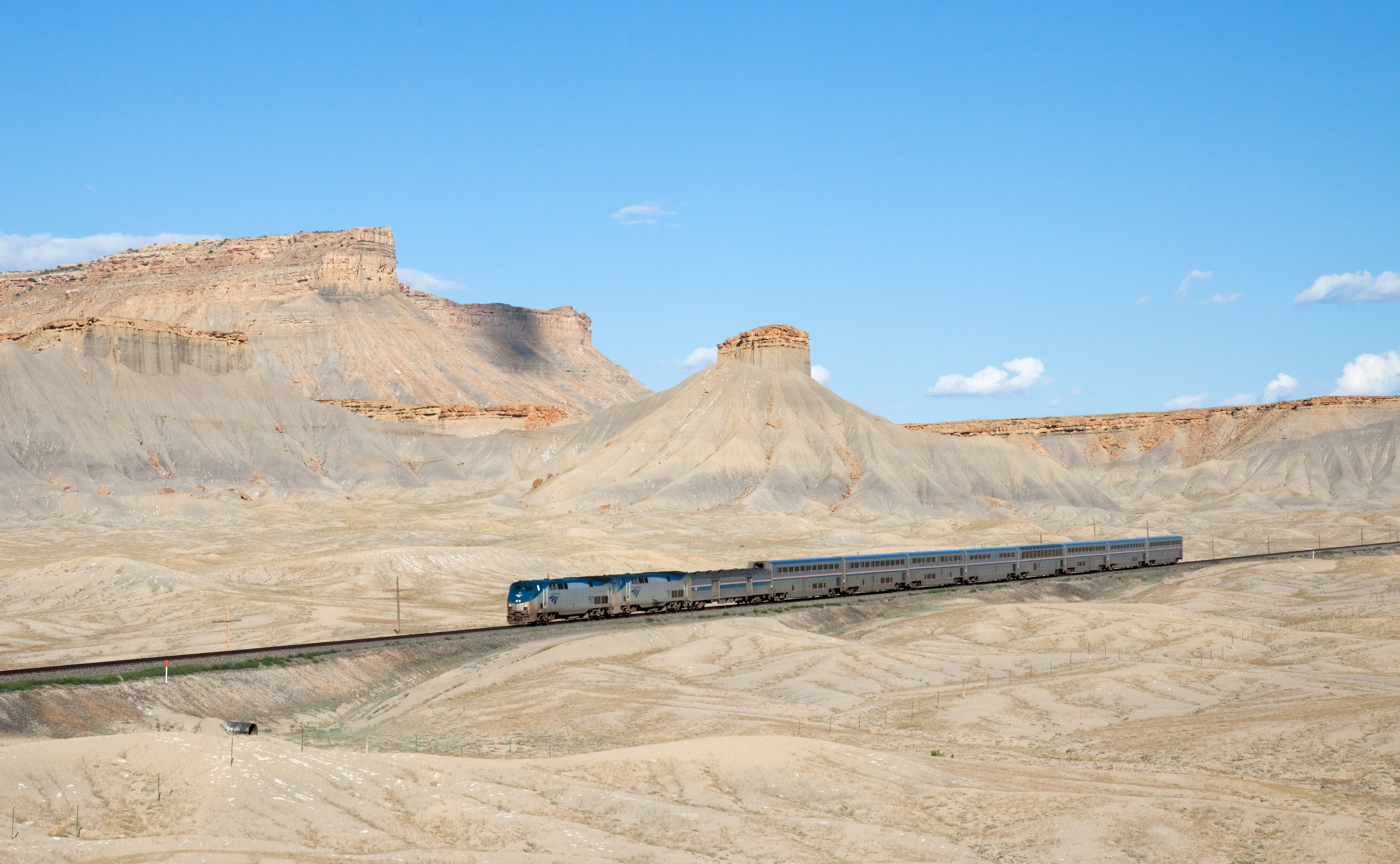
The westbound California Zephyr in Book Cliffs in Utah

There was a dense system of inter-city railways in the United States in the late 19th and early 20th centuries. After the decline of passenger railroads in North America in the 1960s, intercity lines declined sharply, and today the national system is far less dense. The most heavily used routes with the greatest ridership and schedule frequencies are in the Northeastern United States on Amtrak's Northeast Corridor. About one in every three users of mass transit in the United States and two-thirds of the nation's rail riders live in New York City. The two busiest passenger rail stations in the United States are Penn Station and Grand Central Terminal, both in Manhattan, New York City. Passenger rail outside the Northeast, Northwest, California, and the Chicago metropolitan area is infrequent and rarely used relative to networks in Europe and Japan.

Passenger lines in most of the United States are operated by the quasi-public corporation Amtrak. The separate Alaska Railroad, which is also government-owned, runs passenger trains in Alaska, and the privately owned Brightline rail service operates in Florida. The California High-Speed Rail system began construction in 2015 and aims to connect major job centers in California.

Multiple new rail corridors have been identified for private development throughout the country. These include the Brightline West corridor from Las Vegas to Los Angeles, California, the Texas Central Railway between Dallas and Houston in Texas, and others.

=== Oceania ===
==== Australia ====
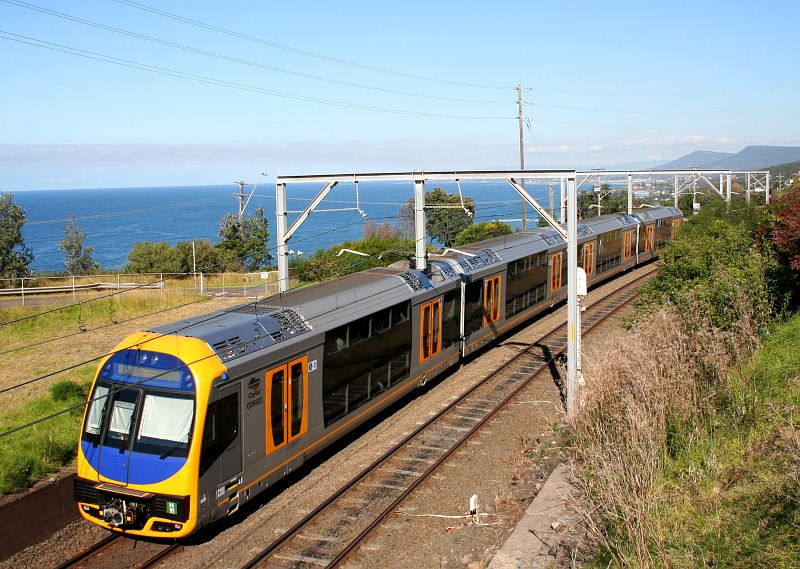
An H set on the South Coast Line

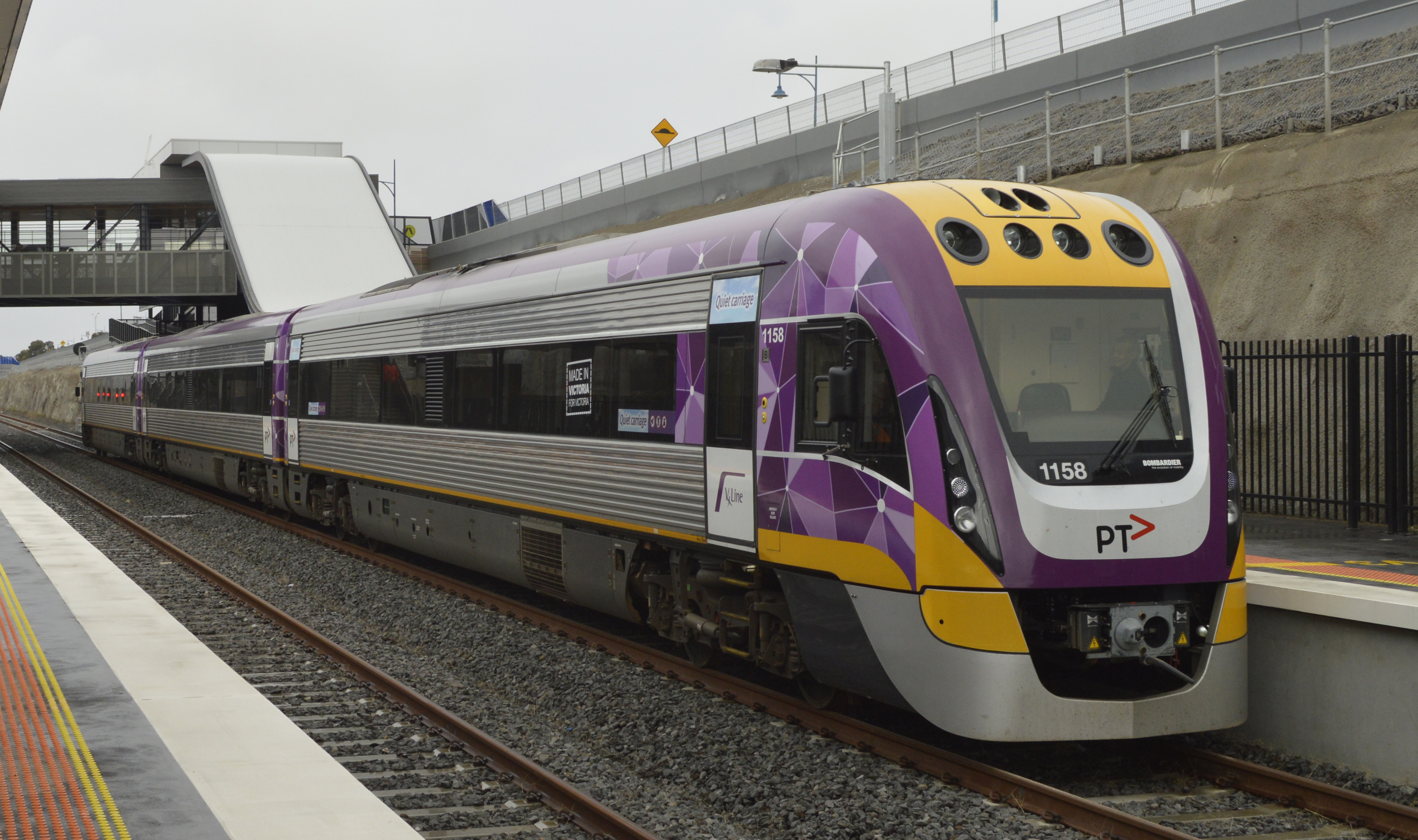
A V/Line VLocity train running in Victoria

In Australia, the national interstate network operated by Journey Beyond connects all mainland Australian capital cities except Canberra. However, it is catered towards the luxury tourism market. NSW TrainLink operates interstate services from Sydney to Canberra, Melbourne, and Brisbane. Intrastate inter-city trains that traverse shorter distances are operated by V/Line, NSW TrainLink, Sydney Trains, Queensland Rail and Transwa. The fastest intercity trains in regular service have a top service speed of 160 km/h.

In Australia, electrified interurban commuter railway systems are used to connect urban areas separated by long distances and use heavy-rail equipment:

- In New South Wales, Sydney Trains operates an extensive interurban network of four main routes from Sydney. These run to Newcastle and the Central Coast, the Blue Mountains, the Southern Highlands and the South Coast. Sydney Trains brands its interurban commuter services as "Intercity".
- In Brisbane, QR's City network operates a smaller interurban commuter network of three lines which connect Brisbane to the Gold Coast in the south, Caboolture and the Sunshine Coast in the north and Rosewood in the west.
- In Perth, an electric interurban rail line running down the middle of the Kwinana Freeway to serve Mandurah opened on 23 December 2007.

On these systems, services either run as limited-stop express trains in the suburban area or as shuttles terminating at the ends of the suburban lines.

A large-scale non-electric project comprising four regional lines, known as the Regional Fast Rail, is operational in Victoria. Current interurban and intercity journeys outside the suburban area are often locomotive-hauled, particularly for longer-distance services, due to Victoria's lack of electrification outside of Melbourne.

==== New Zealand ====
In New Zealand, there are currently three long-distance passenger services classed as inter-city: the Coastal Pacific, the Northern Explorer, and the TranzAlpine. The rugged country limits their average speed, particularly in the middle of the North Island, where the North Island Main Trunk has many sharp curves and steep gradients. Given these speeds and the prioritization of rail transport in New Zealand for freight, these passenger services primarily cater to the tourist market, similar to long-distance routes in Australia.

Other current commuter passenger services include the Capital Connection, Te Huia, and the Wairarapa Connection. A network of regional and long-distance rail passenger services, which existed until the mid-twentieth century, has largely been replaced by air or bus services.

=== South America ===
International train services once connected a few countries in South America, but today they are almost nonexistent, with the notable exceptions of Argentina and Chile. Most governments on the continent have favored roads and automobile transportation since the mid-20th century.

==== Argentina ====
Argentina has intercity services on several routes, operated by Operadora Ferroviaria Sociedad del Estado. Trains in Argentina are experiencing a revival, since the government intends to re-establish long-distance passenger trains between major cities.

==== Bolivia ====
Inter-city train services in Bolivia are operated by two train companies: Eastern and Western. The western network runs daily trains from Oruro to Tupiza, with both espresso (fast) and WaraWara (slow) trains. The eastern rail hub is Santa Cruz de la Sierra, with connections to Puerto Suárez and Villamontes, and international lines to Brazil and Argentina.

==== Brazil ====
Brazil's inter-city services operate on two routes, one from Vitória to Belo Horizonte (Vitória-Minas Railway) and another from Parauapebas to São Luís. A third service was proposed by São Paulo state government to operate from São Paulo to Americana.

==== Chile ====
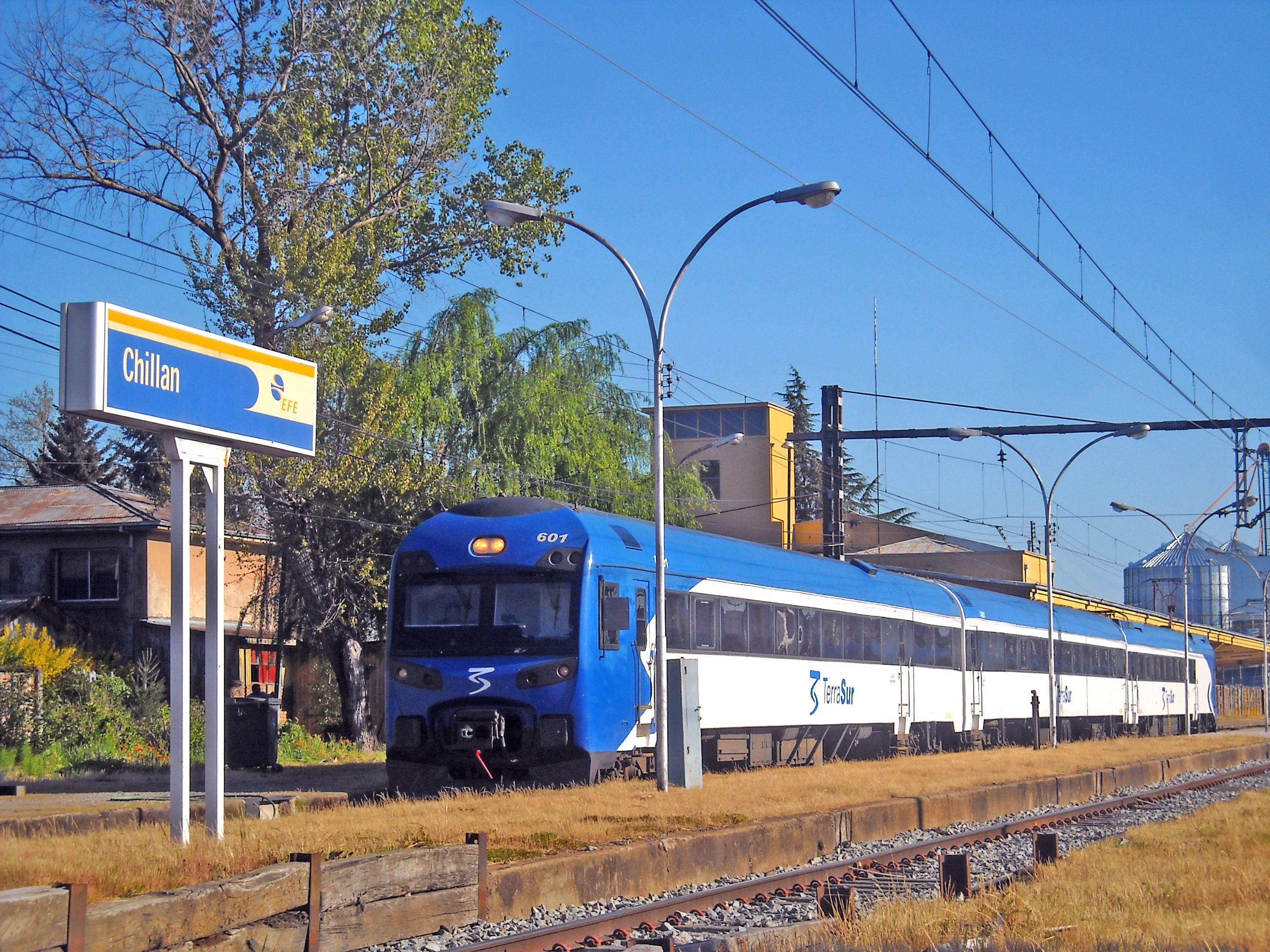
The TerraSur on Estación Chillán, Chile's fastest inter-city rail service, reaching 150 kmh on the fastest section of its route

Chile has inter-city services connecting Santiago to Chillán and occasionally to Temuco, run by Empresa de los Ferrocarriles del Estado. The fastest in Chile (and South America) is TerraSur, reaching around 150 km/h (93 mph).

== See also ==
- Express train
- Limited-stop
- Lists of named passenger trains
- Longest train journeys
- PKP Intercity
- Railway electrification systems
- Railway stations in the Netherlands#Categories (spelling: "intercity")
- Terminal station
