= Perus (CPTM) =

Railway station in São Paulo, Brazil

Coordinates: 23.4051°S 46.7536°W

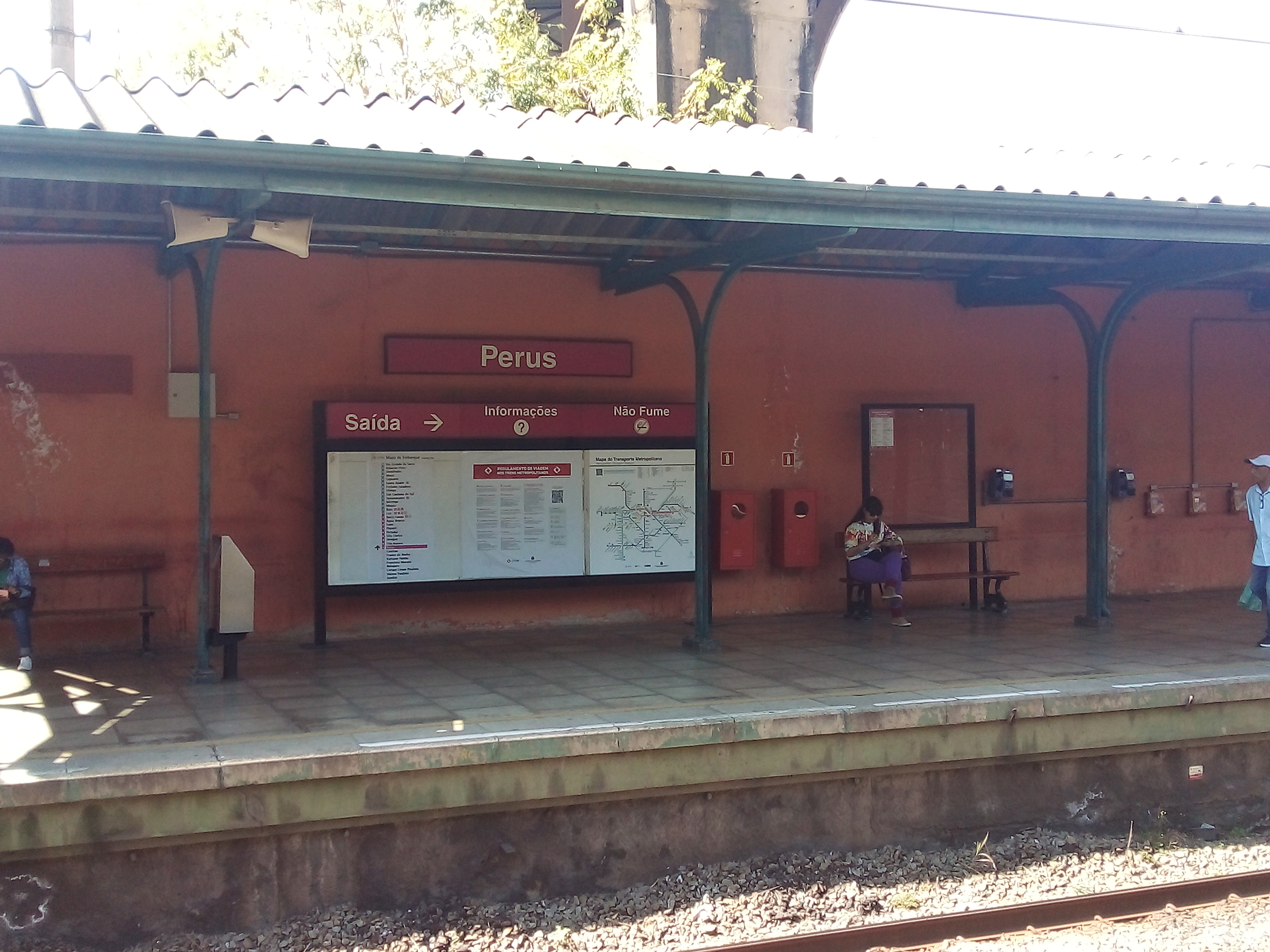

General information
- Location: Av. Dr. Sílvio de Campos, s/n Perus; Brazil
- Owner: Government of the State of São Paulo
- Operator: TIC Trens (Grupo Comporte)
- Platforms: Side platforms

Construction
- Structure type: At-grade

Other information
- Station code: PRU

History
- Opened: 16 February 1867
- Rebuilt: 3 March 2003
- Former names: Perús

Services
| Preceding station | São Paulo Metropolitan Trains | Following station |
|---|---|---|
| Caieiras towards Jundiaí | Line 7 | Vila Aurora towards Palmeiras-Barra Funda |
Track layout
Location

Perus is a train station on TIC Trens Line 7-Ruby, in the district of Perus in São Paulo, Brazil.

== History ==
Perus station was opened by São Paulo Railway on 16 February 1867 and, since 1994, is operated by CPTM. Along with Piqueri, Pirituba, Vila Clarice, Jaraguá and Vila Aurora stations, it's also located in North Side São Paulo.

=== Accidents ===
==== 1969 accident between Caieiras and Perus ====
In the morning of 21 March 1969, a train that departe from Francisco Morato station stopped between Caieiras and Perus because of an electrical failure in the train. The train drive and the chief of the composition request a diesel powered locomotive with a maintenance team to tow the train until the nearest station, where the repair should be done.

However, the repair was done right there, in the middle of the tracks, by the railway machine inspector, Jorge Pilot, who left a train who was heading toward Jundiaí. After the repair, the train began to work again normally, until 5 minutes later, when in crashed with the maintenance locomotive which was heading in the opposite way and was initially request for the repair. In the accident, 40 people died (according to Folha de S. Paulo and Revista Veja), among them the inspector Jorge Pilot, and another 400 were wounded.

==== 2000 accident in Perus ====
At 9:15pm BRT, a TUE Budd Mafersa-Series 1100, which left Jaraguá towards Francisco Morato, stopped at Perus because of power outage. Another Series 1700 composition, which was stopped a little bit after Jaraguá for the same reason in the same line of the other train, and which was emptied, couldn't be stopped in the sloped area between Jaraguá and Perus due to a brake breakdown, traveled for 5.5 kilometres (3.4 mi) in 8 minutes and collided with the parked train in Perus. The accident caused the death of 9 people and other 115 wounded and almost destroyed the entire station.
