= Vila Clarice (CPTM) =

Railway station in São Paulo, Brazil

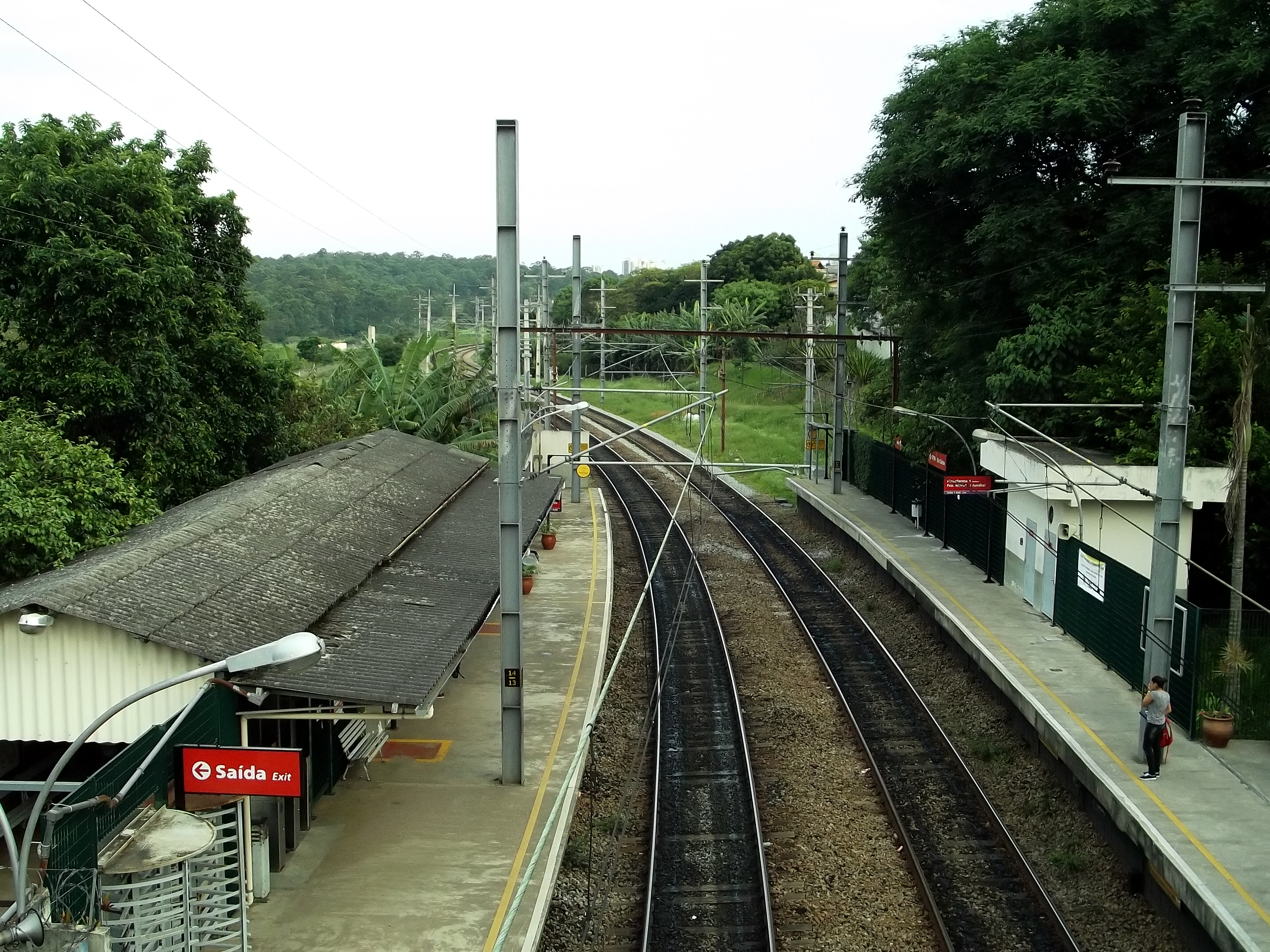
- Vila Clarice station seen from above.

General information
- Location: Praça Comendador Souza Cruz, s/n Pirituba; Brazil
- Coordinates: 23.469781°S 46.744385°W
- Owner: Government of the State of São Paulo
- Operator: TIC Trens (Grupo Comporte)
- Platforms: Side platforms

Construction
- Structure type: At-grade

Other information
- Station code: VCL

History
- Opened: 1 September 1955
- Former names: Vila Clarisse

Services
Preceding station	São Paulo Metropolitan Trains	Following station
Jaraguá towards Jundiaí	Line 7	Pirituba towards Palmeiras-Barra Funda
Track layout
Location

Vila Clarice is a train station on TIC Trens Line 7-Ruby, located in the district of Pirituba in São Paulo.

== History ==
The allotment of Vila Clarisse was already in São Paulo maps in 1930, as in 1943 the core was already under settlement. Between the 1940s and the beginning of the 1950s, a platform was built, with occasional train stops. In 1953, City Councillor Anna Lamberga Zeglio requested to the Director of Estrada de Ferro Santos-Jundiaí that the commuter trains made regular stop in the station. With the growing of Vila Clarrise neighbourhoo, EFSJ implemented a station to replace the platform, opened on 1 September 1955.

After being operated by RFFSA between 1957 and 1983, Vila Clarice is transferred to CBTU in 1984, which enlarged the station platforms from 6 to 9 cars in 1985.

On 1 June 1994, the station was transferred to CPTM. Besides it wasn't affected by the 1983 riots, Vila Clarice was severely depredated along with other 5 stations of the CPTM Northwest Line during the 1996 riots. Because of it, the station and the line were closed for 6 months for repairs.

Because Vila Clarice is in a curve, the gap between the train and platforms is of 39 centimetres (15 in), above the 10 centimetres (3.9 in) allowed by ABNT-NBR 14021, being the 4th largest of all the network. The gaps are center of many passengers complaints. Besides CPTM develops many projects to reduce the gaps, none of them were implanted.

=== Projects ===
==== CPTM ====
CPTM made two biddings for a project of platform structural recovery and station functional readjustment. Besides small works were executed, the main ones (construction of a new building and platform coverage) weren't.

==== Metro ====
During São Paulo campaign for Expo 2020, a new Exhibition Centre was projected to receive the exposition in the region of Pirituba/Vila Clarisse. To attend the visitors, Metro project the expansion of Line 6-Orange from Brasilândia to Bandeirantes, connection with CPTM Line 7 in Vila Clarice. With São Paulo's defeat, the project was cancelled.

However, in the 2019 Metro Report, the expansion of Line 6 appeared as one of the plans of the company.

== Toponymy ==
The station was named after the allotment launched in 1943 in the region. Besides the neighbourhood is named Vila Clarisse, the new station was named Vila Clarice, what was kept until nowadays.
