= Vila Aurora =

Railway station in São Paulo, Brazil

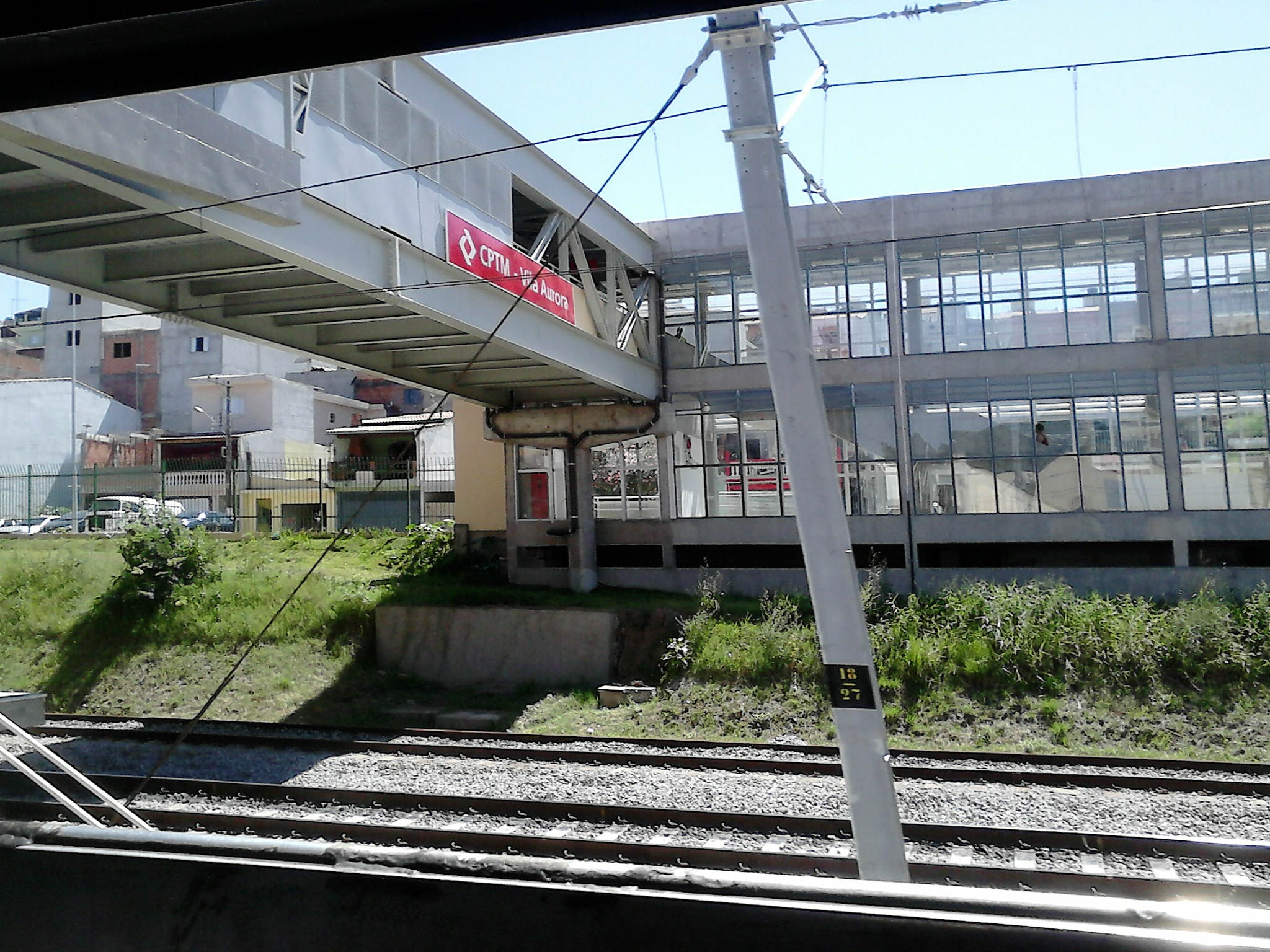

General information
- Location: R. Francisco da Cunha Menez, 1066; Jaraguá; Brazil
- Coordinates: 23.437729°S 46.747304°W
- Owner: Government of the State of São Paulo
- Operator: TIC Trens (Grupo Comporte)
- Platforms: Island platform

Construction
- Structure type: At-grade

Other information
- Station code: VAU

History
- Opened: 9 September 2013

Services
Preceding station	São Paulo Metropolitan Trains	Following station
Perus towards Jundiaí	Line 7	Jaraguá towards Palmeiras-Barra Funda
Track layout
Location

Vila Aurora is a train station on TIC Trens Line 7-Ruby, in the district of Jaraguá in São Paulo.

== History ==
Because of the 6 kilometres (3.7 mi) distance between Jaraguá and Perus stations, the Prefecture of São Paulo suggested to the State Government the construction of Vila Aurora station between them in the Director Plan of the Subprefecture of Pirituba.

After a brief start, the construction was put on hold in 2010 because of disagreements between CPTM and consortium companies, which quit the construction. The work was resumed in the end of 2010 by the Heleno & Fonseca Construtécnica S/A consortium, which place second in the bidding, by the cost of R$ 26,000,000 (US$ 15,542,535.31). After more delays, the station was opened on 9 September 2013, by the cost of R$ 40,300,000 (US$ 18,691,249.37), above the original budget.
