= Antônio Moreira Borges =

Brazilian priest (born 1945)

Father Antônio Maria
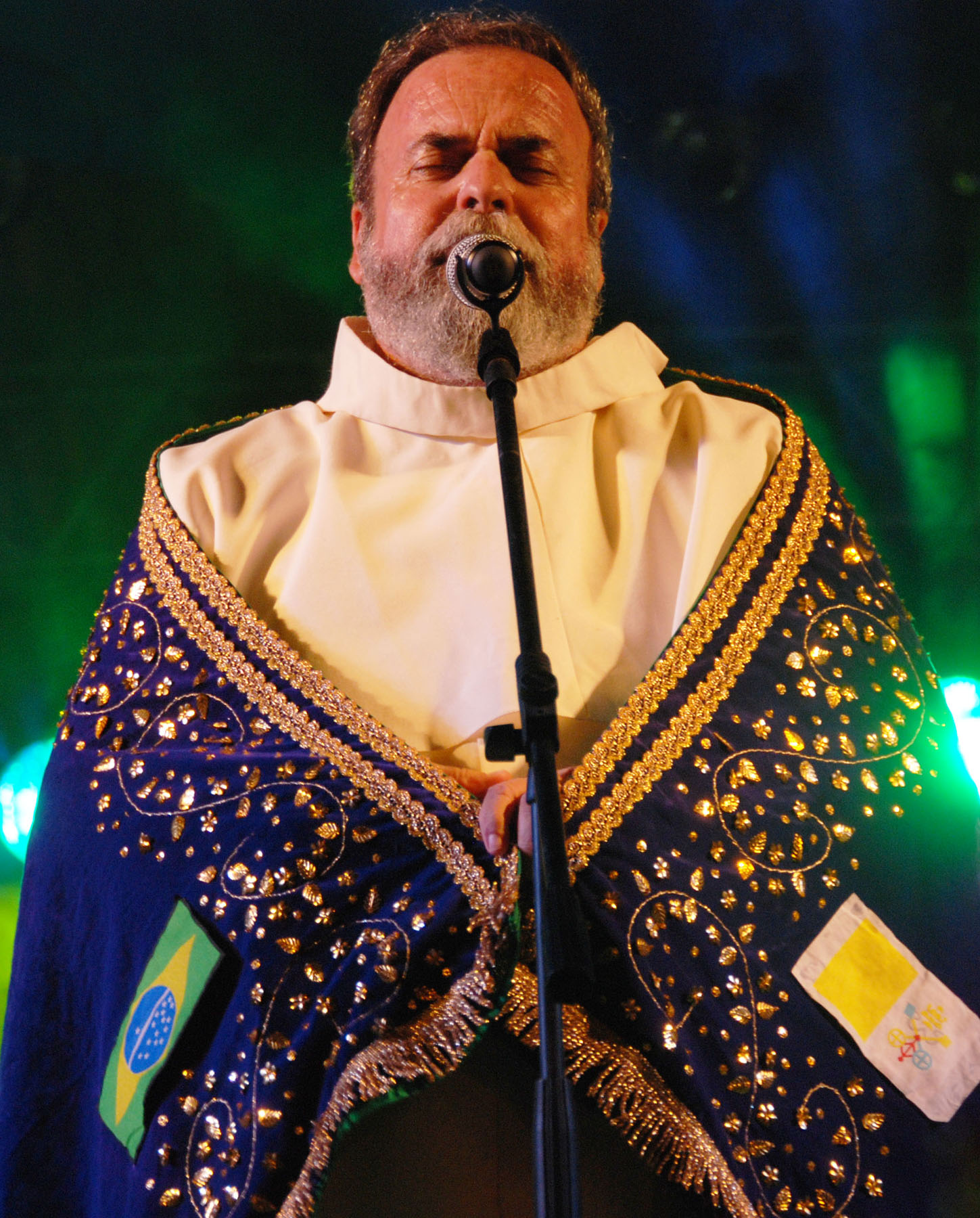

Personal life
- Born: Antônio Moreira Borges; 17 August 1945 (age 80) Rio de Janeiro, Rio de Janeiro, Brazil

Religious life
- Religion: Roman Catholicism
- Ordination: 25 September 1976

Military service
- Rank: Priest

Antonio Moreira Borges, better known as Father Antônio Maria (born 17 August 1945), is a Brazilian Catholic priest and singer. He has performed duets with Roberto Carlos, Agnaldo Rayol and Angela Maria, as well as a presentation for the then Pope John Paul II.

== Biography ==
=== First years ===
His parents, Francisco and Mavília, were Portuguese and arrived in Brazil in 1928. They settled in the neighborhood of Magalhães Bastos, Rio de Janeiro, and had five children, two of whom died before they reached 1 year of age. The other three were Carmelina, Eduardo and Antônio. Father Antônio Maria refers to himself as "half Brazilian, half Portuguese".

Antonio and his family lived a humble life; he lived with his grandmother Maria and grandfather Manuel until 1948, when they finished building a home. Antonio studied at Colégio Rosa da Fonseca.

=== Priesthood ===
He was ordained as a priest on 25 September 1976. In his early years as a priest, he carried out missionary activity in Portugal.

He spent many years in charge of the Works of Greater Love at Catarina Kentenich Educational Center, based in Jaraguá, São Paulo. He then spent a year in a sabbatical period in Mexico.

As a priest, who made a vow of poverty and therefore does not have institutions in his name, the Congregation took over the whole work of the orphanage, where Father Antonio Maria has three adopted children. He now lives in Extrema, Minas Gerais, or in Jacareí, in São Paulo, where the sisters of the new project work on the construction of a convent. "Of course humanly speaking, I miss it, but God is filling with other works that we are doing," he told the Mundo Lusíada.

Antônio Maria has since worked at the Filhas de Maria Foundation – Servas dos Pequeninos, with his mother-house in Minas Gerais, and branches in other states.

== Discography ==
Father Antônio Maria
- Genres: Religious music
- Occupation: singer
- Years active: 1976 – present
- Website: https://www.padreantoniomaria.com.br/

- 1982 – A Esperança Tem Voz
- 1984 – Tempo de Paz
- 1993 – 99
- 1994 – Foi Deus
- 1994 – Pássaro Liberto
- 1999 – Festa da Fé
- 2000 – Mensageiro do Amor
- 2001 – Apenas um Menino
- 2002 – Missão Divina
- 2003 – No Mar De Maria
- 2004 – Com Vida
- 2007 – Benedito Bento do Brasil
- 2010 – Prisioneiro do Amor
- 2015 – Mais Perto
- 2015 – Peregrina Do Evangelho
