= Pirituba (CPTM) =

Railway station in São Paulo, Brazil

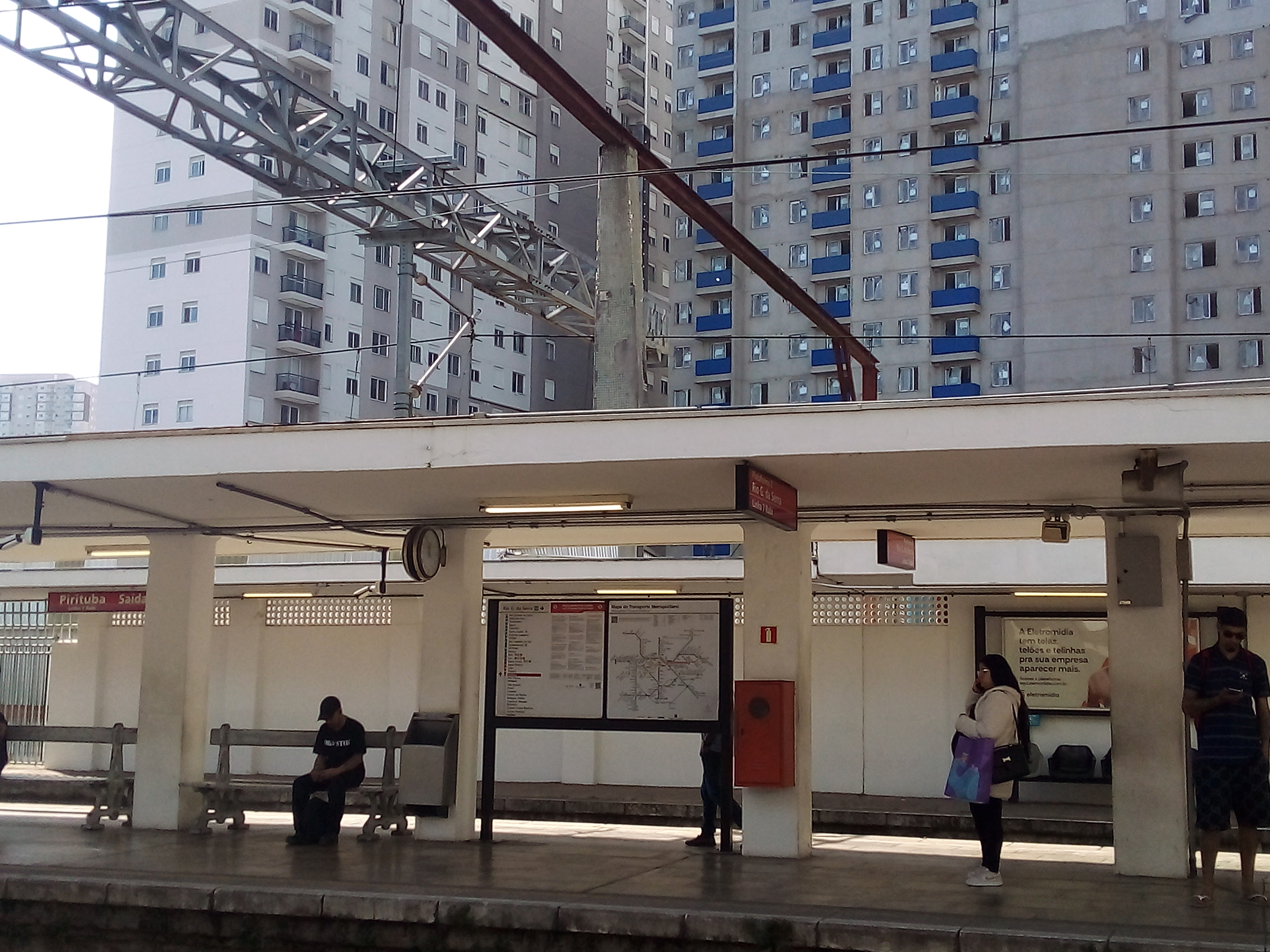
- Station platform

General information
- Location: R. Camarões, s/n Pirituba; Brazil
- Coordinates: 23.4885°S 46.726007°W
- Owner: Government of the State of São Paulo
- Operator: TIC Trens (Grupo Comporte)
- Platforms: Side platforms
- Connections: Pirituba Bus Terminal; Pirituba–Lapa–Centro Bus Corridor

Construction
- Structure type: At-grade

Other information
- Station code: PRT

History
- Opened: 1 February 1885

Services
| Preceding station | São Paulo Metropolitan Trains | Following station |
|---|---|---|
| Vila Clarice towards Jundiaí | Line 7 | Piqueri towards Palmeiras-Barra Funda |
Track layout
Location

Pirituba is a train station on TIC Trens Line 7-Ruby, located in the district of Pirituba in São Paulo.

== History ==
The station was opened by São Paulo Railway (SPR) on 1 February 1885. After the federal government absorbed the SPR lines, a new station was built and opened in 1964.

After being operated by many federal companies (EFSJ, RFFSA, EBTU and CBTU), the station was transferred to the São Paulo State Government in 1994, through the mixed economy society CPTM.
