= Piqueri (CPTM) =

Railway station in São Paulo, Brazil

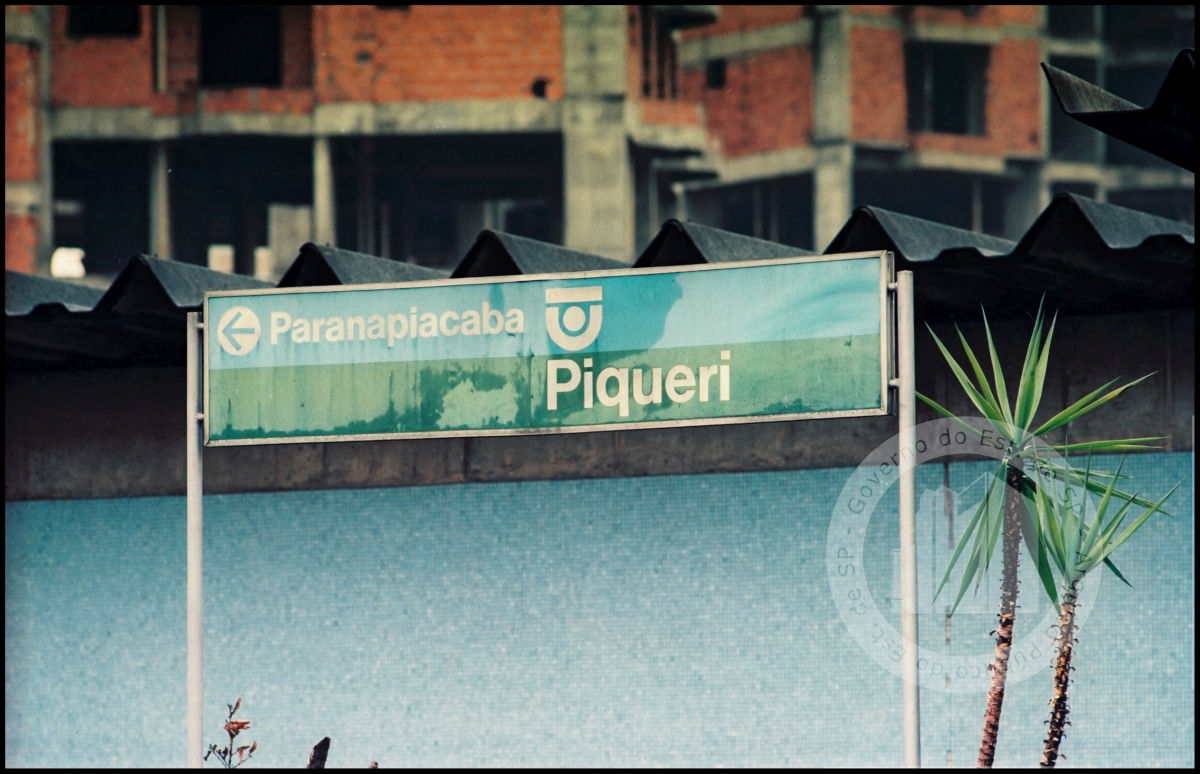

General information
- Location: R. José Peres Campelo, s/n Pirituba; Brazil
- Coordinates: 23.503601°S 46.715487°W
- Owner: Government of the State of São Paulo
- Operator: TIC Trens (Grupo Comporte)
- Platforms: Side platforms

Construction
- Structure type: Surface

Other information
- Station code: PQR

History
- Opened: 1 July 1960
- Rebuilt: August 1975
- Former names: Quilômetro 88; Nossa Senhora do Ó

Services
Preceding station	São Paulo Metropolitan Trains	Following station
Pirituba towards Jundiaí	Line 7	Lapa towards Palmeiras-Barra Funda
Track layout
Location

Piqueri is a train station on TIC Trens Line 7-Ruby, in the district of Pirituba in São Paulo. In the future, it will attend another CPTM line, still with no color or number defined, which should connect Piqueri station with the future Monte Belo station, in Butantã.

== History ==
Piqueri station was opened by Santos-Jundiaí Railway (EFSJ) on 1 June 1960, named Quilômetro 88. Its location was often discussed in the 1960s, as in 1962, the station was renamed to Nossa Senhora do Ó. After much struggle between local associations, the station got its definitive name on 1 November 1969: Piqueri.

Later, RFFSA incorporated EFSJ and built a new station, reopened in August 1975.

Since 2025, it is operated by TIC Trens.
