= Lapa (Line 7) (CPTM) =

CPTM's train station in São Paulo, Brasil

Lapa
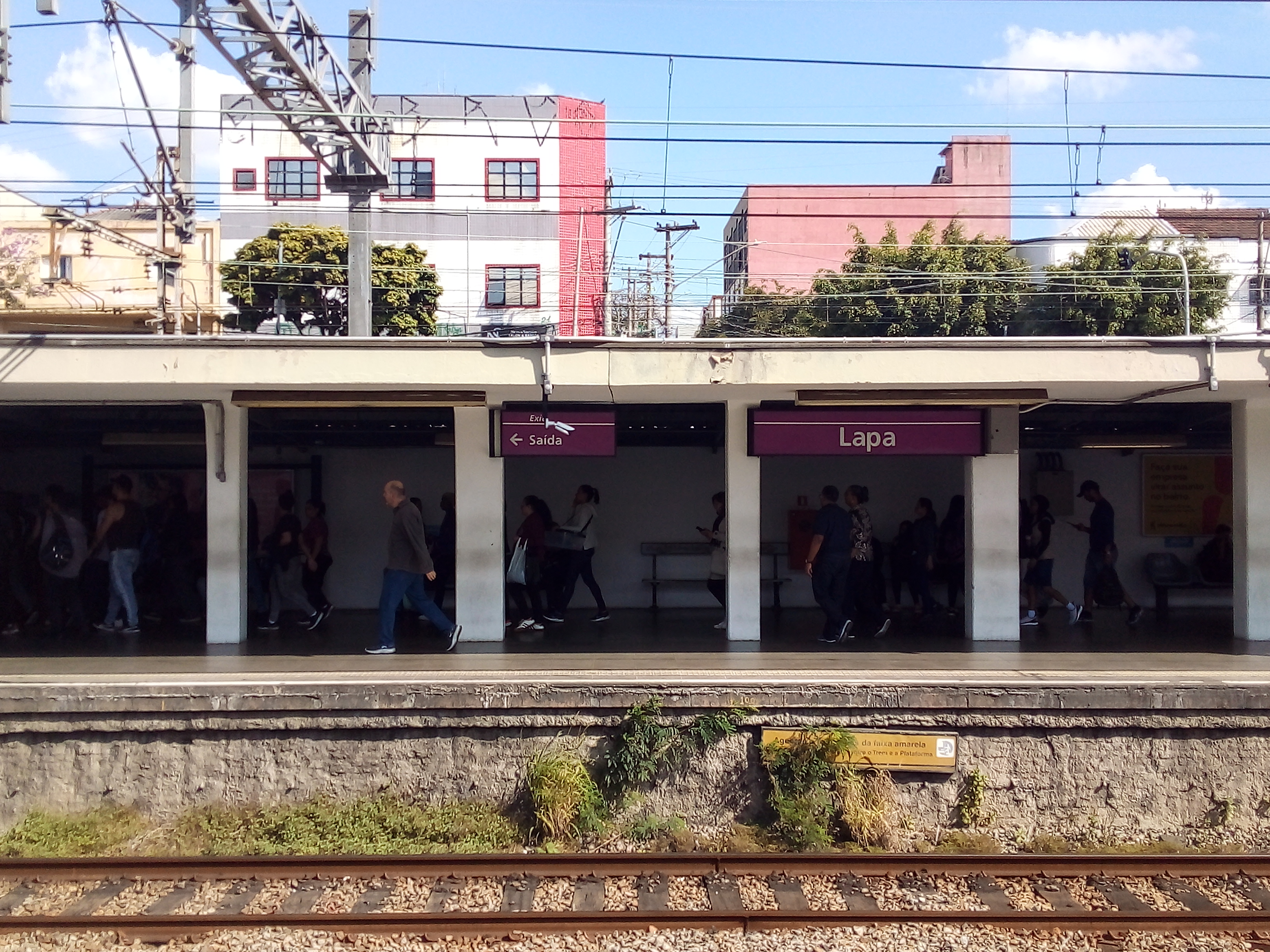
- Station platform.

General information
- Location: R. William Speers, 863; Lapa; Brazil
- Coordinates: 23.517473°S 46.705134°W
- Owner: Government of the State of São Paulo
- Operator: TIC Trens (Grupo Comporte)
- Platforms: Side platforms

Construction
- Structure type: Surface

Other information
- Station code: LPA

History
- Opened: 20 February 1899

Services
Preceding station	São Paulo Metropolitan Trains	Following station
Piqueri towards Jundiaí	Line 7	Água Branca towards Palmeiras-Barra Funda
Future out-of-system interchange
Preceding station	São Paulo Metro	Following station
Santa Marina Terminus	Line 20 (proposed) transfer at Lapa	Vila Romana towards Pref. Celso Daniel-Santo André
Track layout
Location

Lapa is a train station on TIC Trens Line 7-Ruby, in the district of Lapa in São Paulo.

== History ==
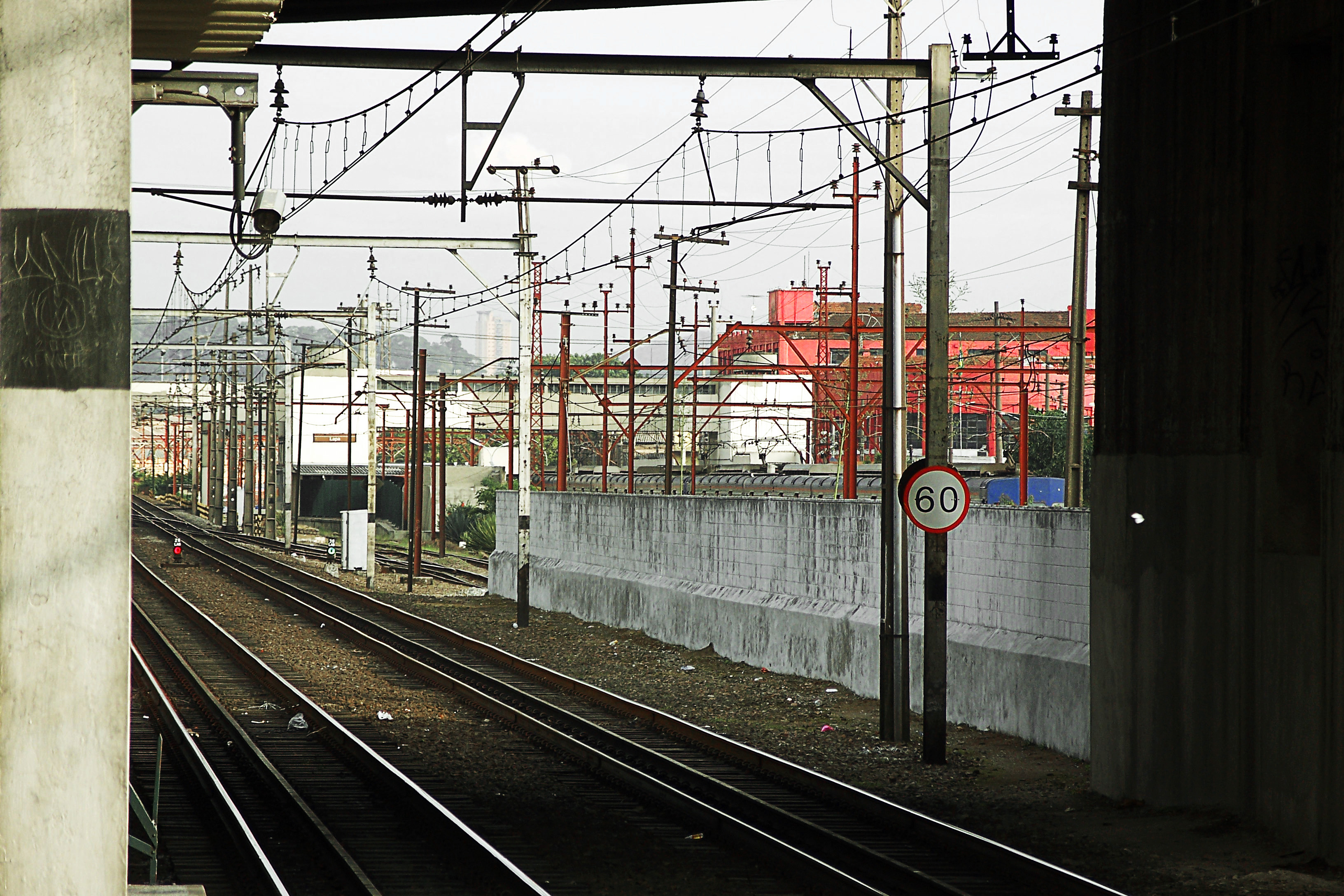
Station viewed from the other Lapa station, 500 metres (1,600 ft) away from it.

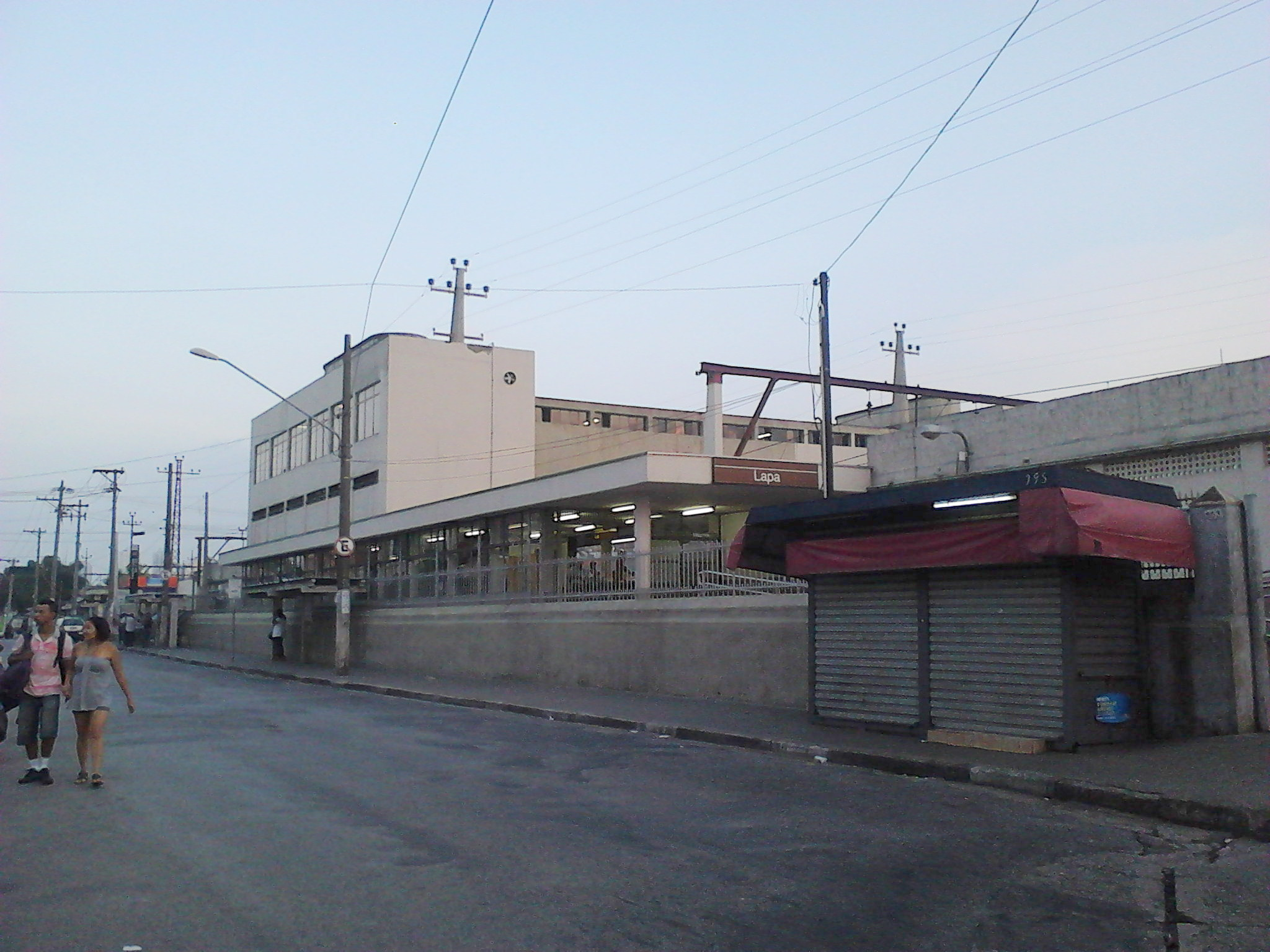
Lapa station photo, viewed from Rua William Speers.

Lapa station was opened by São Paulo Railway on 20 February 1899. In 1947, SPR lines were transferred to the federal government, which created Santos-Jundiaí Railway (EFSJ). Later, EFSJ started the line electrification and rebuilt many stations, among them Lapa station, in the 1950s. In this decade, Lapa station of Sorocaba Railway was built, 500 metres (1,600 ft) away from the EFSJ station.

After the decay of commuter trains, in the 1970s and 1980s, the station was transferred in 1994 to CPTM, which started a small reform in it years later.

== Projects ==
Due to the existence of two Lapa stations, separated by 500 metres (1,600 ft) and without any connection, CPTM elaborated a unification project. Besides the unification, the station should receive one more train line, 8-Diamond, and two Metro lines, 20-Pink (Lapa-Prefeito Saladino) and 23-Magenta (Lapa-Dutra).
