= Subprefecture of Pirituba-Jaraguá =

Coordinates: 23°28′30″S 46°43′25″W

- Subprefecture
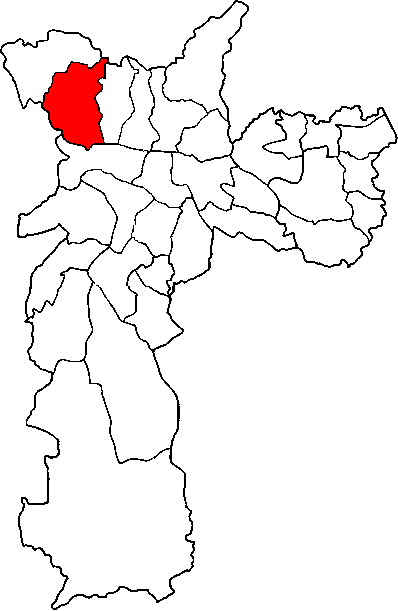
- Location of the Subprefecture of Pirituba-Jaraguá in São Paulo

- Location of municipality of São Paulo within the State of São Paulo
- Country: Brazil
- Region: Southeast
- State: São Paulo
- Municipality: São Paulo
- Administrative Zone: Northwest
- Districts: Pirituba, São Domingos, Jaraguá

Government
  - Type: Subprefecture
  - Subprefect: Sergio Carlos Filho

Area
  - Total: 55.05 km^{2} (21.25 sq mi)

Population (2008)
  - Total: 442,722
- Website: Subprefeitura Pirituba-Jaraguá (Portuguese)

The Subprefecture of Pirituba-Jaraguá is one of 32 subprefectures of the city of São Paulo, Brazil. It comprises three districts: Pirituba, São Domingos, and Jaraguá. The highest point of the municipality of São Paulo, Pico do Jaraguá, is located in this place. It's also where the roads connecting Campinas and the Central-West region of Brazil have the start point.
