= São Domingos (district of São Paulo) =

District of São Paulo, Brazil

Coordinates: 23.5035°S 46.7434°W

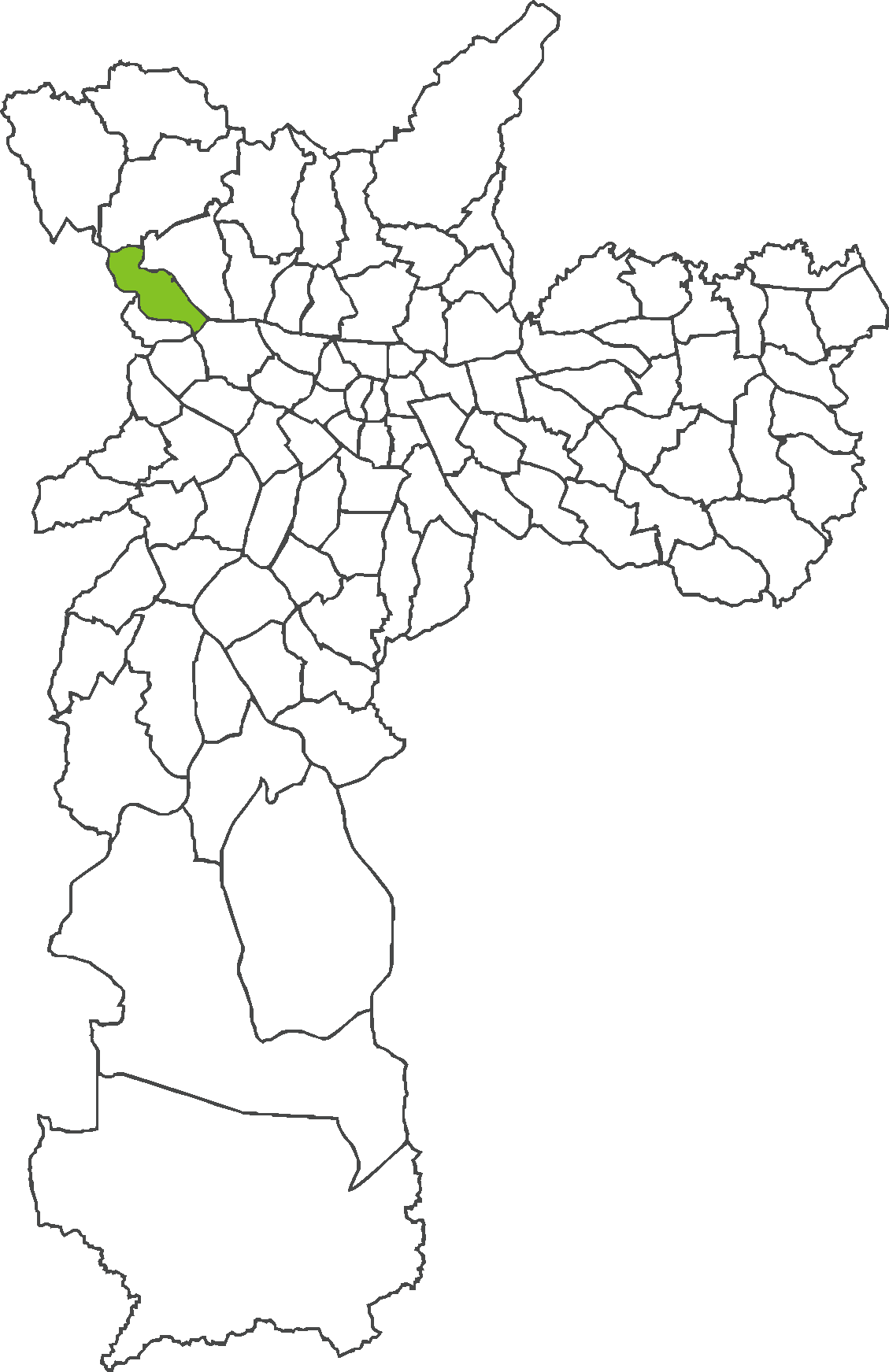
- District of the city of São Paulo
- Country: Brazil
- State: São Paulo
- Municipality: São Paulo
- Subprefecture: Pirituba Jaraguá

Area
  - Total: 10.00 km^{2} (3.86 sq mi)

Population (2007)
  - Total: 84,843
  - Density: 8,484/km^{2} (21,970/sq mi)
- Website: Subprefecture of Pirituba Jaraguá

São Domingos is one of 96 districts in the city of São Paulo, Brazil.
