= Jaraguá (CPTM) =

Railway station in São Paulo, Brazil

Coordinates: 23.4551°S 46.7388°W

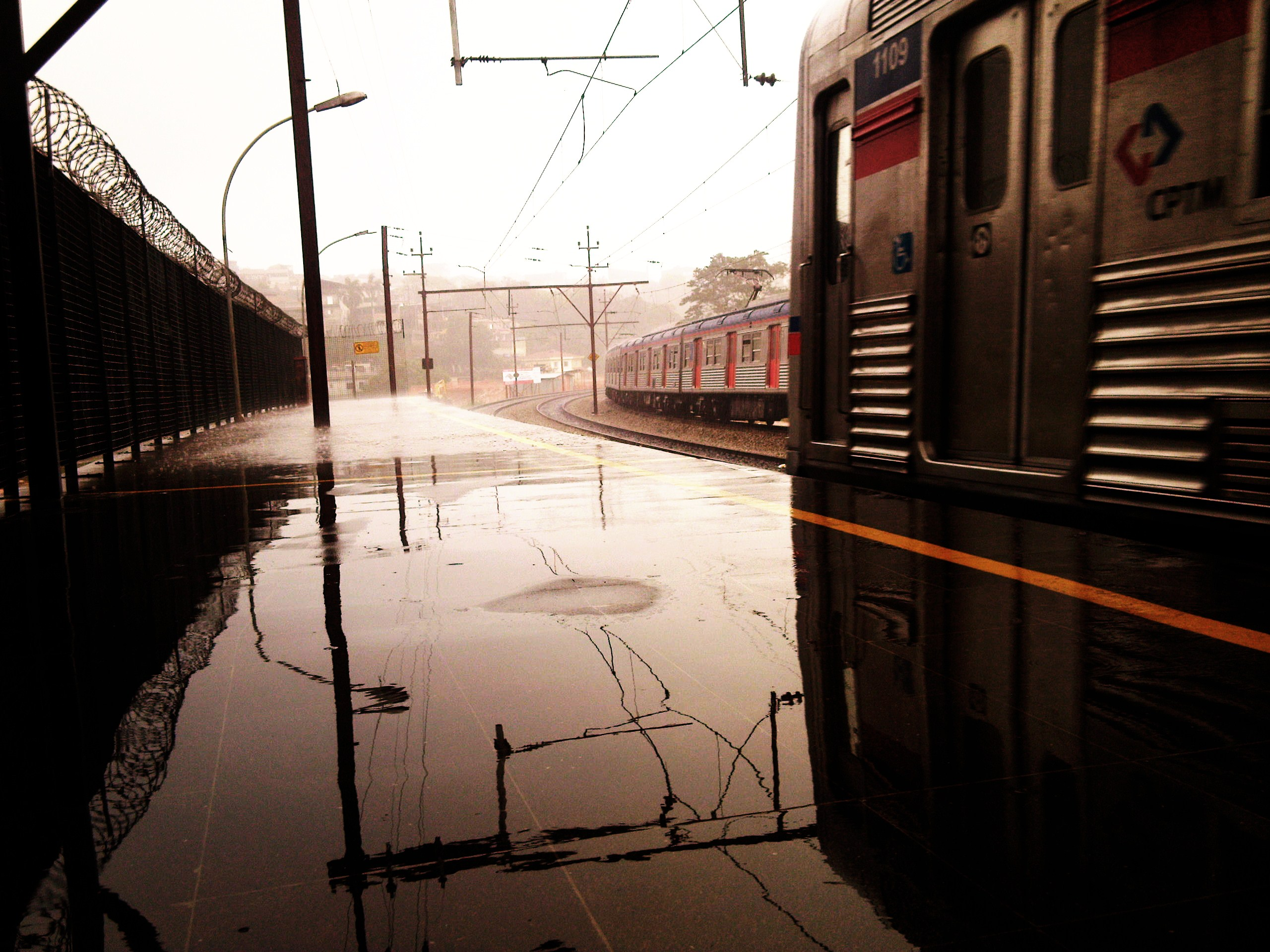
- Rain at Jaraguá railway Station

General information
- Location: Estrada de Taipas, s/n Jaraguá; Brazil
- Owner: Government of the State of São Paulo
- Operator: TIC Trens (Grupo Comporte)
- Platforms: Split platforms

Construction
- Structure type: At-grade

Other information
- Station code: JRG

History
- Opened: 1 October 1891
- Former names: Parada de Taipas; Taipas

Services
Preceding station	São Paulo Metropolitan Trains	Following station
Vila Aurora towards Jundiaí	Line 7	Vila Clarice towards Palmeiras-Barra Funda
Track layout
Location

Jaraguá is a train station on TIC Trens Line 7-Ruby, in the district of Jaraguá in São Paulo. It is the only TIC Trens station that has platforms built in different locations. The station is split in two by Estrada de Taipas. This way, the level crossing is open faster for the local traffic and avoid delays.

== History ==
The station was opened by São Paulo Railway on 1 October 1891, named Taipas. In the 1940s, it was renamed to Jaraguá because of a telegraph post that was next to the station with the same name. The located in the Km 95 of the SP-1452 road.

In 1947, SPR lines were incorporated to the public state company Estrada de Ferro Santos-Jundiaí (EFSJ). Besides many federal administrations, the station didn't go through any improvements, as in the 1970s and 1980s the lines were getting more abandoned. The scrapping of the commuter train system caused a revolt in the commuters, who destroyed many stations, including Jaraguá, which was set on fire on 28 October 1983.

In the following year, the station was reformed in the 1980s, the current building was constructed, and the train system was transferred to another federal company (CBTU). Currently, the building keeps its original characteristics and, since then, it attends the CPTM metropolitan trains, which started operating in 1994.

Jaraguá rail station was certified as a historical site by the CONDEPHAAT (Council of Defence of Historic, Archaeological, Artistic and Touristic Site) on 21 June 2010, by the Circular Letter No, 1453/2010 of Process 60308/2009. The communication letter was published on 22 July 2010. The certification was requested by Ralph Mennucci Giesbrecht in 2006.

Currently, it was announced the rebuilt of many stations, with Jaraguá among them.
