= Jaraguá (district of São Paulo) =

- Neighborhood of São Paulo
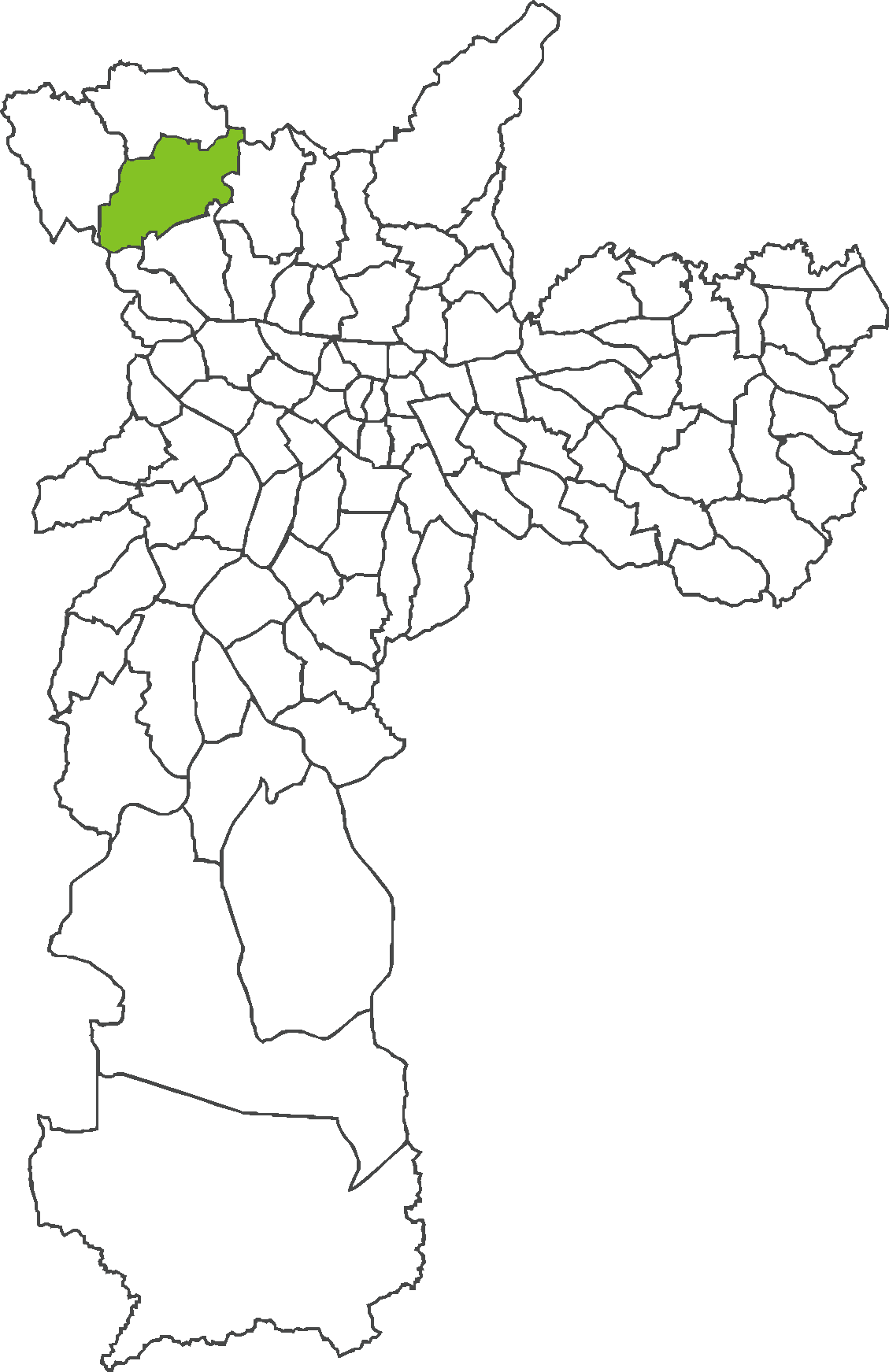
- Location of Jaraguá in São Paulo
- Country: Brazil
- State: São Paulo
- Municipality: São Paulo
- Subprefecture: Pirituba Jaraguá

Government
  - Type: Subprefecture

Area
  - Total: 27.60 km^{2} (10.66 sq mi)

Population (2007)
  - Total: 184,818
  - Density: 6,696/km^{2} (17,340/sq mi)
- HDI: 0.791 medium
- Website: Subprefecture of Pirituba Jaraguá

Jaraguá (means "Grotto of the Lord", "Valley Guard" or Lord of the Valley in Ancient Tupian language) is a district located in the northwest zone of the Brazilian city of São Paulo, which became a district in 1948, in areas divided from Perus, Pirituba and the former sub-district of "Nossa Senhora do Ó". Jaraguá borders the municipalities of Osasco to the west, and Caieiras to the north. Also with the districts of Perus, Anhanguera, Brasilândia, São Domingos and Pirituba.

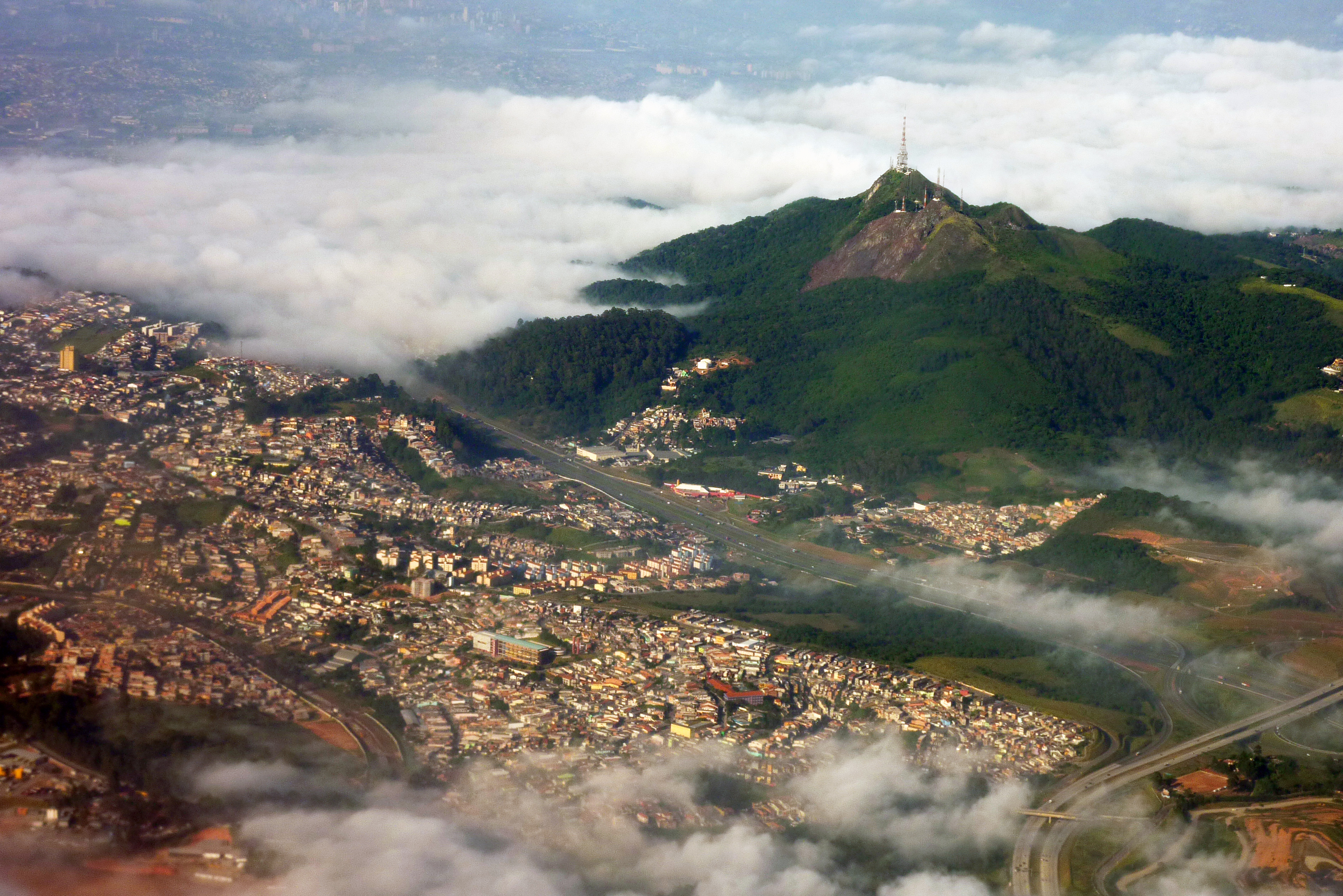
Jaraguá aerial shot.

In 1968, the former Brazilian Telephone Company (CTB) built a small building in the neighborhood to serve as a telephone center. The cost of the telephone line, to be acquired by would-be subscribers through the system of "expansion plans" managed by the Telebrás (a Brazilian state company, responsible for implementing the Public Telecommunications Policies in Brazil.system), however, that were not enough interested parties to start operating the service in the neighborhood. It was only in 1984 that Jaraguá began to have automatic telephone service installed by TELESP (Telecommunications of São Paulo S/A), initially with 4,000 terminals that operated with the prefix 841. Currently, approximately 89,000 terminals are installed in the district's telephone center.

The Railway Station that bears the same name as the neighborhood was built by the São Paulo Railway Company and opened in 1891 under the name of Taipas, at the time known as "Parada de Taipas", being later officially renamed to "Jaraguá" in 1940.

On March 18, 2010, the Jaraguá viaduct was inaugurated completely". Even with many flaws, Mayor Gilberto Kassab inaugurated one of the most backward works in the city of São Paulo.

This viaduct facilitates the crossing of cars, buses, trucks and other transportation vehicles that previously needed to stop at the Jaraguá Station gate and obliged wait for passenger or freight trains to pass, causing traffic and many accidents with pedestrians.

Bill 384/2017, authored by councilor Fábio Riva, which creates the Jaraguá/Taipas Regional City Hall, is pending before the Municipal Chamber of São Paulo.

== Neighborhoods ==
=== Jaraguá (Center) ===
It is the center of the district, where Largo da Matriz is located, and the Church Nossa Sra. da Conceição, one of the oldest church in the entire region. Next to the church there is also the Monastery House of the Japanese Sisters. There is also the Jaraguá train station on the São Paulo Metropolitan Trains Company line 7 (Ruby), one of the stations listed by the Department of Historical Heritage of São Paulo and still maintains its English architecture from 1891, when it was built. In the neighborhood is located the first masonry-made house in the entire district, where today a flower shop operates. Its access can be through Avenue Jerimanduba, Avenue Dr. Felipe Pinel or Estrada Taipas.

=== Cidade D'Abril ===
Here is located the final point of the bus line Praça Ramos, its main streets are Dr. Mauro de Araujo Ribeiro Street and Dr. Rafael de Araújo Ribeiro Street, where an old street market takes place on Saturdays. There are also some old stores in the region.

=== City Jaraguá ===
A newly made community and a middle-class neighborhood. There has been a great real estate evolution since 2010, when the old neighborhood Retão was taken over by condo buildings and condo residential houses. It houses the technical school ETEC Jaraguá, and also the center mall Cantareira Norte, the largest shopping center in the entire region.

=== Jardim Ipanema ===
It is one of the neighborhoods bordering Rodovia dos Bandeirantes (SP-348 hallway) to the west, it is well served by small shops and bus lines through Alexios Jafet Avenue.

=== Jardim Pirituba ===
Neighborhood crossed by Raimundo Pereira de Magalhães Avenue, commonly confused with the Pirituba district by the reason they are homonyms, even some residents claim to live in Pirituba, but they do not belong and do not even border this district. The neighborhood is well served by shops and bus lines to the center and the west of the City of São Paulo.

=== Jardim Rincão ===
Neighborhood crossed by Estrada das Taipas, with easy access to the beltway Rodoanel. It houses many poor communities and some slum areas.

=== Jardim São João ===
Neighborhood close to the district center between Taipas Road and Friedrich Von Voith Street. Traditional festivities take place at Praça Dois Corações as Festa Junina (June festivals, in English), organized by residents every year. It houses middle class families.

=== Jardim Shangri-La ===
One of the northernmost neighborhoods in the district, close to the border of the Rodoanel and the district of Perus, it is home mainly to poor communities and some lower-class homes. Access is via Estrada das Taipas and Raimundo Pereira de Magalhães Avenue.

=== Jardim Vivan ===
A middle class and upper middle class neighborhood, it houses the former Telesp building and is practically an entirely residential neighborhood with few businesses. In the neighborhood there is an open market on Sundays on Pastoril de Almenara Street. At the highest point of the neighborhood it is possible to have a panoramic view of the district. It is in this neighborhood where the plastic artist and miniaturist Oscar Blóis was born and lived.

=== Parque Nações Unidas ===
This neighborhood that houses a subsidiary of the German steel company Voith. The southernmost part is home to middle-class and upper-middle-class residential condos, where also is housed a Military Police fire brigade. In the center there are middle-class houses and also a park called Parque Senhor do Vale (which means Lord of the Valley Park in reference to the word Jaraguá in old Tupi language), with a multi-sports court, mini dirt field, kiosk and garden areas.

=== Parque Panamericano ===
Neighborhood where a large part of the district's trade is concentrated, and very well served by bus lines to the city center. Accessed via Estrada do Corredor and Estrada das Taipas. Neighborhood has many areas of poor communities, as the famous favela which became known in the media, the “Acherupita” favela, popularly known as Xurupita.

=== Vila Chica Luiza ===
Neighborhood between the left side of Rodovia dos Bandeirantes (SP-348 hallway) and Jaraguá Peak. The neighborhood gives access to the Jaraguá State Park, home to the highest point in the city of São Paulo.

=== Vila Aurora ===
It is located in the extreme northwest of the district on the border with Perus district, and is home to a large percentage of the district's population. Due to the distance from the center of Jaraguá, this neighborhood ended up growing more isolated and in 2013 the CPTM Vila Aurora station was inaugurated, being the second within the district.

There are many others small neighborhoods and communities in the district: Jardim Bandeirantes; Jardim Líder; Parque Taipas; Jardim Zoológico; Vila Hilda; Vila Nossa Senhora da Conceição; Vila Nova Parada; Vila Homero; Jardim Santa Lucrécia; Vila Santo Antônio; Jardim Alvina; Jardim Marilu; Estancia Jaraguá; Vila Ana Rosa; Jardim Rodrigo; Jardim Donária; Vila Santo Estevão Reis; Jardim Capela da Lagoa and Vila Nova Jaraguá.

Some Housing Complexes in the district, due to their size and local relevance, almost have the status of a neighborhood, some of them are: Vista Alegre Housing Complexes; Santa Marta Housing Complexes; Bandeirantes Residencial Complexes; Alpes do Jaraguá Residential Complexes; Housing Complexes VOITH; São Marcos Portal; COHAB Pedra Bonita; Housing Complexes Jardim Brasilia; COHAB Pirituba; Housing Complexes Brigadeiro Eduardo Gomes; Housing Complexes Brasilândia.

== Tourism ==
In the Jaraguá district are located: tourist points (as the Jaraguá Peak and the Serra da Cantareira State Park), recreation areas, logistics centers, in addition to important highways and avenues for the city of São Paulo. The most representative ones are: Rodovia dos Bandeirantes; Raimundo Pereira de Magalhães Avenue (former São Paulo-Campinas Road); Jaraguá Tourist Road; Dr. Felipe Pinel Avenue; Estrada de Taipas; Cantídio Sampaio Avenue; Elísio Teixeira Leite Avenue;

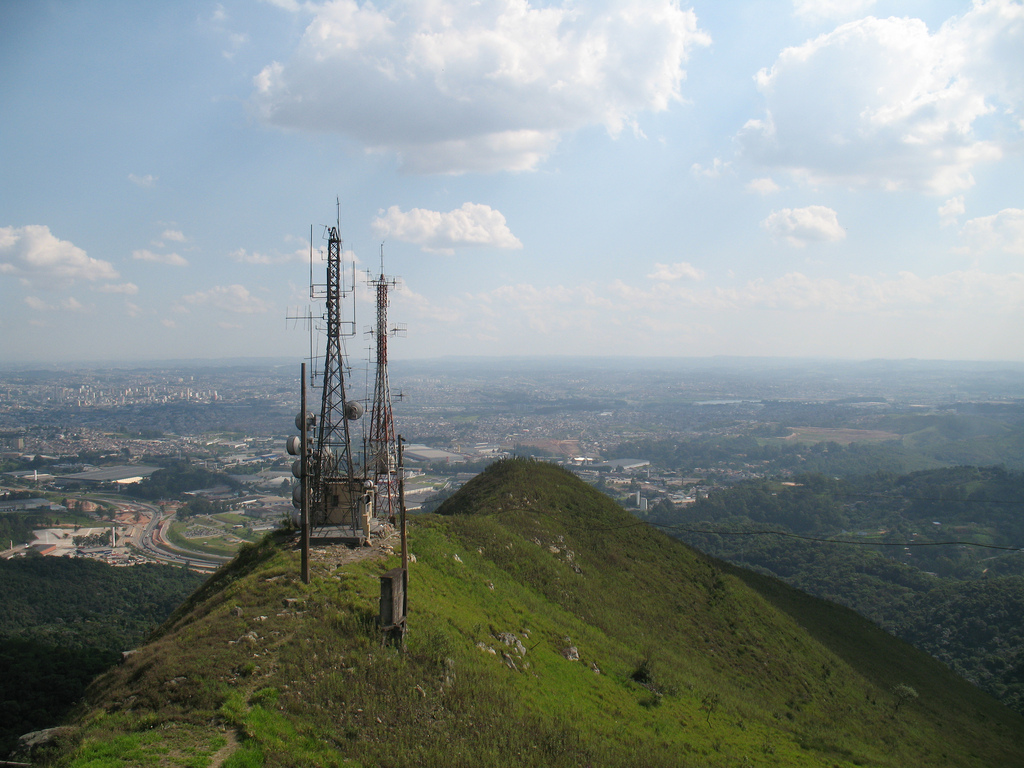
View from the top of Jaraguá's Peak

== Jaraguá Peak ==
Jaraguá Peak (in Portuguese Pico do Jaraguá) is a mountain open to tourist visitation that offers viewpoints from the highest location of the City of São Paulo, where is possible to see a great part of the City of São Paulo as well. On its summit are located several television and radio relays. It is a very popular place for residents and tourists, including for the practice of physical activities such as walking, running and cycling, in addition to offering trails that take the visitor from the lowest parts to the highest parts of the mountain.

== Jaragua State Park ==
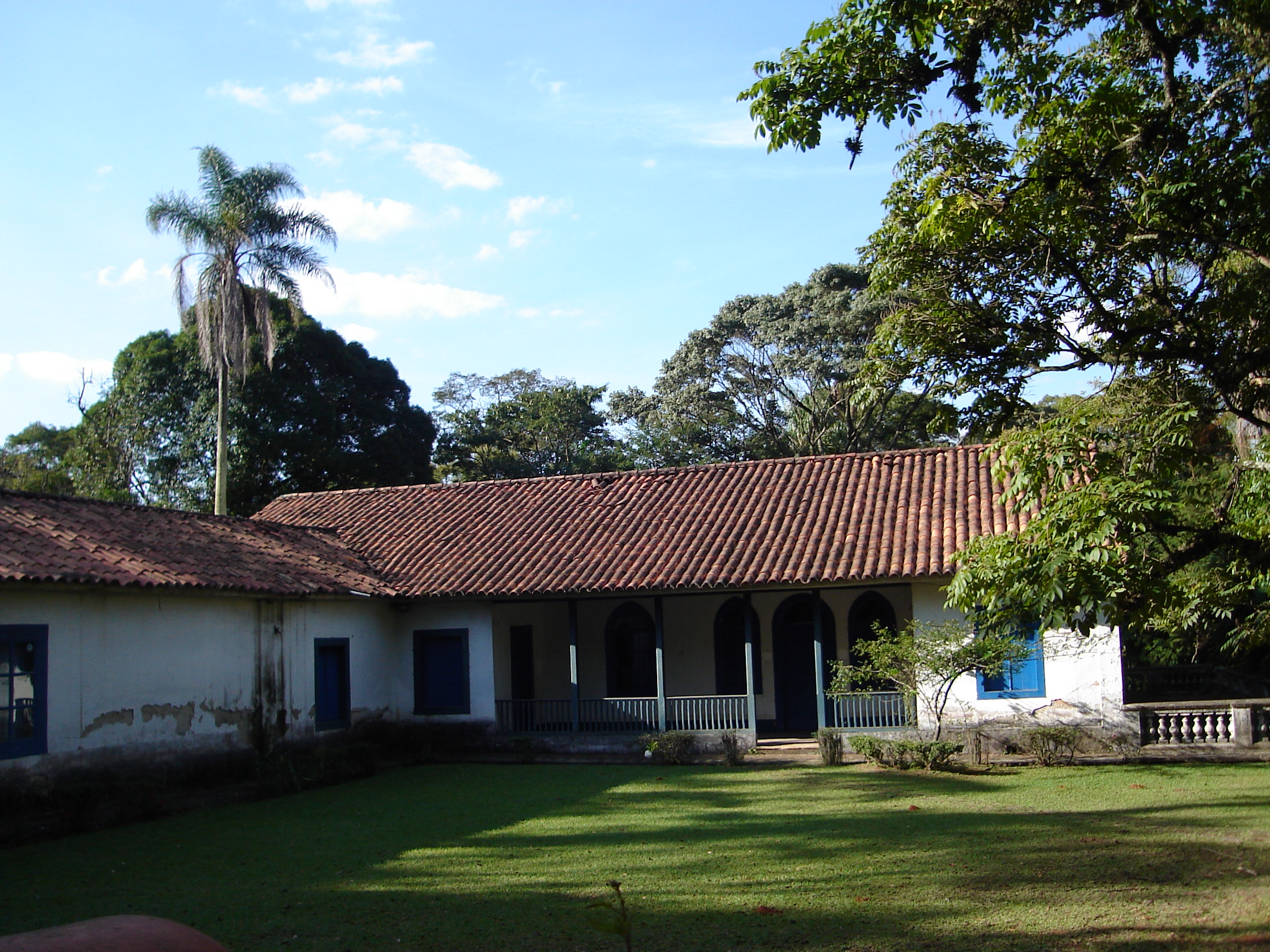
Afonso Sardinha's Estate, located in Jaraguá State Park

The Jaraguá State Park is formed by remaining areas of the Atlantic Forest, since 1994 it integrates the called Green Belt of the city of São Paulo (which includes the Serra da Cantareira that borders the entire North Zone of São Paulo) which was recognized as Biosphere Reserve by UNESCO. In the Jaraguá State Park are located historical constructions as a rammed earth-made house that was the residence of Afonso Sardinha, one of the most famous Brazilian bandeirantes.

== Access ==
The district is crossed by the Anhanguera and Bandeirantes highways, by Line 7–Rubi of the São Paulo Metropolitan Trains, with two stations: Vila Aurora and Jaraguá, and by avenues such as Dr. Felipe Pinel Avenue and Raimundo Pereira de Magalhães Avenue (former connection between the cities of São Paulo and Campinas).

=== Productive sector ===
In the District of Jaraguá, important national and multinational companies are located, such as the distribution center of Grupo Pão de Açúcar and the German steel company Voith, which has many employees from the neighborhood.
