= Pirituba =

District of São Paulo, Brazil

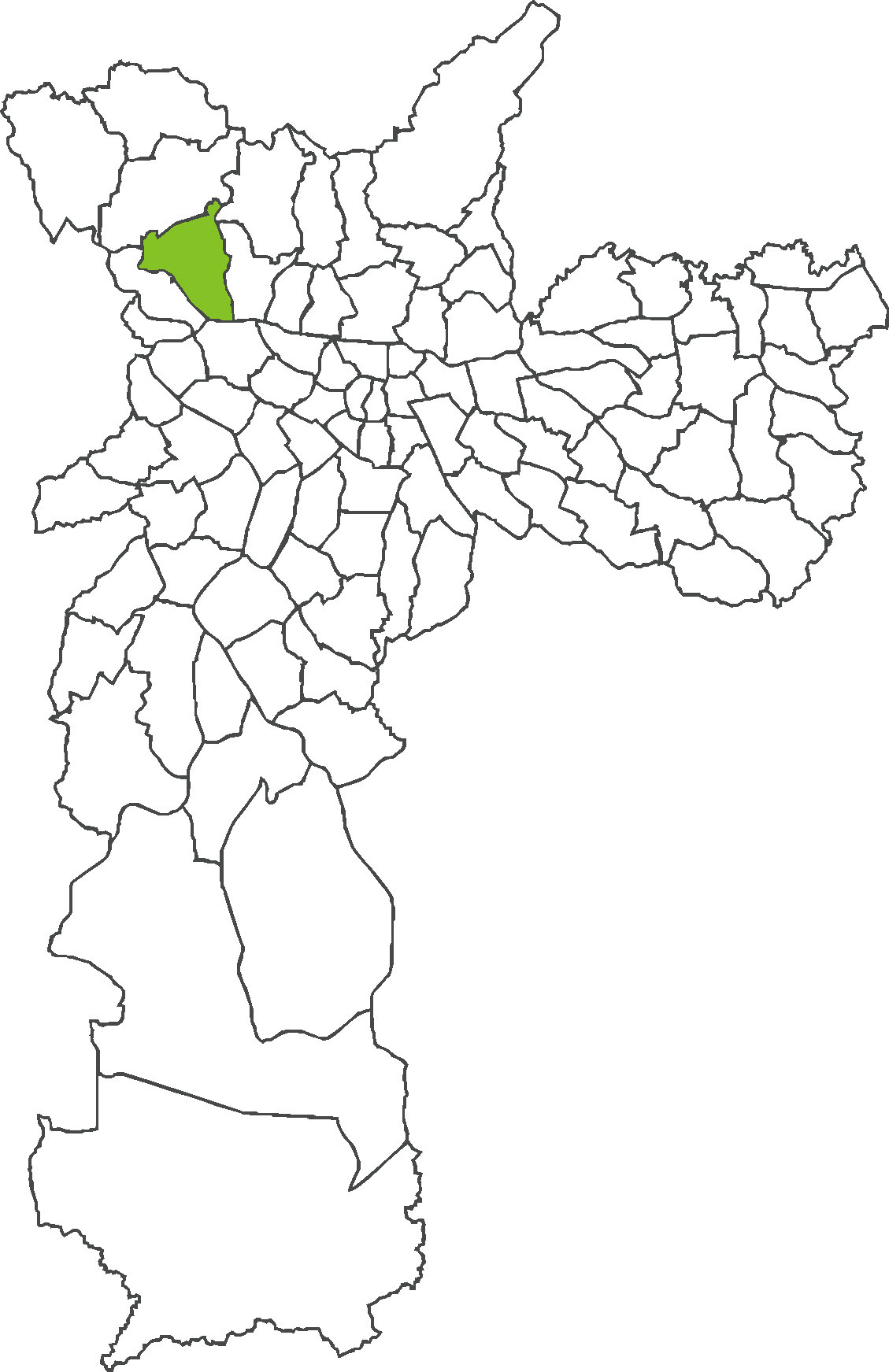
- Location in the city of São Paulo
- Country: Brazil
- State: São Paulo
- City: São Paulo

Government
  - Type: Subprefecture

Population (2004)
  - Total: 161.796
- HDI: 0.841 –high
- Website: Subprefecture of Pirituba

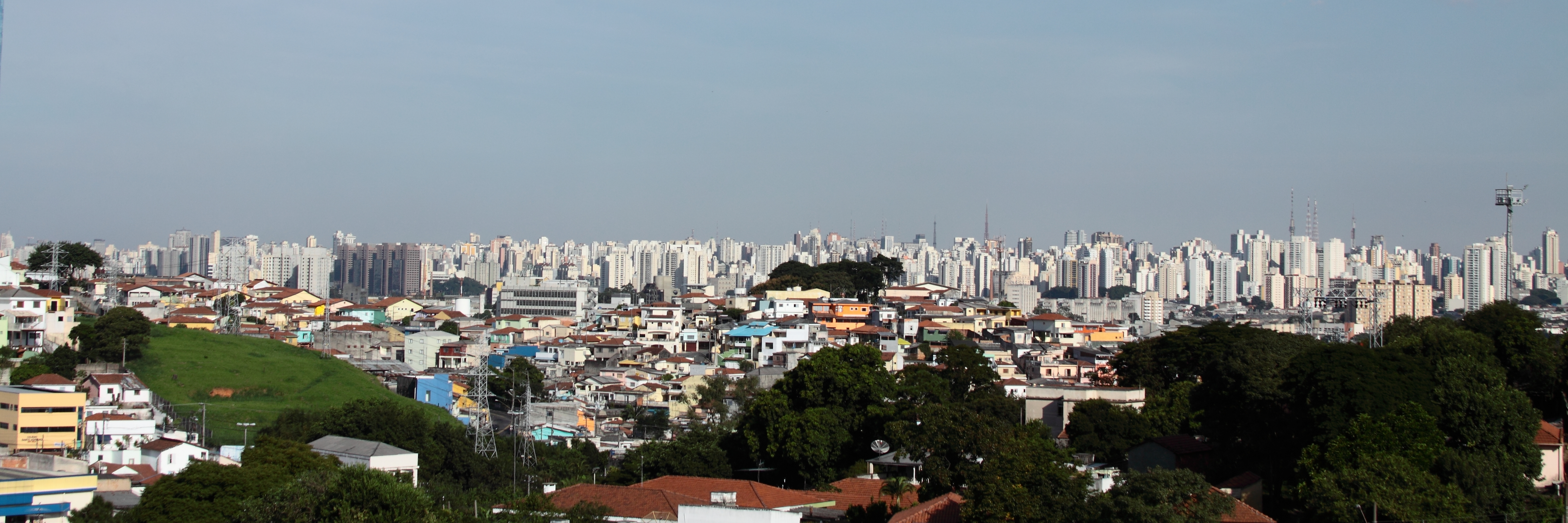
Panoramic View

Pirituba is a district in the subprefecture of Pirituba-Jaraguá in the city of São Paulo, Brazil. It is located in the northwestern side of the city. A person who lives in Pirituba is often called "piritubano".

It is located near roads such as Marginal Tietê, Rodovia dos Bandeirantes and Rodovia Anhanguera. It borders the districts of Lapa, São Domingos, Freguesia do Ó, Brasilândia and Jaraguá.

Pirituba's name origin is the juxtaposition of the Tupi language words piri (Southern cattail, a marshland plant of the Typha genus) and tuba ("many").

== History ==
In the 19th century, the lands where Pirituba now lies were occupied by coffee farms (Portuguese: fazenda), such as Fazenda Barreto (owned by Luís Pereira Barreto), Fazenda Anastacio (owned by Anastacio de Freitas Trancoso and later by Rafael Tobias de Aguiar), and Fazenda Jaraguá.

In 1885, the São Paulo Railway opened a train station in Pirituba as part of the Estrada de Ferro Santos-Jundiaí line.

When the owner of the Fazenda Barreto died in 1922, the land was split between his heirs. In the same year the farm's first share was settled, and in 1926 the second share was settled. Those two settlements, together with the initial nucleus established by the train station, become the district's core for development.

== Sports ==
Pirituba has a strong tradition in sports. One of the first rugby teams of Brazil is from Pirituba, and it has one of the biggest baseball fields in the country. There is a strong pedigree of football players and the sport is very popular in the area. Famous Arsenal footballer, Gabriel Magalhães grew up in the area.

== Attractions in Pirituba ==
- Casa de Nassau - Dutch immigrants' club
- Casarão do Anastácio - Fazenda Anastácio's farmhouse
- Parque Cidade de Toronto (Toronto City Park) - opened on July 1, 1992, in a partnership with the Canadian city
- Pico do Jaraguá

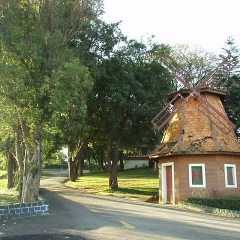
"Casa de Nassau"
