= Quitaúna (CPTM) =

Railway station in São Paulo, Brazil

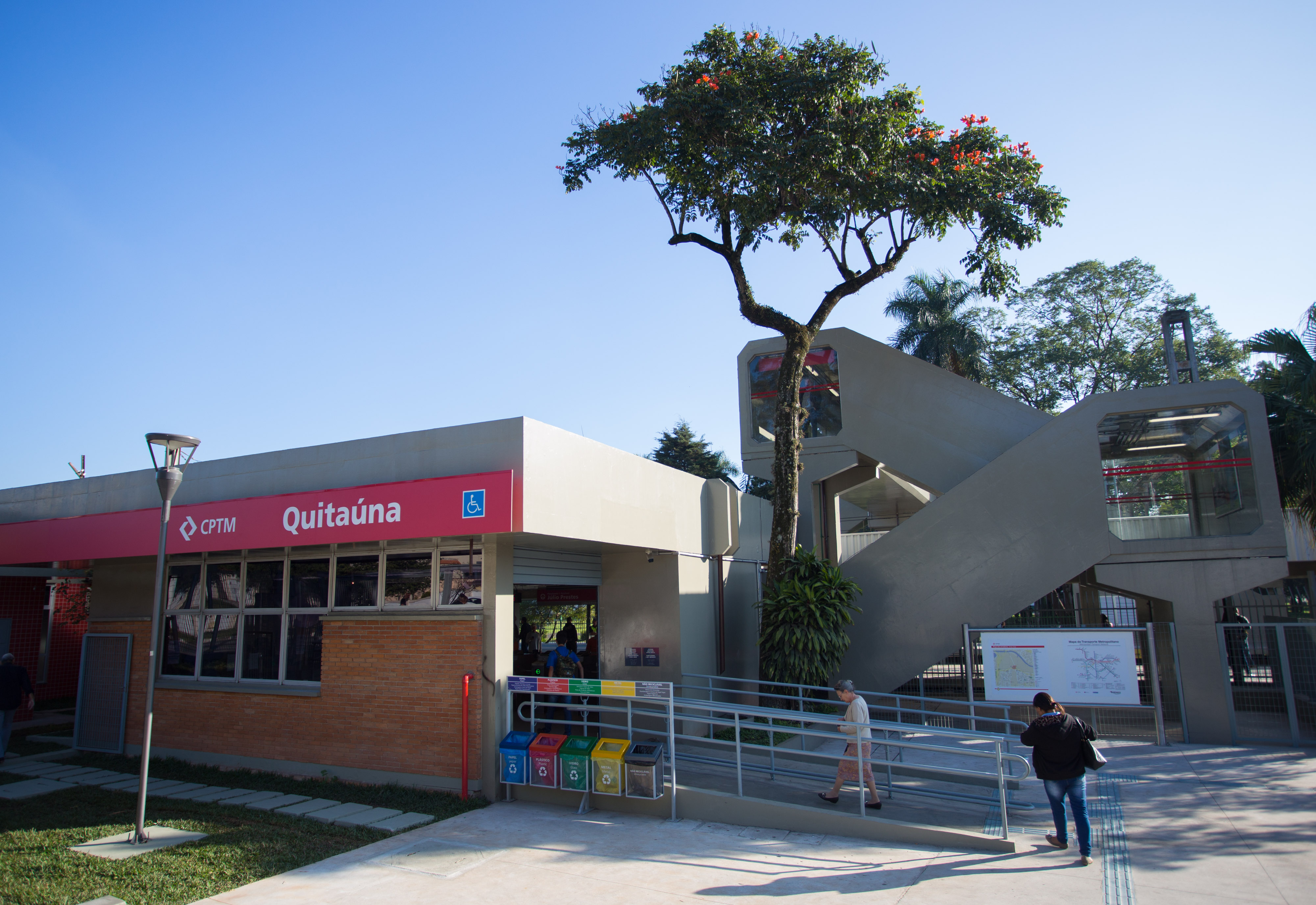
- Station in 2017.

General information
- Location: Av. dos Autonomistas, 6194; Km 18; Brazil
- Coordinates: 23.522785°S 46.807112°W
- Owner: Government of the State of São Paulo
- Operator: ViaMobilidade Linhas 8 e 9 (Motiva)
- Platforms: Side and island platforms
- Connections: Itapevi–Butantã Metropolitan Corridor

Construction
- Structure type: At-grade

Other information
- Station code: QTU

History
- Opened: 29 May 1929
- Rebuilt: 25 January 1979
- Former names: Duque de Caxias

Services
Preceding station	São Paulo Metropolitan Trains	Following station
General Miguel Costa towards Amador Bueno	Line 8	Comandante Sampaio towards Júlio Prestes
Track layout
Location

Quitaúna is a train station, belonging to ViaMobilidade Linhas 8 e 9 Line 8-Diamond, located in the municipality of Osasco.

== History ==
Built by Estrada de Ferro Sorocabana (EFS) on 29 May 1929, in the district of Quitaúna. In 1934, the main building was renovated, due to the increase of commuter demand. With the installation of Brazilian Army Headquarters at the end of the 1930s and beginning of the 1940s, the station was renamed Duque de Caxias, with this name used between 1939 and 1948. On 8 April 1953, the station received a new building. In 1971, FEPASA absorbed EFS and rebuilt the station, which was reopened on 25 January 1979. In 1996, CPTM absorbed the old FEPASA West Line, renaming it Line B-Grey. In March 2008, the line was renamed again to Line 8-Diamond.
