= Comandante Sampaio (CPTM) =

Railway station in São Paulo, Brazil

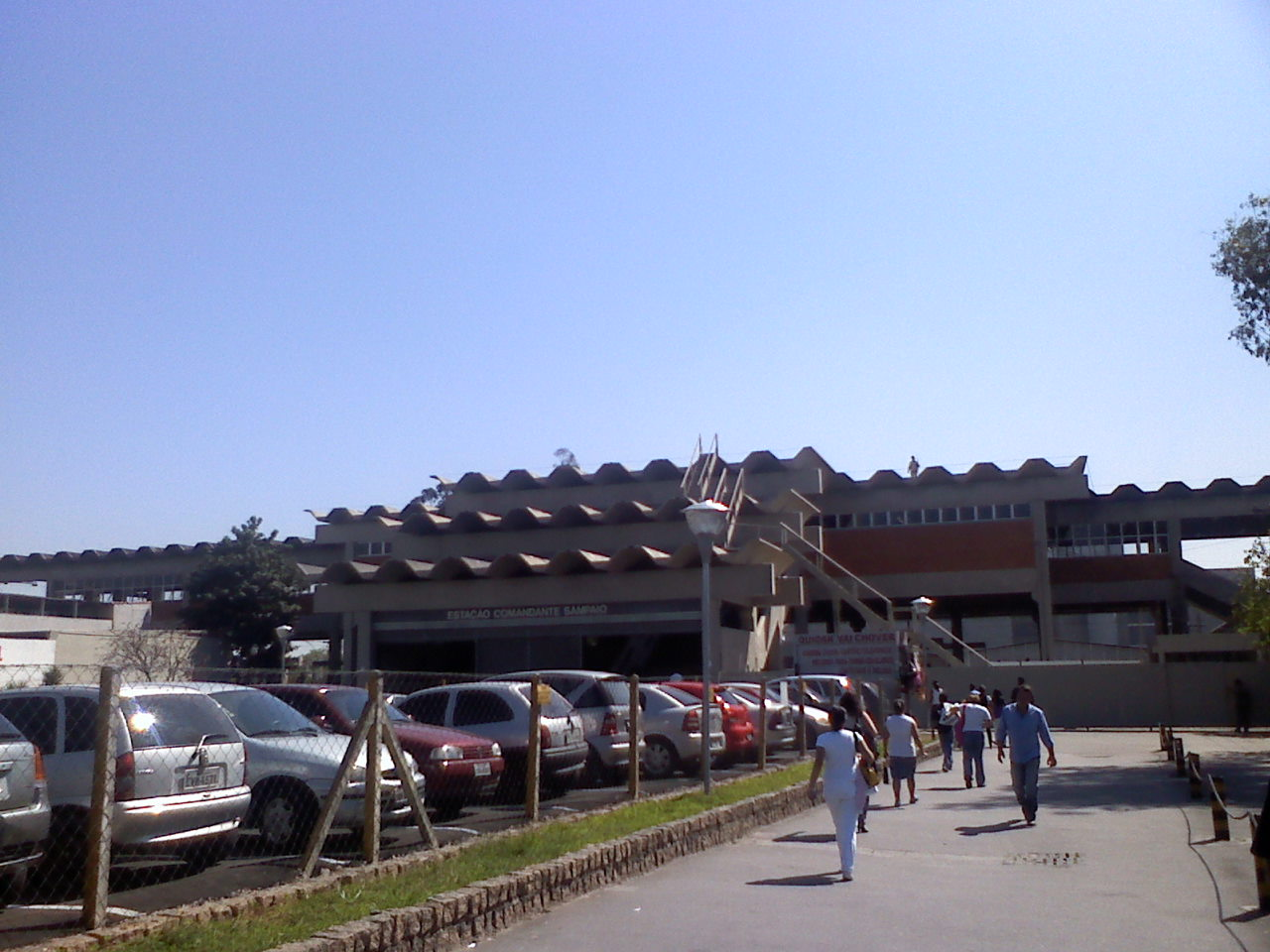

General information
- Location: Av. dos Autonomistas, 5100; Km 18; Brazil
- Coordinates: 23.525756°S 46.795637°W
- Owner: Government of the State of São Paulo
- Operator: ViaMobilidade Linhas 8 e 9 (Motiva)
- Platforms: Island platforms
- Connections: Itapevi–Butantã Metropolitan Corridor

Construction
- Structure type: At-grade

Other information
- Station code: CSA

History
- Opened: 12 October 1946
- Rebuilt: 25 January 1979
- Former names: Km 18; General Sampaio

Services
| Preceding station | São Paulo Metropolitan Trains | Following station |
|---|---|---|
| Quitaúna towards Amador Bueno | Line 8 | Osasco towards Júlio Prestes |
Track layout
Location

Comandante Sampaio is a rail station belonging to ViaMobilidade Linhas 8 e 9 Line 8-Diamond, located in the city of Osasco, in the Km 18 borough.

== History ==
Opened on 12 October 1946 by Estrada de Ferro Sorocabana, the station had two official names: General Sampaio and Comandante Sampaio, both in tribute to General Antônio de Sampaio, hero of the Paraguayan War and patron of the infantry of the Brazilian Army, being the 2nd second name who prevailed.

The original station was built where the current Viaduct Presidente Tancredo Neves is located, in 1986. In 1971, Ferrovia Paulista S/A (FEPASA) absorbed EFS, and remodeled the West Line, and Comandante Sampaio station was rebuilt on 25 January 1979. Besides FEPASA had expropriated an area in front of the main access of the station for the construction of a bus terminal, the work wasn't executed and the area became a car park.

In 1996, CPTM assumed the operation of the station and the line.

=== Project ===
Between November 2004 and March 2005, CPTM published bidding no. 8379402011, aiming the modernization of 12 station, divided in 6 lots. Station Comandante Sampaio was part of Lot 1, along with station Domingos de Moraes. This lot was won by Sistema Pri/Engecorps Consortium by the value of R$ 492,852.00 (US$ 134,887.51 in 2018).

The architectural project of remodeling was made between 2005 and 2007 by Escritório N&W Arquitetos, of Nelson Andrade and Wilson Edson Jorge. Besides it was concluded, no construction works was hired until this time.
