= General Miguel Costa (CPTM) =

Railway station in São Paulo, Brazil

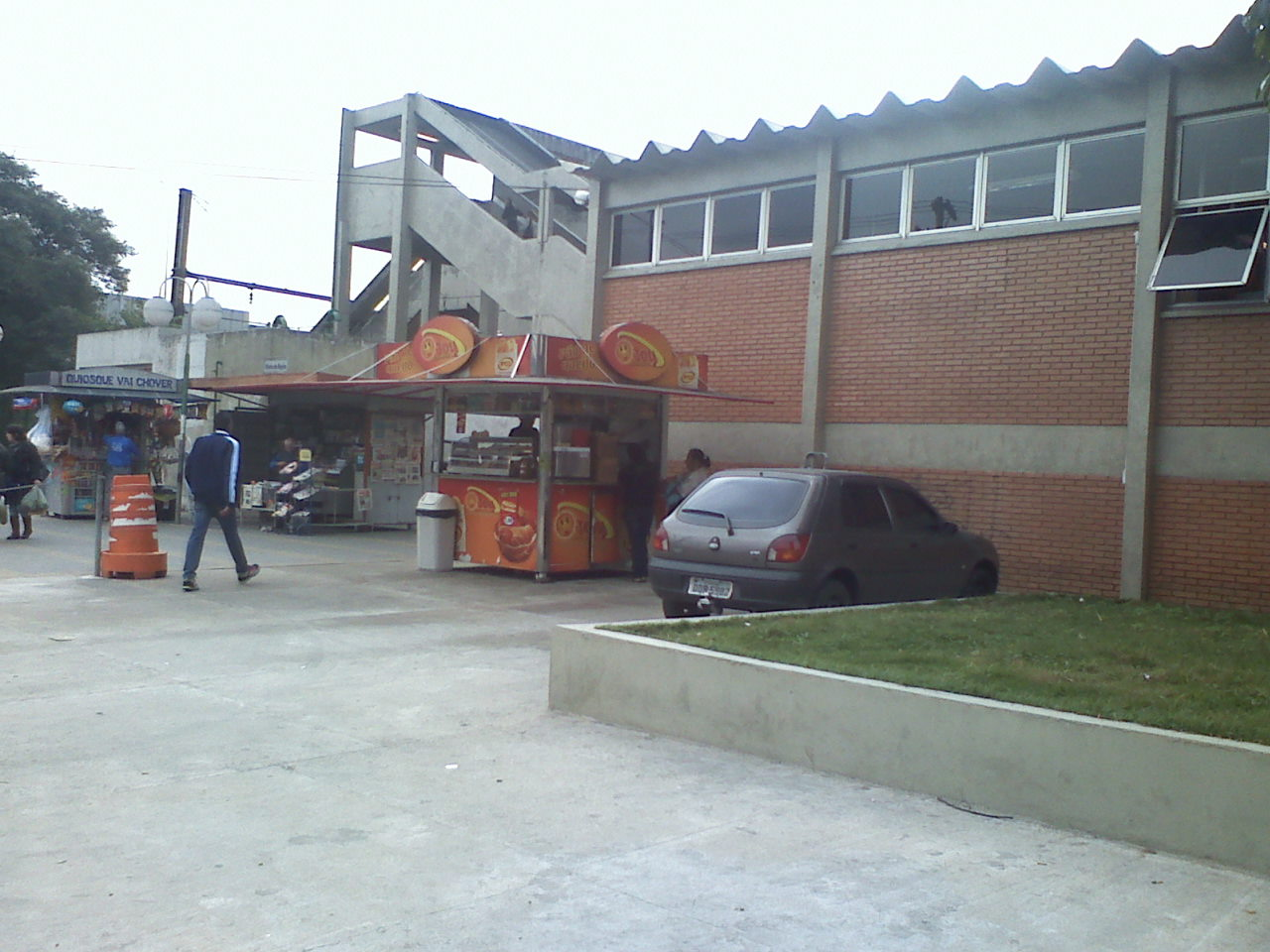

General information
- Location: Av. dos Autonomistas, s/nº Km 18; Brazil
- Coordinates: 23.523779°S 46.737562°W
- Owner: Government of the State of São Paulo
- Operator: ViaMobilidade Linhas 8 e 9 (Motiva)
- Platforms: Side and island platforms
- Connections: Luiz Bortolosso Metropolitan Terminal; Itapevi–Butantã Metropolitan Corridor

Construction
- Structure type: At-grade

Other information
- Station code: GMC

History
- Opened: Mid-1951
- Rebuilt: 25 January 1979
- Former names: Km 21; Matadouro

Services
Preceding station	São Paulo Metropolitan Trains	Following station
Carapicuíba towards Amador Bueno	Line 8	Quitaúna towards Júlio Prestes
Track layout
Location

General Miguel Costa is a train station, belonging to ViaMobilidade Linhas 8 e 9 Line 8-Diamond, located in the municipality of Osasco, Brazil.

== History ==
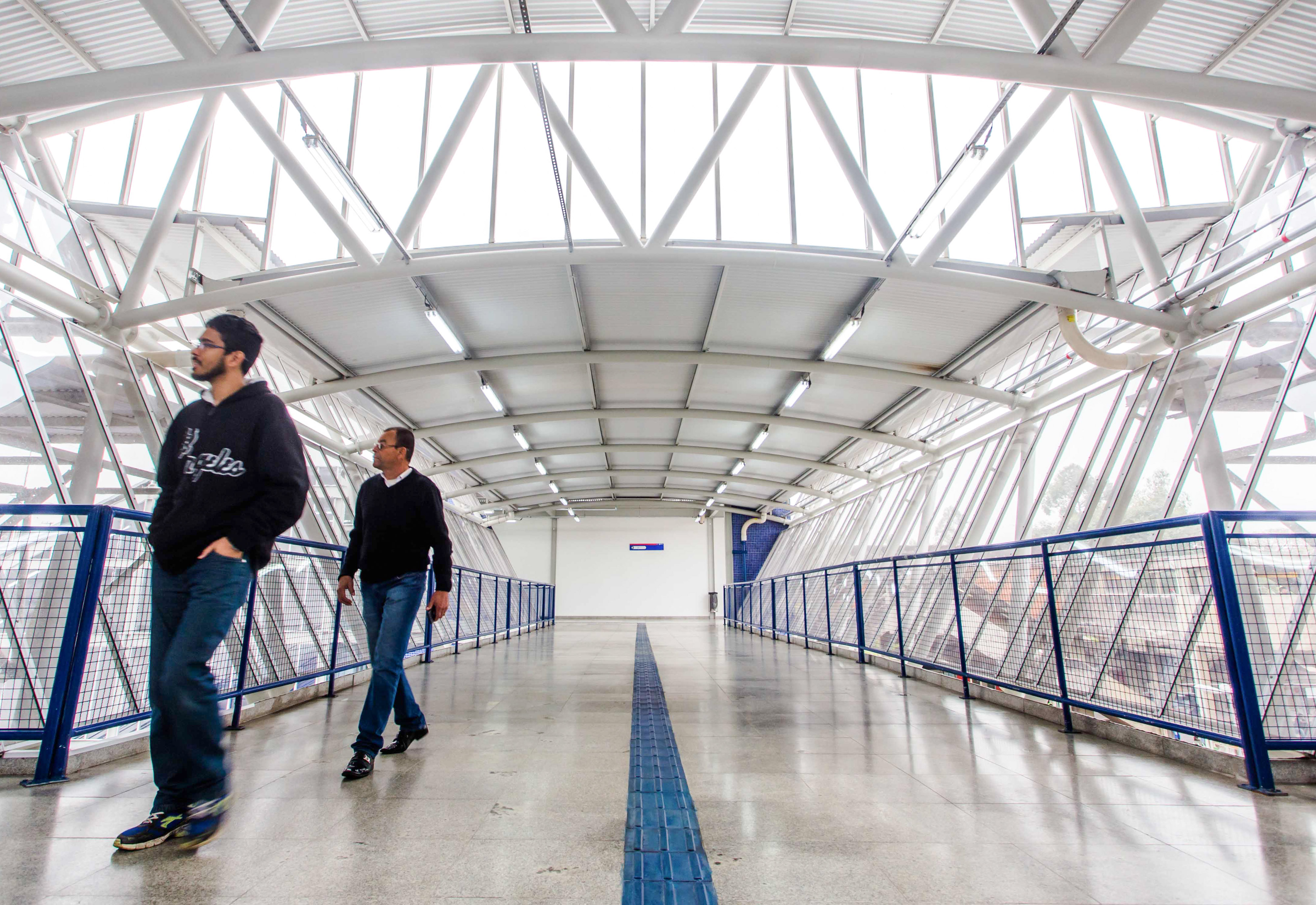
View of the access catwalk to Luiz Bortolosso Metropolitan Terminal.

With the expansion of São Paulo, the supply of inhabitants became a vital issue. Until then, the city had the Vila Mariana Slaughterhouse to supply the city with fresh meat. This structure became outdated in the beginning of the 1910s and obligated the government to authorize interested businessmen to build new slaughterhouses. One of these was planned by Colonel Delfino Cerqueira. Authorized by Municipal Resolution no. 50 of 20 August 1914, Colonel Cerqueira implanted in 1920 a slaughterhouse, located by Kilometer 21 of the main line of Estrada de Ferro Sorocabana. With the construction of the slaughterhouse, Sorocabana built a train yard to receive cargo wagons that transported oxen to the slaughter. Besides Cerqueira's interests in having a station beside the Kilometer 21 Slaughterhouse, his application was archived by the municipality in 1924. The slaughterhouse was instituted in 1938 and operated until the mid-1960s, when it was deactivated.

In 1951, Quilômetro 21 stop was built, in front of the old slaughterhouse, which became the popular name of the small station. With the deactivation and abandonment of the slaughterhouse in the 1960s, its facilities were invaded and transformed into slums that evolved into a huge favela beside the station. In the mid-1960s, Sorocabana renamed the station to Matadouro, creating protests of the residents of the housings built by Cohab-SP nearby the station in 1972.

In 1996, the station (and West and South Lines) were transferred from FEPASA to CPTM. While the south access of the station, built over the tracks, became as the main access, the north access was built and underused, due to giving access to an empty area of 100,000 m^{2} (1,100,000 sq ft) and was closed to avoid income evasion.

In 2002, Rodoanel Mario Covas was built over the station and the favela was entirely removed. Later, in 2007, the Prefecture of Osasco hired the architecture office Vigliecca e Associados to project a housing in the area of 97,757 m^{2} (1,052,250 sq ft) next to the north access of the station. With a capacity for 1592 housing units, the works for Miguel Costa housing, named after the nearby station, delayed to begin. Besides that, the capacity was reduced to 960 housing units. The first ones were scheduled to be delivered in 2018, despite the lack of road access (due to the area be surrounded by areas belonging to the Army) delayed the deliver to mid-2019.

Projected since 1978, Luiz Bortolosso Metropolitan Terminal was built only in 2017, receiving in majority municipal bus lines of Carapicuíba, besides it was a bus terminal and stop for municipal lines of Osasco and ARTESP metropolitan lines. Despite the construction of these developments, General Miguel Costa station didn't receive modernization works of its outdated structure until this day, which complicates its use and connection to the bus terminal by commuters.

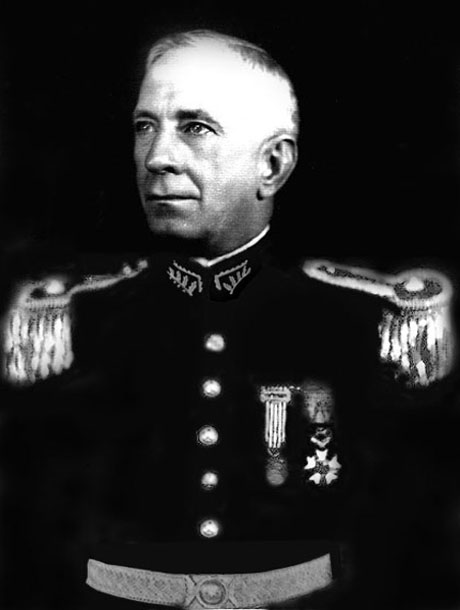
Miguel Costa (no date)

== Toponymy ==
Opened in 1951, the station initially received the name of the nearest milestone, Km 21. In the mid-1960s, Estrada de Ferro Sorocabana changes its name to Matadouro, due to a facility located next to the station. The deactivation of the slaughterhouse and the negative connotation of its name obligated FEPASA to rename the station back to its old name only in 1979.

A campaign led by professor Miguel Costa Júnior to rename the station after his father, Miguel Costa, was succeeded and resulted in the renaming of the station from Km 21 to General Miguel Costa in December 1987 through State Law Project no. 5832 of 20 October 1987.

Miguel Costa (1885-1959) was an official of São Paulo Public Force, one of the main participants of the 1924 tenentism uprising, of Coluna Prestes (which he led along with Luís Carlos Prestes, the Revolution of 1930 and the 1932 Constitutionalist Revolution. According to his son, Miguel Costa was a frequent visitor of the region and, due to his rank, used to stop the train circulation in the area, so he and his accompaniment could fish in a nearby lake. Later, Miguel Costa's family radicated themselves in Carapicuíba.
