= Domingos de Moraes (CPTM) =

Railway station in São Paulo, Brazil

Coordinates: 23.5188°S 46.7215°W

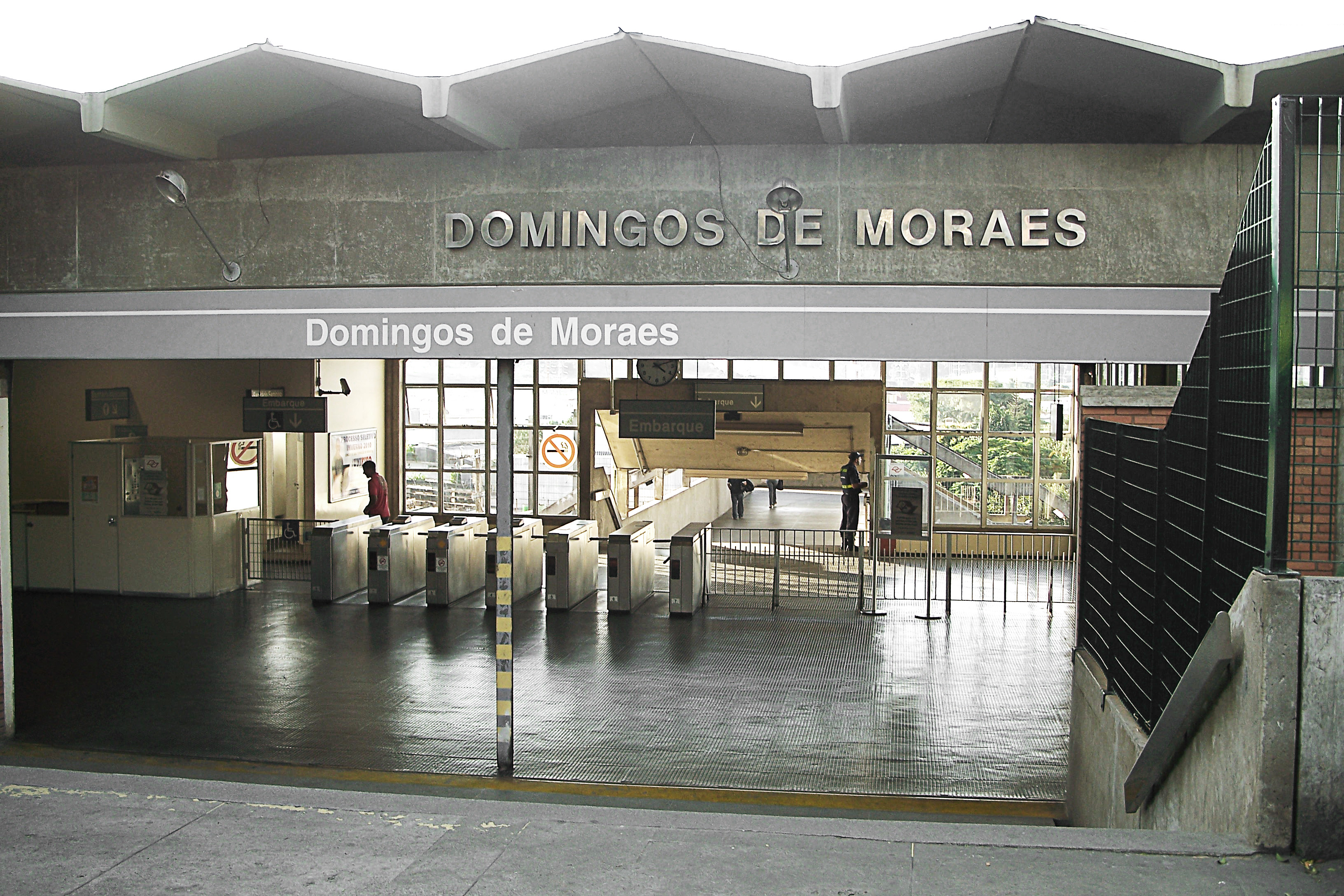
- Entrance of the station

General information
- Location: R. João Tibiriça, s/n Lapa; Brazil
- Owner: Government of the State of São Paulo
- Operator: ViaMobilidade Linhas 8 e 9 (Motiva)
- Platforms: Island platform

Construction
- Structure type: At-grade

Other information
- Station code: DMO

History
- Opened: 1 March 1931; 95 years ago
- Rebuilt: 25 January 1979; 47 years ago (reformed); 13 May 2014; 12 years ago (reopened)
- Former names: Posto Telegráfico Km 9,221

Services
Preceding station	São Paulo Metropolitan Trains	Following station
Imperatriz Leopoldina towards Amador Bueno	Line 8	Lapa towards Júlio Prestes
Track layout
Location

Domingos de Moraes is a train station on ViaMobilidade Linhas 8 e 9 Line 8-Diamond, located in the district of Lapa in São Paulo.

There are future plans for it to be connected with a new CPTM line, yet with no color or number defined, which will connect Piqueri with Monte Belo station, in Butantã.

== History ==
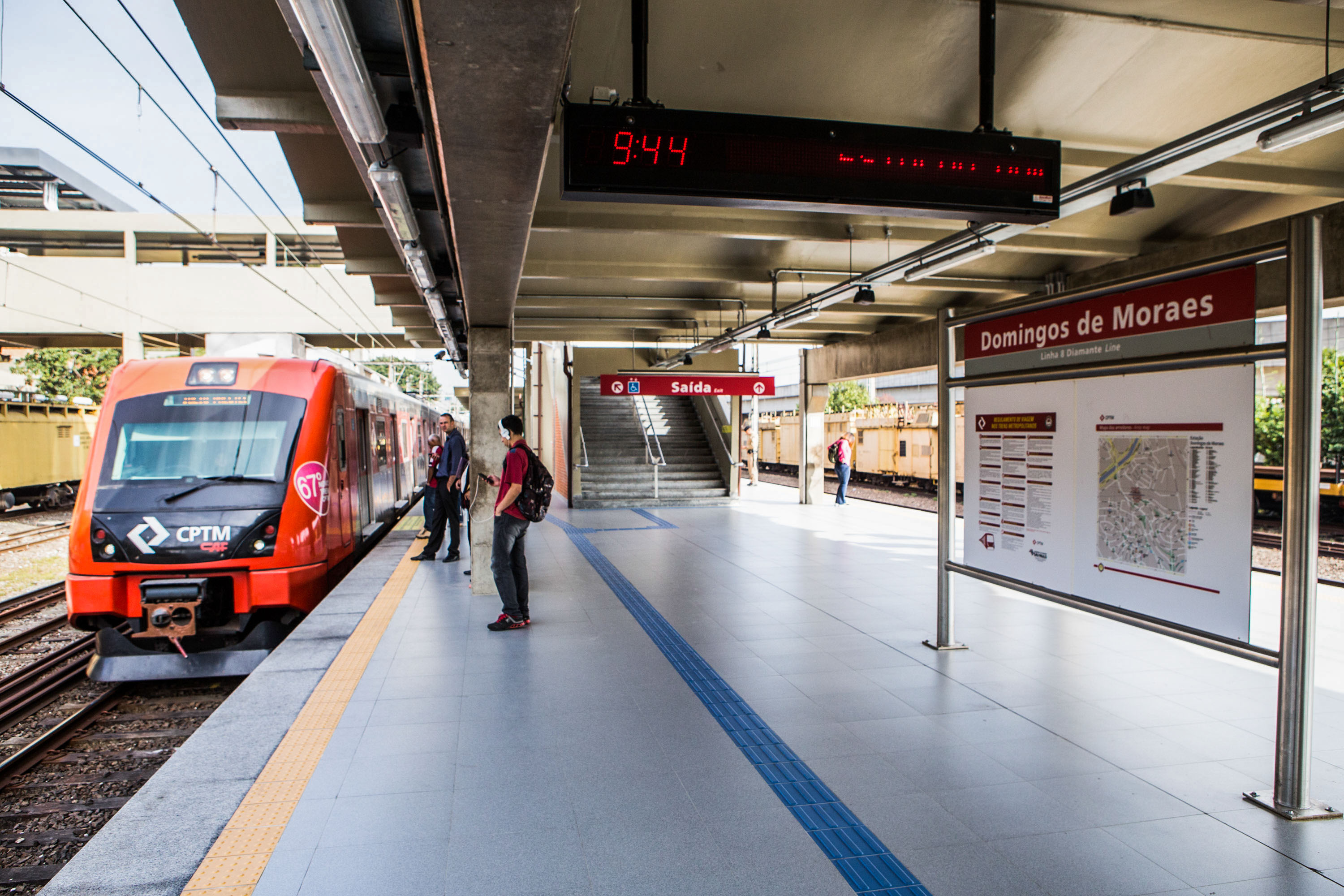
Platform of the station

The station was opened in 1920, named Posto Telegráfico Km 9,221. In 1921, it was renamed to Domingos de Moraes as a tribute to the Brazilian politician, who was Vice President (now Vice Governor) of São Paulo in 1902. The telegraph post receive a new building in 1926 and was promoted to station on 1 March 1931.

During the remodeling of the FEPASA West Line (current CPTM Line 8-Diamond), in the end of the 1970s, received another new building, opened on 9 August 1978. FEPASA had promised many news for the station, such as cafeterias, newsstands, public phones and restrooms, but none of them was made. Actually, the station was reopened without lighting in the platforms and ticket gates, the ticket offices were working in an improvised location with wood fences, and there was a great gap in the platforms, projected to receive the French trains, which started operating in 1979.

The new building, made with concrete molds, occupied a 4,000 square metres (43,000 sq ft) area and could receive an average of 26,000 passengers per day in its platforms of 245 metres (804 ft) of extension. To contain the income evasion, FEPASA also predicted to build concrete walls through all the line extension, with 10 centimetres (3.9 in) gaps between each block, where flower gardens would be made.

Since 1996, it belongs to CPTM. Besides the name of the politician is currently spelled "Domingos de Morais", the company preferred to keep the original spelling as "Moraes".

In 2014, the station was modernized. Among the improvements, there were accessibility works, which include elevators to access the platforms, new visual communication - with Braille options -, customer service room in the platform and common and adapted public restrooms.
