= Imperatriz Leopoldina (CPTM) =

Railway station in São Paulo, Brazil

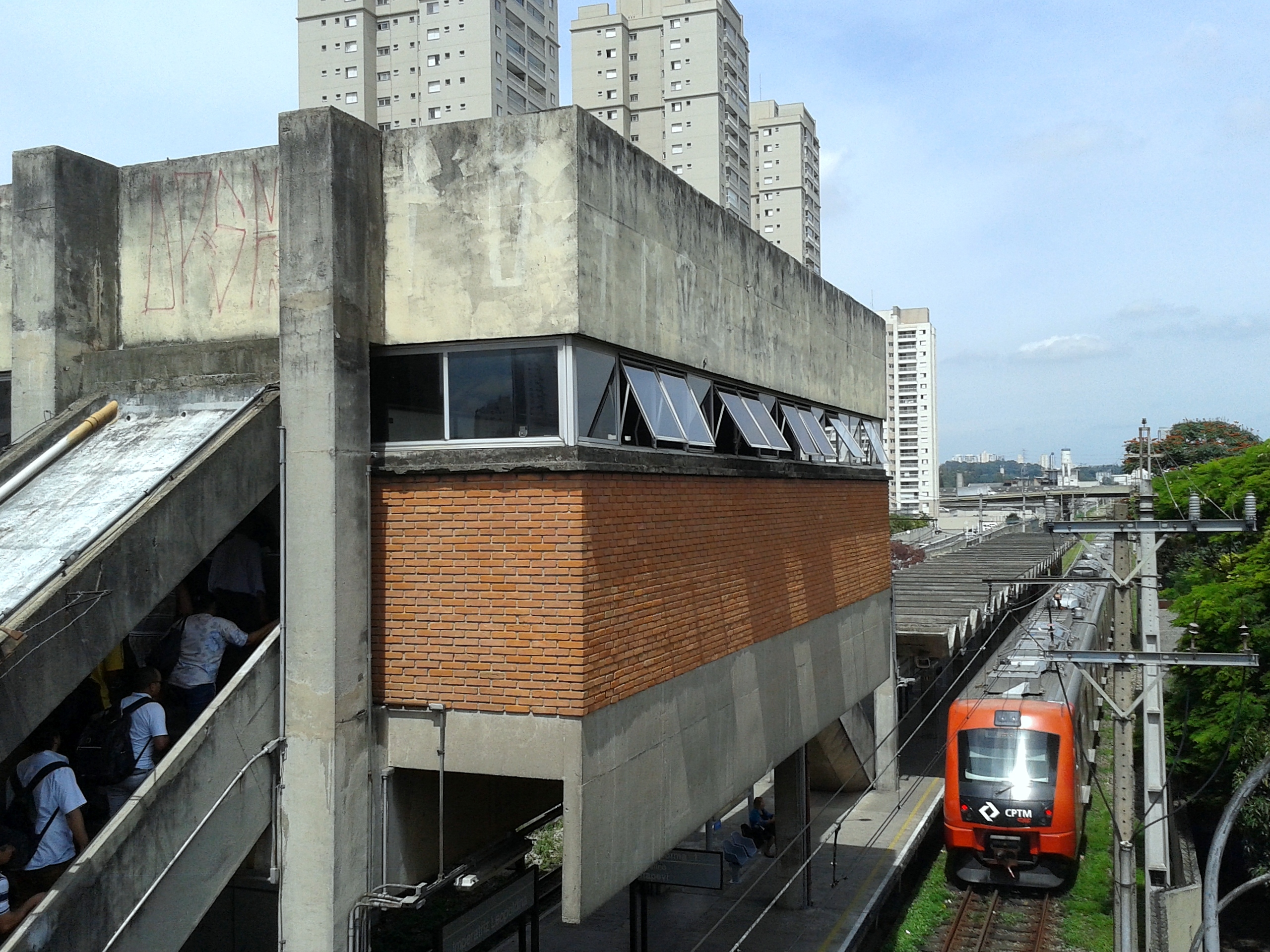
- Imperatriz Leopoldina Station in 2017

General information
- Location: Av. Imperatriz Leopoldina, 20; Vila Leopoldina; Brazil
- Coordinates: 23.523779°S 46.737462°W
- Owner: Government of the State of São Paulo
- Operator: ViaMobilidade Linhas 8 e 9 (Motiva)
- Platforms: Island platform

Construction
- Structure type: At-grade

Other information
- Station code: ILE

History
- Opened: 25 January 1957; 69 years ago
- Rebuilt: 25 January 1979; 47 years ago
- Former names: Armazém Regulador; Km 11

Services
Preceding station	São Paulo Metropolitan Trains	Following station
Presidente Altino towards Amador Bueno	Line 8	Domingos de Moraes towards Júlio Prestes
Track layout
Location

Imperatriz Leopoldina is a train station on ViaMobilidade Linhas 8 e 9 Line 8-Diamond, located in the district of Vila Leopoldina in São Paulo.

== History ==
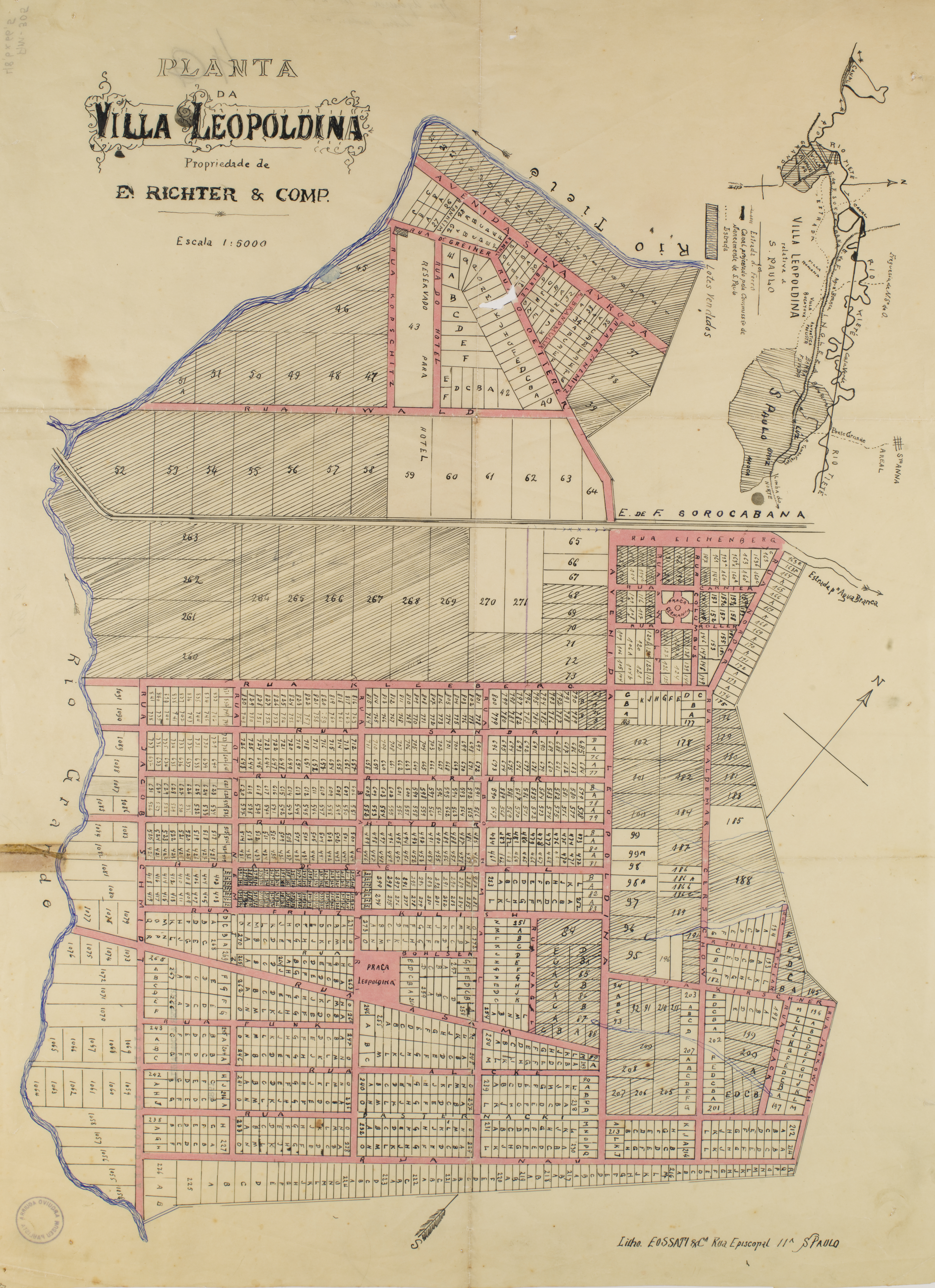
Map of the area of the district of Vila Leopoldina in 1894, by E. Richter e Cia. To the right, the area of the (future) Regulator Warehouse is identified as belonging to Estrada de Ferro Sorocabana.

Besides the railway crosses the region west to district of Lapa, which was created in 1894 with the name of Vila Leopoldina, not any station, stop, or derivative installation was built until 1925, when the recent founded São Paulo Coffee Institute built a Coffee Regulator Warehouse next to Km 11 of the main Estrada de Ferro Sorocabana track, in an area given by the company. Next to the warehouse, a small traffic control checkpoint was built, as some commuter trains stopped there occasionally, besides the Km 11 post wasn't a station.

On 12 October 1926, a misplaced track switch key made a N2 night train (with 11 cars), going from the countryside to São Paulo terminal, to enter a detour in the Regulator Warehouse and crash with a coffee cargo train. The accident left 3 dead and 38 injured. The railway traffic head, Luís Orsini, attributed the accident to a failure in the switch keys.

In 1937, the warehouse was bought by Sorocabana and worked until mid-1960s, when part of it was transferred to the General Warehouses Company of the State of São Paulo (CAGESP) and another part was given back to ICESP, being renamed Regulator Warehouse No. 27, with 16,913 square metres (182,050 sq ft). In 1969, the warehouse was returned to CESP, which demolishes it, rebuilding in its place two warehouses with a total area of 29,716 square metres (319,860 sq ft), and its rail branches were deactivated.

With the construction of Jurubatuba Branch (current CPTM Line 9-Emerald) in 1957, it was, for a time, the initial station of the branch. Besides the passengers movement growth boarding and leaving in the post of Km 11, it was promoted to the category of a stop, renamed Imperatriz Leopoldina. Until 1962, the station access had precarious pavimentation, obligating the prefecture to fix it in that year. After a commuter riot, angry with a failure, the stop was destroyed and Sorocabana was obligated to improve its installations, being reopened in 1966. In 1977, a bidding for the FEPASA stations remodeling was published, and Imperatriz Leopoldina was promoted to the category of station, being reopened on 25 January 1979.

=== Projects ===
When projected by the consortium Engevix/Sofrerail in 1973, the building of Imperatriz Leopoldina station aimed to attend the demand of a region with industrial zone. In the 1990s, many industries left Vila Leopoldina and its hangars were demolished and replaced by residential condominiums. In 2004, CPTM hired a new project for the station, won by the companies EGT Engenharia Ltda. and Copen Engenharia Ltda, by the cost of R$ 567,693.00 (US$ 339,361.1). In June 2007, the project was presented in public audiences, almost reaching the deadline for the beginning of the construction, but it never began.
