= Ambuitá (CPTM) =

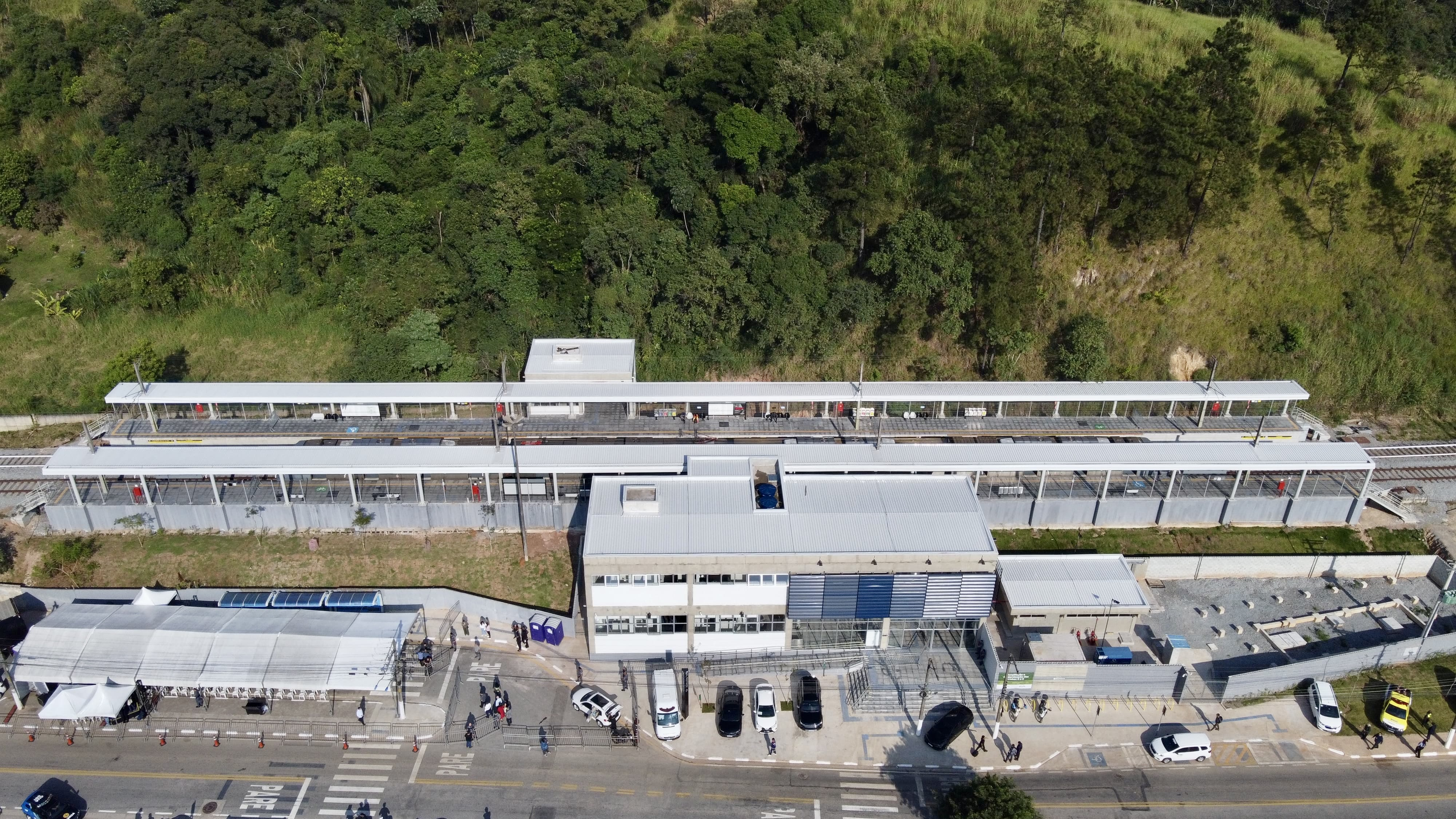

General information
- Location: Rua Dr. José Alexandre Crosgnac, 110; Itapevi; Brazil
- Coordinates: 23.53°S 46.97°W
- Owner: Government of the State of São Paulo
- Operator: ViaMobilidade (Motiva)
- Platforms: Side platforms

Construction
- Structure type: At-grade

Other information
- Station code: AMB

History
- Opened: 19 September 1949
- Closed: 30 April 2010
- Rebuilt: 4 April 2025
- Former names: Iracema
- Original company: CPTM (1996–2010)

Services
Preceding station	São Paulo Metropolitan Trains	Following station
Amador Bueno Terminus	Line 8	Santa Rita towards Júlio Prestes
Track layout
Location

Ambuitá is a train station on the Line 8-Diamond operational extension, formerly operated by CPTM, located in the municipality of Itapevi.

It was rebuilt as a counterpart of the concession of Lines 8 and 9 to ViaMobilidade. Construction works began in January 2024 and the station was reopened in April 2025.

== History ==
Opened by Estrada de Ferro Sorocabana as Iracema Stop on 19 September 1949, it was renamed to Ambuitá in 1952. During the train systems modernization made by Ferrovia Paulista S/A during the 1970s and 80s, the stop got new facilities on 21 June 1985. In 1997, its ticket office was closed by CPTM due to constant robberies. After the Line 8 division, the stop became part of the Itapevi–Amador Bueno operational extension. In 2010, the stop was closed and fully demolished during the modernization works made by governor José Serra and its reconstruction was estimated to 2013, during Geraldo Alckmin administration. The reconstruction works never began and, in April 2014, five months before the state elections, governor Alckmin went to Amador Bueno for the reopening of the operational extension. In this occasion, it was announced that Ambuitá Stop was the current Line 8 priority. Even after his re-election, the Alckmin administration never began the construction works, which garnered protests made by part of the local population.

In January 2020, governor João Doria announced that Ambuitá station will be rebuilt with accessibility resources by the winning company of Line 8 concession plan, whose bidding would be published in December, confirming his statement. With the announcement, the surroundings revitalization works, such as asphalting of the main roads, were intensified by Itapevi prefecture. The municipal administration also tried to include in the partnership Cimenrita station, absent from the notice draft, unsuccessfully.

== See also ==
- Itapevi
- Line 8 (CPTM)
