= Line 8 (CPTM) =

Commuter rail line in São Paulo

Line 8 (Diamond)

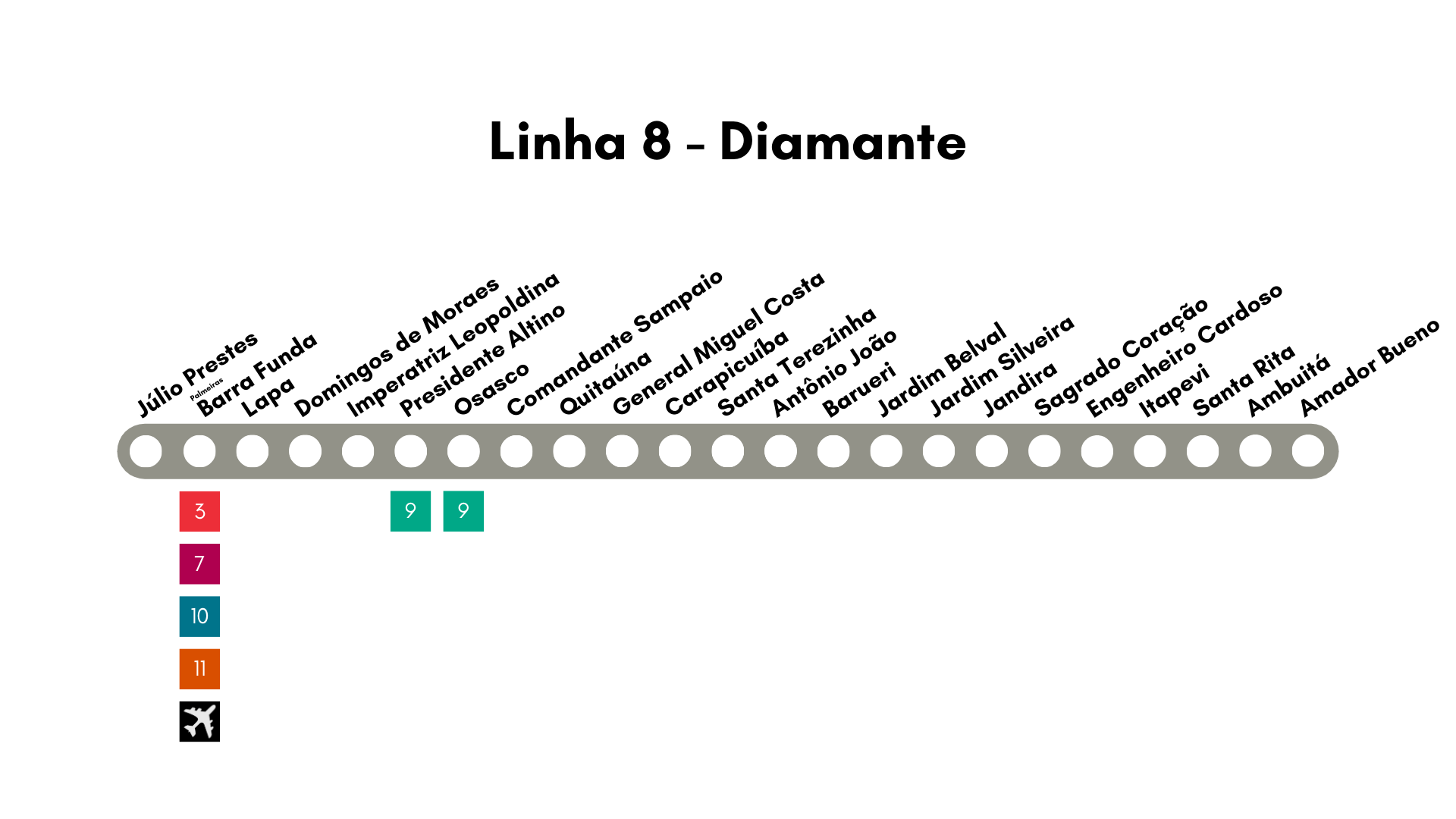

Overview
- Status: Operational
- Owner: Government of the State of São Paulo
- Locale: Greater São Paulo, Brazil
- Termini: Amador Bueno; Júlio Prestes
- Connecting lines: Current: Planned: 20
- Stations: 23 in operation 1 in project

Service
- Type: Commuter rail
- System: São Paulo Metropolitan Trains
- Operator: ViaMobilidade Linhas 8 e 9 (Motiva)
- Depots: Lapa rail yard; Presidente Altino rail yard; Santa Terezinha rail yard
- Rolling stock: 24 Francorail/CCTU/MTE/Cobrasma Series 5400 (6 trains, operational extension); 152 CAF 7000 Series (19 trains); 64 CAF 7500 Series (8 trains); 224 Alstom 8900 Series (32 trains)

History
- Opened: 10 July 1875; 150 years ago

Technical
- Line length: 42 km (26 mi)
- Character: At-grade
- Track gauge: 1,600 mm (5 ft 3 in)
- Electrification: Overhead line, 3,000 V DC
- Operating speed: 80 km/h (50 mph)
- Signalling: Automatic block signaling

Line 8 (Diamond) (Portuguese: Linha 8–Diamante), formerly Line B (Gray), is one of the thirteen lines that make up the São Paulo Metro Rail Transport Network in Brazil and one of the three lines operated by ViaMobilidade Linhas 8 e 9. The line was previously operated by Fepasa, and subsequently by CPTM. Since 27 January 2022, ViaMobilidade Linhas 8 e 9 has been operating it under a contract for 30 years, along with Line 9-Emerald.

== Stations ==
Station	Code	Platforms	Position	Connections	City
Júlio Prestes	JPR	Island and side platforms	At-grade	-	São Paulo
Palmeiras-Barra Funda	BFU	Island platforms	At-grade	Barra Funda Bus Terminal; Barra Funda Road Terminal	São Paulo
Lapa	LAB	Side platforms	At-grade	Lapa Bus Terminal	São Paulo
Domingos de Moraes	DMO	Island platform	At-grade	-	São Paulo
Imperatriz Leopoldina	ILE	Island platform	At-grade	-	São Paulo
Presidente Altino	PAL	Island platforms	At-grade	ViaMobilidade Linhas 8 e 9 Line 9 (CPTM)	Osasco
Osasco	OSA	Island platforms	At-grade	Osasco Bus Terminal; Osasco Road Terminal	Osasco
Comandante Sampaio	CSA	Island platforms	At-grade	Itapevi–Butantã Metropolitan Corridor	Osasco
Quitaúna	QTU	Island platforms	At-grade	Itapevi–Butantã Metropolitan Corridor	Osasco
General Miguel Costa	GMC	Island platforms	At-grade	Luiz Bortolosso Metropolitan Terminal; Itapevi–Butantã Metropolitan Corridor	Osasco
Carapicuíba	CPB	Island platforms	At-grade	Carapicuíba Bus Terminal; Itapevi–Butantã Metropolitan Corridor	Carapicuíba
Santa Terezinha	STE	Island platform	At-grade	Itapevi–Butantã Metropolitan Corridor	Carapicuíba
Antônio João	AJO	Side platforms	At-grade	-	Barueri
Barueri	BRU	Island platforms	At-grade	Barueri Bus Terminal; Itapevi–Butantã Metropolitan Corridor	Barueri
Jardim Belval	JBE	Island platform	At-grade	Itapevi–Butantã Metropolitan Corridor	Barueri
Jardim Silveira	JSI	Island platform	At-grade	Jardim Silveira Bus Terminal; Itapevi–Butantã Metropolitan Corridor	Barueri
Jandira	JDI	Island platform	At-grade	Jandira Bus Terminal; Itapevi–Butantã Metropolitan Corridor	Jandira
Sagrado Coração	SCO	Island platform	At-grade	Itapevi–Butantã Metropolitan Corridor	Jandira
Engenheiro Cardoso	ECD	Island platform	At-grade	Itapevi–Butantã Metropolitan Corridor	Itapevi
Itapevi	IPV	Island platform	At-grade	(Amador Bueno Extension); Itapevi–Butantã Metropolitan Corridor	Itapevi

=== Amador Bueno Extension ===
Station	Code	Platforms	Position	Connections	City
Itapevi	IPV	Island platforms	At-grade	(Main line); Itapevi–Butantã Metropolitan Corridor	Itapevi
Santa Rita	SRT	Island platform	At-grade	-	Itapevi
Ambuitá	AMB	Side platforms	At-grade	-	Itapevi
Amador Bueno	ABU	Island platform	At-grade	-	Itapevi

== Mairinque Extension ==
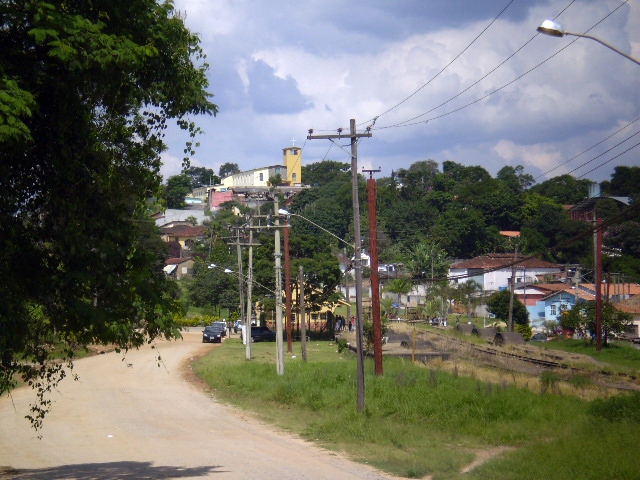
With the abandonment of the stretch by CPTM, the electric network was looted. View of the railroad near the São João Novo station.

Since the establishment of suburban trains in the late 1920s, their services have connected São Paulo to the city of Mairinque. With the creation of Fepasa in 1971, the suburban section was transferred to the Regional Suburbs Unit. This regional unit was expanded in the 1970s and transformed into a Metropolitan Regional Division (DRM).

In the 1980s, the service underwent some renovations, with the introduction of the Toshiba trains renovated in Rio Claro and the construction or renovation of the existing stops between Mairinque and Amador Bueno, equipped only with shelters and "humps" for easy boarding of passengers. The service was officially known as "Trem de Mairinque" and nicknamed "Mairinquinho". In 1987, the city of São Roque even considered an agreement with Fepasa for the integration of trains with the bus network of the then public company SanTC (São-Roquense de Transportes Colectivos), but the proposal did not move forward.

Station	Municipality	Status	Comments
Amador Bueno	Itapevi	Operating	Station reconstructed
Parada 46	São Roque	Deactivated since 1999	Simple stop
São João Novo	São Roque	Deactivated since 1999	
Parada 50	São Roque	Deactivated since 1999	Simple stop
Mailasqui	São Roque	Deactivated since 1999	
Cinzano	São Roque	Deactivated since 1999	Simple stop
Gabriel Piza	São Roque	Deactivated since 1999	Demolished by looters in 2010.
Vila Amaral	São Roque	Deactivated since 1999	Simple stop
São Roque	São Roque	Deactivated since 1999	Current headquarters of the local Municipal Guard.
Marmeleiro	São Roque	Deactivated since 1999	Simple stop
Mairinque	Mairinque	Deactivated since 1999	Current cultural center.

== See also ==
- São Paulo Metropolitan Trains
