= Jandira =

- Flag Coat of arms

- Location of Jandira

- Location within Brazil
- Coordinates: 23°31′40″S 46°54′10″W
- Country: Brazil
- Region: Southeast
- State: São Paulo

Government
  - Mayor: Henri Hajime Sato (PSD)

Area
  - Total: 17.45 km^{2} (6.74 sq mi)
- Elevation: 720 m (2,360 ft)

Population (2022 Census)
  - Total: 118,045
  - Estimate (2025): 121,550
  - Density: 6,765/km^{2} (17,520/sq mi)
- Time zone: UTC−3 (BRT)
- HDI (2000): 0,801 high
- Website: https://www.jandira.sp.gov.br

Jandira is a municipality in the state of São Paulo in Brazil. It is part of the Metropolitan Region of São Paulo. The population is 118,045 (2022 Census) in an area of 17.45 km^{2}. The suburban city is served by the ViaMobilidade with line 8.

== Demography ==
Historical population (municipality)
Year	Population	%±
1970	12,499	—
1980	36,043	188.4%
1991	62,697	74.0%
2000	91,807	46.4%
2010	108,344	18.0%
2022	118,045	9.0%

== Media ==
In telecommunications, the city was served by Companhia Telefônica Brasileira until 1973, when it began to be served by Telecomunicações de São Paulo. In July 1998, this company was acquired by Telefónica, which adopted the Vivo brand in 2012.

The company is currently an operator of cell phones, fixed lines, internet (fiber optics/4G) and television (satellite and cable).

== Religion ==
Christianity is present in the city as follows:

=== Catholic Church ===
The Catholic church in the municipality is part of the Diocese of Osasco.

=== Protestant Church ===
The most diverse evangelical beliefs are present in the city, mainly Pentecostal, including the Assemblies of God in Brazil (the largest evangelical church in the country), Christian Congregation in Brazil, among others. These denominations are growing more and more throughout Brazil.

== See also ==
- List of municipalities in São Paulo
