= Itapevi–Butantã Metropolitan Corridor =

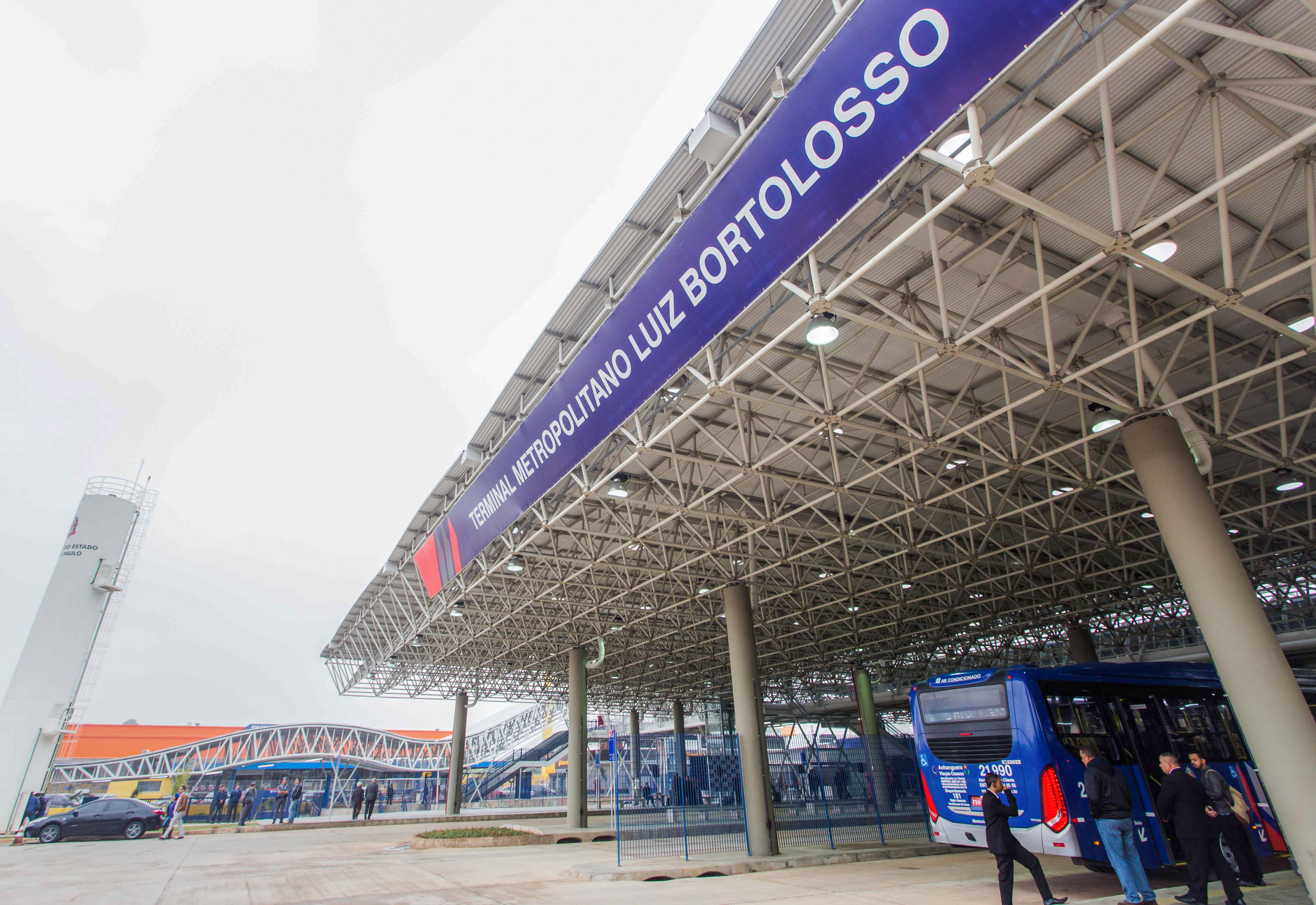
- Luiz Bortolosso Metropolitan Terminal, part of the São Paulo–Itapevi Bus Corridor

Overview
- Owner: EMTU
- Locale: São Paulo; Osasco; Carapicuíba; Barueri; Jandira; Itapevi
- Transit type: Bus rapid transit
- Number of stations: 42
- Website: www.metra.com.br

Operation
- Began operation: March 2018; 8 years ago
- Operator: Metra

Technical
- System length: 23.6 km (14.7 mi)
- Top speed: 50 km/h (31 mph)

Itapevi–São Paulo (Butantã) Metropolitan Corridor, with 33 km (21 mi) of extension, starts in Itapevi Bus Terminal, connected with CPTM Line 8-Diamond, in Itapevi, and goes to ViaQuatro Butantã station of Line 4-Yellow, in São Paulo. The project reaches the cities of Itapevi, Jandira, Barueri, Carapicuíba, Osasco and São Paulo which total approximately 13 million inhabitants.

In its first phase, the corridor with approximately 5 km (3.1 mi) connects Itapevi and Jandira, along with stations Itapevi, Engenheiro Cardoso, Sagrado Coração and Jandira.

== History ==
The region interconnected through Estrada Velha de Itu, used by tropeiros for trips between São Paulo, Carapicuíba Village, Santana de Parnaíba, Sorocaba and Itu. Throughout the 20th century, roads were built, as the old road towards Itu was replaced by a highway (current SP-312) on 1 May 1922. This road became (beside Sorocabana railway and future Castelo Branco and Raposo Tavares highways) one of the transport corridors that boosted the region growth, being one of the points of population densification that went there.

In 1934, the first regular bus lines began operating between Carapicuíba, Largo da Batata and Lapa, which became the main regional centres of West Side São Paulo. In the next 30 years, the cities of São Paulo, Santana de Paraíba and Cotia break up, creating new cities: Itapevi (1949), Barueri (1949), Osasco (1962), Carapicuíba (1964) and Jandira (1964).

Until then, the public transportation was controlled by the state through permissions, creating dozens of companies and small vehicle owners. This situation is changed in the 1970s with the creation of EMTU, which starts regulating the intermunicipal lines. In the same decade, the first modernization project of this transport corridor was made. The Prefecture of São Paulo suggests the installing of a trolleybus corridor between Largo da Batata and Osasco. Besides the construction was never initiated, EMTU keeps planning the corridor (now called West Road Corridor) through the 1980s and 1990s.

== Gallery ==
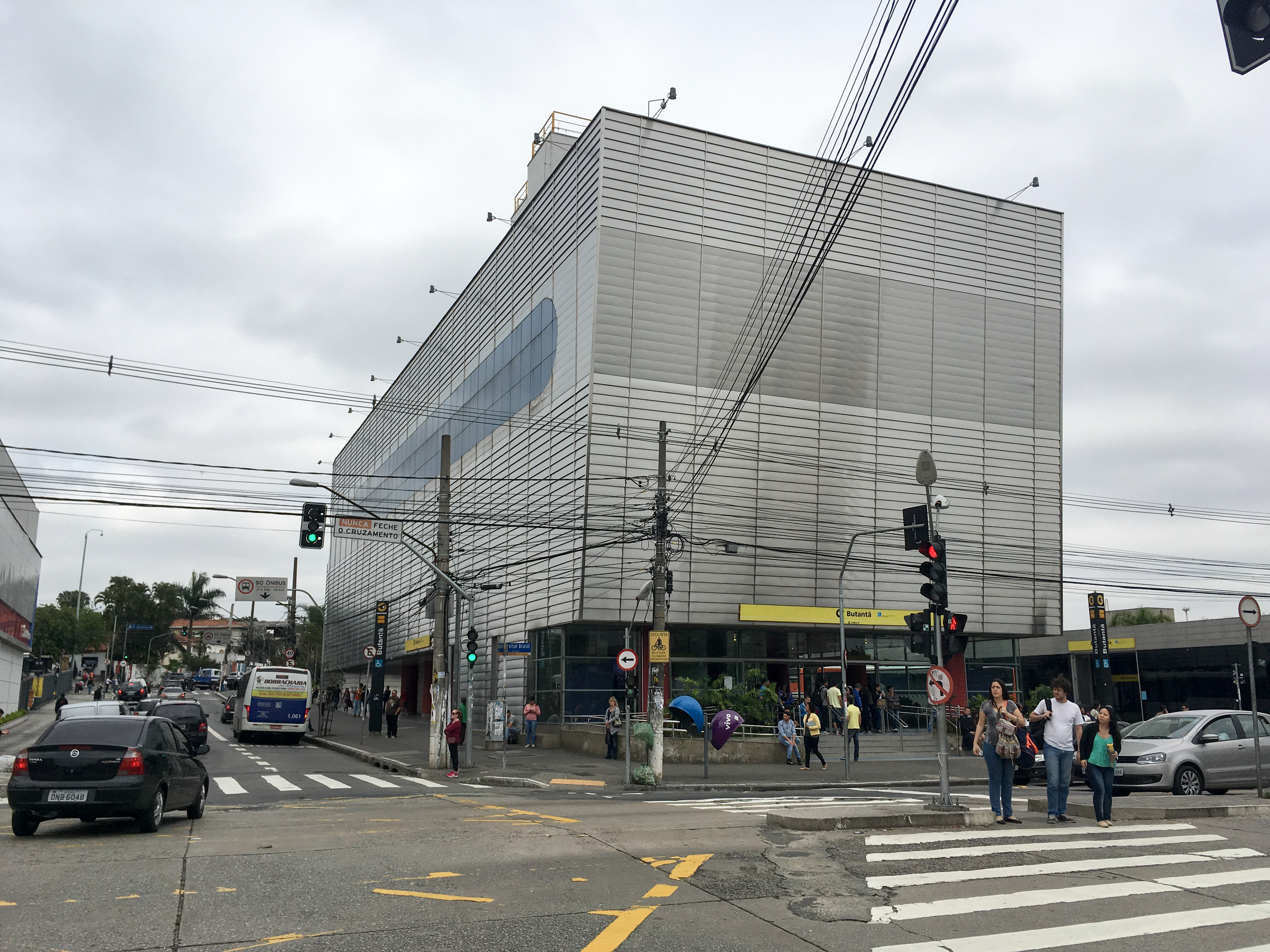
Butantã Terminal

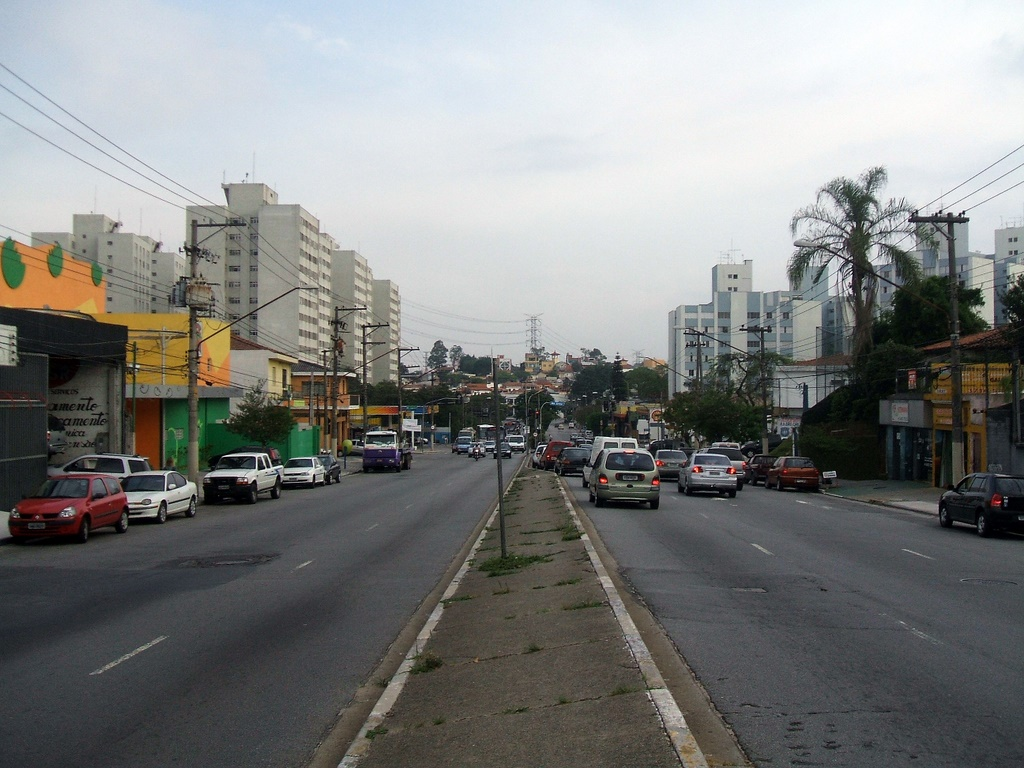
Avenida Corifeu de Azevedo Marques, São Paulo

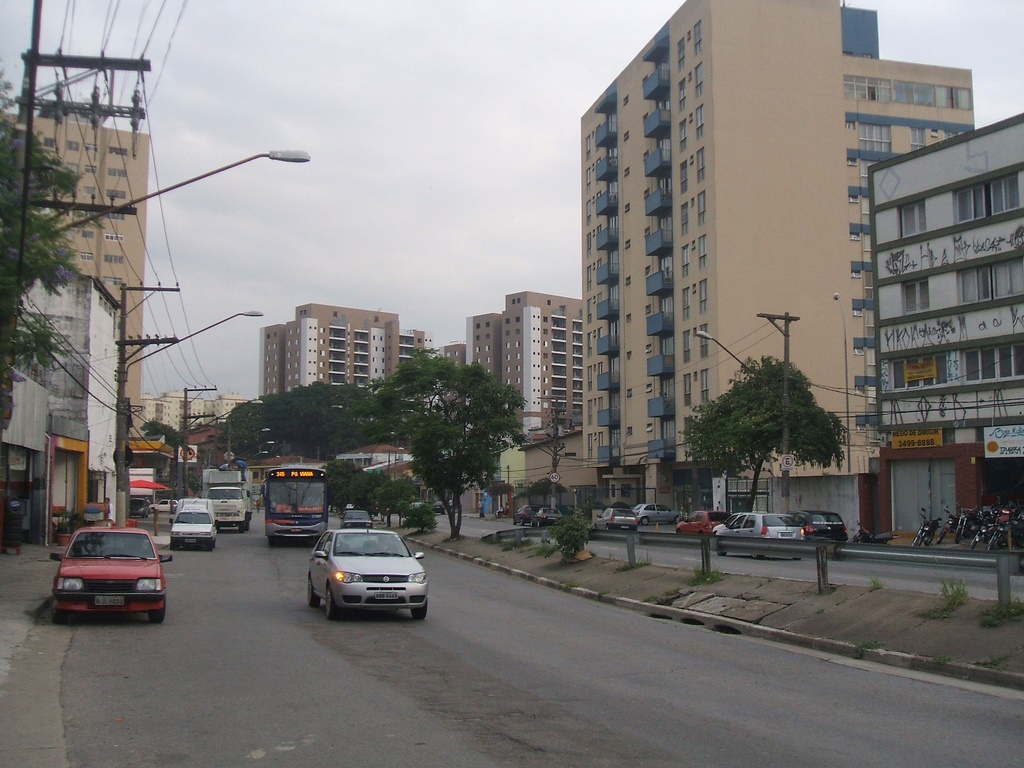
Barueri Intermunicipal Line in Avenida Corifeu

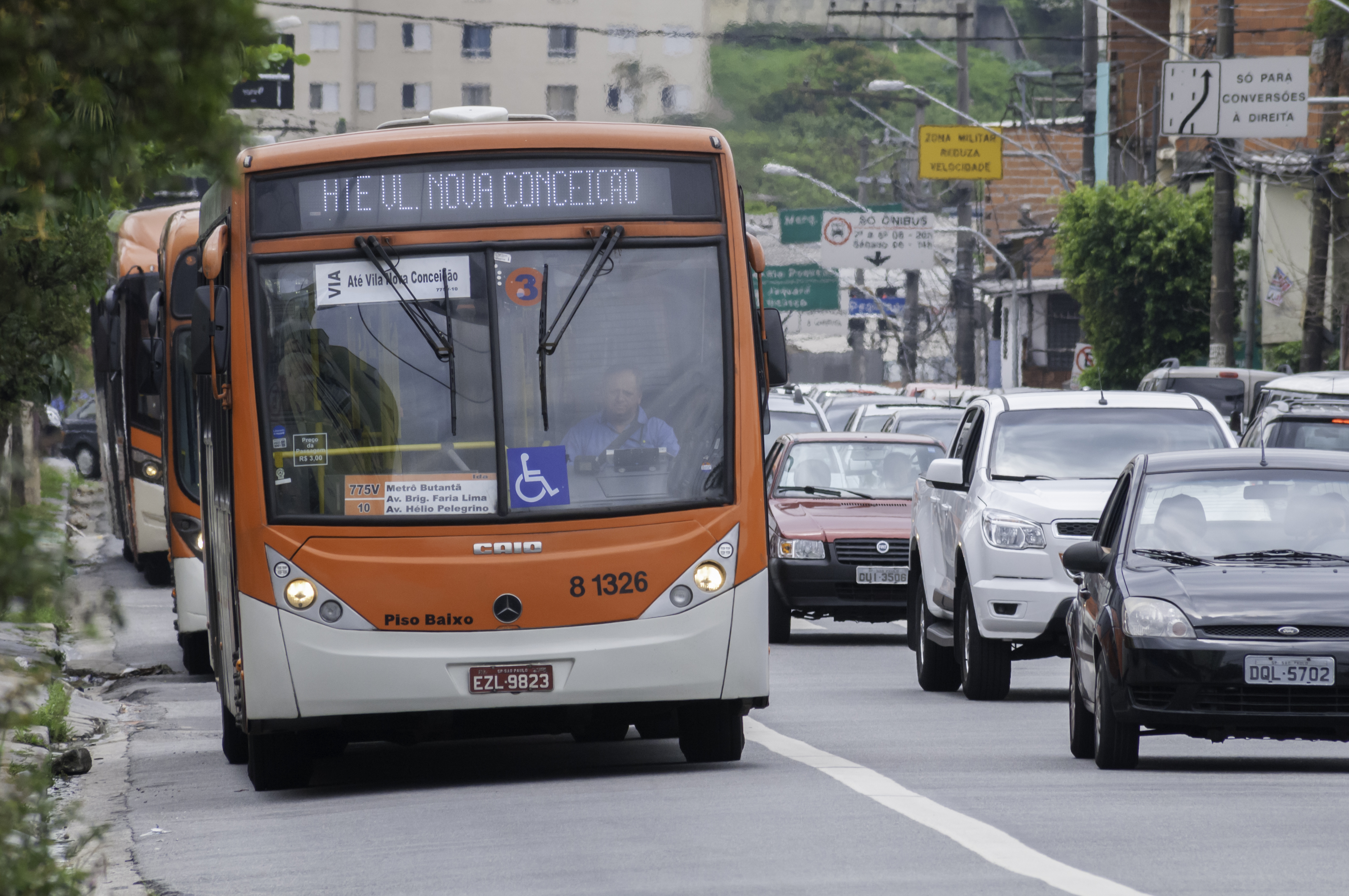
Municipal Line of São Paulo in Avenida Corifeu

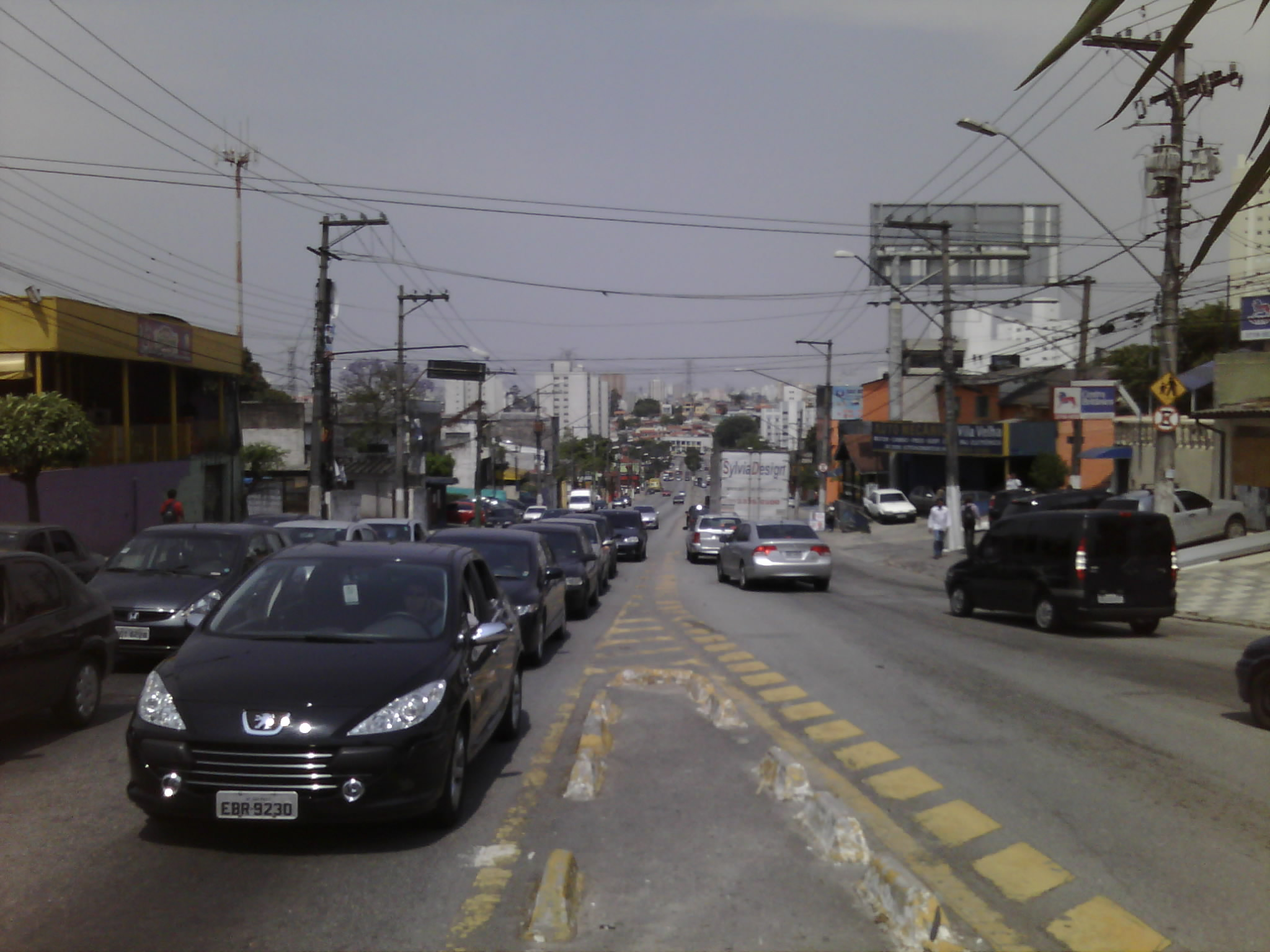
Border between São Paulo and Osasco

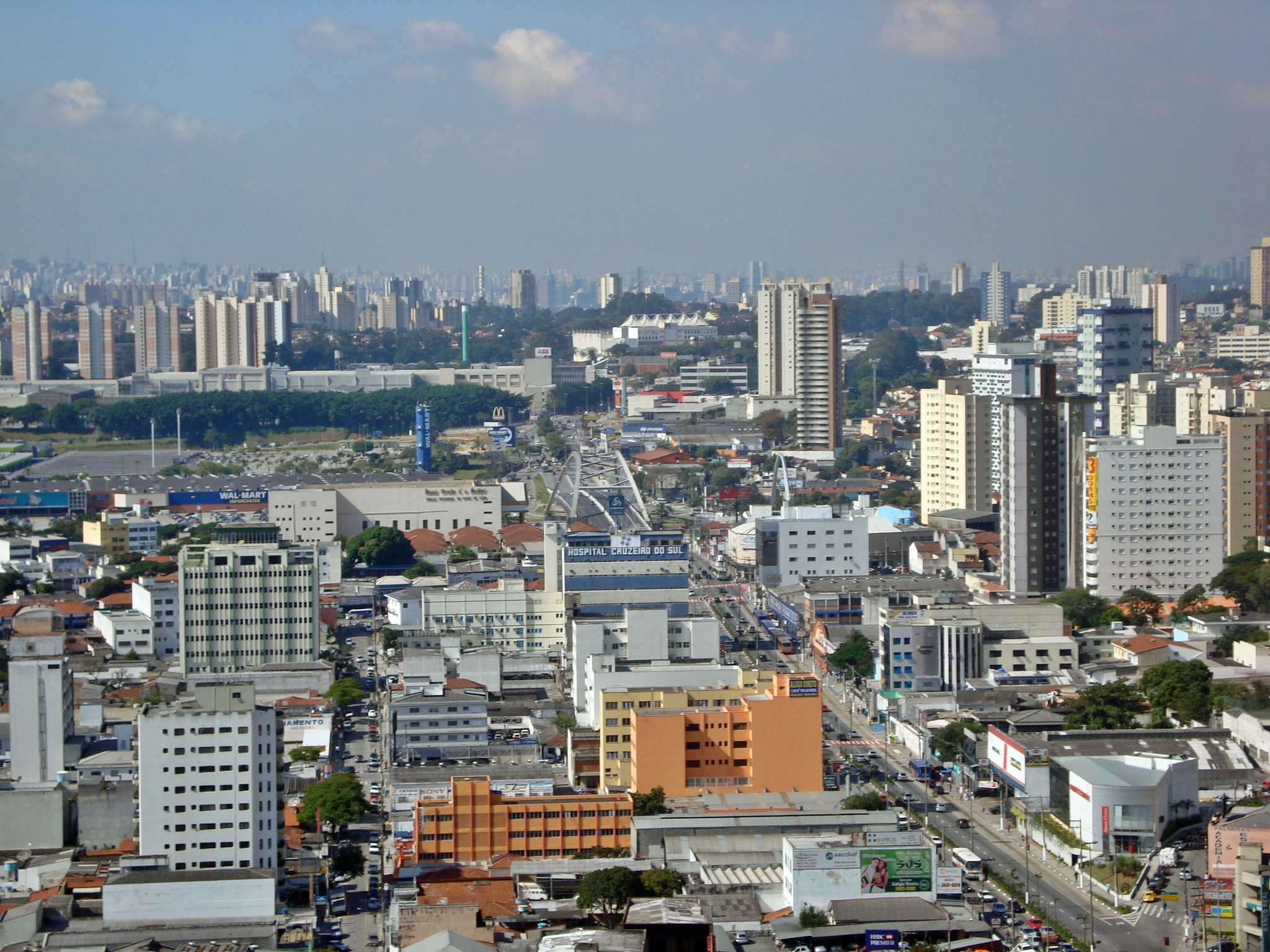
View of Avenida dos Autonomistas, Osasco, part of the corridor

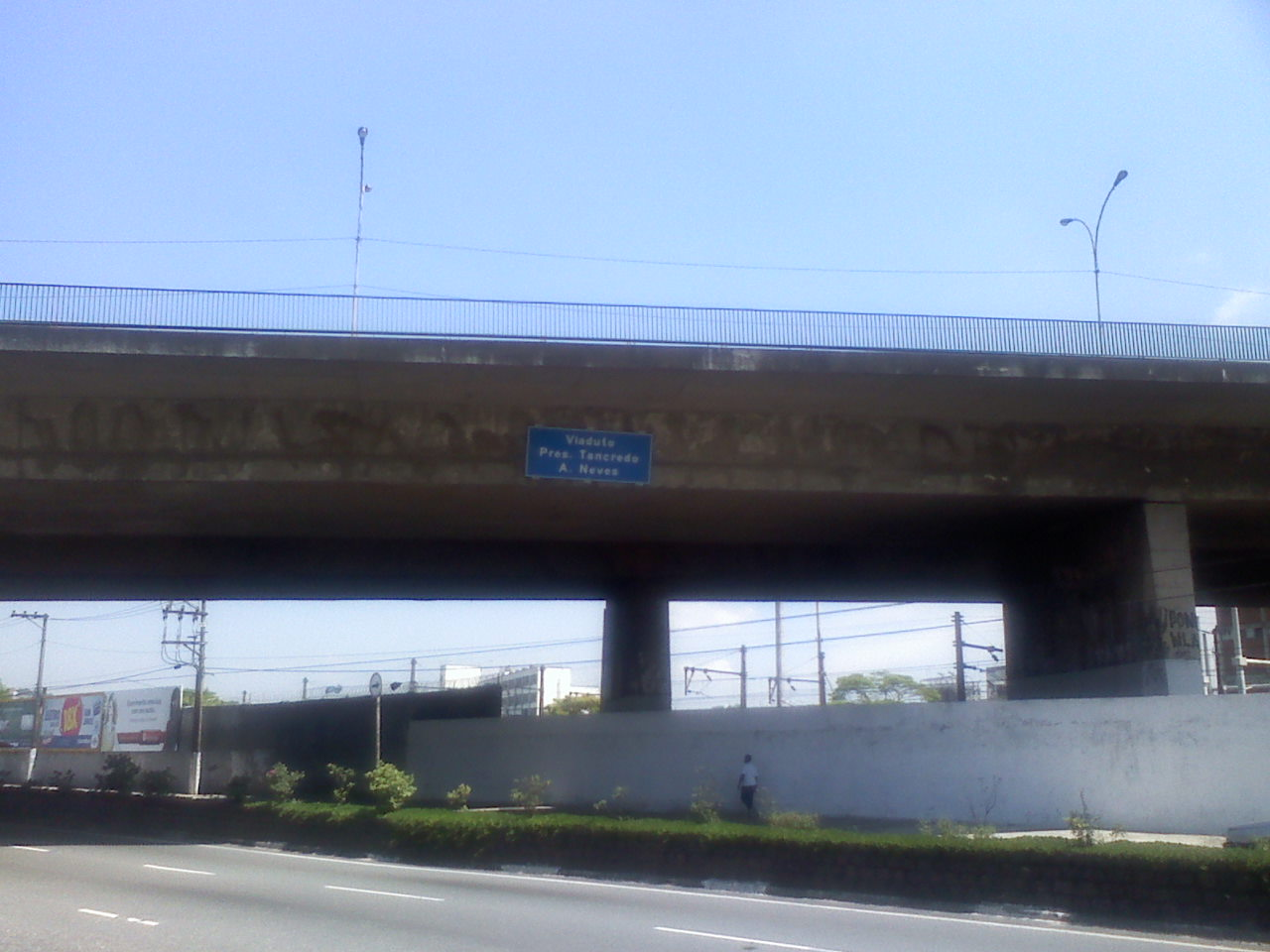
View of the corridor under Viaduto Tancredo Neves, Osasco

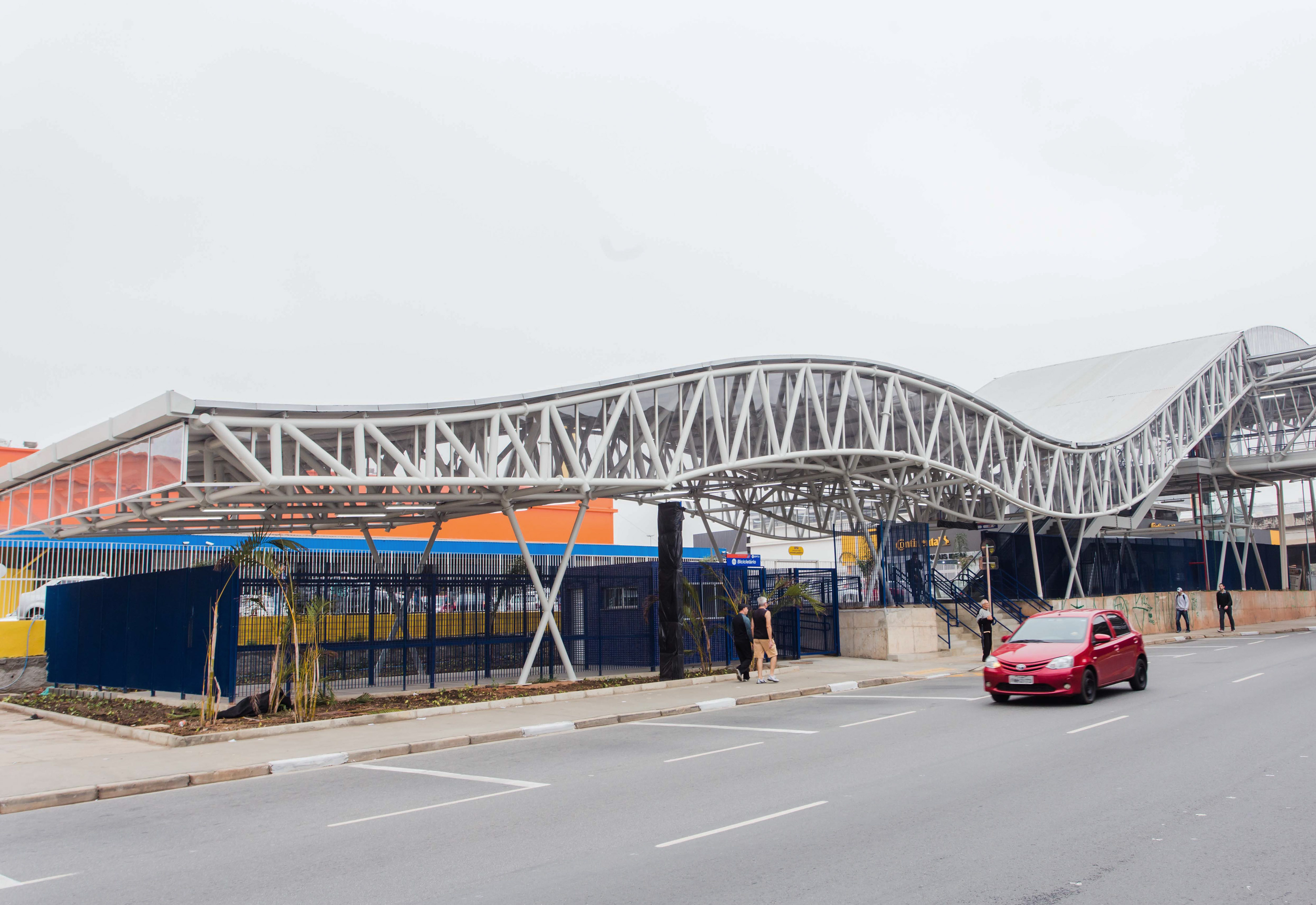
Access to Luiz Bortolosso Metropolitan Terminal in Avenida dos Autonomistas, in the border between Osasco and Carapicuíba

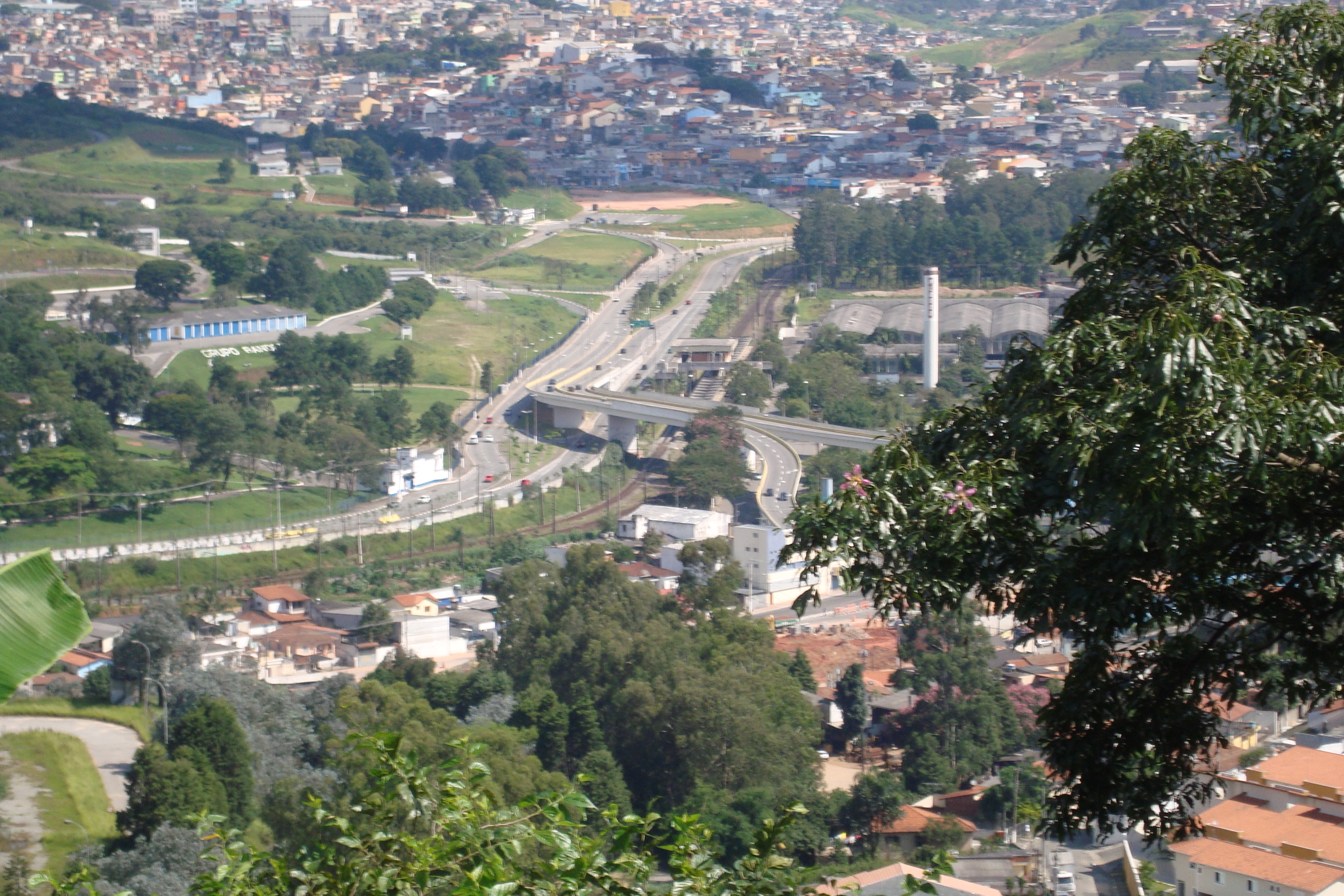
View of corridor in Jardim Belval, Barueri

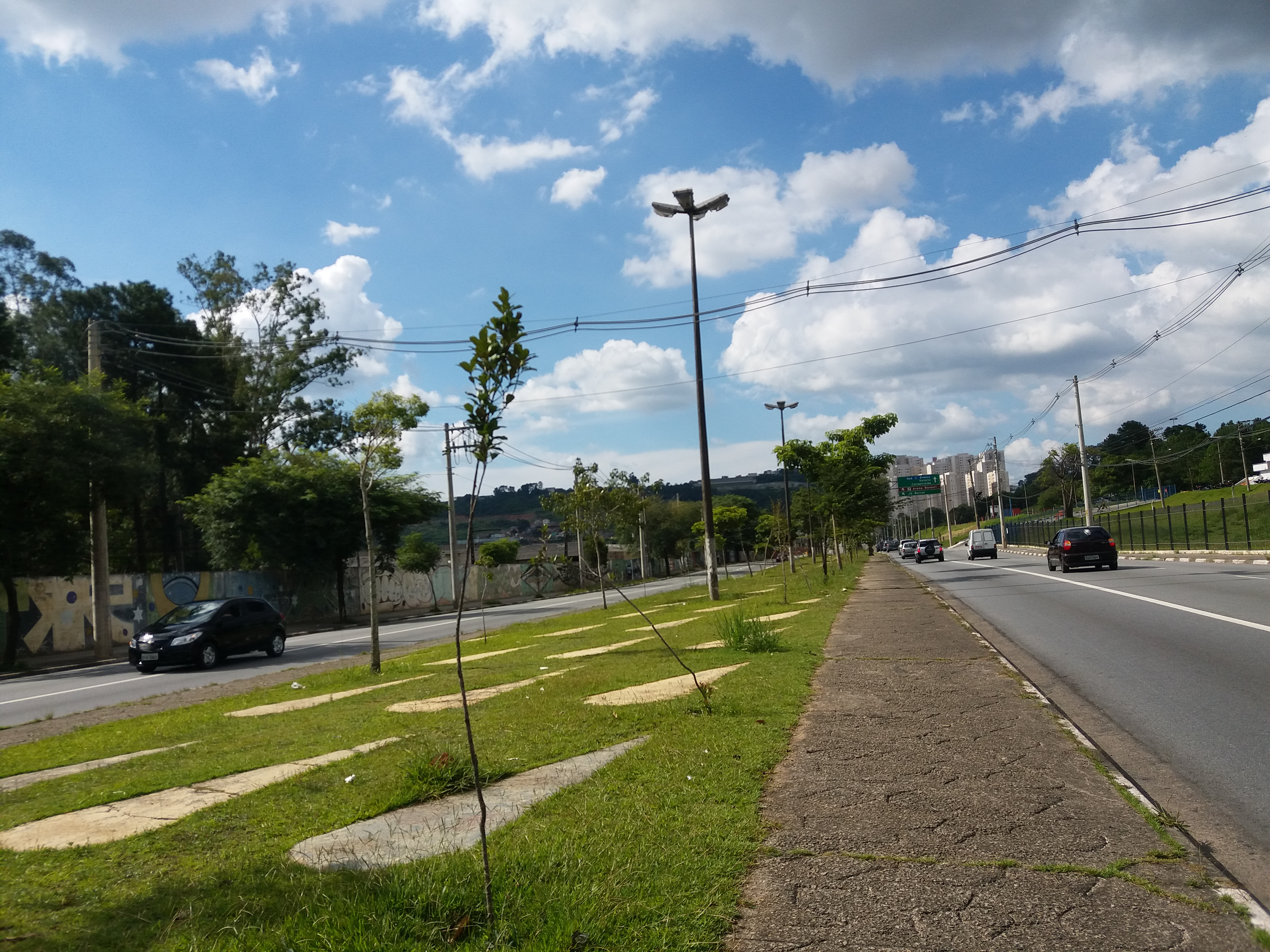
Aspect of the corridor in Barueri

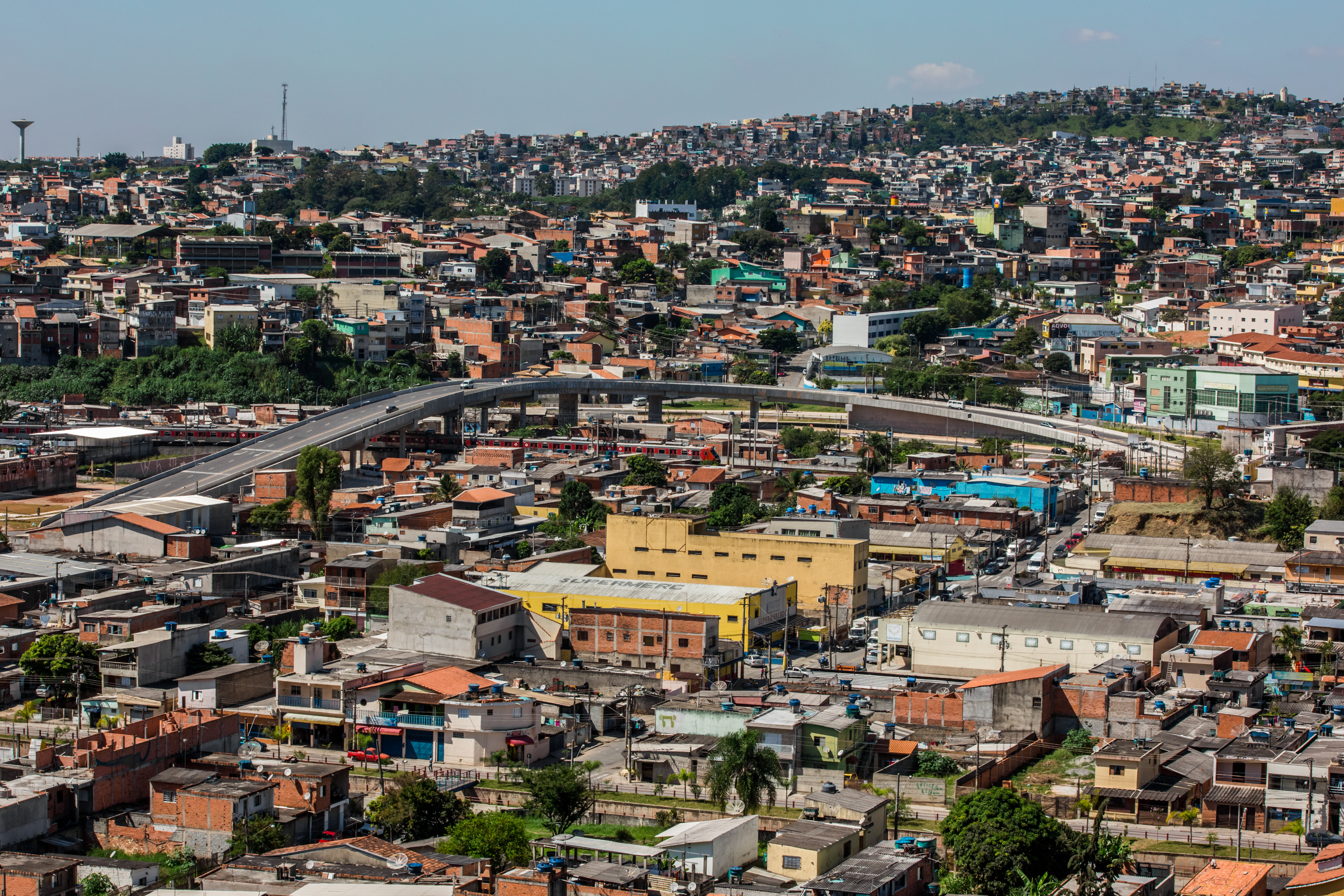
Viaduto Ameríndia, Itapevi, built as access to the corridor

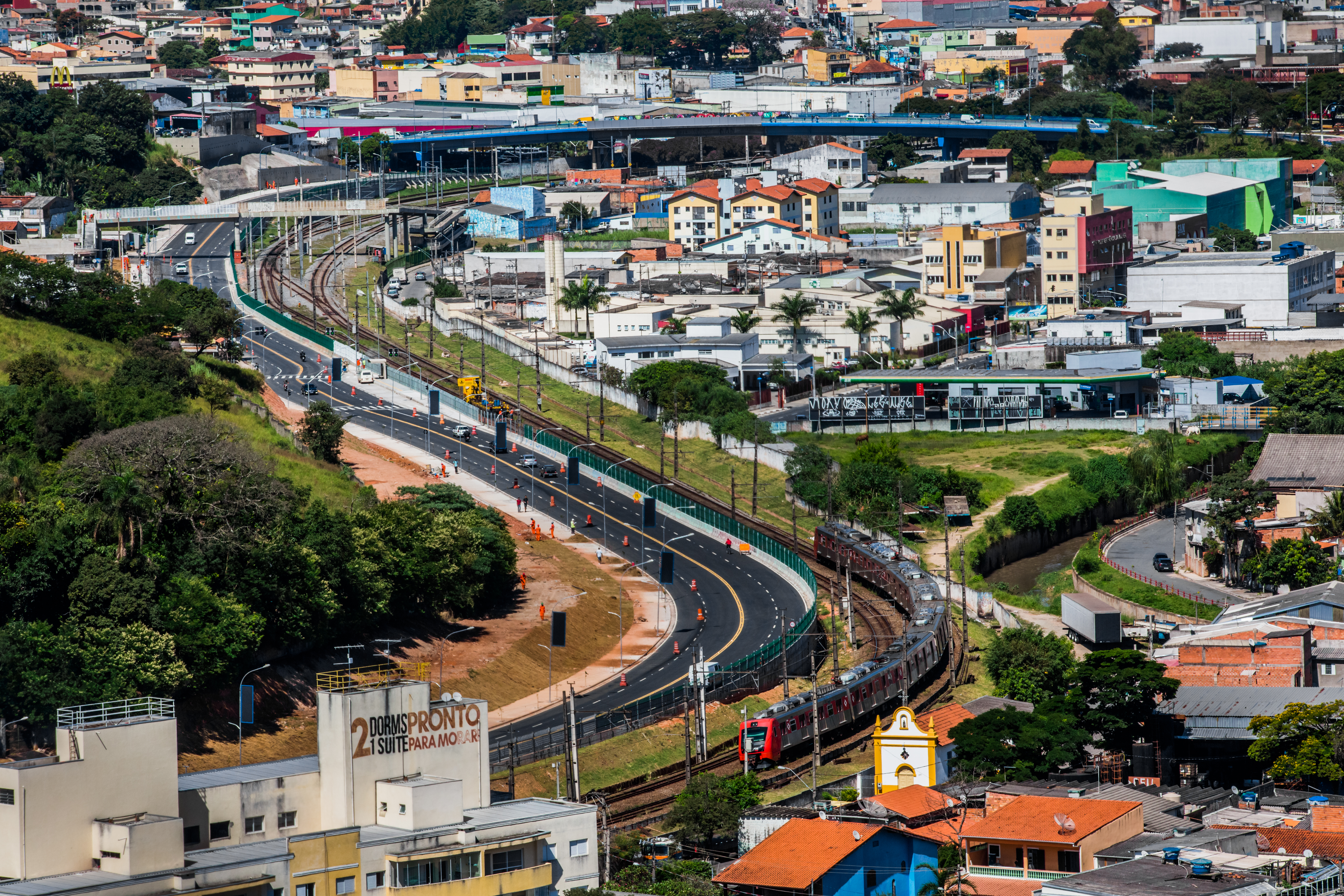
View of the new stretch of the corridor in Itapevi
