= Amador Bueno (CPTM) =

Railway station in São Paulo, Brazil

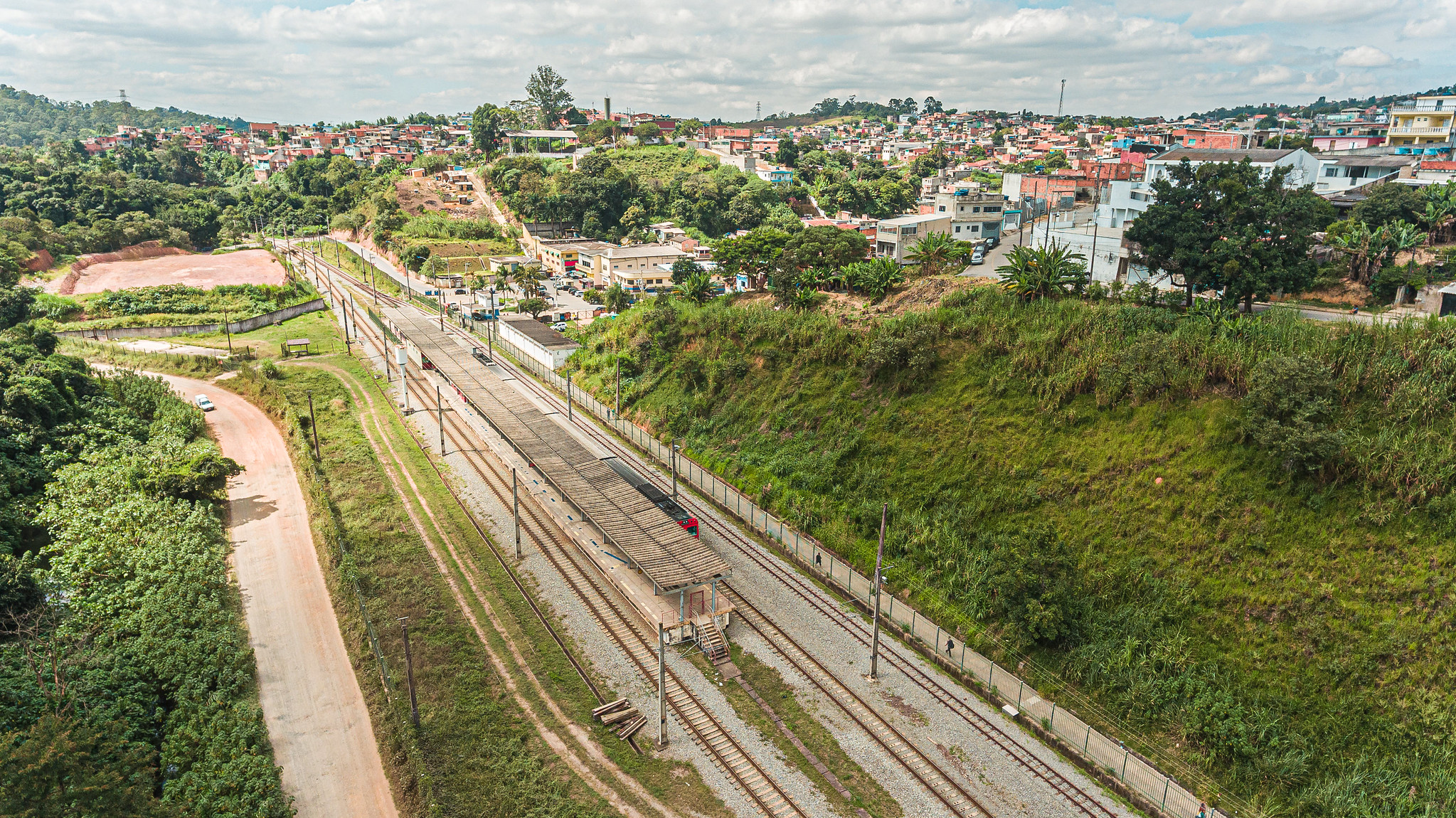

General information
- Location: Av. Bambina Chaluppe, s/nº Brazil
- Coordinates: 23.5305°S 46.9837°E
- Owner: Government of the State of São Paulo
- Operator: ViaMobilidade (Motiva)
- Platforms: Island platform

Construction
- Structure type: At-grade

Other information
- Station code: ABU

History
- Opened: 8 May 1922
- Closed: 30 April 2010
- Rebuilt: 23 April 2014
- Former names: Km 43; Fernão Dias

Services
Preceding station	São Paulo Metropolitan Trains	Following station
Terminus	Line 8	Ambuitá towards Júlio Prestes
Track layout
Location

Amador Bueno is a train station, belonging to ViaMobilidade Line 8-Diamond operational extension, located in the municipality of Itapevi, Brazil.

== History ==
Opened in a temporary building by Estrada de Ferro Sorocabana on May 8, 1922, the station was originally named Km 43 and, in 1928, Fernão Dias. In 1938, a permanent station building opened (which until June 21, 1985 served as the station building) and the station was renamed Amador Bueno.

During the modernization of the suburban train system carried out by FEPASA during the 1970s and 1980s, a new station building opened on June 21, 1985, which replaced the 1938 building, which was transformed into a cultural center by the Itapevi city council in 2004. In 1997, its ticket office was permanently closed by CPTM due to constant robberies; until 1998, the station also received FEPASA suburban trains coming from the city of Mairinque, located in the interior of São Paulo, with the service being informally nicknamed Mairinquinho. After being abandoned by the Itapevi city council, the 1938 building was demolished in 2012.

As of 2010, Amador Bueno was closed for reconstruction work on the operational extension. On April 23, 2014, it was reopened for assisted operation with Series 5000 trains from the extinct Fepasa after the 6.3 kilometer section (Itapevi–Amador Bueno) was remodeled and the station rebuilt with public toilets and accessibility for people with reduced mobility. In the same year, the section to Mairinque operated by the then América Latina Logística stopped receiving trains and, since its absorption by Rumo Logística in 2015, the Amador Bueno–Mairinque railway network was completely abandoned.

On April 20, 2021, the ViaMobilidade consortium, composed of the companies CCR (now Motiva) and RUASinvest, was awarded a thirty-year concession to operate the line. The concession contract was signed, and the line was transferred on January 27, 2022.

== Names of the station ==
After being inaugurated as Km 43 in 1922, the station later received two names: Fernão Dias and Amador Bueno. Fernão Dias (c.1608-1681) was a bandeirante, known by the nickname Emerald Hunter. In 1928, the Companhia Paulista de Estradas de Ferro opened a station in the Bauru region and also named it Fernão Dias. To avoid name confusion, the Estrada de Ferro Sorocabana renamed the station to Amador Bueno in the 1930s. Amador Bueno (c.1584-c.1649) was a bandeirante known for his participation in the historical episode known as the Acclamation of Amador Bueno, where he was proclaimed king and preferred to swear allegiance to King John IV of Portugal.
