= Júlio Prestes (CPTM) =

Railway station in São Paulo, Brazil

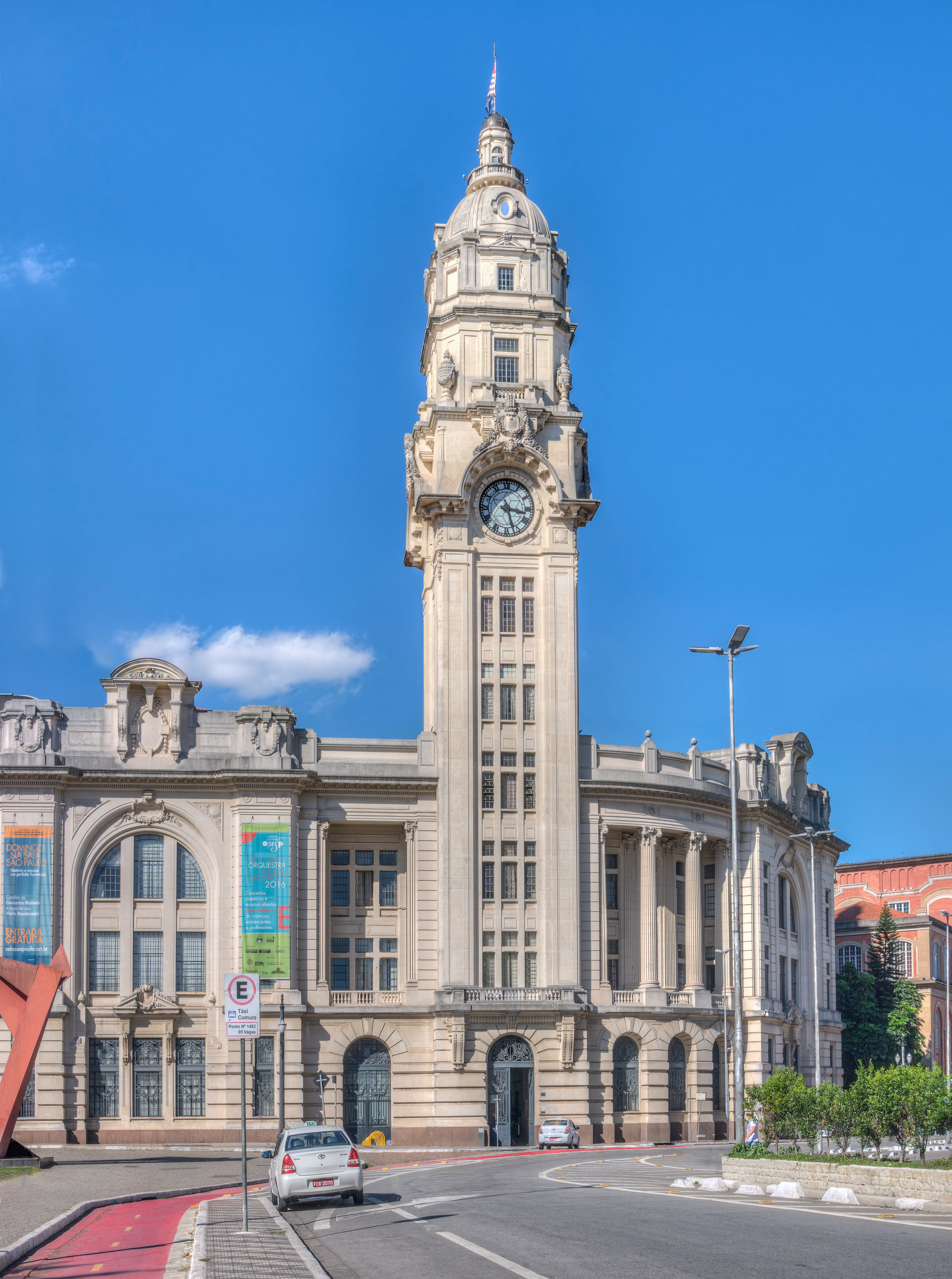
- Júlio Prestes station.

General information
- Location: Pça. Júlio Prestes, 148; Santa Cecília; Brazil
- Coordinates: 23.532778°S 46.640833°W
- Owner: Government of the State of São Paulo
- Operator: ViaMobilidade Linhas 8 e 9 (Motiva)
- Platforms: 2 island platforms 1 side platform

Construction
- Structure type: At-grade

Other information
- Station code: JPR

History
- Opened: 10 July 1872; 154 years ago
- Rebuilt: 15 December 1938; 87 years ago
- Former names: São Paulo

Services
Preceding station	São Paulo Metropolitan Trains	Following station
Palmeiras-Barra Funda towards Amador Bueno	Line 8	Terminus
Track layout
Location

Júlio Prestes is a train station on ViaMobilidade Linhas 8 e 9 Line 8-Diamond, located in the district of Santa Cecília in São Paulo. This historical station was named after former Governor of São Paulo and former President-elect of Brazil, Júlio Prestes. Currently, the station serves only Line 8-Diamond.

The station is the head office of the State Secretariat of Culture of São Paulo and, since 1999, the concert house for the São Paulo Symphonic Orchestra (Osesp), Sala São Paulo. In Praça Júlio Prestes, it is possible to see the bronze statue of Alfredo Maia and the iron abstract structure of Emanoel Araújo.

== History ==
The original stations was opened on 10 July 1872 by Estrada de Ferro Sorocabana, which was one of the most important railways in Brazil, and it was named São Paulo Station. Its function was to transport coffee bean bags from southwest and western São Paulo and northern Paraná to the capital. The old station was aside from Luz Station, what facilitated the coffee transportation for São Paulo Railway, the only railway that had a route from São Paulo to Santos. The station connected São Paulo to Piracicaba, Santos and Presidente Epitácio, on the border with Mato Grosso do Sul. After getting rich with the coffee transportation, it was decided to build a new and bigger station. The second and current station was projected by Cristiano Stockler das Neves and Samuel das Neves in 1925, but the construction was completed only in 1938, due to the economic instability, which affected almost all the capitalist countries at the time, caused by the Great Depression.

Even far from being completed, at the end of the construction of part of the project (platform area), the boarding began to work in this station.

=== Development ===
With 25,000 square metres (270,000 sq ft), the station was inspired by the New York terminals Grand Central and Pennsylvania and projected by architects Cristiano Stockler das Neves and Samuel das Neves. In 1927, the project was awarded in the 3rd Panamerican Architects Congress and has characteristics such as concrete structure and brick masonry. Columns and worked liners marked the Louis XVI style of the construction. Besides that, high right-foot gave the station a sensation of luxury and breadth, with sculptures in the clock tower and arcs in the windows. The platform of the station was built with metallic structure coming from the zeppelin hangar. In the interior of the station, there is a classic French garden with 960 square metres (10,300 sq ft), besides in the original project the space would be a hall surrounded by columns in Corinthian style and covered by stained glasses – but the lack of funds made unviable the majestic hall.

=== Transport Changes ===
Tram and train use declined after the crash of New York Stock Exchange in 1929 and the end of the coffee monoculture. By 1938 the increase of private cars and inter-municipal and interstate buses train use further declined which resulted in the bankruptcy of the Estrada de Ferro Sorocabana. In 1951, the station was renamed after the former President of the State of São Paulo, Júlio Prestes.

The station was abandoned a little time later. In the 1990s, Governor Mário Covas, attending a request of the maestro of the São Paulo Symphonic Orchestra, John Neschling, decided to restore the station in a way that the place where the gardens were located could be converted in a concert room, Sala São Paulo. The technical complexity to transform the station in a concert room required the collaboration of a large team. It was needed to analyze the criteria for the transformation and recovery of the building, preserving the existing historical site and discussing architectural, material, structural and technical questions, required for the consolidation of a concert room according to the requirements of acoustic and environmental isolations.

Besides the concert room, the station is also used for public transportation. Originally a start point for FEPASA South and West lines, currently attends the CPTM Line 8-Diamond trains, which has Itapevi and Amador Bueno as terminus stations. The station is also head office for the São Paulo State Secretariat of Culture.

At the request of CPTM, CONDEPHAAT approved a project of internal connection between Júlio Prestes and Luz stations, with the construction of a tunnel or passarela of approximately 200 metres (660 ft), with the objective relieve the demand on Luz station, which has two lines that connect with the Metro, while Júlio Prestes is terminus only for Line 8-Diamond.

=== Tourism ===
Júlio Prestes Station is a popular tourist attraction in São Paulo because of the architecture and the historical location. The locale includes Pinacoteca, where Walter Way Library can be found; the Resistance Memorial, which has records from the Military Regime; and the Museum of the Portuguese Language, which caught fire in December 2015. Outside the station in Praça Júlio Prestes is the bronze statue of Alfredo Maia, made by the sculptor Amadeu Zani.

== Photo gallery ==
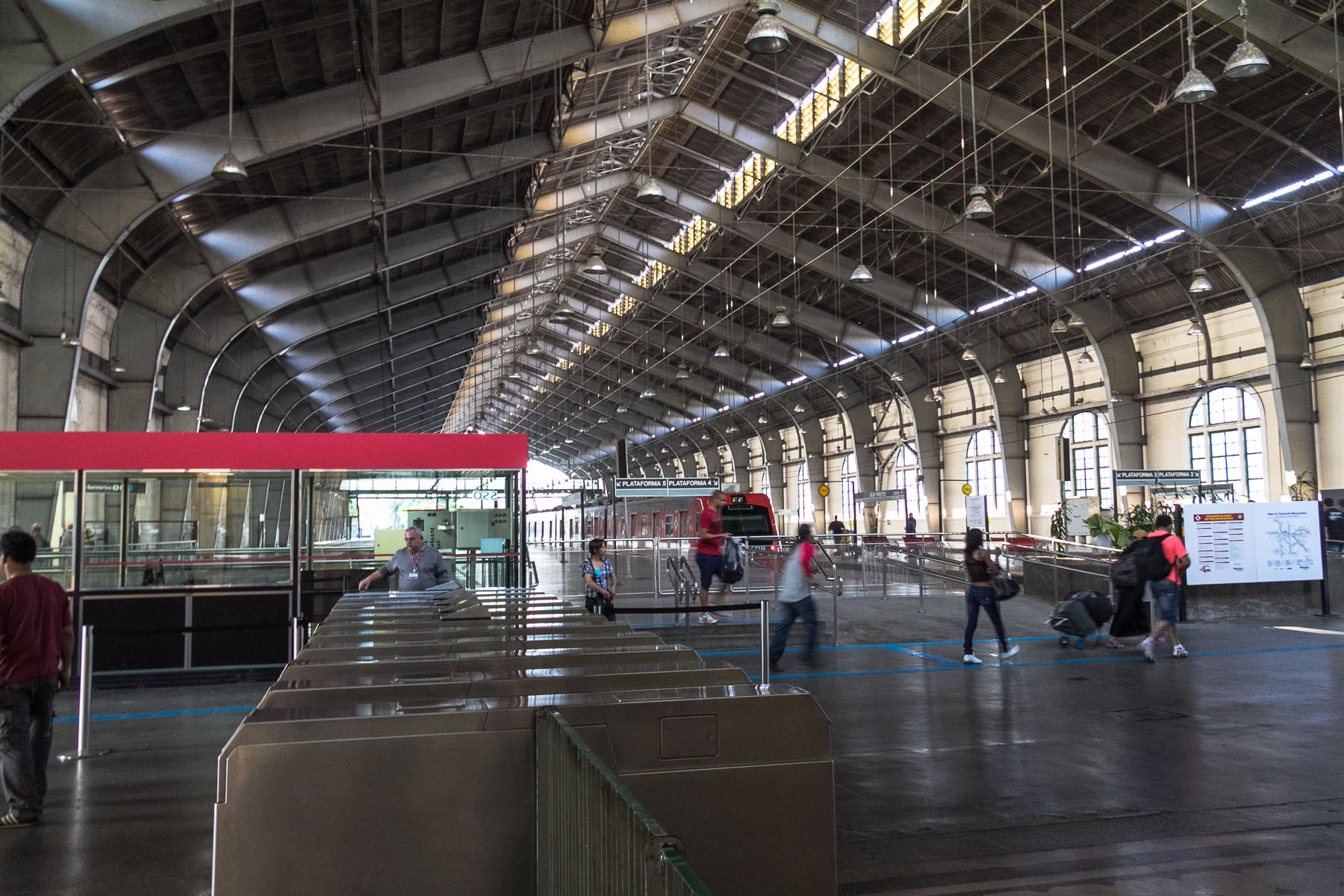
Platforms of Júlio Prestes Station in 2013

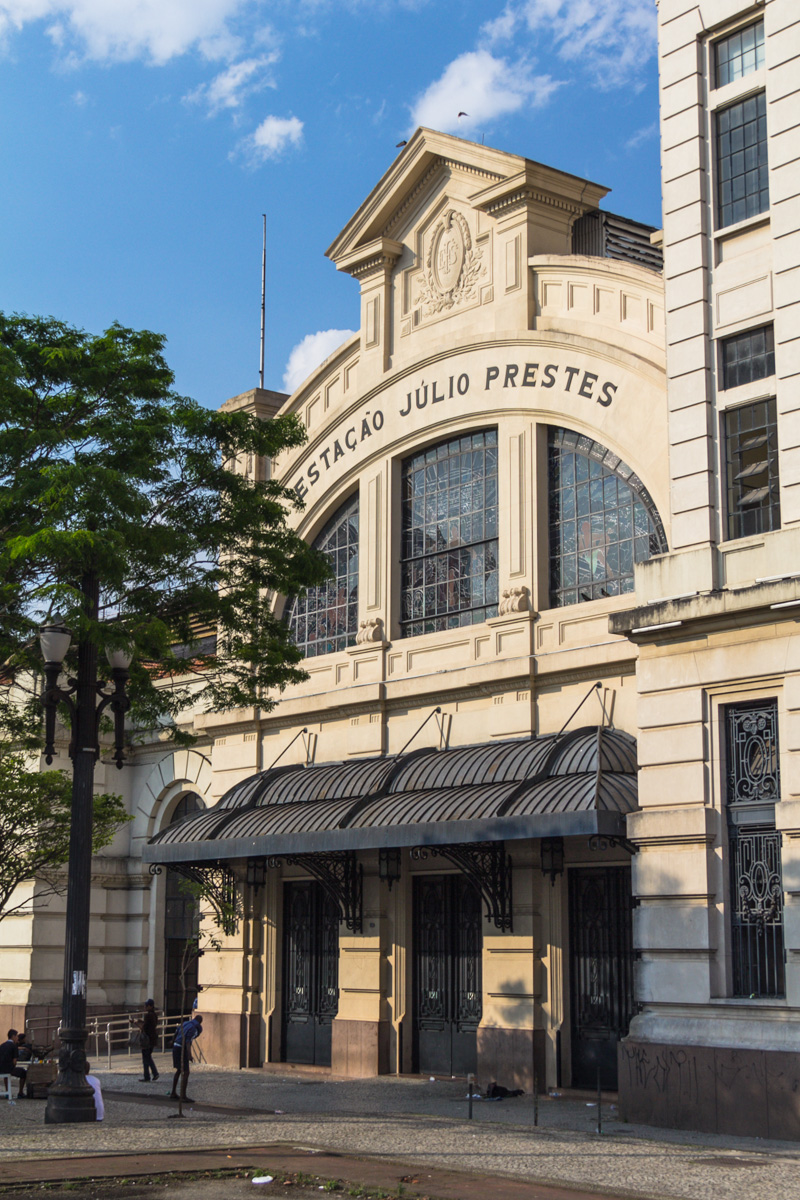
Júlio Prestes Station in 2013

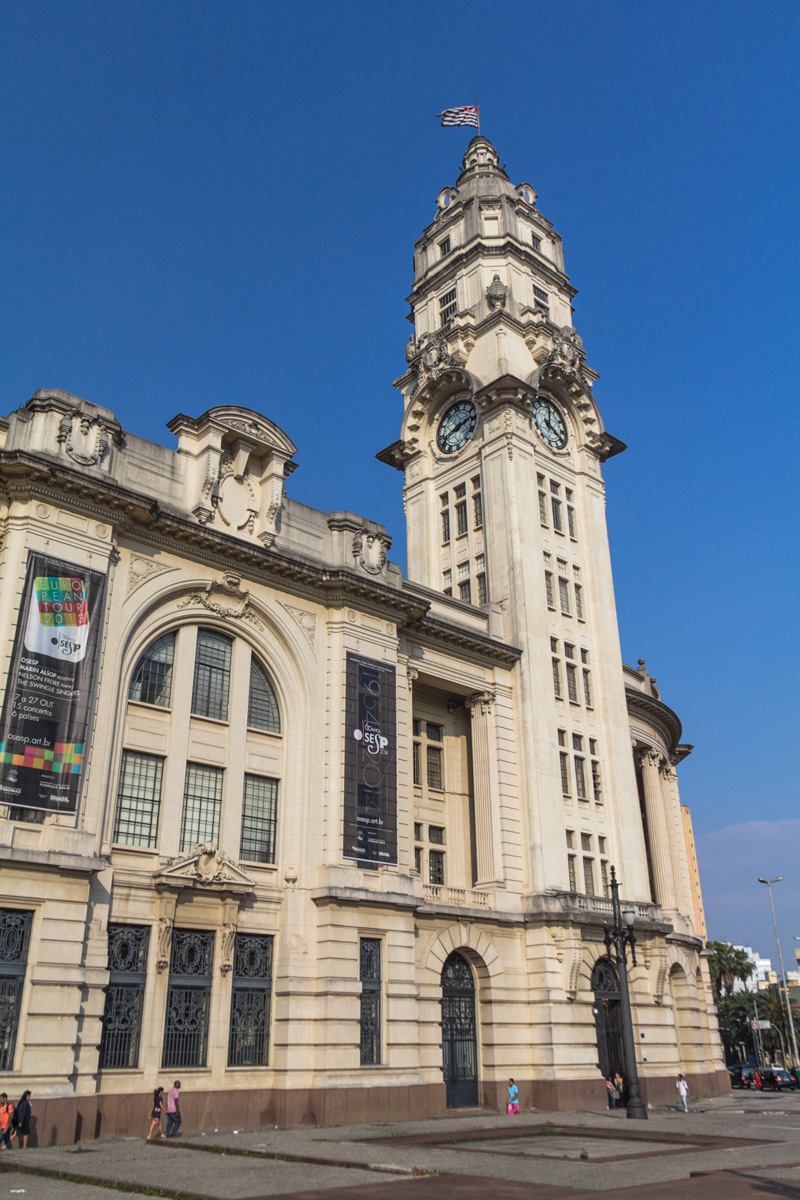
Entrance of the cultural room

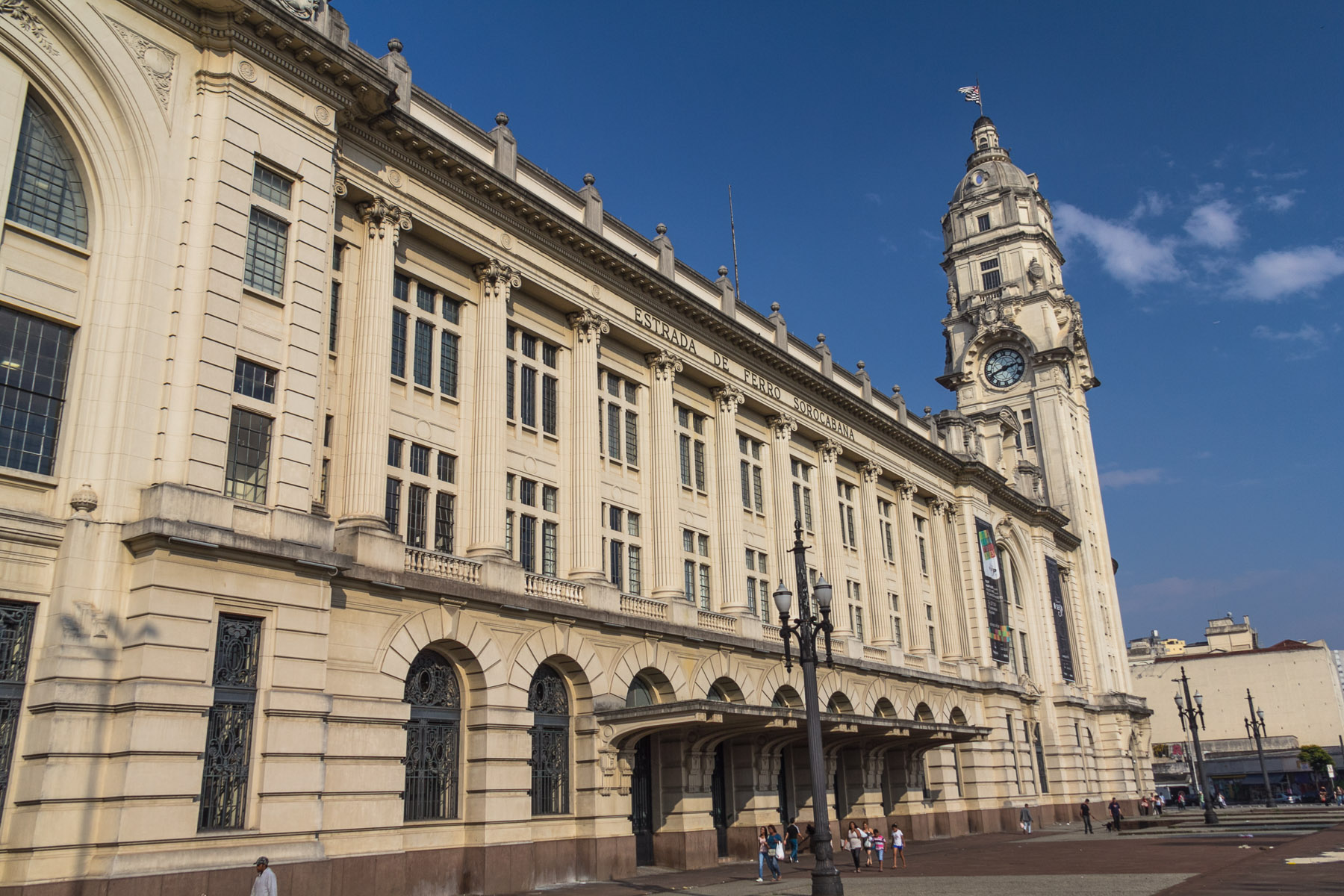
Side view of the station

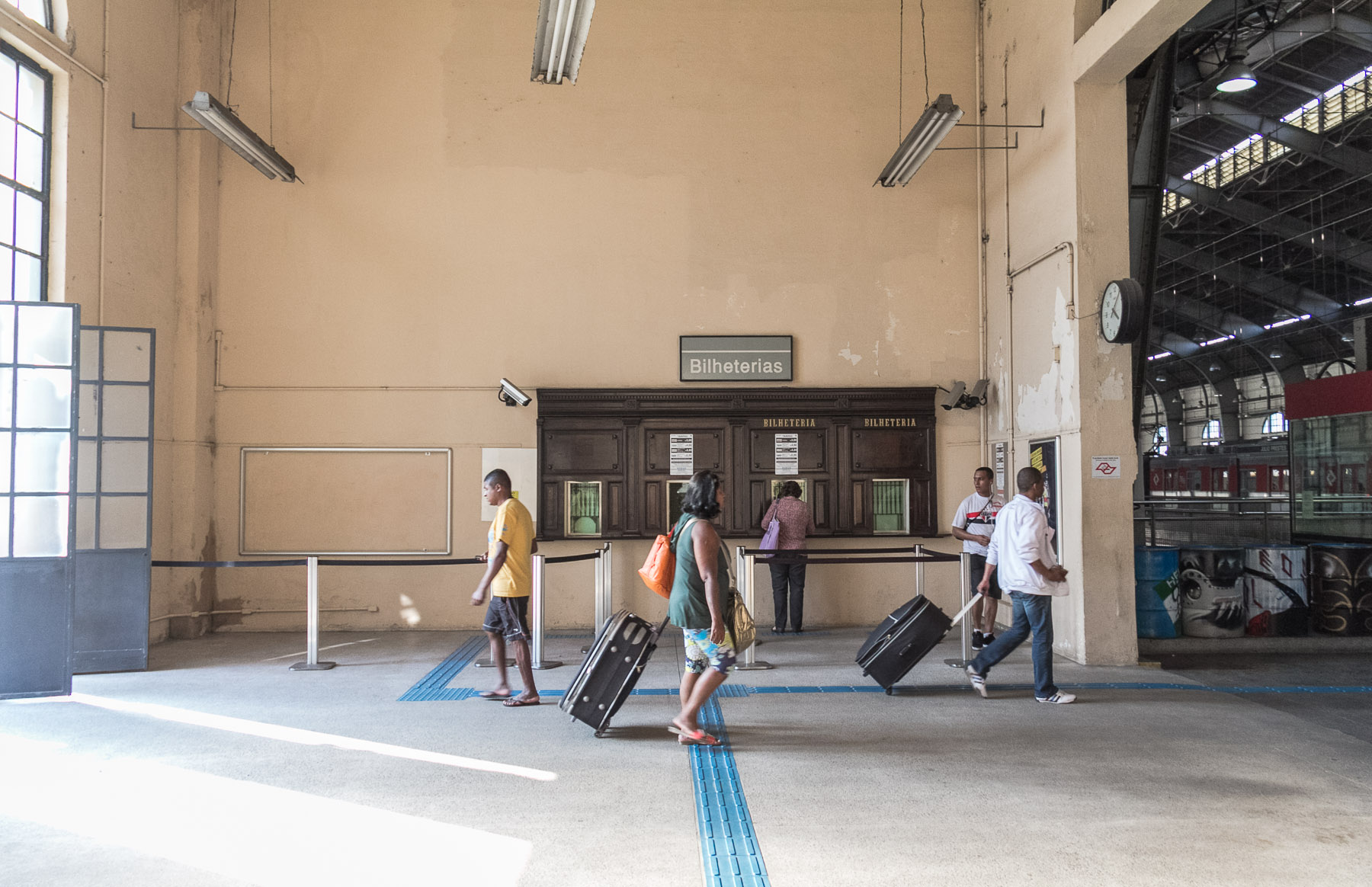
Ticket office of the station

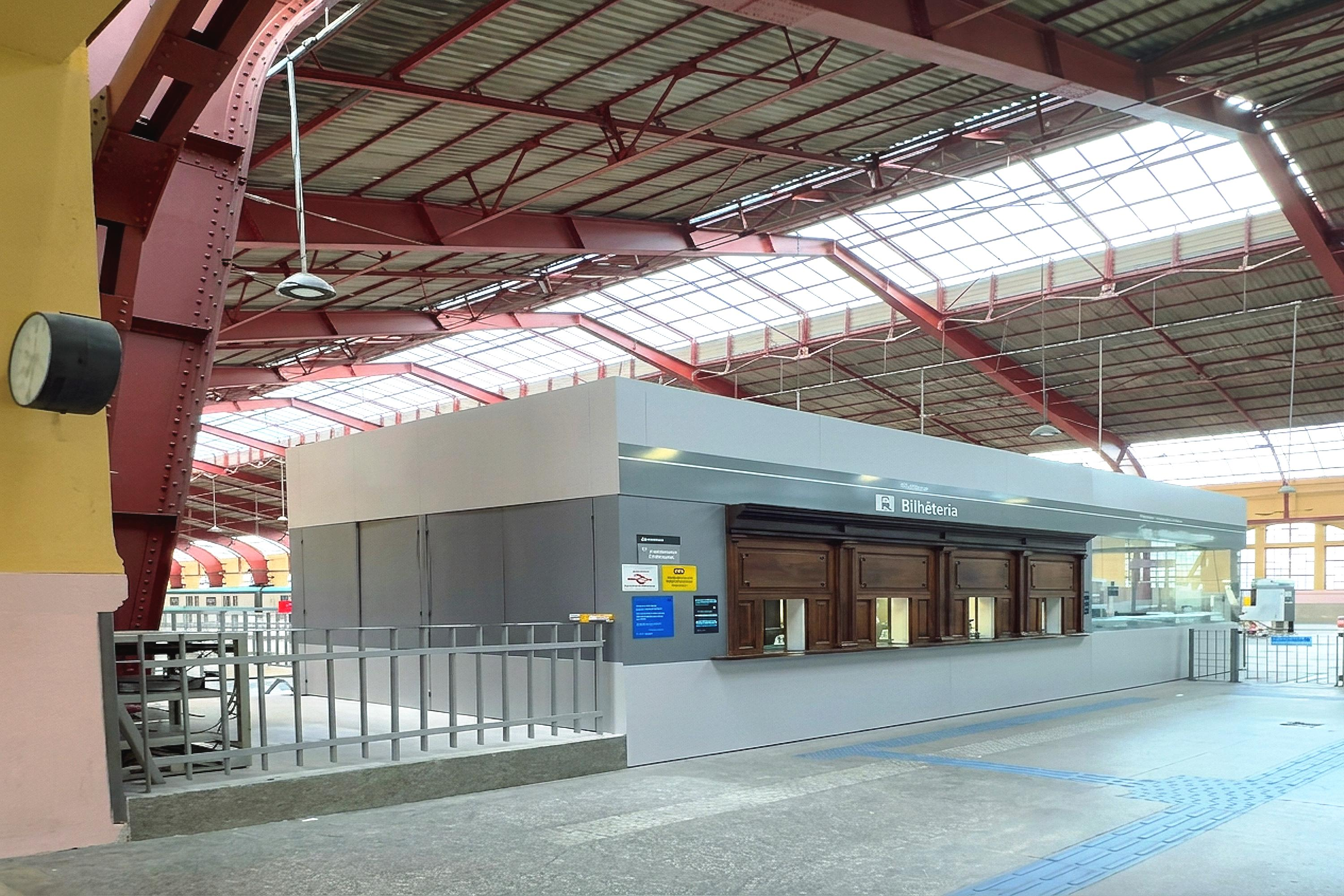
2026 Station Júlio Prestes Interior

== See also ==
- Sala São Paulo
- Orquestra Sinfônica do Estado de São Paulo (OSESP)
