= Carnival of São Paulo =

Carnival in Brazil

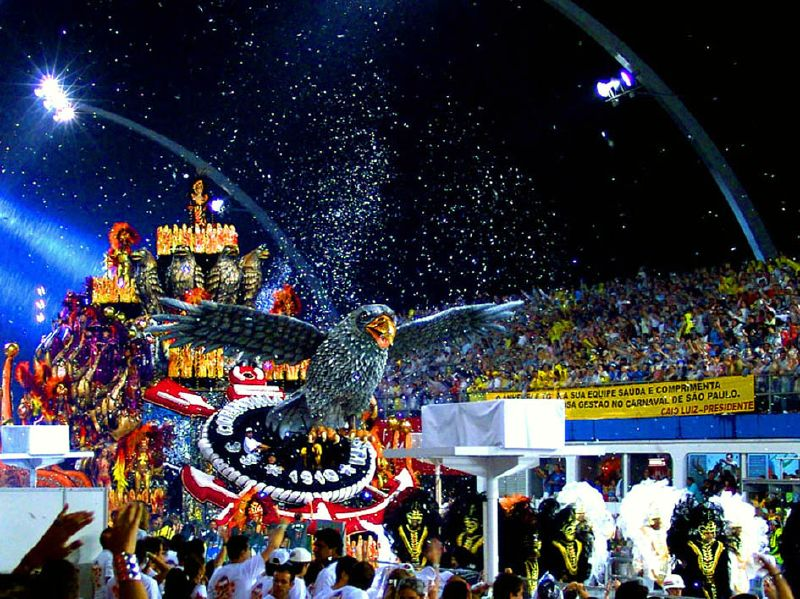
The 2005 São Paulo Carnival: The opening float (carro abre-alas) of the Gaviões da Fiel Samba school.

The Carnival of São Paulo (Portuguese: Carnaval de São Paulo) is a major Brazilian Carnival. It features a parade of samba schools and takes place in the Anhembi Sambadrome of São Paulo on the Friday and Saturday night of the week of Carnival. It is currently considered one of Brazil's biggest and most important popular events and is recognized as Cultural Heritage of Brazil and Intangible Heritage of the state by the Council for the Defense of Historical, Archaeological, Artistic and Tourist Heritage (CONDEPHAAT).

Carnival celebrations and the samba itself in São Paulo are slightly different from the Carnival in the city of Rio de Janeiro, though there is a clear difference in the rhythm of the sound – in other words, the speed and tempo of the music. Samba artists from São Paulo were accustomed to difficult lives on the coffee plantations and migrated to the city in search of labour work. The São Paulo author and journalist Plínio Marcos called São Paulo's samba "the samba of work, hardship, drawn to the drumming", which contrasted greatly with the lyricism and cadence of carioca samba from Rio de Janeiro. In addition, São Paulo samba was decisively influenced by other strongly percussive rhythms, such as jongo-macumba, also known as Caxambú. From that time dates the beginning of the relationship between Carnival and the law: the police repression suffered by samba performers, carried out harshly and without criteria. Samba performers, not only during Carnival but throughout the year, were seen as marginal figures and were harshly persecuted by the authorities. On the marginalized outskirts of a São Paulo under construction, the sound of percussion announced an immigrant culture that would later influence Brazilian culture in a definitive way.

== History ==
The origins of Carnival stem from a game from the 15th century in which people would throw water and other liquids at each other. Since then, it has evolved and taken different forms in the various places it has spread to. São Paulo was heavily influenced by the people who migrated from the countryside to the city, as well as by the context of the coffee sector crisis.3 Therefore, the population of São Paulo was the result of the rural exodus caused by the coffee crisis that triggered the beginning of the São Paulo Carnival.

In 1885, the first intervention of the Municipal Government of São Paulo in Carnival occurred, promoting the first carnival parade of the cordões that existed at the time. The cordões for a long time defined the musicality of the working-class population of São Paulo, and it was within them that São Paulo samba developed. However, the carnival manifestations of the less affluent classes, with strong Black influence, were practically ignored by the major press of the time, as well as by the public authorities, which sometimes repressed them extensively.

In 1914, the Cordão da Barra Funda was created by Dionísio Barbosa, this cordão being an ancestor of Camisa Verde e Branco. He lived in Rio de Janeiro, where he had contact with military bands and carnival groups that were popular in the 20th century, but the São Paulo carnival cordões displayed peculiar characteristics. At the front of the cordões came the Baliza, a character responsible for performing juggling with batons to open the way for the other members to pass, and who also defended the group's banner. The musical characteristics were the batucada, responsible for the rhythm and performed through percussion and wind instruments, highlighting the bass drum, and the choro, responsible for melodic and harmonic accompaniment; there were also string instruments. Other groups later stood out such as Geraldinos, Mocidade do Lavapés, Ruggerone and Campos Elyseos, the largest in the city at that time.

=== 1930s ===
In 1933 the Taça Arthur Friendenreich was instituted by the Frente Negra Brasileira, with the aim of valuing associations of African roots, which were mainly related to the rhythmic-musical characteristics and choreographies of samba, which until then were excluded from official contests. Participating were the Cordão da Barra Funda, Bloco do Boi, Cordão das Bahianas and Bloco da Mocidade. In 1934 the same competition was held again, being won by Vae-Vae.

Thanks to the influence of Rádio Nacional, which had begun broadcasting the carnival parades of Rio, Primeira de São Paulo emerged in 1935, considered the first samba school in the capital of São Paulo. In that year, associations of a more popular character were included in the official Carnival of the Municipality of São Paulo, which began to offer venue, stands, infrastructure, as well as support and officialize championships through the Conselho dos Festejos Populares, Recreações e Divertimentos da Cidade, or through federations. At that time there was still no clear differentiation in São Paulo between cordões, carnival blocks (blocos) and samba schools, which paraded competing in the same contest.

At that time there already existed the ranchos Mimosa, Príncipe Negro and Diamante Negro; the Cordões: Ruggerone, Campos Elyseos, Geraldinos, Baianas Paulista Marujos Paulistas, Vai-Vai, Cordão Camisas Verdes, Maricota, A.A. Bom Retiro, 13 de Maio, Sabratino, Barra Funda and Flor da Mocidade; the Blocos: Artistas de Cor, Caprichosos de São Paulo, 11 Irmãos Patriotas, Nossa Vida é Um Mistério, Enxada, Moderado and Roma; and the Samba Schools: Primeira de São Paulo, Desprezados da Penha, Grupo Regional Vim do Sertão and Mocidade do Lavapés. The parades began at Largo São Bento, went down Rua Libero Badaró and ended at Praça Patriarca or at Largo do São Bento, still in a rather informal way, where the schools, ranchos and cordões performed on a platform, with a judging table, and there sang marchinhas and presented their costumes. The champion was Mocidade do Lavapés and the runner-up was Desprezados da Penha.

=== 1940s and 1950s ===
The 1940s are marked by the affirmation of Blocos, Cordões and Schools. Other participants gathered in Largo da Banana (where the Memorial da América Latina currently stands), where between dances, capoeira kicks and card games, a very strong movement of São Paulo samba began to form in that space. In the East Zone of São Paulo, in the old Largo da Penha (where the Church of Penha is located), a movement very similar to that of Largo da Banana also emerged, with the poor Blacks and whites of the region. Even with about four samba schools active in São Paulo, the parades in Rio de Janeiro began to be publicized throughout Brazil, which ended up fostering and attracting the interest of the population of the city of São Paulo, which began to adopt and embrace the parades of the capital.

In 1940 the E.S. Preto e Branco was founded, and the association E.S. Henrique Dias was also created, which had Aparecido Durval de Oliveira as president; the school had its headquarters at Rua São Joaquim nº129, in the city center. During this period, the columnist of Folha da Manhã "Lord Charuto" also gained prominence, writing articles about São Paulo samba in the newspaper, in addition to the carnival institutions, pointing out the favorites and visiting neighborhoods where parades, processions and dances in general were held. In 1941 the first Grito de Carnaval was created, a partnership of the former clube Roxy with Primeira de São Paulo at the head of the festivities, thus taking place the first participation of a samba school in an entertainment show; the event was broadcast by Rádio Record throughout the country, also being the first transmission of a school from São Paulo throughout the national territory.

During the pre-carnival the first competition of Samba Schools, Blocos and Cordões took place, on 16 February, held in honor of Folha da Manhã (current Folha de S.Paulo); the parade was held in Largo do Arouche, in the República district.

The parade was broadcast to the entire capital and Greater São Paulo by the former Rádio Kosmos. Another curious fact that marked the pre-carnival that day was the competition of the 1940 champion of the Rio Carnival, Portela, which came to São Paulo to dispute a kind of Rio-SP contest of samba schools.

The school União de Filme Brasil tied, achieving a high result for the school up to that moment. The Carnival of São Paulo achieved a result while competing with Portela, a champion of the period.

The Carnaval do Povo (as the municipal contest was called) held several tournaments, together with radios and the city's press, held in the district of Bixiga; in addition to the contest, the day before there was a tiebreaker between Filme do Brasil and Portela, and there was turmoil due to the enormous repercussion and supporters who went to Casa do Ator to watch; according to news reports, about 5000 people attended.

In 1941 the most valuable tournament was the one held in "Cidade Folia", where Rádio São Paulo and the C.C.R-SP (Clube dos Cronistas Radiofônicos de São Paulo), together with the FEPSC (Federação das Pequenas Sociedades Carnavalescas), organized it with full coverage. Thus, in 1941 the true champion of the São Paulo Carnival was the bloco of Clube Ruggerone, composed of Italian and white workers from Lapa.

The Carnival of 1942 had its first stirrings at the beginning of February; on the 6th the "Primeira Batalha de Conffetti" took place, a tournament held by the CPCC and the Municipality with its "Carnaval do Povo", at Praça Fernando Prestes.

At the beginning of the decade, the Carnival of São Paulo was small, and the school that stood out most was Lavapés.

=== 1960s ===
During the 1960s several associations showed growth, with great prominence in the São Paulo scene for Unidos do Morro de Vila Maria (today Unidos de Vila Maria) and Unidos do Morro da Casa Verde (today Morro de Casa Verde), presided over by Xangô and Zezinho do Banjo respectively.

In mid-1967 the then mayor José Vicente Faria Lima (a native of Rio de Janeiro, born in Vila Isabel and an admirer of samba) regularized the parades on Avenida São João, and in 1968 officially established the festival by signing Law No. 7.100/67, intended to regulate the promotion of Carnival by the Municipal Government of São Paulo, and regulated by Decree No. 7.663/68.

This law, together with the creation of the Secretariat of Tourism and Promotion and the activities promoted by it, was part of a context of expansion of the cultural action of the municipality.

The enactment of the aforementioned law began the phenomenon called the "officialization of Carnival". Although apparently well intentioned, the action of the municipal government proved disastrous from a cultural point of view. This was because, although the sole paragraph of article 1 of the law stipulated several public investments in infrastructure to accommodate festivities at various points of the city, in addition to establishing funds and prizes, in practice the resources were destined solely to organize the parade of the Samba Schools, decreeing, through lack of incentive and resources, the end of the cordões and the link of the São Paulo Carnival with its cultural roots, institutionalizing the São Paulo Carnival.

=== 1970s ===
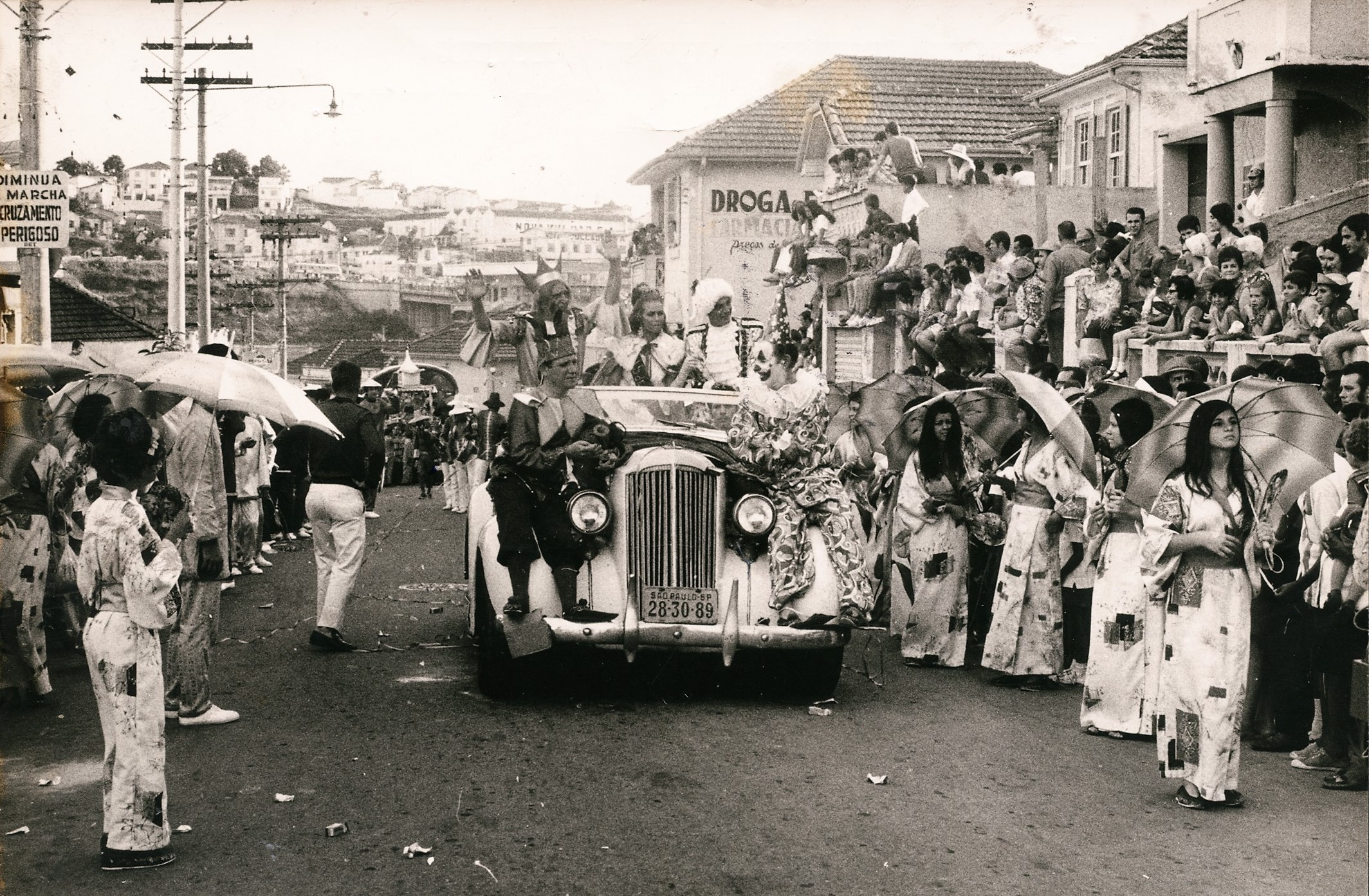
Street Carnival in São Paulo. Correio da Manhã.

In the 1970s "new" schools arrived; the first was Mocidade Alegre, previously a bloco, presided over by Juarez da Cruz. It passed through all the lower groups until in 1971, newly arrived in Group 1, it won the carnival and became a three-time champion, surprising the old guard of São Paulo samba. With a corsino style of evolution but presenting a completely new technique in the construction of floats and costumes, it was a reference during the years in which it won. The year 1972 was marked by the definitive death of the cordões: Vai-Vai, Camisa Verde e Branco, Paulistano da Glória, and Fio de Ouro no longer received support from the municipal government, and thanks to recognition of their greatness in the segment in which they then participated, the greatest champions (Vai-Vai, Camisa Verde e Branco and Fio de Ouro) received an invitation to participate in the main parade of schools. Already in the first year all of them surprised, to the point that Camisa Verde e Branco ended the series of Mocidade Alegre and achieved a four-time championship between 1974 and 1977. From then on what was seen was a dominance of corsina schools. In 1978, with the theme "Na Arca de Noel, Quem Entrou Não Saiu Mais", Vai-Vai won and achieved its first title among the schools.

In September 1973, with the objective of organizing a council of samba schools and participating in the organization of the São Paulo Carnival together with the municipal government, the UESP (União das Escolas de Samba Paulistanas) emerged, which would organize the contests for the next decade.

In 1979, with the excellent samba "Almôndegas de Ouro", Camisa Verde e Branco again became champion, thus confirming the title of greatest samba school of the 1970s. In addition to this historical milestone of Camisa, that year the newcomer Pérola Negra, with the theme Carnaval, Intrigas e Opiniões, achieved an honorable 5th place, finishing ahead of the traditional Rosas de Ouro. The school from Vila Madalena achieved in 1979 its best position in the São Paulo Special Group. Another notable fact was the change of parade route, leaving the city center and moving to Avenida Tiradentes in 1977, where stands were built that could accommodate, although with little infrastructure, thirty thousand people. The track then became longer with 732 m and wider, forcing the schools to "zigzag" during the parades, marking a very São Paulo style of evolution.

Another victory of the São Paulo Carnival came during the program Fantástico of TV Globo: in 1978, Paulistano da Glória won the "1º Concurso Nacional de Sambas-Enredo", with "Epopeia da Glória", composed by Geraldo Filme, perhaps one of the greatest samba composers in the country. In 1979 the contest was again won by São Paulo, this time with representation from Nenê de Vila Matilde with "Treze, Rei, Patuá". The 1970s were also marked by the arrival of Sociedade Rosas de Ouro, a school from the neighborhood of Vila Brasilândia, which in the 1980s would establish itself as a powerhouse.

=== 1980s ===
At the beginning of the 1980s, Mocidade Alegre won with the theme "Embaixada, Sonho de Bamba", one of the greatest sambas in history; it won the São Paulo eliminations of Fantástico and was presented to the entire country. That same year marked the first appearance of a 19-year-old girl at the microphone of a small samba school from the East Zone; she was Eliana de Lima, who led the school Príncipe Negro da Vila Prudente. However, the first female samba lead singer in São Paulo was Ivonete of Acadêmicos do Peruche, and soon afterward in 1977 another great lead singer appeared, Bernadete at Acadêmicos do Tatuapé. In 1981 and 1982 Vai-Vai was champion in a fierce dispute with Nenê de Vila Matilde, which brought epic sambas in those two years: "Axé, Sonho De Candeia" in 1981 and "Palmares, Raiz da Liberdade" in 1982, reaching runner-up with the latter while producing one of the greatest parades in history. The year 1981 also marked the arrival of Dom Marcos as lead singer of Cabeções da Vila Prudente, and Royce do Cavaco assisting Tunicão at Rosas de Ouro.

The year 1983 was marked by the victory of Rosas de Ouro, in a year when rain was the defining factor; the "Roseira" performed a very technical parade on Tiradentes Avenue with the theme "Nostalgia", singing about old São Paulo. President Eduardo Basílio, as a sign of luck, abandoned African themes and bet on producing typically São Paulo carnivals. During that year the school Flor de Vila Dalila, in its first year, brought the samba "Exaltação ao Criador", very famous among samba performers in the city, and thanks to popular acceptance achieved a surprising 7th place. Once again Nenê brought a samba that became one of the anthems of the São Paulo Carnival. "Gosto é Gosto e Não Se Discute" was acclaimed by the public and critics and helped the school present another great carnival.

In 1984 Rosas de Ouro again stood out with a theme that told the history of the Faculty of Law of Largo São Francisco in São Paulo, and the school achieved a two-time championship. Perhaps this was the most contested year in the history of São Paulo samba, where in the dispute there could easily have been six schools competing head to head for the title (Rosas, Camisa, Nenê, Barroca, Mocidade and Vai-Vai), which made the victory of Rosas de Ouro even greater. However, the samba itself did not receive great popular acceptance; the most sung samba that night was that of União Independente da Vila Prudente, which brought as its theme Elis Regina. Another fact that marked the carnival of 1984 was the newly arrived Águia de Ouro, with enormous floats telling the history of theater and with the promise Royce do Cavaco; the school was very applauded, to the point of being pointed out as a favorite, but poorly understood and suffering a clear boycott for being a newcomer, it was relegated, which to this day remains a reason for protest in Pompeia.

The following year (1985) brought a surprise: the Secretariat of Tourism, Anhembi and UESP joined with the entities that promote the festival in Rio de Janeiro and proclaimed: "The winner of the São Paulo Carnival will parade in Rio de Janeiro." There was a rush everywhere; luxury took over all the schools, and there was tremendous effort from everyone. The champion was Nenê de Vila Matilde, thus ending a drought of 15 years without a title and becoming the first and only São Paulo school to parade at the Sambadrome Marquês de Sapucaí, and with much merit, since until that year Nenê was the school with the most titles in the São Paulo Carnival, having won 10 up to that moment. But that night, perhaps what few know is that the most acclaimed was Barroca Zona Sul, which with the theme "Chico Rei – O Esplendor de Uma Raça" did on the avenue what Vila Isabel would only do three years later, using rustic materials such as straw, sisal and various handicrafts. The factor that cost the school the title was delay in parade time, which deducted 6 points and removed the school from first place. Another curiosity was Unidos do Peruche, which took Eliana de Lima from Barroca Zona Sul and with the samba "Água Cristalina" conquered Brazil and won the Fantástico contest.

In 1986 the champion was Vai-Vai and Thobias da Vai-Vai emerged there. Perhaps the sad news came from the split that the associations had with UESP, in a dispute between Walter Guaríglio, Eduardo Basílio, Chiclé of Vai-Vai, Carlos Thobias and Seu Nenê. Everything began after an incident where the judge Júlio Medaglia gave a score of 9.2 to Camisa Verde e Branco, which led its president to climb onto the judging table and tear up all the scores. After meetings, one of which lasted almost four hours in the bathroom of the Ibirapuera Gymnasium, declarations from all champion schools, and months of uncertainty and civil litigation, during the year the Liga Independente das Escolas de Samba de São Paulo emerged; the name of the main parade changed and came to be called the Special Group.

The most affected in the history was Nenê de Vila Matilde, which believing the split would be temporary and as the main founder of UESP remained in the entity and lost much strength among the major schools, falling to the background.

From 1987 onward, the organization of the Samba Schools came to be carried out in the current format with the founding of the Liga Independente das Escolas de Samba de São Paulo – LigaSP, which in a certain way replaced UESP without extinguishing it, since the representation of associations became bipartite: the Schools of the Special Group and the Access Group (respectively the first and second divisions) were represented by the aforementioned LigaSP, and the Schools of the lower groups as well as the blocos by UESP, which ceased to represent all schools as it had since its foundation. In 1990 the mayor Luiza Erundina sanctioned Law No. 10.831 which, according to its amendment, "socializes the Carnival of the City of São Paulo, revokes Law No. 7.100/67, and provides other measures". This law assigns to the municipal government, through article 3 C/c article 2 II, the responsibility to organize the Carnival through Anhembi S/A.

In 1987 the season of brilliant sambas was marked as well as the appearance of associations such as Acadêmicos do Tucuruvi and Colorado do Brás (which arrived in 1986). The dispute was once again great. Unidos do Peruche appeared with a new style of evolution (the style used today), abandoning the "zigzag" and bringing floats and costumes outside the São Paulo standard thanks to the exchanges that president Walter Guaríglio frequently made with Rio de Janeiro. Camisa Verde e Branco came with the daring of Mestre Divino; Mocidade Alegre arrived with the most beautiful samba of the year, sung in the first person, "50 Anos de Comunicação – Moraes Sarmento"; and Vai-Vai and Nenê de Vila Matilde performed strongly and had their sambas acclaimed by the public and accepted by critics. The champion by a narrow margin, however, was Vai-Vai, thanks to errors that cost Camisa Verde e Branco the title, when a float broke in front of the float judging booth and the school faced great difficulties with the sound car.

In the year of the centenary of abolition, a single theme was studied for all the schools, but the idea did not move forward, causing general relief among the schools' carnival designers. In 1988 the enormous growth of Unidos do Peruche was marked as it brought to the São Paulo avenue the greatest interpreter in history, Jamelão. Other facts that stood out were Colorado do Brás, which with the greatest samba after "Narainã – A Alvorada dos Pássaros" of Camisa Verde in 1977 came without floats, only with its opening float and some tripods, singing "Quilombo Catopês do Milho Verde – De Escravo a Rei da Festa"; Flor de Vila Dalila, which brought to the microphone Carlinhos de Pilares, the already renowned interpreter from Rio; Nenê de Vila Matilde brought that year one of the sambas most loved by its community, "Zona Leste Somos Nós", speaking about the region the school represents, the most populous and poorest region of the city. However the school had changes, hiring Chuveiro in place of Armando da Mangueira, who had been at the East Zone school since 1979 after a period from 1968 to 1975 when he went to Unidos do Peruche to revive the partnership he had with Jamelão in the 1960s. Camisa Verde e Branco brought for the last time "Dona Sinhá", who despite being very ill insisted on parading with the school; the school was the first to bring floats illuminated with "neon light" in São Paulo. With the theme "Boa Noite São Paulo – Um Convite Para Amar", the school achieved a third consecutive runner-up finish. The samba-enredo of Rosas de Ouro, led by Royce do Cavaco, became a classic, immortalized in sports broadcasts (through the refrain Pra frente é que se toca a bola. E a bola rola trazendo emoção...). Barroca, which was returning, brought "Novamente" by the renowned carnival designer from Rio Edson Machado, and Pé Rachado stepped onto Avenida Tiradentes for the last time. The trophy went to Vai-Vai, performing a sweeping and perfect parade with the theme "Amado Jorge – A História da Raça Brasileira".

In 1989 there was once again an astonishing leap, though not by all schools. Unidos do Peruche had for years been making exchanges in Rio de Janeiro, growing since 1985; in 1989 it reached its peak with "Os 7 Tronos dos Divinos Orixás", counting on icons such as Joãosinho Trinta, Laíla and Jamelão. The school caused perhaps the greatest impact that Avenida Tiradentes had ever seen, with grandiose floats and unmatched quality in costumes; Peruche was so dominant that all schools that followed did not surpass 278.00 points. However, even arriving as the clear favorite, Peruche lost to a strong overall performance by Camisa Verde e Branco, which also counted on the help of Dona Zica, a supporter of the school who gave the maximum score only to the Barra Funda school, generating great controversy at the time. Another surprise of the night came from Leandro de Itaquera, which upon arriving from Group 1 brought Eliana de Lima and the theme "Babalotim, a História dos Afoxés". The samba and the percussion of the renowned Mestre Lagrila were the highlight of the parade, and the interpretation by lead singer Eliana de Lima of this samba, which is a masterpiece of composition, is considered one of the best in the history of Carnival.

=== 1990s ===
Law No. 10,831/90 triggered the last change of address for the Carnival parades, which took place in 1991, when they began to be held at the Polo Cultural Grande Otelo, a large parade avenue of more than five hundred meters built on Avenida Olavo Fontoura, and popularly known as the Anhembi Sambadrome. This venue, owned by Anhembi S/A, has hosted the parades ever since, and it is still used for various events of the most varied kinds.

The following year was marked by the weather; as in 1983, it rained almost all night, and what was seen was schools of the stature of Nenê de Vila Matilde going through one of the worst moments in their history, with backstage problems: the carnival designer Antônio Carlos fought with members of the school days before the parade and, when it was time to take the floats to Av. Tiradentes, the Matildenses found two trucks blocking the exit of the floats from their own shed; as a result, the school finished in 8th place, 1 point above relegation. Other notable facts were the stripped-down parade (without any floats) of Pérola Negra, the arrival of Gaviões da Fiel, and the first tie of the modern era of our carnival. Camisa Verde e Branco, which had been an outsider, ended up tied with the school of Eduardo Basílio (Rosas de Ouro), and both took the title.

For 1991, the debut of the Anhembi Sambadrome was reserved, with a shorter track (about 521 m) and wider than the old parade avenue. A time limit of 1 h 10 min was established for the parades, a reduction of 10 minutes from the previous time limit. Another change was the end of the Letra do Samba judging category, which thus joined melody and became Samba-Enredo. The debut was by Passo de Ouro, which in 1997 merged with X-9 Paulistana. 1991 was once again marked by a leap in the quality of the schools, and perhaps the greatest evolution of that night can be seen in the parades of Nenê de Vila Matilde with Tito Arantes as carnival designer and Leandro de Itaquera with Pedrinho Pinotti. Both schools from the East Zone came with large and well-finished floats, but bad luck struck the Vila Matilde school, which was hit by a real "pé d'água" that harmed its parade. Leandro, meanwhile, achieved its best placement in the special group to this day, finishing in 4th place. The favorites of the night were Vai-Vai, Rosas de Ouro – which brought the theme "De Piloto de Fogão, a Chefe da Nação", honoring women – and Camisa Verde e Branco, which brought the theme "Combustível da Ilusão", an allusion to beer. The result was another tie between Camisa and Rosas.

For 1992, the qualification draw system was abolished. Rosas de Ouro, with the theme Non Dvcor Dvco – Qual é a Minha Cara?, honoring the city of São Paulo, won the championship title despite having problems with the scores. Schools such as Camisa Verde e Branco and Nenê de Vila Matilde complained greatly about this result, to the point that Seu Nenê tore up the score sheets and Camisa went to court.

In 1993 there were changes to the structure of the Sambadrome: work began on grandstand A, sectors C, D, and E underwent renovations, and the track became better lit after the replacement of the floodlights. Coming from the access group were Imperador do Ipiranga, which had not participated since 1988, and Acadêmicos do Tucuruvi. There was no relegation in 1992 thanks to problems with the scores, and LIGA decided to keep Colorado do Brás and Barroca Zona Sul. Notable changes were the departure of Osvaldinho from Nenê, replaced by Renato as carnival designer; Gaviões da Fiel brought in Raul Diniz; and Pedrinho Pinotti left Leandro de Itaquera and went to Colorado do Brás. At the microphone appeared Serginho K.T. at Imperador, Djalma Pires at Tucuruvi, Armando da Mangueira, Márcia Ynaiá, and Dom Marcos at Nenê. Barroca brought a pagode group to the microphone, Arte Final. The year was marked by several incidents. The first happened at Imperador – with a series of problems in transporting the floats to Anhembi, many floats paraded with problems, and the school that should have come with 10 floats came with 6. Mocidade Alegre, which brought an Argentine to the role of carnival designer, singing about Lebanon, also had problems, and the school tried to move away the barriers that mark the proper width of the avenue, causing a fight between the school's harmony directors and other directors from the various schools. Camisa Verde, Rosas, and Vai-Vai were again singled out as favorites. As a result, there was a tie between Vai-Vai and Camisa; rivals in the past, they sang together in the Anhembi parking lot.

In 1994 there was the notable departure of Thobias from Vai-Vai. At the microphone since 1986, he fought with school directors and had no position for 1994. The torrential rain that fell on Anhembi caused numerous problems for all associations, and more than 70% of the schools had deductions. This carnival also featured VIP Judges such as Ronaldo Ésper and Pedro de Lara. Promoted that year were two newcomers: Unidos de São Miguel and Primeira da Aclimação; one brought Gogó do Gato to the microphone and Mestre Lagrila as head of the percussion section, and the other brought someone known from the eliminations but unknown to the general public until then: Lello Garoto.

At the start of the parades there was Unidos de São Miguel, a school from the East Zone that had never managed to parade with the city's biggest schools, but which made a good debut within its technical limitations. It was followed by Primeira da Aclimação singing about wine. Unidos do Peruche – heavily affected by the rain – sang the theme that told the story of Xangô's visit to the Kingdom of Oyo, lost several floats along the parade route, exceeded the time limit, and lost 14 points. Mocidade Alegre brought to the avenue an appeal for the union of Latin American peoples, and also had difficulties, with floats left in the staging area and many harmony problems. Leandro de Itaquera sang about the Tietê, presented by Eliana de Lima. Trying to recreate the 1993 performance, in which it had made a good showing that won it a place in the champions' parade, Acadêmicos do Tucuruvi came with a theme about the sidewalks of Lapa. However, its opening float broke moments before entering the track, the school suffered in its evolution, and ended up with only 2 floats parading (where 7 were planned). Next was Rosas de Ouro, singing a samba in tribute to the singer Angela Maria entitled "Sapoti". Its parade was marked by incomplete floats, members parading without full costumes, the reordering of the wings, and two broken floats. Camisa Verde e Branco brought a theme about the people's dream of always being young, and was another school with broken floats. The biggest controversy involved Vai-Vai: the school sang Inã-Gbé, lost 17 points for exceeding the time limit and because the LIGA committee alleged that the school had put the public at risk with the 3 fire-eaters who came in front of the opening commission breathing flames.

The 10th to go onto the track was Nenê de Vila Matilde, which did not face heavy rain and benefited from using costumes and floats without feathers. The only failure was not having presented the theme at the right time, losing 2 points. It was followed by Barroca Zona Sul, and with a blue sky after a rainy night, the school had a sad setback when its first flag bearer paraded without the flag. Lastly, closing the night, came Gaviões da Fiel in full daylight; the school told the story of tobacco through the ages and brought a set with beautiful costumes and harmony. It ended up being harmed by a judge who gave a score of 6 in harmony and 7 in percussion, taking away the expectation of the title. To this day members protest greatly and say that they were the true champions of 1994. The lesson drawn from 1994 was significant: the first was float construction, which ceased to be built only on axles, and chassis began to be used for structure. The second was the use of better materials more resistant to water. From 1994 onward, penalties began to be smaller, and the entire rulebook was revised.

In 1995, Gaviões da Fiel Torcida won its first title with its samba-enredo "Coisa boa é pra sempre", which talked about childhood. Gaviões da Fiel moved people with the samba and the parade, which is considered one of the greatest in the history of the São Paulo carnival. Another school that moved the avenue was Nenê de Vila Matilde, which sang "Eu Te Amo". The problem was that the school entered very late, because the League said it had sounded the alarm warning that the school's parade had begun, but the members did not hear it because the percussion section was playing too loudly.

After remaining for about 1/4 of the available parade time waiting to enter the avenue, Nenê lost a great deal of time, but managed to finish the parade within the correct time. The school was harmed by the rush and finished only in 6th place, but it would certainly have competed with Gaviões da Fiel for that year's title. Another important fact was the emergence of a newcomer, X-9 Paulistana, which years later would enter the group of the greats.

In 1996 Vai-Vai won another title with "A rainha, a noite transforma", about the queen of the night: Lilian Gonçalves. That year's title was unquestioned, with a great performance by the school from Bela Vista. The other important fact of the year was the relegation of Camisa Verde e Branco, which shocked the samba world. The school had problems on and off the avenue, and ended up being relegated along with Pérola Negra, which came with the theme "Navegar é preciso". The tragicomic highlight was Nenê, which had ambitious plans to enter with the largest eagle on the opening float of all its carnivals, but the bird's wings (6 meters each) did not pass through the 1st arch of the Sambadrome, and the eagle entered the avenue without wings.

1997 was the year of the aforementioned newcomer; having been in the Special Group only since 1995, X-9 Paulistana, with "Amazônia, a dama do universo", won its first title, a title considered deserved by some and questionable by others, as that year saw major parades by two of São Paulo's most traditional schools, Nenê and Vai-Vai. The school from the East Zone brought to the avenue "Narciso Negro", which is considered an anthem for Black people in the city of São Paulo and one of the school's great sambas, but finished in third place. Singing about Minas Gerais and the Inconfidência Mineira, Vai-Vai also shook the avenue and snatched a runner-up finish.

The 1998 carnival had as its great winner Vai-Vai, with "Banzai Vai-Vai", relating to the 90 years of Japanese immigration to Brazil. It is regarded as the greatest parade in the school's history up to that time. Camisa that year returned to the group of the greats, and, speaking about photography, reached 3rd place, showing the strength of the school from Barra Funda. Mocidade Alegre came with the theme "Essas Maravilhosas Mulheres Ousadas" and, with a daring parade, reached 4th place. Nenê, stung by 1997, paid tribute to Estação Primeira de Mangueira, the great rival of its godmother Portela, in Rio de Janeiro. Featuring a one-surdo percussion section and the old guard of the green-and-pink school, it reached the runner-up position.

The 1999 carnival was the biggest up to that point. But, overall, two schools stood out, Vai-Vai and Nenê again. The school from Bela Vista sang "Nostradamus" and, with a parade of strong visual impact, known as "the parade of skulls", reached the title. Nenê drew the grandstands along talking about its 50 years, and emerged as the great favorite; it led the scoring, but lost in the float category because of a broken sculpture, in addition to a float that remained in the staging area, which caused it to lose points in Theme. The surprise came from Gaviões da Fiel, which ended up sharing the title with Saracura, leaving Nenê in third place.

=== 2000s ===
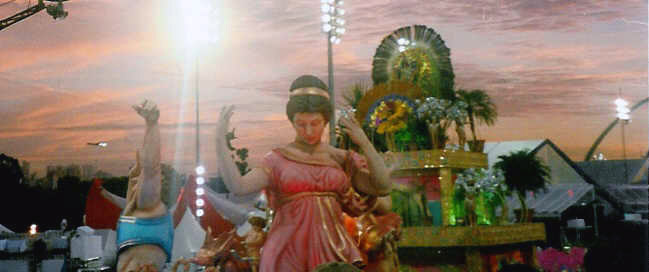
Opening float of Rosas de Ouro in 2005.

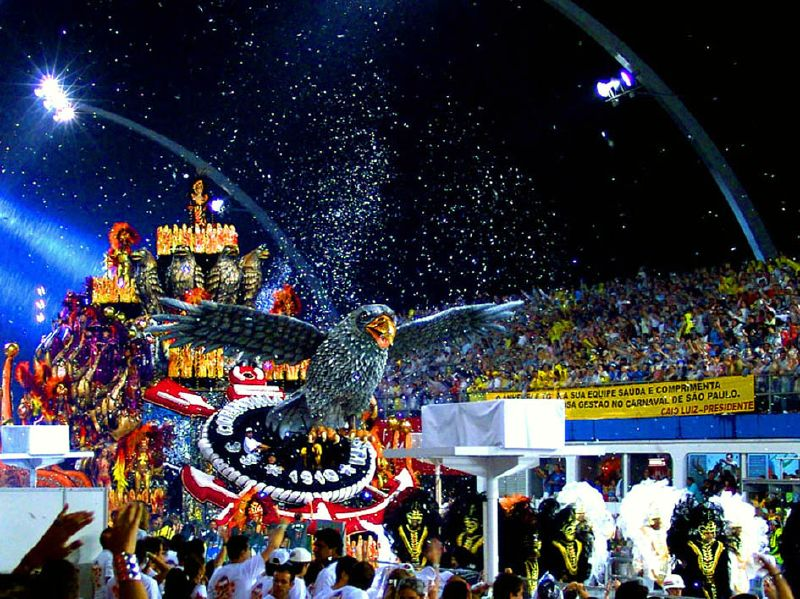
Opening float of the samba school Gaviões da Fiel in 2005.

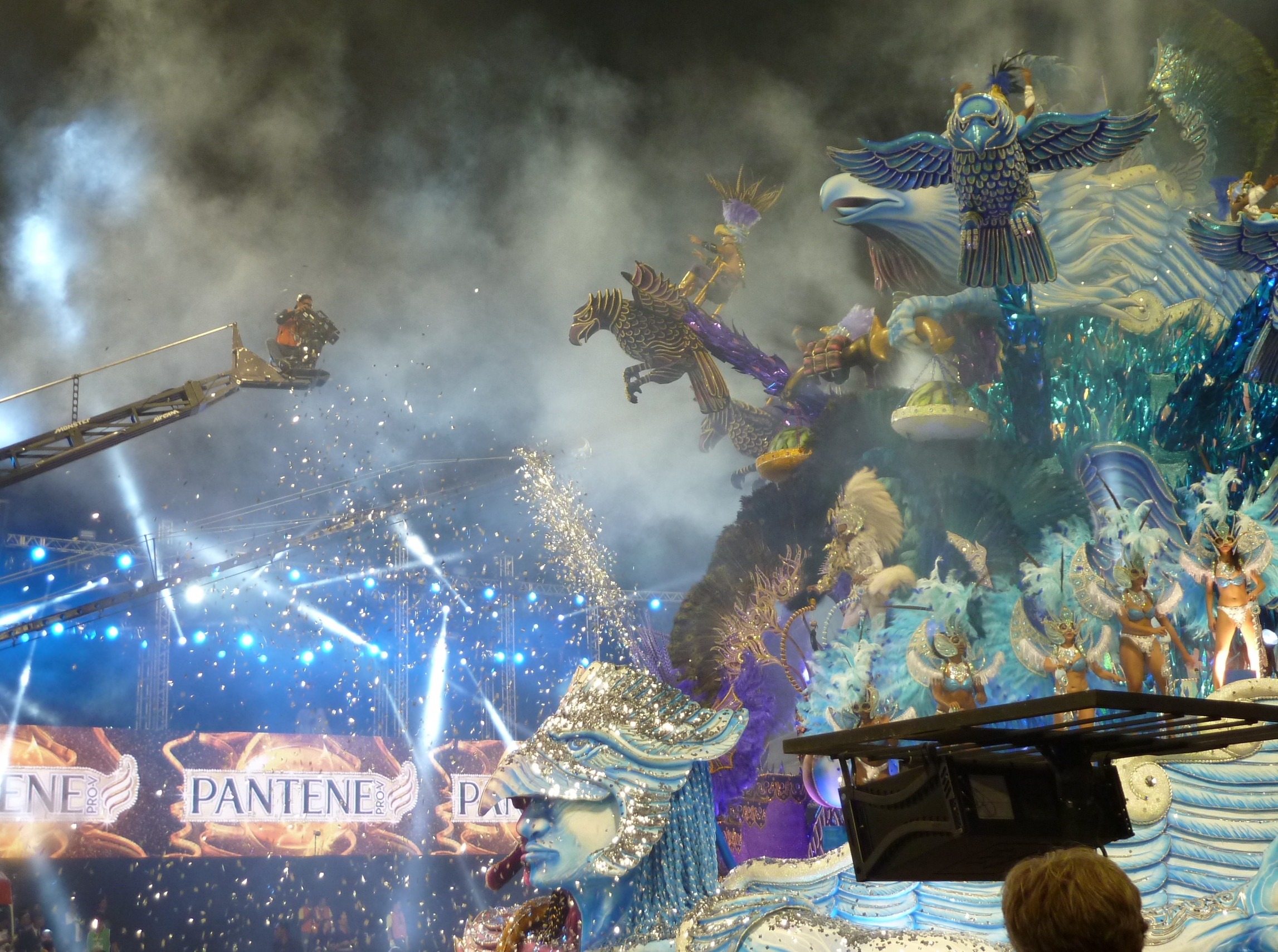
Parade of the samba school Nenê de Vila Matilde at the Anhembi Sambadrome during the 2013 carnival.

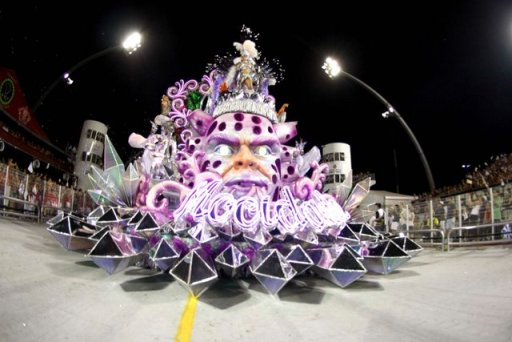
Opening float of Mocidade Alegre in 2010.

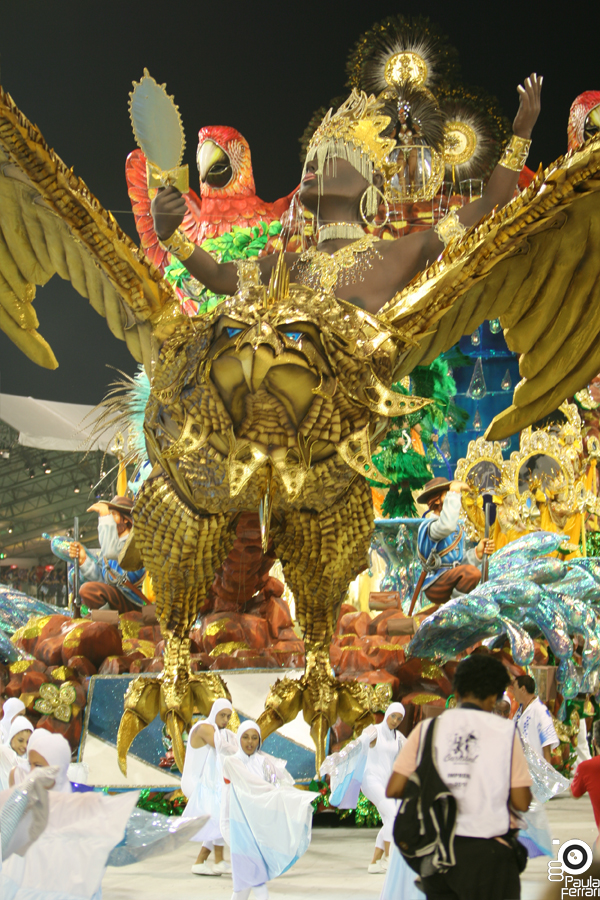
Opening float of Águia de Ouro in 2010, with the representation of an eagle, the symbol of the school.

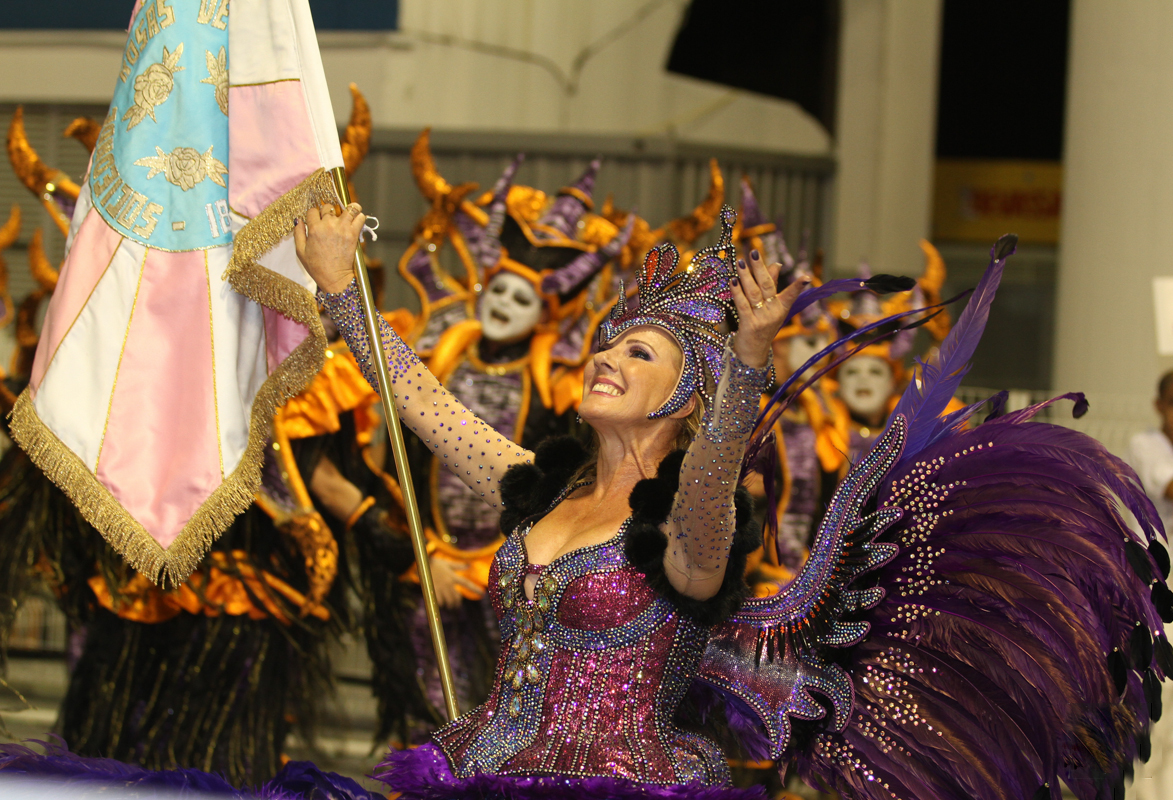
A flag bearer in a parade by Rosas de Ouro

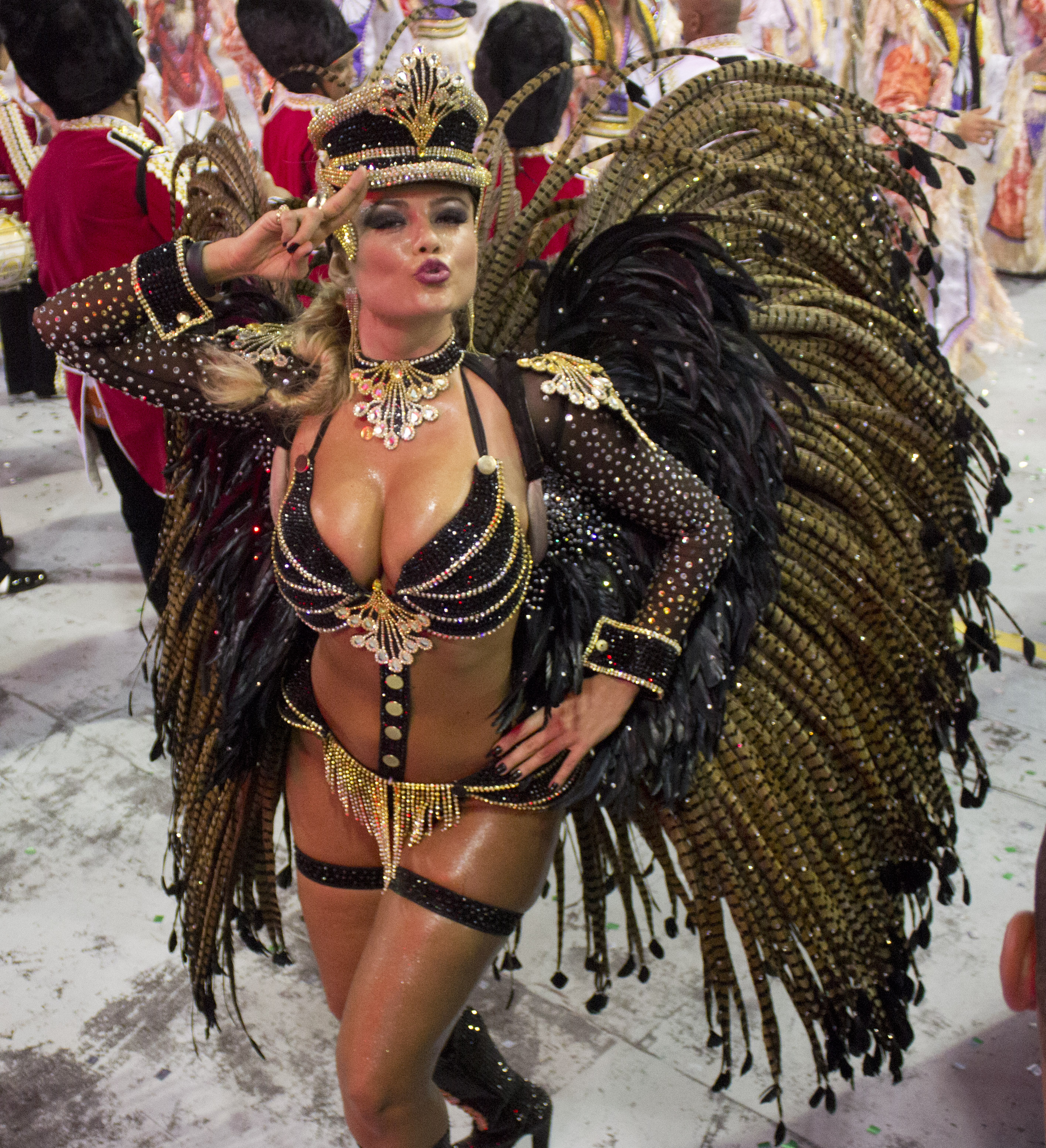
Ellen Rocche as drum queen of Rosas de Ouro.

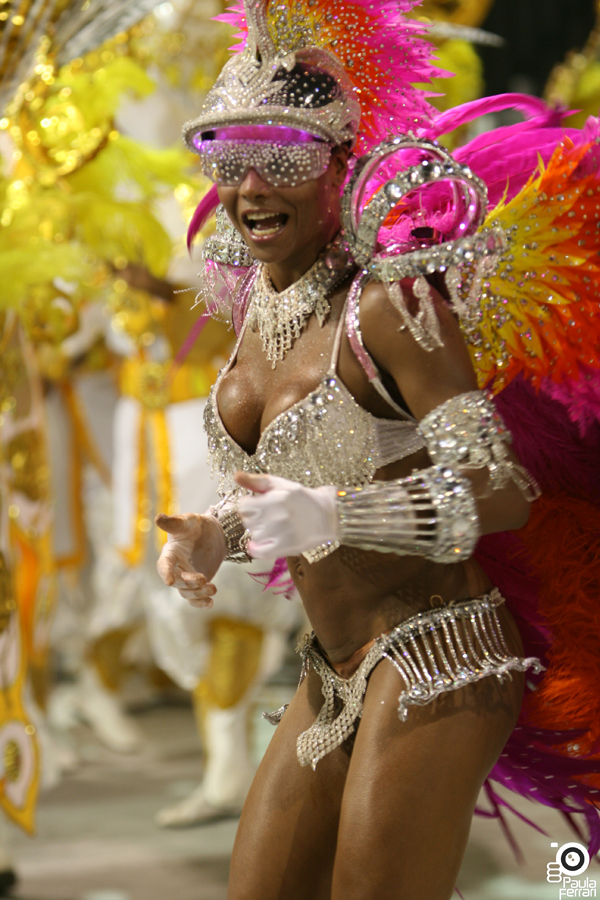
Adriana Bombom as drum queen of Tom Maior.

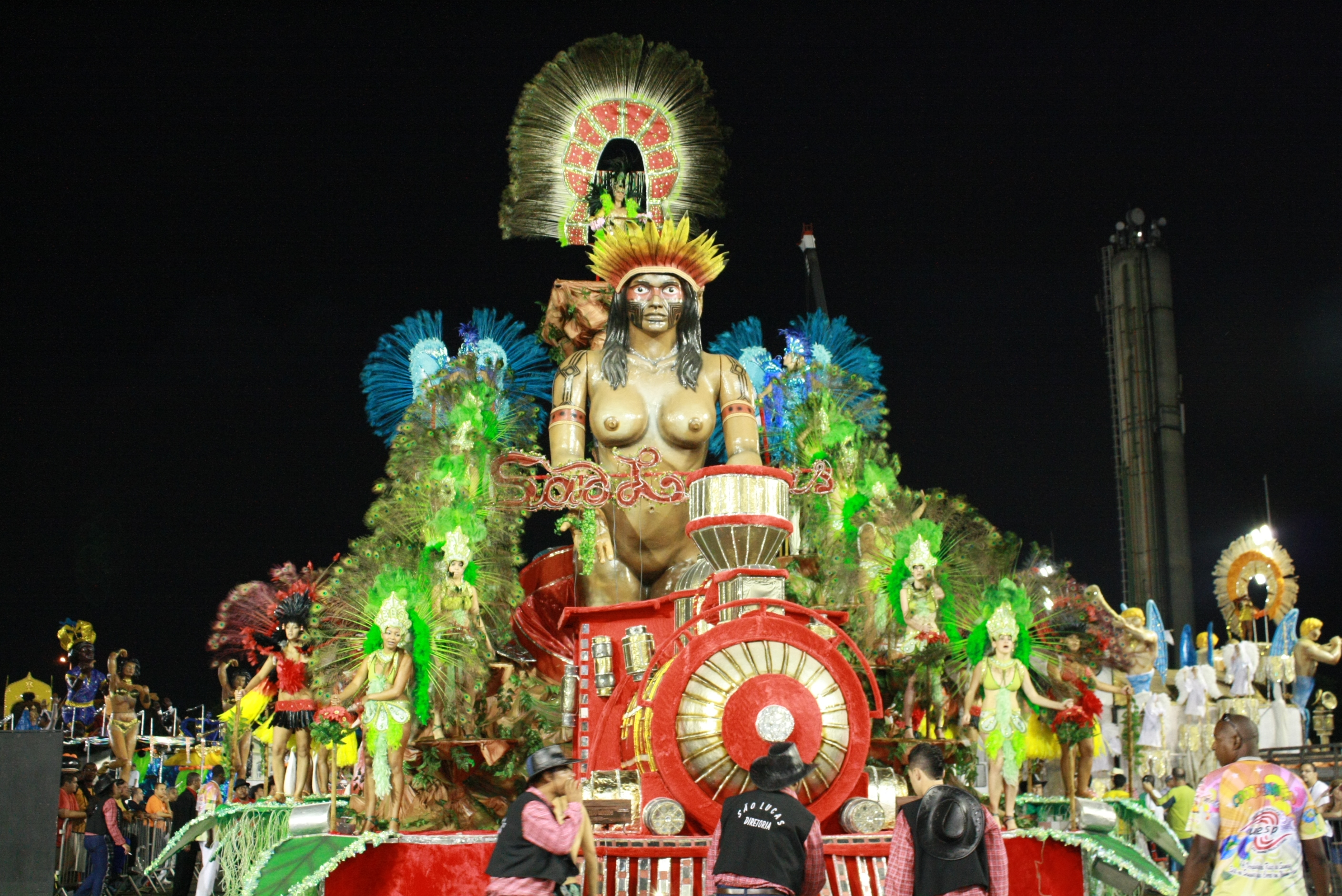
Parade of the samba school Unidos de São Lucas in 2010.

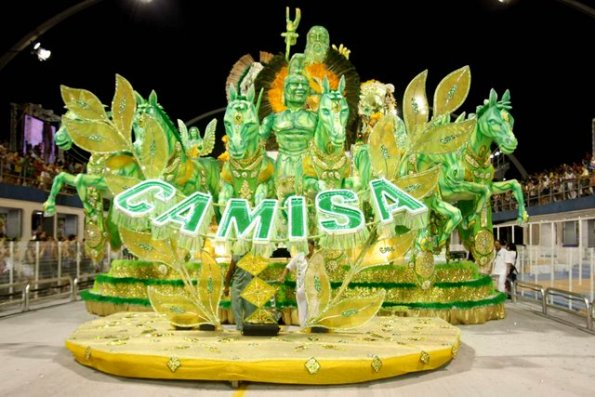
Camisa Verde e Branco float in 2010.

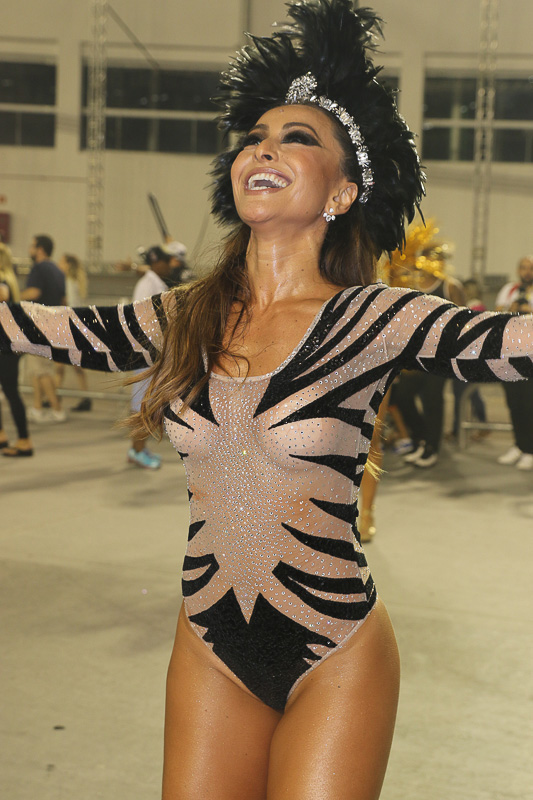
Sabrina Sato at Gaviões da Fiel's technical rehearsal.

At the 2000 Carnival, in an innovative proposal up to that point, the history of Brazil was divided into 14 parts, and each school would tell one part. The Carnival again had two champions: Vai-Vai (which achieved a three-peat) with "Vai-Vai Brasil", relating to the period 1985–2000, and X-9 Paulistana with "Quem é você? Café", relating to the period of the coffee cycle. In a fiercely contested carnival, Vai-Vai, which closed the parades on the second day, got the crowd going and with a perfect parade took the trophy once again. X-9, meanwhile, put on a technical parade, considered cold, but achieved its objective. Highlights of that year were Gaviões da Fiel and Leandro. The latter emerged as the great favorite with a surprising parade, which stirred the dream in the East Zone community of winning the much-awaited first title, but the school lost in the final categories, and the defeat led to the departure of lead singer Eliane de Lima.

The 2001 Carnival was the biggest to date. With two champions, Vai-Vai (its fourth title in a row) and the year's great highlight, Nenê. After 4 carnivals coming close, the school broke a 15-year drought. The saracura sang of light, and Nenê sang of Black participation in history, raising the grandstands at the end of the second day of parades. Highlights of the year include Leandro de Itaquera, which brought a serpent more than 100 meters long to the avenue, which harmed the school's evolution and left it only in 8th place, and Tucuruvi, which put on a parade acclaimed by critics, speaking about our carnival, but had a problem with a float at the end of the parade, which remained in the middle of the parade route, taking away the possibility of reaching a possible champions' parade. Gaviões da Fiel and Rosas put on highly praised parades according to critics, while Mocidade presented a confusing samba and failed to please.

In 2002, Gaviões da Fiel won the Carnival with the theme "Xeque Mate", with the highlight being Camisa, which won the runner-up position with a theme about the number 4, bringing the celebration to Barra Funda. Nenê, Rosas, and Leandro were also highly praised that year. X-9 lost 6 points for delay in the parade, which cost it the title, since it tied on points with Gaviões da Fiel, a penalty still lamented by the community, which proclaimed itself champion and added another star to its crest. Returning to the Special Group was a highlight of the following years, Unidos de Vila Maria.

In 2003, Gaviões da Fiel won and achieved the two-time championship, with the theme "As Cinco Deusas Encantadas na Corte do Rei Gavião", which talked about the five Brazilian regions. One of the negative highlights for that year was the tie between Águia de Ouro and Império de Casa Verde, both tied in 11th place, and it would have been necessary to have a tiebreaking criterion to define which of the two would join Barroca Zona Sul and Unidos do Peruche, since that year the regulations provided for the relegation of 3 schools (the aim of the Liga was to have only 12 schools in the Special Group by 2005). As there were no tiebreak criteria defined until then (which caused the 1999, 2000, and 2001 carnivals each to have two champions), it was decided that only two schools would go down. A few days after the final result there was another turnaround; after protests from Unidos do Peruche, which had been hit by a fire in its shed days before the parade, it was then decided that no school would be relegated in that carnival, and São Paulo thus came to have 16 samba schools in the elite group. But the great highlight of the year was Mocidade, which put on a parade that helped rewrite the history of the association in the São Paulo carnival. Speaking about water, the school from the North Zone got the crowd going and took runner-up after some years of low placements. Leandro de Itaquera generated controversy by bringing staged sex scenes in a cage on the opening float. Camisa Verde was also a highlight with a major parade that drove the grandstands wild.

In 2004, a surprise: Império de Casa Verde, with its theme "O Novo Espelho de Narciso. Um Delírio Sobre os Heróis da Mitologia Paulistana", achieved an impressive third place, ahead of traditional schools and favorites that year, such as 4th-placed Nenê and 5th-placed Rosas. Gaviões da Fiel achieved an unprecedented feat: being relegated after a two-time championship, because of one of the most tragic episodes of the São Paulo carnival, a frightening float breakage. Vai-Vai also suffered a major blow and lost positions, finishing in an inexplicable 11th place. The winner was Mocidade Alegre, speaking about São Paulo (a single-theme subject), with the theme "Do Além-mar à Terra da Garoa… Salve esta gente boa.", one of the parades considered most acclaimed in history by the public and critics. Another highlight was Imperador do Ipiranga, which had a samba considered one of the best in the São Paulo carnival up to that point.

In 2005, a year of surprises, Império de Casa Verde, with the theme "Brasil: Se Deus é por nós, quem será contra nós", which spoke about the end of the world but with some hope, gave the school its first and unexpected title in the São Paulo carnival. It stirred controversy because of an alleged "apology to crime", when one of its floats had a sculpture of the gambling boss and school sponsor Francisco Plumari Júnior, better known as Chico Ronda, who had died the year before. Another surprise came from Rosas de Ouro, which was one of that year's great highlights. Presenting "Mar de Rosas", one of the great parades in the city's carnival, the school inexplicably endured 7th place. Vila Maria was also a highlight and surprise with its first great parade in the Special Group. Mocidade moved people but did not win, speaking about Clara Nunes. Another surprise came from Nenê, which, also seen as a favorite, took only 9th place, the worst placement in the school's history up to that point. But the biggest surprise came from Bela Vista. Vai-Vai, which came out as the clear favorite for the title (alongside Rosas), spoke about immortality. The school from Bixiga swept the public along but ended up with fifth place, which caused outrage in its community, which refused to parade in the champions' parade. The results that year caused a fight between the presidents of Império and Vai-Vai at the end of the scoring. Relegated were the two schools from the South Zone: Imperador do Ipiranga, which had a broken float, and Barroca, which, because of a flaw in evolution, harmed an otherwise fine performance in the year that launched the youngest battery master up to then, Thiago Praxedes, aged 21.

In 2006, Império won back-to-back titles with the theme "Do Boi Místico ao Boi Real – De Garcia D'Ávila ao Nelore – O Boi que come capim – A Saga pecuária do Brasil para o Mundo". The title was contested by many associations and critics, since even a Portuguese-language mistake in the samba-enredo that scored 30 was found. Vai-Vai once again raised the crowd and took runner-up with the theme "São Vicente. Aqui começou o Brasil". Mocidade Alegre moved people, was favored, but finished third. The highlight for the school that year was drum queen Nani Moreira, famous throughout Brazil for her performances, who suffered a pyrotechnic accident when her costume caught fire on the avenue and she suffered severe burns, but continued dancing samba until the end. Nenê, which had promised grand floats, had weight problems, and the sequential breaking of 4 floats led the school to 11th place. To reduce the number of schools for the following year, the Liga decided to relegate 4 schools, among them 3 major ones, Leandro, Camisa, and Gaviões da Fiel, as well as Acadêmicos do Tatuapé. Leandro presented a samba considered one of the best, but staged a middling parade and in a fiercely contested carnival ended up going down. Traditional Camisa moved the public speaking about wine, but received an 8.5 for percussion, which ended up relegating the school. Gaviões da Fiel was relegated again, and again in last place. Mancha Verde paraded alone in the group of sports samba schools, being champion and the only one of the kind because Gaviões da Fiel obtained in court the right to leave that group and compete for the title with the other associations, but the green-and-white school put on one of the most moving parades of the Sambadrome era.

In 2007, the two-time champion Império staged a triumphant parade with the theme "Glórias e Conquistas – A Força do Império está no salto do Tigre", betting on luxury and gigantism; the school was considered the overwhelming favorite for the title of the year, but ended up with fifth place. Unidos de Vila Maria achieved the best result in its entire history: an impressive 2nd place with the theme "Vila Maria: Canta, Encanta com a minha história… Cubatão a rainha das serras". With a parade that moved the public and won over critics, Vila lost by little. The winner was Mocidade, with the theme "Posso ser Inocente, Debochado e Irreverente… Afinal, Sou o Riso Dessa Gente", surprising most critics. A major highlight that year was Águia de Ouro, which had been putting on good parades previously, but reached its apex in 2007. Speaking about handicrafts, the school from Pompeia got the grandstands going in a way never seen in the 2000s, was indicated as favorite by critics, and led much of the scoring, but lost in the Evolution category and ended in 4th place.

In 2008, Vai-Vai won for the thirteenth time, with the theme "Acorda Brasil! A saída é ter esperança". The association from Bela Vista drove the whole public wild, which responded with an emotional and spontaneous choreography in the grandstands. Another favorite was Vila Maria, which, like Império the previous year, bet on gigantism, bringing the largest float in the history of the Brazilian carnival. With great luxury and an infectious samba, Vila won over the public, but took only third place with the theme "Irashai-Mase, milênios de cultura e sabedoria no centenário da imigração japonesa". Mocidade won runner-up, returning to the theme of the São Paulo city, and Tom Maior had its best result, 5th place, with the same theme. Rosas de Ouro also had favorite status, speaking about perfume; with great luxury and audience interaction, the school secured a place in the champions' parade.

Gaviões da Fiel put on a terrible parade, considered by critics worse than those of 2004 and 2006, but got the grandstands going and remained in the Special Group. Águia de Ouro suffered from the breaking of a float and ended up relegated. The expected return of Camisa disappointed, and the school ended up relegated for the 3rd time in its history. Some samba schools felt pressured by the unexpected result generated by the dropped scores in the counting, alleging that without that criterion the classification result would be different, and for this reason the samba schools Vai-Vai, Gaviões da Fiel, Império de Casa Verde, Pérola Negra, Mancha Verde, Imperador do Ipiranga, Unidos do Peruche, Dragões da Real, and Camisa Verde e Branco joined and created an entity parallel to the league of São Paulo samba schools, the Super-Liga.

In 2009, Mocidade won with the theme "Da chama da razão ao palco das emoções… sou a máquina, sou a vida… sou o heart pulsando forte na avenida"; with luxury and determination, the school took the trophy. Vai-Vai came with a current theme, "Mens sana et corpore sano – O Milênio da Superação", which talked about health and hygiene, but ended up in second place. Rosas de Ouro and Gaviões da Fiel achieved their best results since 2004. But the great highlights of the year were Pérola Negra and Tom Maior, schools that presented impeccable sambas, emotional parades, and visually perfect displays, but ended up in 9th and 11th place respectively. The negative highlight fell on the traditional schools: Camisa did not gain promotion to the Special Group, and Unidos do Peruche ended up in last place and went down. But the greatest shock was the relegation of one of the biggest samba schools of the Brazilian carnival, Nenê de Vila Matilde. The school from the East Zone suffered from internal problems such as fights with the carnival designer, broken floats, reversed wing order, and lack of costumes. Not even the best samba of the year, "60 anos – coração guerreiro, a grande refazenda do samba" (which spoke about the school's 60 years), and the most famous percussion section in São Paulo, which received the highest scores, were enough to keep the school up, and it competed in the 2010 carnival in the access group, for the first time in its history.

=== 2010s ===
In 2010, Rosas de Ouro was crowned champion and won its seventh title, with the theme "Cacau: um grão precioso que virou chocolate, e sem dúvida. se transformou no melhor presente!", finishing with the maximum score (270 points). A major controversy was created around the school's parade, involving the association, Rede Globo, and the chocolate brand Cacau Show, thanks to alleged merchandising that supposedly existed in the samba and in the title of the school's theme. Verses of the song and the title of the parade were changed.

Mocidade Alegre was the favorite, won the Troféu Nota 10, and also got the grandstands going with its theme about the mirror, but finished only with the runner-up position. Vai-Vai, which put on a beautiful parade at dawn on Saturday, managed to delight the public with its theme celebrating its 80 years of foundation and also World Cups, achieving 3rd place. The surprise was Mancha Verde, which with the theme "Aos Mestres com Carinho! Mancha Verde Ensina Como Criar Identidade" put on a technically perfect parade and achieved, up to then, the best placement in its history, an impressive 4th place, ahead of its sister school Gaviões das Fiel, which finished in 5th place, praising the centenary of Corinthians, and brought several club players and even the star Ronaldo in its parade. An unpleasant episode occurred during the score reading when members of the school disliked some low scores given and started a disturbance, forcing the counting to be halted for a few minutes.

Acadêmicos do Tucuruvi surprised everyone and put on the best parade in its history, being considered a title contender, but because of low scores in the evolution category, the North Zone school ended up in 8th place with the theme "São Luis do Maranhão – Um Universo de Encantos e Magias". Imperador do Ipiranga and Leandro de Itaquera were relegated. In the Access Group, the favoritism of Nenê de Vila Matilde was confirmed and the school was crowned champion, returning to the Special Group together with Unidos do Peruche. Other schools also stood out, such as Dragões da Real and Camisa Verde e Branco. The great surprise on Sunday night was Uirapuru da Mooca, which put on a parade without glamour but won over the Sambadrome with an irreverent samba and a daring percussion section, speaking about the United States.

The first day of the São Paulo Special Group samba school parade of 2011 was scheduled to begin at 11:15 p.m. on Friday, 4 March 2011. The 2011 São Paulo Special Group samba school parade took place on 4 and 5 March 2011, marking the 20th anniversary of the Anhembi Sambadrome in the north zone of the city of São Paulo. Fourteen samba schools took part, with Unidos do Peruche, Tom Maior, Tucuruvi, Rosas de Ouro (the previous year's champion), Mancha Verde, Vai-Vai, and Pérola Negra parading from Friday to Saturday, and Nenê de Vila Matilde, Águia de Ouro, Mocidade Alegre, Vila Maria, X-9 Paulistana, Gaviões da Fiel, and Império de Casa Verde parading from Saturday to Sunday, in that order. Vai-Vai, Pérola Negra, Gaviões da Fiel, and Império de Casa Verde paraded in daylight. The carnival was marked by gigantic floats, luxurious costumes, impactful sambas, themes of all kinds, and great public support, with packed grandstands that gave standing ovations to the samba schools Vai-Vai, Império de Casa Verde, Vila Maria, and Nenê de Vila Matilde. Vai-Vai delivered one of the most emotional parades in Anhembi history, getting the crowd going with its tribute to maestro João Carlos Martins and leaving the Sambadrome to shouts of "it's the champion!". Nenê brought a theme about salt: "Salis Sapientiae – Uma história do mundo". As the first to parade on the second night of Carnival, addressing the discovery of salt, salt in the Bible, salt in cooking, the school's salt wedding anniversary, and ending with a major tribute to Seu Nenê, the founder of the East Zone school. However, very serious problems with the floats, and the switching of wings because of a float that hindered the school's entrance to Anhembi, complicated matters for the school, which was relegated again to the access group. Mocidade presented the theme "Carrossel das Ilusões"; the school was the third to parade at Anhembi. As expected, the association once again innovated in the world of Carnival. It came with one of the most beautiful parades of the year, considered by many the best; however, one of the school's floats could not support the weight and ended up breaking before even entering the avenue, leaving it in 7th place, its worst placement since 2002. Tucuruvi announced that it would pay tribute to northeastern Brazilians in its theme, which earned the association threatening emails from extremists. Although criticized by some for the theme, Tucuruvi presented a beautiful carnival on the avenue, achieving an unprecedented runner-up position, the highest placement ever achieved by the school in carnival, surpassing major associations such as Mocidade Alegre and Rosas de Ouro, having finished only 0.25 points behind champion Vai-Vai, a deserved result for a school until then considered mid-sized. Rosas came with the theme "Abra-te Sésamo: a senha da sorte!", by Jorge Freitas, with the school bringing great luxury in costumes and floats with impeccable finishing, despite having recycled most of the costumes from the previous carnival. It failed in the opening commission by bringing its main choreographer dressed as a pigeon, which in the opinion of the public, critics, and even members of the school was in very poor taste, receiving four 9.75 scores; moreover, there was a lack of choreography among the commission members, who shouted to one another at every moment to indicate the positions they should take, causing the "dancers" to stop singing the samba-enredo, and this counted negatively for evolution, which received a 9.5 and a 9.75. The commission was not the main reason the school finished in 8th place in the Special Group, but more had been expected from the school, which, in the expectations of carnival lovers, was supposed to contend for a second consecutive title.

In 2012, the carnival was once again marked by gigantism and luxury, with highlights including Rosas, which honored Roberto Justus and Hungary and achieved a runner-up position; Vai-Vai spoke about women, with an opening commission of men dressed as women, and finished in 3rd place; Camisa spoke about love and even featured the official wedding on the avenue of lead singer Agnaldo Amaral on its return to the Special Group; the green-and-white school had the mission of opening the 2012 festivities. The traditional association from Barra Funda showed that it was prepared to secure its place in the elite group; however, problems in two floats and in its costumes compromised the parade, leading to low scores in several categories and thus leaving it in 14th place, falling back to the access group along with Pérola Negra. Mocidade, with the theme "Ojuobá – No Céu, os Olhos do Rei... Na Terra, a Morada dos Milagres... No Coração, Um Obá Muito Amado!", brought to the Sambadrome Jorge Amado's most important work, Tenda dos Milagres, recognized worldwide. Acclaimed by the public and very well received by the community, Mocidade presented the greatest parade in its history, in one of the most "Afro" carnivals in the school's history. It was declared champion of the 2012 Carnival after a tumultuous score reading on 21 February of that year. The school led the scoring until the last category, when a member of Império de Casa Verde invaded the organization area, where the scores were being announced, and tore up the envelopes containing the scores of the last two judges in the Opening commission category; Império itself was greatly harmed in 2013 because it did not receive the subsidy. The directors of the schools met with the Liga directors to decide whether or not the title would be awarded to Mocidade. After more than five hours it was decided that Mocidade was the champion of the 2012 Carnival.

In 2013, Águia honored the samba singer João Nogueira with the theme "Minha Missão. O Canto do Povo. João Nogueira" and put on an impeccable parade. Batucada da Pompéia once again stood out, being the only percussion section to receive the maximum score (10.00) from all the judges; however, it exceeded the parade time limit and was penalized 1.1 points, finishing in 3rd place. Without that penalty, it would have been champion of Carnival 2013 by a margin of 0.8 points over the then two-time champion Mocidade Alegre. Rosas came with the theme "Os Condutores da Alegria, Numa Fantástica Viagem aos Reinos da Folia". The theme spoke about folk festivals around the world and took a great journey to the four corners of the planet. The parade was impeccable, so much so that it was pointed to as one of the favorites for the title. The school led much of the score reading, but low scores in the Mestre-Sala e Porta-Bandeira and Theme categories caused the school to finish in 2nd place, with the same number of points as Mocidade Alegre, but losing on the tiebreaker category, Theme. Vai-Vai came talking about wine but endured 7th place, Tatuapé honored Beth Carvalho, who could not parade due to health problems, but the school remained in the elite group. Nenê opened the 2nd night of the parades and gave a beautiful and exciting performance. It tied in number of points with Gaviões da Fiel and with X-9 Paulistana. On the tiebreaker, it finished ahead of both schools, thus taking 8th place, which guaranteed its permanence in the Special Group. Dragões da Real spoke of its own symbol, the dragon, presenting the figure in various mythologies, in films such as Dragonheart, and even in the animated series Dungeons & Dragons. The parade was considered surprising by critics, surpassed Império de Casa Verde in the tiebreaker category, and gave Dragões 4th position, the best in its history. Vila Maria and Mancha Verde put on technical parades but did not please the judges and were relegated.

In 2014, Mocidade was again champion (its third consecutive title), speaking of faith, and once again innovated when the entire school knelt at the refrain: "De joelhos eu vou cantar, tenho fé de verdade vou além, na Mocidade, o samba diz amém." Rosas de Ouro took a journey through unforgettable moments that mark life; the school faced a hailstorm minutes before the parade, which harmed its parade, and ended up with its third consecutive runner-up finish. Águia de Ouro honored Dorival Caymmi, and was one of the favorites to take the title, which for it would have been unprecedented. At the end of the score reading, it achieved third place for the second consecutive time, much celebrated by the community. Vai-Vai addressed the fiftieth anniversary of the city of Paulínia. Although the school was praised for managing to develop the history of the inland city on the avenue, and was cited as a possible title contender, on the day of the score reading Vai-Vai received scores much lower than expected. It ended up in 9th place, its worst placement in 10 years. Dragões presented the theme "Um Museu de Grandes Novidades", which addressed the pop culture of the 1970s and 1980s, and put on a beautiful parade with gigantic floats, but obtained fifth place with the same score as Acadêmicos do Tucuruvi, which in the tiebreak criterion failed in harmony. Leandro opened the Friday Special Group parades with a theme that addressed football and the 2014 FIFA World Cup, and the association presented an animated samba-enredo that thrilled Anhembi; however, during its parade it was hit by a strong hailstorm, compromising various categories such as Evolution, Costume, and Percussion, which made its relegation to the access group inevitable, finishing in 14th place.

In 2015, Vai-Vai paid tribute to one of the great singers of MPB, Elis Regina. The penultimate school on the second day of the Special Group parades, it delivered an exciting parade and generated catharsis in the grandstands, with a samba-enredo containing parts of songs by Pimentinha. After a tense score reading, the school from Bela Vista remained tied with Mocidade Alegre until the last category, when it surpassed its rival by three tenths. Mocidade honored actress Marília Pêra. The title of the theme was "Nos palcos da vida, uma vida no palco... Marília". In a beautiful parade, considered one of the most luxurious in the school's history, the association entered the samba avenue like a champion, in view of the luxury and glamour of the costumes and floats; nevertheless, it finished in second place, in a very tight contest (category by category) with the samba school Vai-Vai. Rosas de Ouro brought to the avenue the theme "Depois da Tempestade.....O Encanto!", telling the stories of fairy tales in which, after facing various adversities, the ending is always happy. Even with an exciting parade and motivated to break this sequence of runner-up finishes, the association lost points in the Samba-Enredo and Mestre-Sala e Porta-Bandeira categories, guaranteeing 3rd place. Once again Mancha Verde was relegated, speaking about Palmeiras' centenary. Tom Maior brought the theme "Adrenalina" to the avenue, taking as its experience the adrenaline of overcoming the unforeseen event of the 2014 parade, when the school's opening float broke down and was towed by two forklifts until the end of the parade. Even bringing an intriguing theme, the school failed to excite and finished in 14th place. Vila Maria spoke about the history of diamonds and remained in the elite group. X-9 came with the theme "Sambando na chuva, num pé d'água ou na garoa, sou a X-9 numa boa". The idea came from a phrase by president André dos Santos during a meeting due to the difficulties caused by a storm during the 2014 parade; the association from Parada Inglesa came motivated to put on a great parade, but lost points in the Samba-Enredo, Evolution, and Costume categories, finishing in 11th place. Dragões da Real brought to the avenue the theme "Acredite Se Puder!", seeking the long-desired title. But it again ended in 5th position.

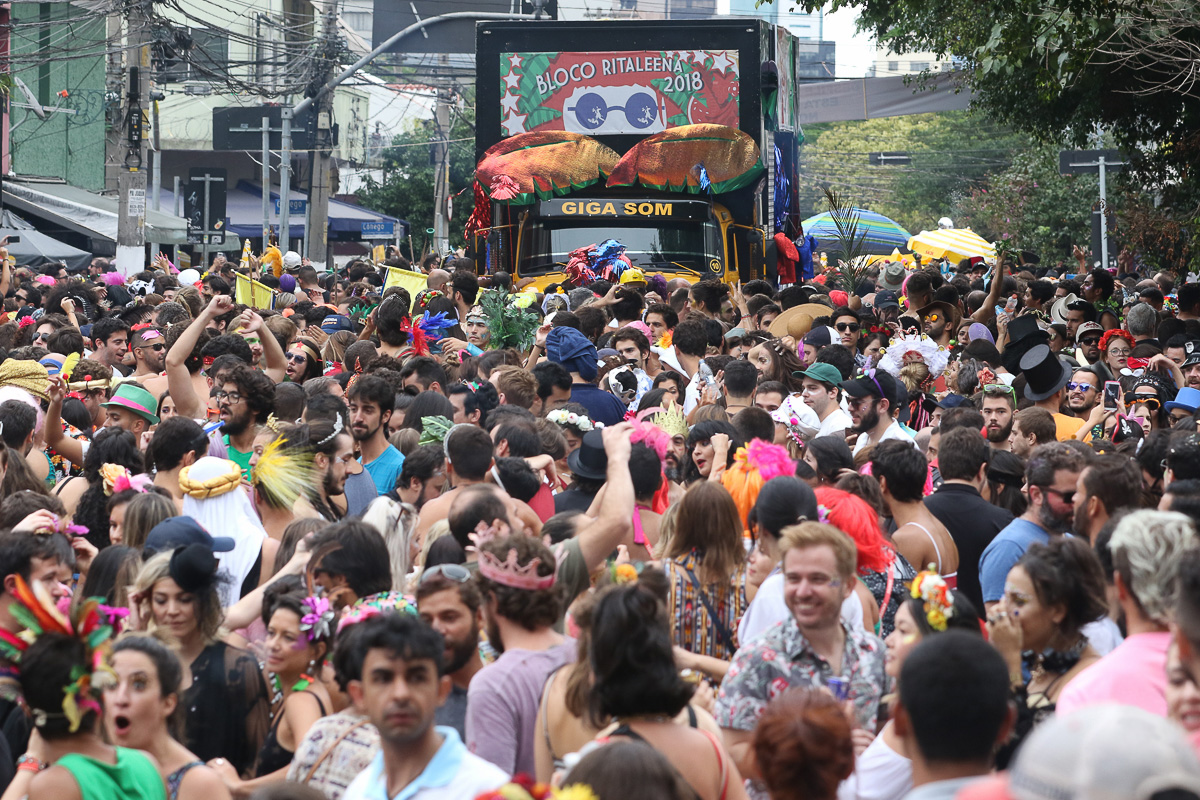
Bloco Ritaleena.

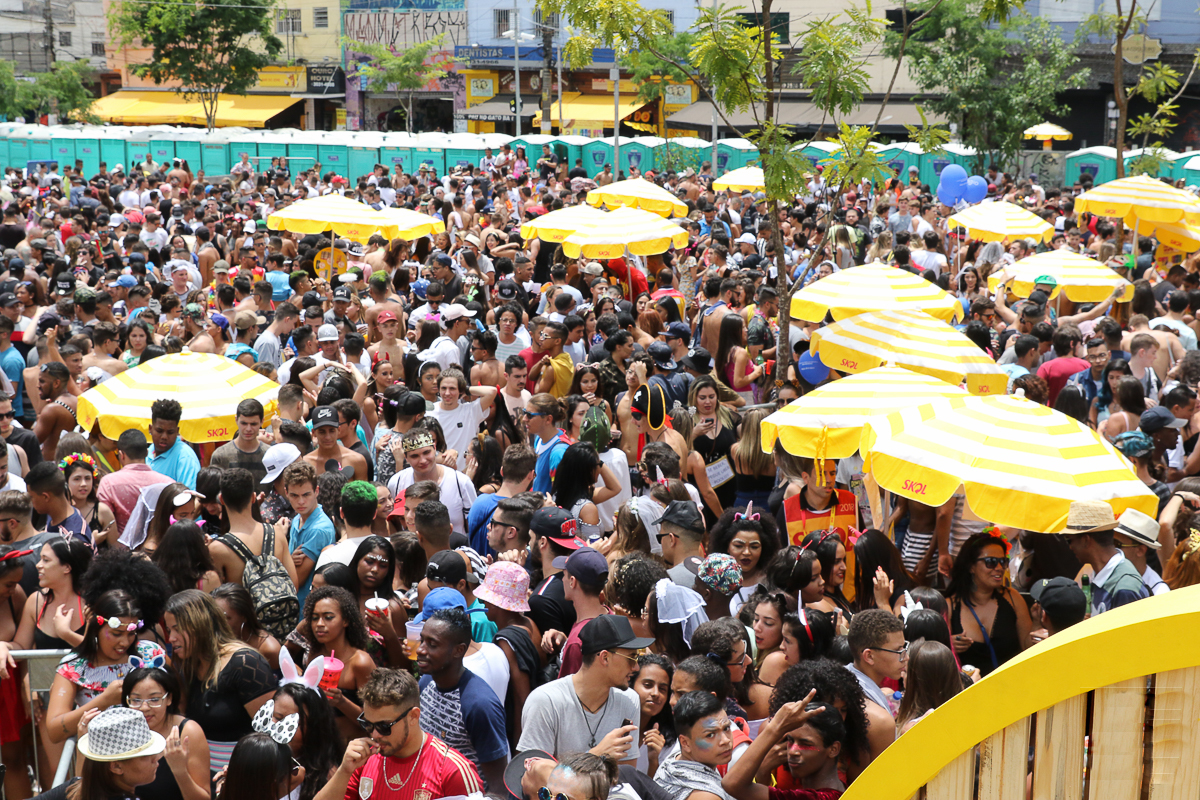
Bloco Casa Comigo.

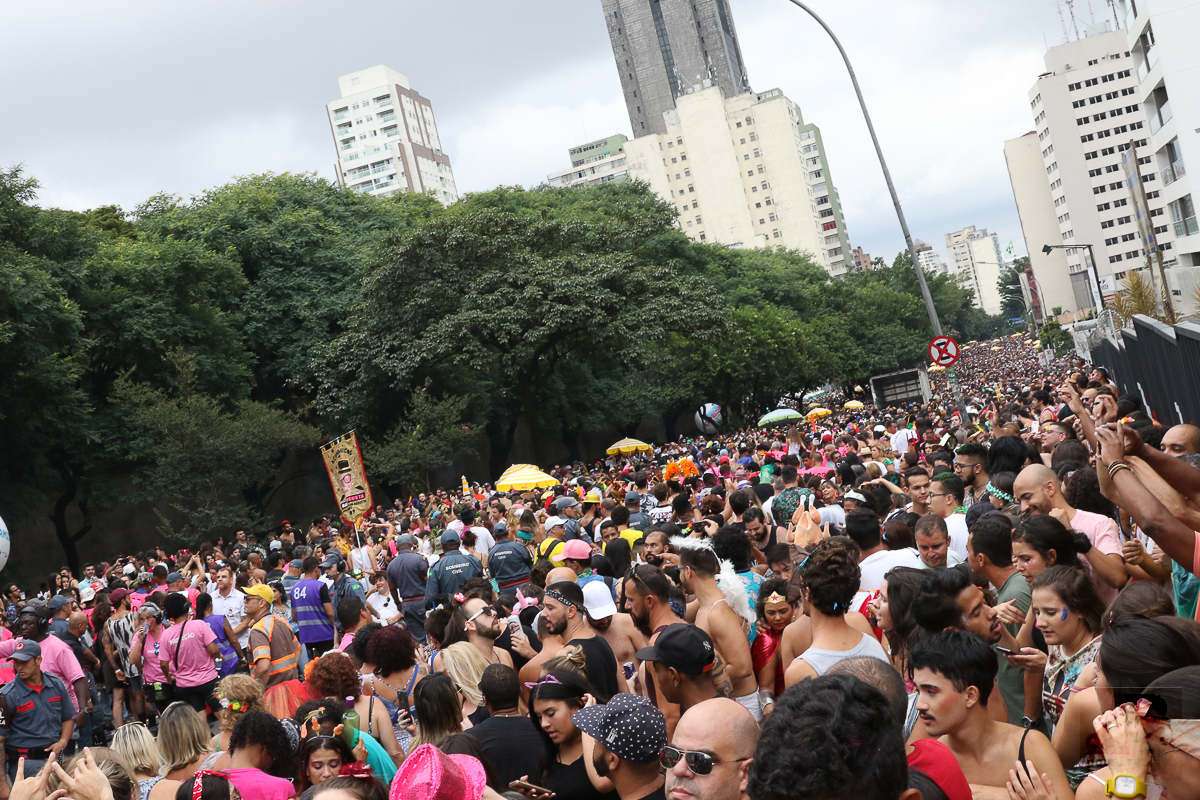
Bloco Acadêmicos do Baixo Augusta.

In 2016, the winner, for the 3rd time, was Império de Casa Verde, whose theme "Império dos Mistérios" spoke about the fascination of unraveling mysteries. The objective was to bring to the avenue things for which mankind seeks explanation, such as ancient civilizations, faith, and death itself. The school was the second to parade on the second day of the Special Group and the parade was signed by carnival designer Jorge de Freitas, formerly of Rosas de Ouro. At the front of the percussion section, Valeska Reis paraded as queen and Lívia Andrade as godmother. During the reading of the scores at the Anhembi Convention Palace, there was turmoil and Império ended up not receiving the score of the second judge in the evolution category. Following the rules, the highest score received by the school in the category had to be repeated. In second place, Acadêmicos do Tatuapé, which finished with the same score (269.1 points) as Mocidade Alegre, ended up winning on the tiebreak criteria. In fourth place, the great champion of the previous year, Vai-Vai, achieved 268.8 points, and its theme, composed by Zeca do Cavaco, Zé Carlinhos, Ronaldinho FQ, and Dodô Monteiro, spoke about France. The final result continued with Unidos de Vila Maria, which told the history of Ilhabela, in fifth. Dragões da Real, which was also affected by turmoil in the release of the scores, this time in the harmony category, and went without the score of the second judge, achieved sixth place, while Gaviões da Fiel, whose samba-enredo "É fantástico! Imagine, admire e sinta" spoke about what is fantastic, reached seventh place. In 8th was Águia de Ouro, followed by Nenê de Vila Matilde – which has already been champion 11 times – and Acadêmicos do Tucuruvi. In the final places were Rosas de Ouro, whose parade highlighted tattooing, and Unidos do Peruche, which spoke about the 100 years of samba. Pérola Negra and X-9 Paulistana were relegated to the Access Group.

In 2017, the champion school, with that year's theme being a tribute to the African country Zimbabwe, was Acadêmicos do Tatuapé, which, despite tying with Dragões da Real on total points (with 269.7 points), had its victory guaranteed by its better performance in samba-enredo; it was the first victory for the samba school from São Paulo's East Zone. Second place went to Dragões da Real, which brought as its theme a tribute to the northeastern people. Third place went to Vai-Vai, whose theme was a tribute to the "mother" of Candomblé in Brazil. Fourth place went to Império, which made peace the theme of that year's parade. Completing the top schools, Rosas de Ouro finished in fifth place, bringing as its theme togetherness. Although the samba school Águia de Ouro stood out for paying tribute to dogs and protection for all animals and for not using feathers or animal materials, it had a low score of 268.2 points and was relegated to the Access Group. Nenê da Vila Matilde took almost an hour to enter the track because it was wet, and ended up receiving a low score of 268.1 points and was also relegated to the São Paulo Carnival Access Group.

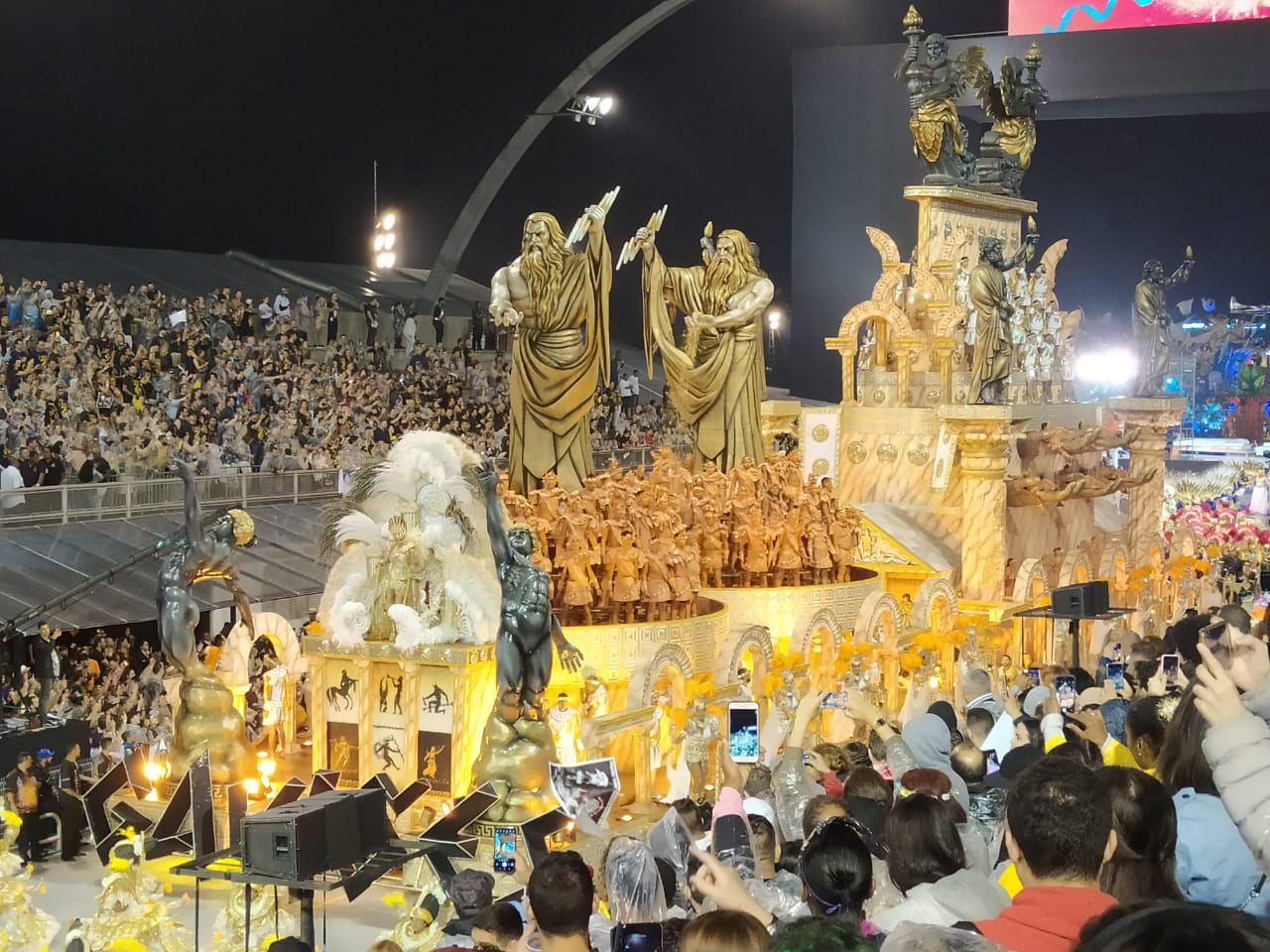
Opening float of Gaviões da Fiel in 2020, with the debut of carnival designer Paulo Barros (carnavalesco).

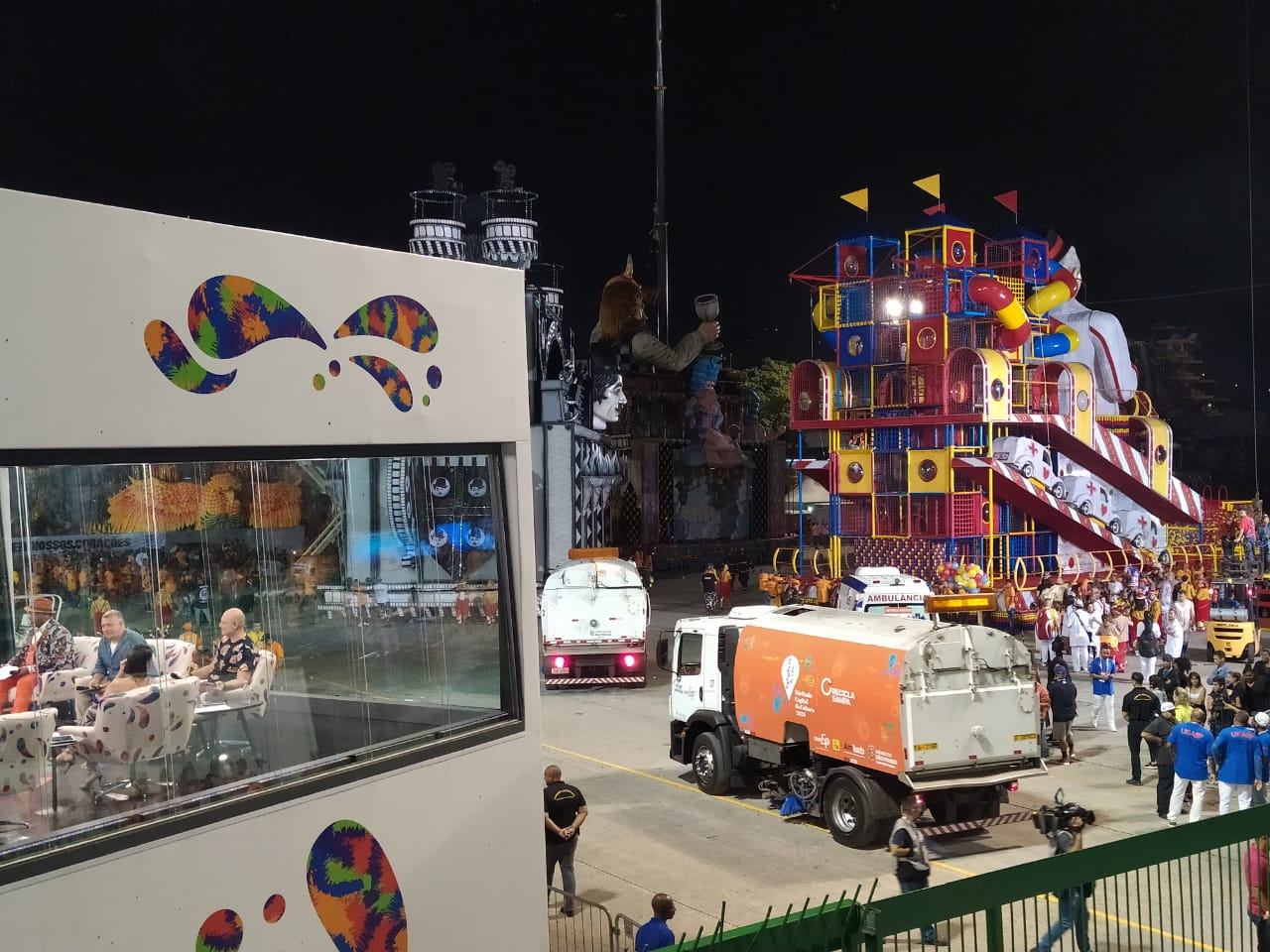
A view angle of the dispersal area of the Anhembi Sambadrome.

In 2018, Acadêmicos do Tatuapé consolidated its rise and was crowned two-time carnival champion, with the theme in tribute to the state of Maranhão, Maranhão: Os Tambores Vão Ecoar Na Terra da Encantaria, with 270 points (a perfect score). The East Zone school gained prominence after a runner-up finish and two titles, whereas in 2010 the school had been in UESP Group I (the third division of the São Paulo Carnival). After a change in management, Acadêmicos do Tatuapé began the path that culminated in these results. That year was also marked by three other schools totaling 270 points, with the tiebreak criterion responsible for defining the order: Acadêmicos do Tatuapé, Mocidade Alegre, Mancha Verde, and Tom Maior. Dragões da Real, with 269.9, completed the group of the top five placed schools, taking part in the Champions' Parade. Relegated were Unidos do Peruche (268.4) and Independente Tricolor (267.7). Águia de Ouro, also with 270, and Colorado do Brás, with 269.9, were the top two schools in Access Group I and returned to the elite group of the São Paulo Carnival.

Since the 2019 carnival, Rede Globo has broadcast the São Paulo carnival score reading only for the state of São Paulo, as well as the highlights package of the two nights of parades, both on Rede Globo itself; however, for the rest of Brazil (and the world) the highlights package is not shown, nor is the score reading broadcast via Rede Globo, being shown only (for Brazil and the world) by Globoplay and G1. Rede Globo broadcasts the Rio score reading for all of Brazil and, worldwide, the score reading of Rio de Janeiro's special group, both on Rede Globo and on G1 and Globoplay.

=== Queens of Carnival ===
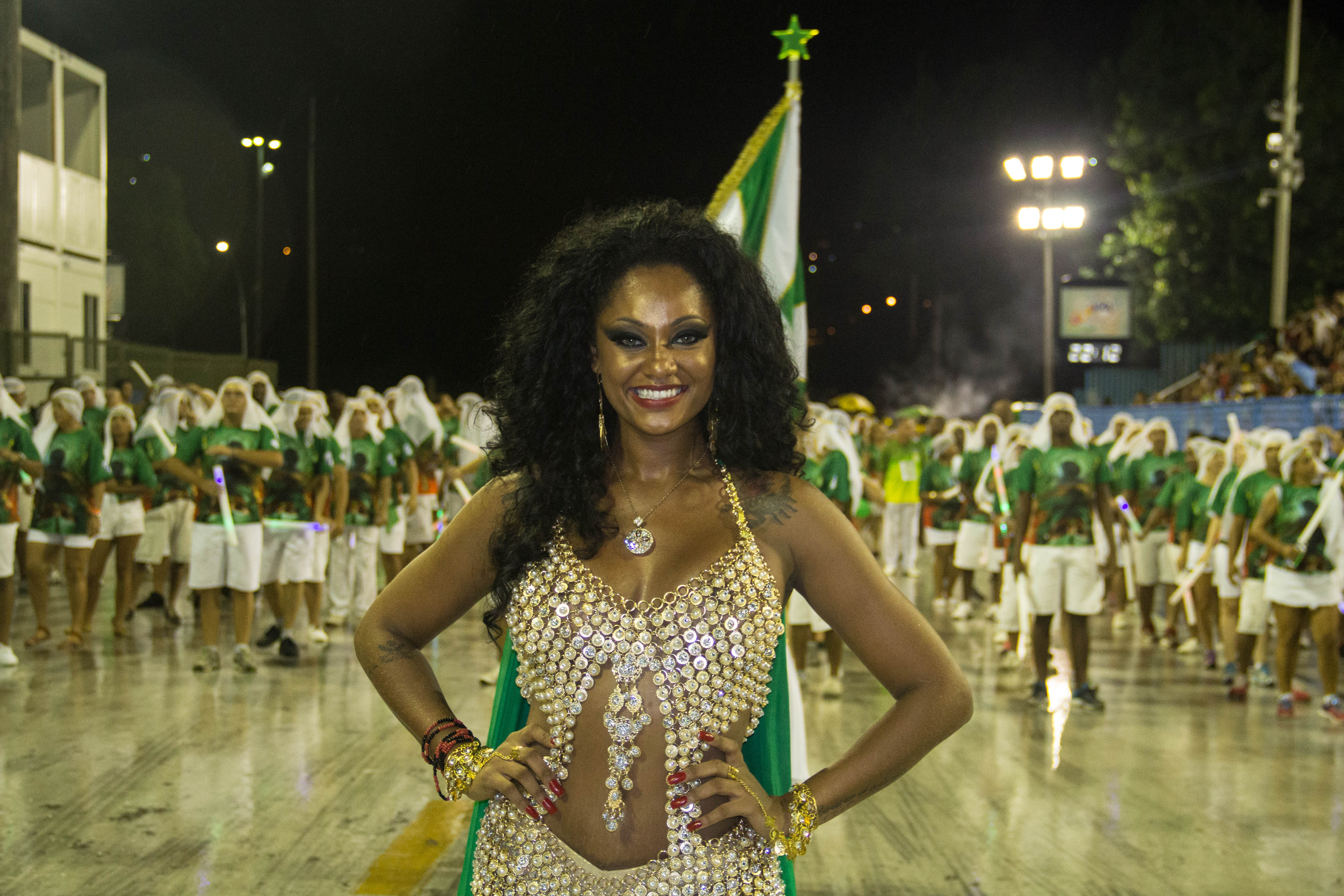
Camila Silva, the second queen of the São Paulo Carnival to be queen of the Rio de Janeiro Carnival.

Years	Queens of Carnival	1st Princess	2nd Princess	Ref
1998	Simone Sampaio			
1999	Simone Sampaio			
2002	Amanda Barbosa	Adriana Alves	Eliane dos Santos	
2003	Juliana Oliveira	Cláudia dos Santos	Ana Beatriz Godoi	
2004	Juliana Oliveira	Lylian Bragança	Érica Moraes	
2005	Magali Cruz	Débora Pires	Camila Campos	
2006	Elizabeth Almeida	Michelly Wendy	Amanda Eliseu	
2007	Roberta Kelly	Gizele de Oliveira	Mara Kelly	
2008	Valeska Reis	Thais Palmares	Renata Souza	
2009	Camila Silva	Elaine de Abreu	Mara Kelly	
2010	Déborah Caetano	Beatriz Costa	Cinthia Viana	
2011	Luana Campos	Elaine de Abreu	Lanna Moraes	
2012	Andreza Sobrinho	Cintia Cristina	Joyce Glaucia	
2013	Ariellen Dominiciano	Kimberlyn Muriel	Jéssica Cristine	
2014	Cláudia Higino	Mayara Santos	Michelle Tobias	
2015	Theba Pitylla	Katia Salles	Natacha Moura	
2016	Verônica Bolani	Tarine Lopes	Daniela Silva	
2017	Fernanda Catanoce	Mayra Barbosa	Priscila Gonçalves	
2018	Gabriela Lélis	Kimberlyn Muriel	Larissa Della Mônica	
2019	Jéssica Bueno	Bruna Maia	Acássia Nascimento	
2020	Mariana Pedro	Mariana Vasconcelos	Daniela Orcisse	
2023	Rhawane Izidoro	Nathany Piemonte	Madu Fraga	
2024	Jennifer Weida	Bruna de Jesus	Talita Soares	

== Sports Samba Schools ==
Before speaking of sports samba schools, we would have to go back to the 1930s and 1940s, when Carnival balls and blocks originating from amateur and professional football teams paraded officially through the city's neighborhoods, and even officially under the auspices of the city government. During the 1970s, carnival entities emerged that would become very successful in the future, such as Gaviões da Fiel, a multiple champion while parading in the bloc category in São Paulo. In the same decade, TUSP (Torcida Uniformizada do São Paulo) and TUP (Torcida Uniformizada do Palmeiras) also appeared, but they did not achieve the same level of success that Gaviões had already obtained.

At the end of the 1980s, as an argument, the LIGA-SP, then presided over by Leandro Alves (Seu Leandro, currently president of Leandro de Itaquera), decided to give Gaviões da Fiel a chance to become a school. In 1988 it granted direct promotion as an award, meaning that Gaviões, for being champion since its foundation, losing only in one year, would become a samba school and would gain a place in Group 1 (today the Access Group). In the 1989 Carnival, the school, with only one year of existence, confirmed its strength and was promoted to the Special Group for the 1990 Carnival.

In 1991, Mancha Verde and TUP (removed from Carnival) were invited to parade with Águia de Ouro. The Palmeiras supporters then joined the school and began helping the entity grow, to the detriment of the success of Gaviões. Mancha manipulated an attempted coup in mid-1993 in the presidency of Águia, but thanks to a maneuver by the then president Sidnei Carrioulo, the "Ala da Mancha" was expelled and thus the idea of having its own school matured.

In 1995, after Gaviões won the title, Paulo Serdan, then president of Mancha Verde, went public and announced the creation of the carnival bloc Mancha Verde. However, its birth was already threatened with the dissolution of the organized supporters' group due to a fight at Pacaembu in the fateful final of the Supercopa de Futebol Júnior. Gaviões managed to avoid its extinction with a court action, arguing that it could not be dissolved because it was no longer a supporters' group but rather a GRÊMIO RECREATIVO CULTURAL. Mancha used the same device, did not lose the carnival bloc, and since 1995 won every group it passed through, becoming a school when in 2004 it secured for the first time a place in the dreamed-of Special Group.

The Malungos Independentes began to observe the success of rival supporters' groups and found a way to return to the stadiums, creating a bloc in 1997 and granting its refoundation. It began as a bloc in the applicant slot, until 2003, when it was already a school. One week before Carnival, members who were at Anhembi entered into conflict with members from the bloc Pavilhão 9, which was parading at Anhembi that day. In fleeing from the crime, the members passed in front of the headquarters of Mancha Verde, which was holding its final rehearsal of that year, killing one member and injuring two others. In one of the saddest episodes of Brazilian Carnival, the school was expelled from the São Paulo Carnival for an indefinite period.

However, during this time several entities appeared such as Torcida Jovem do Santos, TUP, Camisa 12 and Dragões da Real.

In 2004, Mancha Verde became champion of the São Paulo Access Group, ascending to the elite division of Carnival, but in that year, surprisingly, the reigning champion Gaviões da Fiel ended up relegated. The term "sports samba school" would definitively emerge in 2006, when, with the return of Gaviões da Fiel to the main group, previously approved regulations provided for the creation of the "Special Group of Sports Samba Schools", which would include all sports schools that reached the Special Group. They would then have to compete in a separate competition, in a separate parade. Through agreements and court decisions, both schools participated in the main competition in 2006 and 2007 (in the latter year only Mancha paraded among the top schools because Gaviões da Fiel had again been relegated). Even so, LigaSP does not recognize Mancha's placements among the other 14 schools that participated in the main parade, placing it in a separate category where it competed alone and was declared a two-time champion. For 2008, the Sports Group was officially extinguished.

These events were an attempt by LigaSP to exclude from the competition the two schools linked to supporters' groups, out of fear that fights between torcidas organizadas – very common in football stadiums – could spread to the sambadrome and harm the event. To this day, however, there have been no reports of serious incidents, and the leadership of Mancha and Gaviões da Fiel maintain a good relationship.

Among all the sports samba schools, Gaviões da Fiel was champion of the Special Group, having four titles. In 1995 the school won its first title with a samba-enredo that, to this day, is sung by Carnival lovers. In 2019 Mancha-Verde won its first title and in 2022 it became two-time champion of the São Paulo Carnival.

In 2011, Dragões da Real was champion of the Access Group and secured its unprecedented participation in the 2012 Special Group parade, making three schools linked to football teams eligible to parade in the elite of the São Paulo Carnival. In 2017, Independente Tricolor finished in 2nd place in the Access Group, earning the right to participate in the Special Group of the São Paulo Carnival in 2018, thus having four schools linked to teams in the Special Group: Gaviões da Fiel, Mancha Verde, Dragões da Real and Independente Tricolor.

== Street Carnival ==
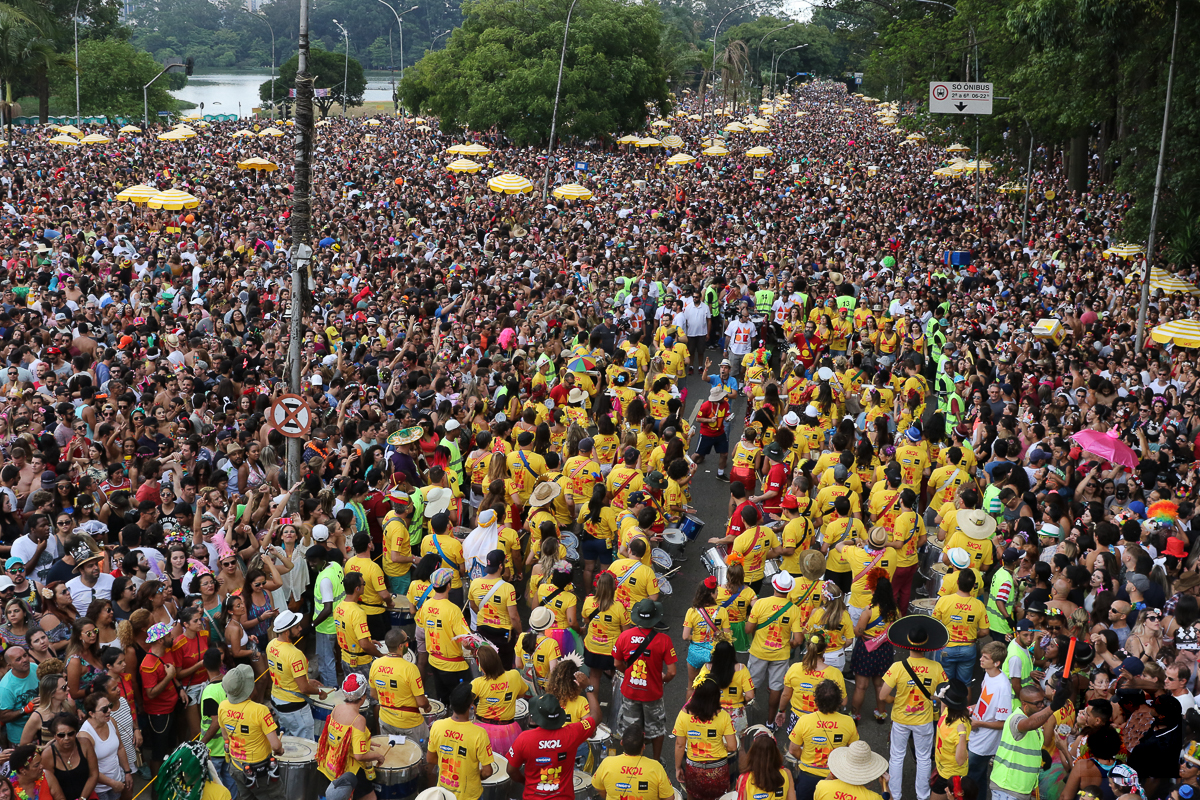
Monobloco in 2018.

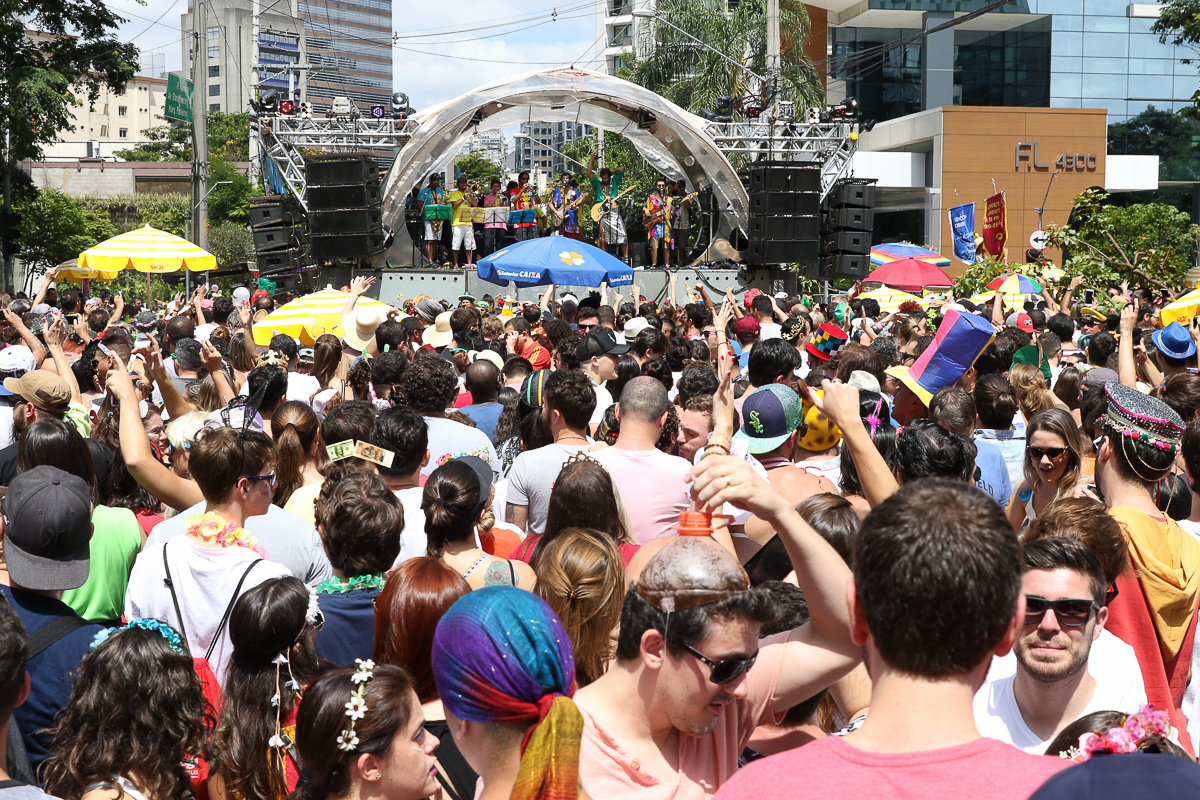
Bloco Sargento Pimenta.

Street Carnival is one of the oldest cultural manifestations of São Paulo, with the oldest record of its realization dating from a minute of the Municipal Chamber of 13 February 1604, when it was still called Entrudo. Since then it has been held in the streets of São Paulo, although provincial authorities attempted to prohibit it in 1832.

Because the entrudo consisted of throwing fruits and scented water at its participants, it became increasingly violent and was prohibited in São Paulo in 1832. However, authorities only managed to end the entrudo when they participated in organizing Carnival parades in 1856, when they took a form similar to the present one.

Street Carnival, or street blocs, in São Paulo has been growing more and more each year, bringing with it an enormous cultural, touristic and symbolic dimension, in addition to historical and artistic importance. These have become a tradition for Carnival lovers in recent years.

Street Carnival is considered any set of voluntary carnival manifestations, whether organized or not, non-profit and festive in nature, that occur in the form of "blocos", "cordões", "bands" or similar. These blocs take place in the city of São Paulo itself, in notable urban circuits such as major avenues, streets and squares, accompanied by sound trucks, bands and various percussion instruments. They have very characteristic names, bringing wordplay and striking phrases to enliven even more this festive atmosphere at this time of year, such as "Quem me viu Mentiu", "Meu Santo é Pop", among others. Options of styles and audiences were not lacking in the blocs of that year, which included blocs with electronic music, hits from the 1990s, political speeches and feminist themes.

In 2017, 391 Carnival blocs paraded in São Paulo between 17/02 and 05/03, bringing crowds to the streets to celebrate this famous time of year. Along with this, they show their evolution as a carnival manifestation. They began with carts with speakers pulled by friends from the local neighborhood, and now they have created company-like structures to receive sponsorship and thus hold street parties with sound trucks, security and professional musicians. Some followed this path only to offer a better structure for a party that had grown. Regarding growth, in 2016, according to research carried out by the "Observatório de Turismo e Eventos da SPTuris", the total audience for the street carnival estimated that the number of tourists rose from 3% to 10% of the total revelers. The research also evaluates the number of residents of São Paulo who hosted relatives and friends from outside the city in their homes during the carnival period, showing a 388% increase for those who came to enjoy the street carnival.

But some blocs already think of the festivities as a business, both on the organizational side of the bloc itself and for the street vendors who also participate. An example of the growth of this type of carnival was the bloc "Tarado ni Você", with repertoire by Caetano Veloso, which shows the diversity of musical styles at this festival. The growth of this bloc was exponential: from seven thousand in 2014 it jumped to around twenty thousand in 2015, forty thousand in 2016, and in 2017 the founders estimated that up to seventy thousand people attended the bloc. Despite the increase of blocs, many still resist this growth and seek to maintain their base as small blocs, called "bloquinhos", which do not aim to profit or grow but rather preserve something more intimate, seeking a family-oriented audience, fewer problems, or simply trying to maintain the freedom of parades through neighborhood streets.

A survey conducted by São Paulo Turismo reports that the bloquinhos obtained 200% more participants compared to 2016. The large number of revelers also brought with it many cases of theft. Police recorded almost two thousand cases of theft and robbery of cell phones in the blocs of SP, with the main locations being the Center of São Paulo and Pinheiros.

For those who thought the festivities would never end, there were several confusions and fights after blocs due to crowds remaining at the location after they ended. Police had to use stun grenades because of violations of the agreed limits for noise and occupation in residential areas, such as in the Center of São Paulo.

The blocs also stirred the large city in its public transportation, with heavy crowding and even route changes. The Companhia de Engenharia de Tráfego (CET) monitored and closed routes and surroundings of the blocs, preventing automobile traffic and living up to the name "street carnival".

With enormous demand, blocs had to seek sponsorship, which was the case of the bloc "Tô de Bowie", established in downtown São Paulo and bringing together more than forty thousand participants.

The most evident case of sponsorship is beer brands, which are present in all street blocs; in return they can advertise their brand on the bloc shirts or even on the sound trucks.

The most famous carnival bloc in São Paulo, in 2017, was Bloco Casa Comigo, located at Largo da Batata. In this bloc there were more than 700,000 revelers, and its main objective was to encourage all people, regardless of their sexual choices, to have the right to say "Marry me?". However, the number of people wearing wedding costumes or even the famous veil was notable.

The season of joy and festivities ended with axé singer Daniela Mercury, who led a crowd of around fifty thousand revelers from Rua da Consolação to Av. Paulista to jump and enjoy the celebration with a sound truck in the bloc Pipoca da Rainha. The singer performed her musical hits and delighted residents of São Paulo and tourists who fell in love with the city's street carnival. Despite this, as reported above, thefts, fights and confusion were not absent. A negative point in this regard but positive for the "Apito Contra o Assédio" action that took place during the bloc, in which about eighteen thousand whistles were distributed by the sponsor of this carnival so that women could react against sexual harassment.
