= 30 Anos de Chaves =

- 30 Anos de Chaves
- Genre: Sitcom
- Based on: El Chavo del Ocho by Roberto Gómez Bolaños
- Directed by: Marcelo de Nóbrega
- Starring: Renê Loureiro; Alexandre Porpetone; Marlei Cevada; Felipe Levoto; Ratinho; Christina Rocha; Lívia Andrade; Zé Américo; Carlos Alberto de Nóbrega; Celso Portiolli
- Country of origin: Brazil
- Original language: Portuguese
- No. of seasons: 1
- No. of episodes: 3

Production
- Running time: 27 minutes

Original release
- Network: SBT
- Release: August 19 – December 28, 2011

Related
- El Chavo del Ocho (original series)

30 Anos de Chaves (English: 30 Years of El Chavo, Spanish: 30 Años de El Chavo) is a Brazilian TV special celebrating the 30th anniversary of the Mexican TV series El Chavo del Ocho created by Roberto Gómez Bolaños. This special was aired on SBT on August 19, 2011. In opposition to the title, the special marks the 30th anniversary of the broadcaster of the show.

== Production ==
Filming started and wrapped on August 12, 2011 in a replica of the original scenario. Initially, interviewer Marília Gabriela was cast as Mrs. Worthmore, but due to agenda conflicts, she was replaced by actress Lívia Andrade.

== Plot ==
The episode is a remake of the episode Letter Confusion, in which Professor Girafalde arrives in the neighborhood and says to Mrs. Worthmore that had written his feelings for her in a pink paper, but let it fall out of his pocket. Chilindrina finds it later. Coming back home, Mr. Raymond asks Chilindrina to go to the butchery and gives her a white paper with what she needs to buy. She reads the pink paper thinking her father wrote a love letter to the butcher. Unwilling to go, she asks Chavo to go instead of her, saying that her father would give him a ham sandwich. After that, Quico looks for the letter that Professor Girafalde have written to Mrs. Worthmore and Chilindrina gives him the white paper, with the list her father wrote for the butcher.

== Cast ==
- Renê Loureiro as Chavo/Chaves (1st special)
- Alexandre Porpetone as Chavo/Chaves (2nd special)
- Marlei Cevada as Chilindrina/Chiquinha
- Felipe Levoto as Mr. Raymond/Seu Madruga
- Ratinho as Mr. Bellarge/Seu Barriga
- Christina Rocha as Mrs. Pinster/Dona Clotilde
- Lívia Andrade as Mrs. Worthmore/Dona Florinda
- Zé Américo as Quico
- Carlos Alberto de Nóbrega as Professor Girafalde/Girafales (1st special)
- Celso Portiolli as Professor Girafalde/Girafales (2nd special)
