= Lívia Andrade =

Brazilian model

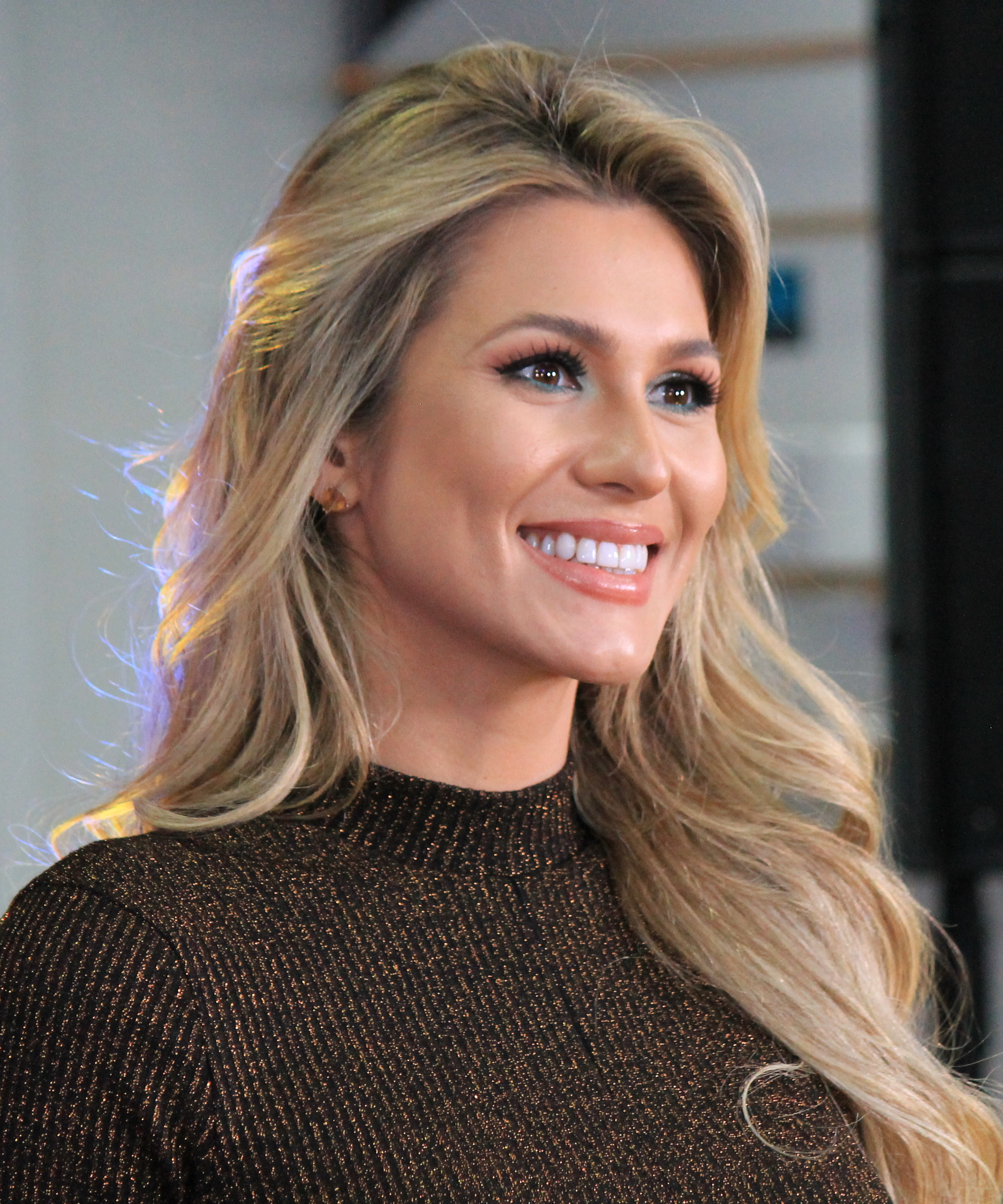
- Andrade in 2020
- Born: 20 June 1983 (age 43); São Paulo, Brazil
- Occupations: Television presenter; actress; model; dancer; radio personality; businesswoman
- Years active: 1997–present
- Spouses: Fagnani Nilton Júnior (m. 2004; div. 2014) Roberto Villa Real Júnior (m. 2016; div. 2020)

Lívia Regina Sórgia de Andrade (born 20 June 1983) is a Brazilian television presenter, actress, model, dancer, radio personality, and businesswoman.

She gained prominence for her participation in the Programa Silvio Santos from 2008 to 2020. As an actress, she played various roles in the comedy sketch show A Praça é Nossa, starred in the television special 30 Anos de Chaves and telenovelas Corações Feridos and Carrossel.

== Early life ==
Andrade was born and raised in Casa Verde, São Paulo, Brazil. Her father was a business administrator who died when she was a child and her mother is a banker. She has a brother.

Andrade has a degree in radio and television.

== Career ==
=== Career beginnings ===
Andrade started her career at age of 9 or 10 as a runway and advertising model. In 1997, she made her television debut on the SBT game show Fantasia as a Fantasia Girl dancer. In 1998, she joined the "Mallandrinhas" group of dancers in the comedy show Festa do Mallandro, hosted by Sérgio Mallandro. With the group she also appeared in various segments, such as sketches and pranks, and sang for two funk carioca albums.

When Andrade was 18, she posed nude for the September 2001 issue of Playboy. Around this time she traveled to Israel for modeling. In 2003, she posed nude for the August issue of Sexy.

Andrade was an owner of a clothing store. In 2008, Andrade founded Santa Sereia, a religious goods store.

== Samba schools presence ==
Andrade came to wider attention for many years due her presence as queen or muse of many samba schools in Rio de Janeiro and São Paulo.

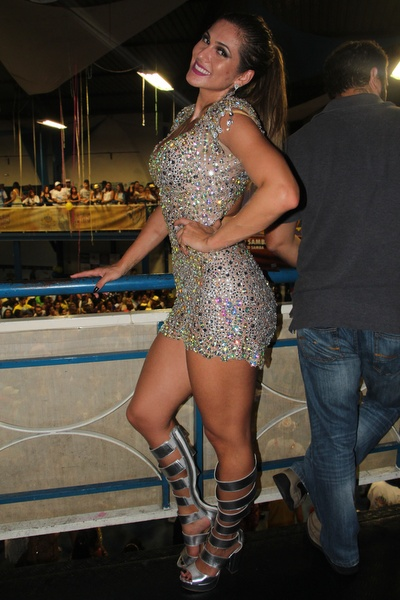
Queen of Império da Casa Verde in 2016 (Rehearsal)

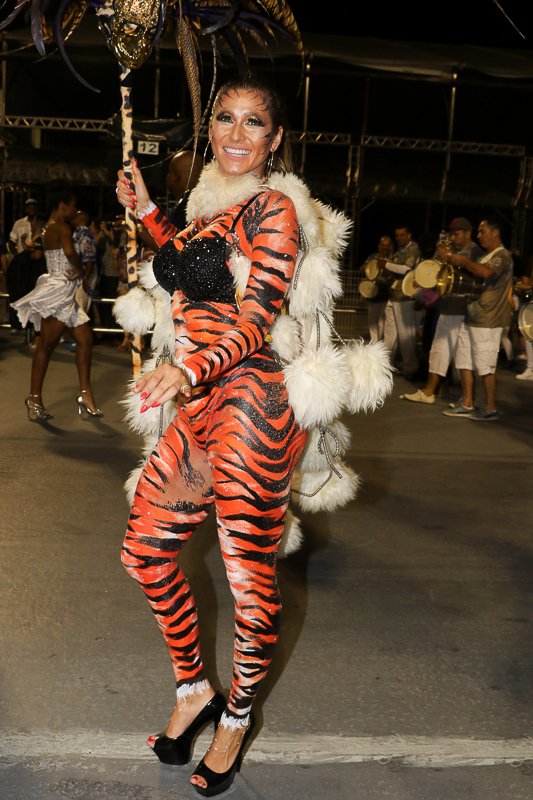
Queen of Império da Casa Verde in 2016 (Rehearsal)

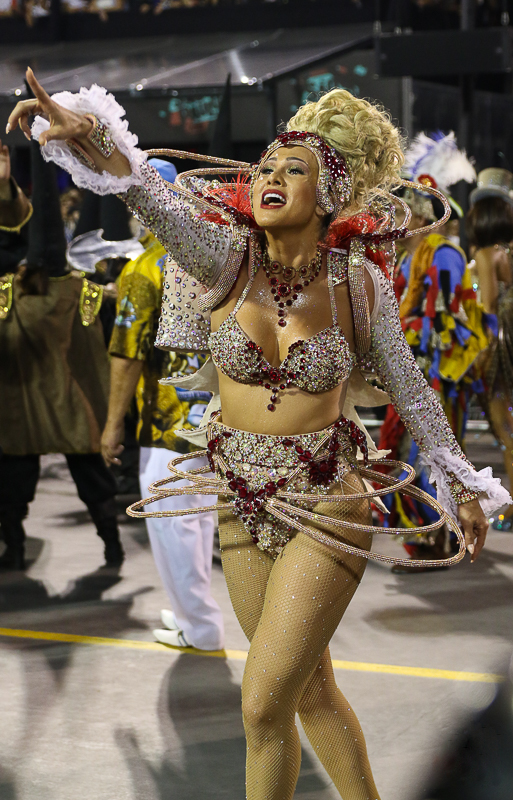
Queen of Império da Casa Verde in 2018 (Parade)

== Filmography ==
=== Television ===
Year	Title	Role
1997–98	Fantasia	Cast member
1998–02	Festa do Mallandro	Cast member
2004–10	A Praça é Nossa	Dona Dadá / Maria dos Prazeres / Isabé / Others
2008–20	Programa Silvio Santos	As herself
2009	Vende-se um Véu de Noiva	Luciana
2010	Uma Rosa com Amor	Journalist
2011	30 Anos de Chaves	Dona Florinda
2011	Chaves: Especial de Natal	Dona Florinda
2011	Chaves: Especial de Ano Novo	Dona Florinda
2012	Corações Feridos	Janaína Correia
2012–13	Carrossel	Ms. Suzana Bustamante
2014	Chiquititas	Bárbara
2014	É Natal, Mallandro!	Mrs. Claus
2014	Pousada do Ratinho	Guest of 71
2016	Carrossel (the Animated Series)	Ms. Suzana Bustamante (voice)
2017	Bake Off SBT	Herself
2019	Bake Off SBT 3	Herself
2022–present	Domingão com Huck	Comentarist

==== As hostess ====
Year	Title
2011	Eliana
2013–20	Teleton Brasil
2014–16	SBT Folia
2014	Arena SBT
2017–20	Fofocalizando
2020	Triturando
2020	O Próximo Nº1 VillaMix

=== Film ===
Year	Title	Role
2010	Natasha: O Anjo da Morte	Carmem Delarua
2016	Dumbo & Jumbo 2	Amália

== Discography ==
=== Albums ===
Year	Title	Formats
2001	Baille Funk do Mallandro - As Mallandrinhas	CD
2001	As Mallandrinhas - Sexy Demais	CD
2013	Liberta	Radio, Web

=== Soundtrack albums ===
Year	Title	Formats
2013	Carrossel Remixes Vol. 3	CD, digital download
2014	Chiquititas Vídeo Hits Volume 3	DVD

== Theater ==
Year	Title	Role	Directed by
2006	Aconteceu com Shirley Taylor	Shirley Taylor	Fafy Siqueira
2007	Um Avião em Minha Cama	Eleni	Cláudio Cunha
2007	O Riso no Divã		Cláudio Cunha
2007	Acredite, Um Espírito Baixou em Mim	Normanda	Sandra Pêra

== Radio ==
Year	Title	Role
2013-20	Liberta - Consultório Sentimental	Herself (host)

== Magazines ==
Among the countless magazine covers, Andrade appeared in the following men's magazines:

- 2001 - September edition of Playboy
- 2003 - August edition of Sexy
