= Carlos Alberto de Nóbrega =

Brazilian television host, writer, and comedian

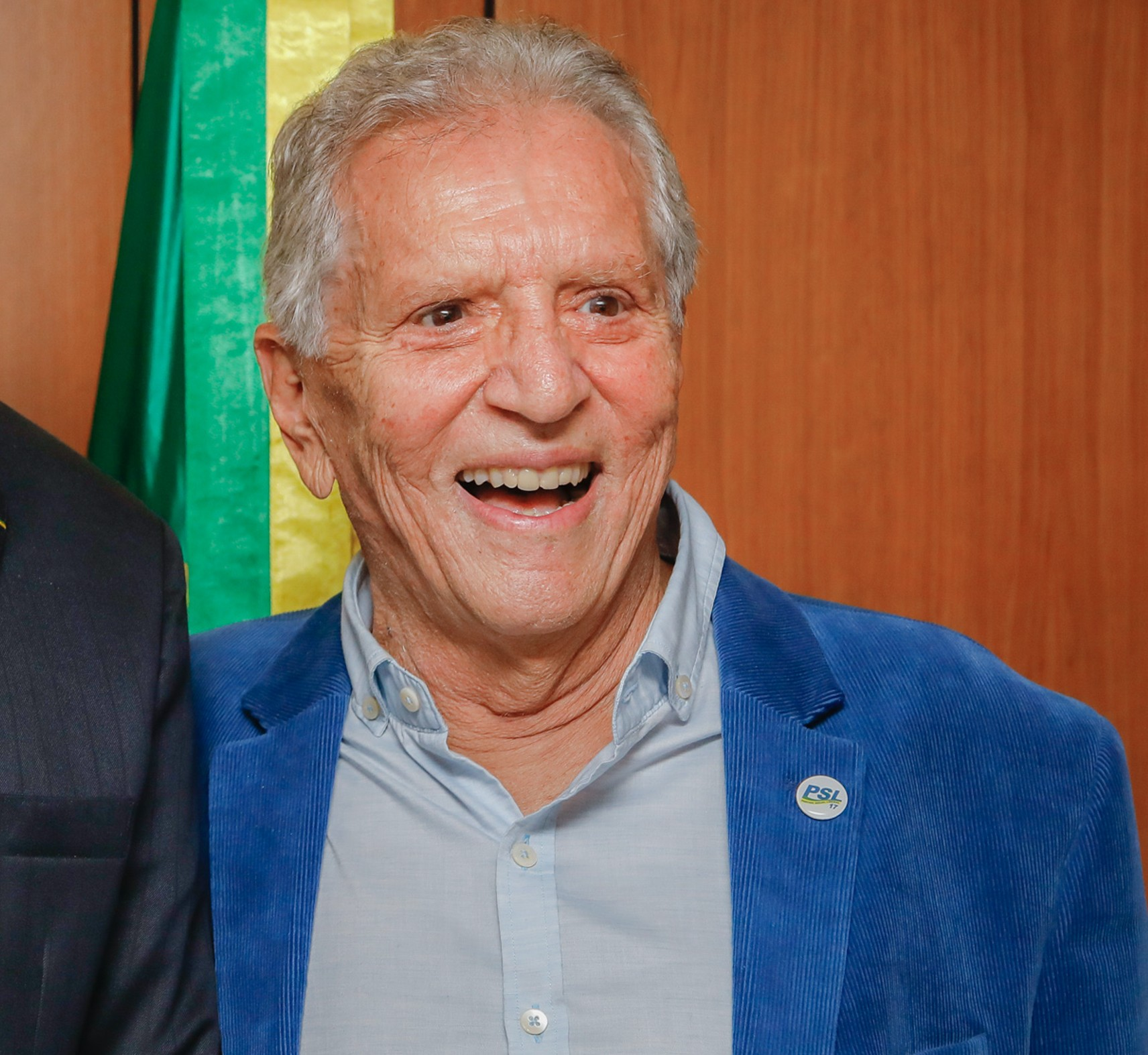
- Born: March 12, 1936 (age 89); Niterói, Rio de Janeiro, Brazil
- Occupation: Comedian, actor, screenwriter, television presenter

Carlos Alberto de Nóbrega (born March 12, 1936) is a Brazilian comedian, television host, scriptwriter, producer, executive director, actor, writer and lawyer, son of fellow comedian Manuel de Nóbrega. He was a scriptwriter for comedy shows on TV Paulista, TV Rio and RecordTV. He wrote dozens of programs, including Família Trapo and A Praça da Alegria, and was also the writer for Os Trapalhões. Since 1987, he presents the humor show A Praça é Nossa, on SBT.

He was born in Niterói, in the metropolitan area of Rio de Janeiro. Besides being a comedian, he has a law degree from the Federal University of Rio de Janeiro, but briefly became a lawyer. He is also the author of the book A Luz Que Não Se Apaga, about his father, Manuel de Nóbrega. He also wrote an autobiography, "Essas Coisas só Acontecem Comigo", in which he recounts his personal experiences and his career in television.

== Filmography ==
=== Radio ===
Year	Title	Role	Channel
1954	Programa Manuel de Nóbrega	Screenwriter	Rádio Nacional São Paulo

=== Television ===
Year	Title	Role	Channel
1956	Zilomag Show	Screenwriter	TV Paulista
1956	Golias Show	Screenwriter	TV Paulista
1956	Espetáculo Tamoyo	Screenwriter	TV Paulista
1956 - 1957	Praça da Alegria	Comedian	TV Paulista
1957	A Escolinha do Golias	Screenwriter	TV Paulista
1958	Rio Te Adoro	Screenwriter	TV Rio
1958	Noites Cariocas	Screenwriter	TV Rio
1961	O Riso é o Limite	Screenwriter	TV Rio
1962	Golias Show	Screenwriter	TV Rio
1963	É Uma Graça, Mora	Screenwriter	TV Record
1964	Shows Internacionais	Presenter	TV Record
1965	Quem Bate	Comedian	TV Record
1967 - 1971	Família Trapo	Screenwriter	TV Record
1967	Show do Dia Sete	Screenwriter	TV Record
1968	Troféu Roquette Pinto	Screenwriter	TV Record
1972-1973	Bronco Total	Himself	TV Record
1975-1976 1977-1986	Os Trapalhões	Screenwriter, director and comedian	TV Tupi Rede Globo
1977	Praça da Alegria	Screenwriter and final writer	Rede Globo
1987	Praça Brasil	Presenter	Rede Bandeirantes
1987 - presente	A Praça é Nossa	Presenter	SBT
1990	Romeu e Julieta	Amigo de Romeu	SBT
1990 - 1997	A Escolinha do Golias	Professor Cagliostro	SBT
1999	Ô...Coitado!	Cameo	SBT
2002	SBT Palace Hotel	Manoel	SBT
2003	Romeu e Julieta	Amigo de Romeu	SBT
2009 - 2010	Vende-se um Véu de Noiva	Juca Moréia	SBT
2011	30 Anos de Chaves	Professor Girafales	SBT
2011	Uma Dupla Quase Dinâmica	De Nóbrega	SBT
2014	Pousada do Ratinho	Proprietário do Banco	SBT
2016	Tá no Ar: a TV na TV	Himself (Cameo)	Rede Globo
2018	Dra. Darci	Seu Manuel	Multishow

=== Film ===
Year	Title	Role
1969	Golias Contra o Homem das Bolinhas	Geraldo
1975	Efigênia Dá Tudo Que Tem	Roteirista
1979	Cinderelo Trapalhão	Roteirista
2017	Os Parças	Toninho La Paz
2019	Tá Rindo de Que?- Humor e Ditadura	Ele mesmo
2021	No Gogó do Paulinho	Ele mesmo

=== Internet ===
Year	Title	Role	Platform
2019-presente	Canal do Carlos Alberto	Apresentador	YouTube
