= Clayton Silva =

Brazilian actor and comedian (1938–2013)

Clayton Silva (February 6, 1938 – January 15, 2013) was a Brazilian actor and comedian. He was a regular cast member on the SBT television series, A Praça é Nossa, from the show's debut in 1987 until his death in January 2013. Silva coined several of the show's best known catchphrases. His film credits included O Bem Dotado Homem de Itu in 1978, As Aventuras de Mário Fofoca in 1982, and Pecado Horizontal, also released in 1982.

Silva was originally from Uberlândia, Minas Gerais, Brazil. He resided on a farm in São Paulo State, between the cities of Campinas and Indaiatuba, for the last twelve years of his life.

Silva was hospitalized with complications of cancer on December 27, 2012. He died on January 15, 2013, at the Centro Médico hospital in the Barão Geraldo district of Campinas at the age of 74.
