= A Praça é Nossa =

- Genre: Comedy
- Created by: Manuel de Nóbrega
- Directed by: Marcelo de Nóbrega
- Presented by: Carlos Alberto de Nóbrega
- Country of origin: Brazil
- Original language: Portuguese
- No. of seasons: 39
- No. of episodes: Over 1600 programs

Production
- Executive producer: José Salerno
- Production location: São Paulo
- Running time: 60 minutes

Original release
- Network: SBT
- Release: 7 May 1987 – present

A Praça é Nossa (lit. 'The Square is Ours') is a Brazilian comedy show produced and broadcast by SBT.

It was created in 1956 by Manuel de Nóbrega, with the name of A Praça da Alegria. It is based using a simple and practical scenario: a bench in a square garden, where several characters pass through.

It debuted on television in 1957 on channel TV Paulista, being led by its creator until the beginning of the 1970s. Until then the attraction already shifted by TV Record and TV Rio. After a while off the air it was broadcast again at 1977–78 by Rede Globo, this time by Luís Carlos Miele.

In 1987, the program was revived at Rede Bandeirantes with the title Praça Brasil, presented by Manuel's son Carlos Alberto de Nóbrega. After four episodes, Carlos Alberto moved to SBT, where he set up a new program with the same format: A Praça é Nossa. The comedy debuted on 7 May 1987. The show has remained on the air since its debut.

Actor Clayton Silva was a series regular from 1987 until 2013.
