= Rodovia Castelo Branco =

Highway in São Paulo

SP-280
- Castelo Branco (Portuguese)
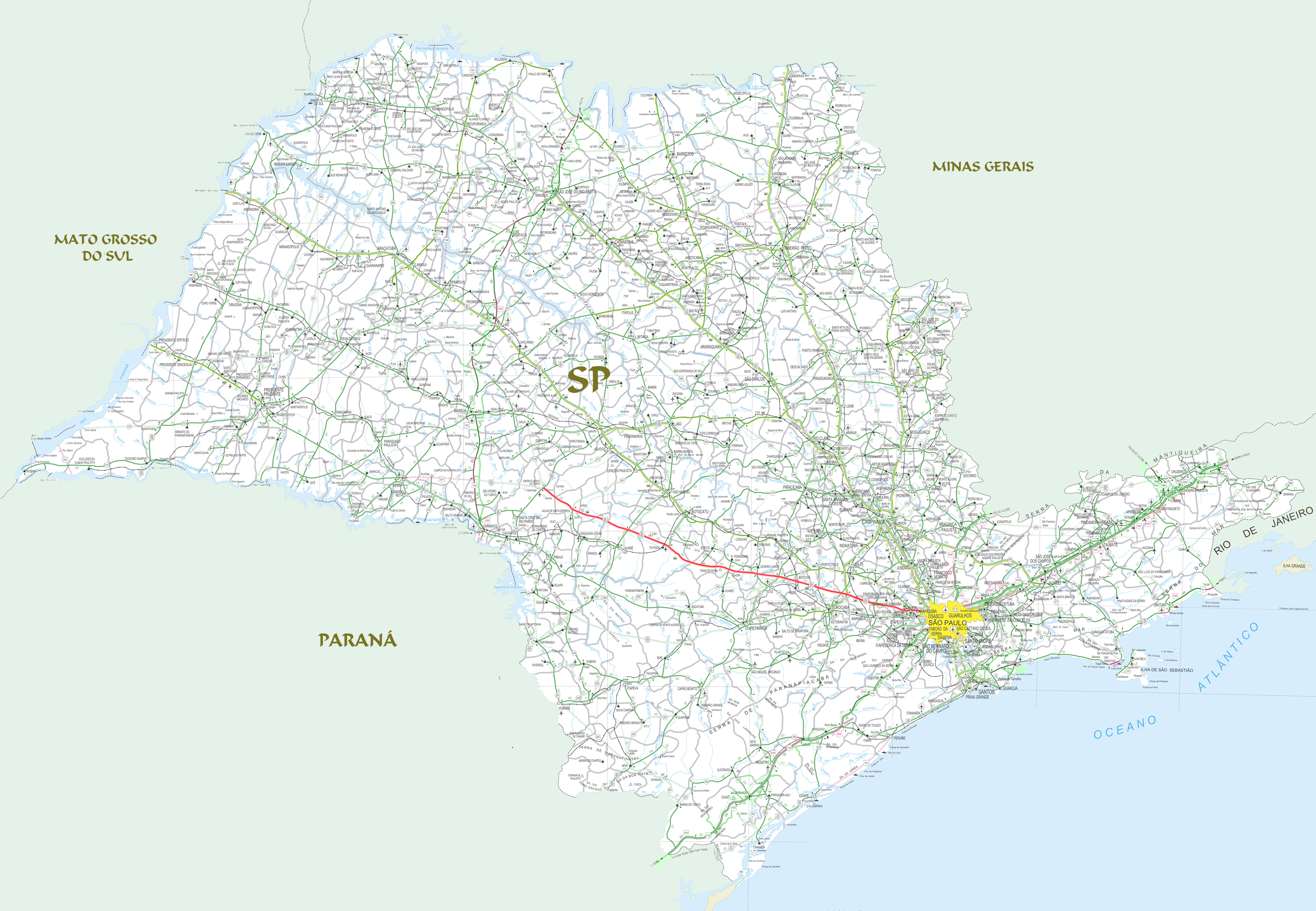
- President Castelo Branco Tollway (in red)

Route information
- Length: 315 km (196 mi)
- Existed: 1967–present

Major junctions
- East end: Osasco Next to São Paulo
- SP 15 SP 21 (Rodoanel Mario Covas) SP 312 (Rodovia dos Romeiros SP-29 SP-209 SP 075 (Rodovia Santos Dumont), km
- West end: Santa Cruz do Rio Pardo

Location
- Country: Brazil
- State: São Paulo
- Municipalities: São Paulo, Osasco, Barueri, Jandira, Itapevi, Santana de Parnaíba, Araçariguama, São Roque, Mairinque, Itu, Sorocaba, Porto Feliz, Boituva, Tatuí, Cesário Lange, Quadra, Porangaba, Bofete, Pardinho, Itatinga, Avaré, Cerqueira César, Iaras, Águas de Santa Bárbara, Santa Cruz do Rio Pardo, Espírito Santo do Turvo

Highway system
- Highways in Brazil; Federal; São Paulo State Highways

The Rodovia Presidente Castelo Branco (SP-280) is a tollway in the state of São Paulo, Brazil. It was first opened on Saturday, 10 November 1968, by, then, the Governor of the state of São Paulo, Abreu Sodré. The tollway name was given in memory of former military despot Field Marshal Humberto de Alencar Castelo Branco, who served as President of Brazil during the military dictatorship.

Running westbound from the city of São Paulo and finishing in Espírito Santo do Turvo, while heading towards the state of Mato Grosso do Sul, near the northern border of the southern state of Paraná, 'Rodovia Castelo Branco, as it is popularly known, is about 315 km (196 mi) long, and one of Brazil's safest tollways. The tollway passes by several cities, including: Barueri, Santana de Parnaíba, São Roque, Sorocaba, Tatuí, Avaré and Águas de Santa Bárbara. Near Barueri and due to the large population of São Paulo, Rodovia Castelo Branco is one of the busiest and widest of Brazil's tollways.

Initially known as Rodovia do Oeste (Western Expressway), it was built in three phases. The first phase was during 1963 to 1968 (from the city of São Paulo to the city of Torre de Pedra, extending 170 km west). The second phase was during 1971, reaching the city limits of São Manuel and Avaré (another 58 km). The final and third phase, for 74 km, ended at highway SP-225, near the city of Santa Cruz do Rio Pardo. Travelers going to Ourinhos and the Northwest part of the State of Paraná often follow the Castelo Branco (SP-225) route.

The tollway is managed and maintained by a state concession to three private companies: SPVias, Rodovias das Colinas and ViaOeste.

== System Castelo-Raposo ==
Together with the Raposo Tavares Highway (SP-270), it links the capital of São Paulo to the western interior of the state, known as the Castelo-Raposo System. It also allows access to the Midwest and North regions of Brazil and neighboring countries (Bolivia and Peru) by interconnecting with the Marechal Rondon Highway (SP-300), made by the João Hypólito Martins Highway (SP-209), which connects the Castle to the city of Botucatu. The Castle is also a route to the southern region of the country (western Paraná) and countries like Paraguay and Argentina.

The concessionaire CCR ViaOeste estimates that around 100 thousand vehicles will travel through the Castelo-Raposo System on a daily basis. The operation is monitored by the 78 cameras linked to the Concessionary's Operational Control Center (CCO) and also by the Integrated Control Center (CCI) of Artesp.

== See also ==
- Highway system of São Paulo
- Brazilian Highway System
