= Granja Carolina =

Coordinates: 23°35′04″S 46°57′15″W

- District of the city of Itapevi
- Country: Brazil
- State: São Paulo
- Municipality: Itapevi

Area
  - Total: 8.89 km^{2} (3.43 sq mi)

Granja Carolina is a rural neighborhood of the municipality of Itapevi and the city of Cotia, in the state of São Paulo.

Granja Carolina is an old farm that belongs to the estate of Celso Santos. With an acreage of 8,896,100.25 m^{2}, it is divided into two tracts: one located in Itapevi with 5,660,320.00 m^{2}, and another in Cotia, with 3,235,780.25 m^{2}. A partnership agreement was established between the owners and Alphaville Urbanismo SA, in which the owners provided the whole property and Alphaville would implement real estate developments in the neighborhood.

A large real estate development (Vila Florestal - Reserva Cotia) was developed by Alphaville to deploy a high standard condominium in the neighborhood.

== Vila Florestal - Reserva Cotia ==
"Vila Florestal - Reserva Cotia" is a large real estate project of the responsibility of AlphaVille, the company that implemented the condominium complex in the upscale city of Barueri. The project will have two residential settlements with total area of de 4,790,555 m^{2}. It is estimated that the project will bring 8,890 people to the region. Also included in the project are commercial areas, green areas, institutional areas as required by the legislation, and the preservation of more than 3.2 million square meters of green areas. The project received its license early 2016. The project, which is also known as "Alphaville Cotia" and "Granja Carolina Condo", will benefit from São Lourenço Production System, a development of public water supply in the Metropolitan Region of São Paulo. Part of this project is the installation in the condominium of a water reservoir, with a total volume of 30,000 m^{3}.

== Access ==
The neighborhood is bounded by the districts Vila Belmira and Roselândia, condo Vila Verde and the Raposo Tavares highway.

The neighborhood is accessible via the road "Estrada do Pau Furado".
