= Itapevi =

Municipality in the State of São Paulo, Brazil

- Municipality
- Municipality of Itapevi
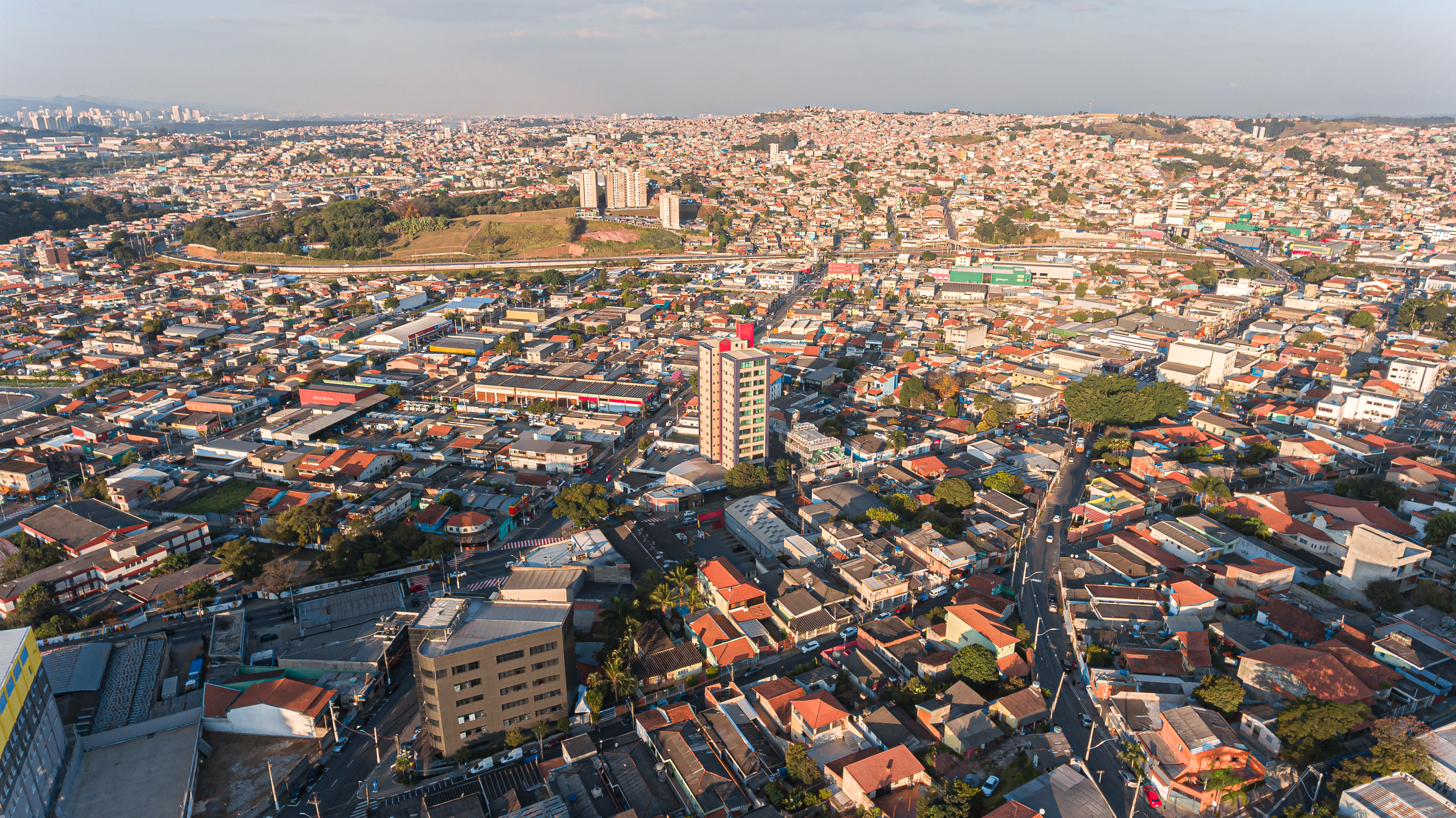
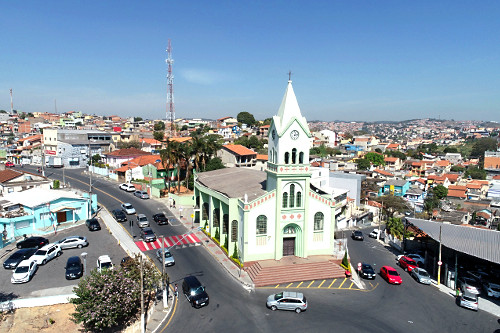
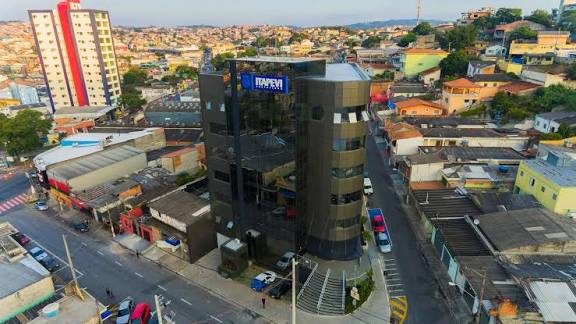
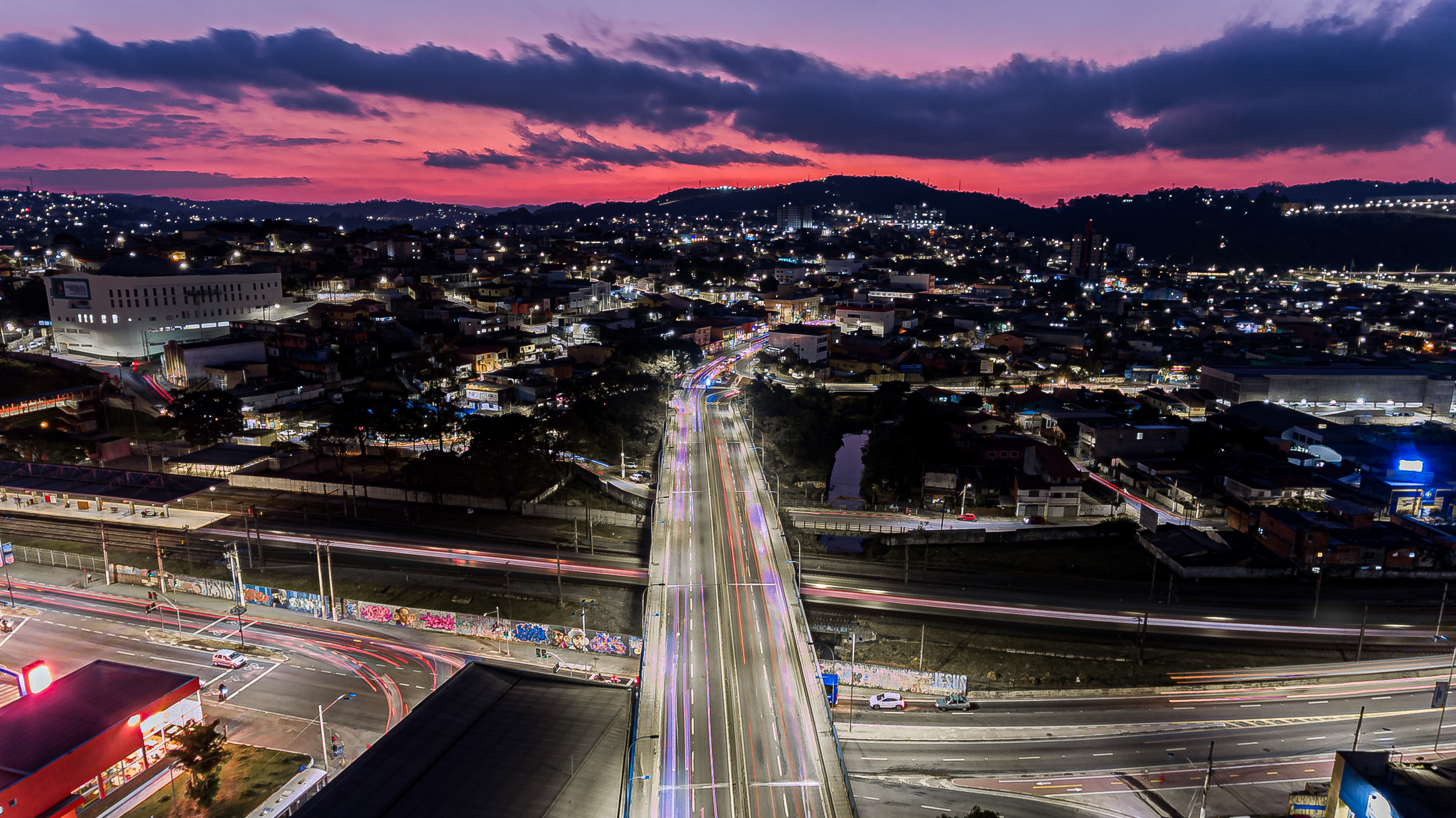
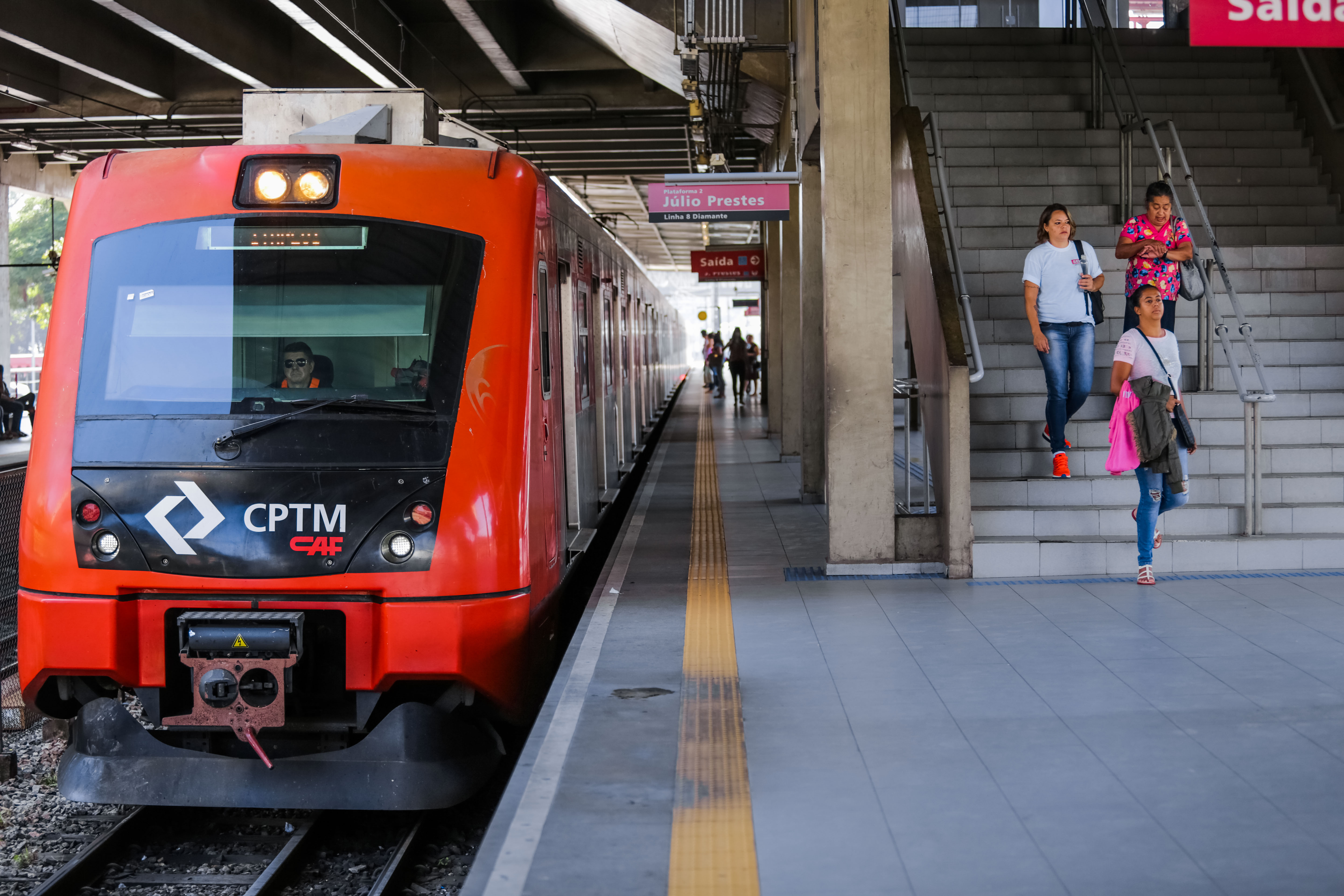
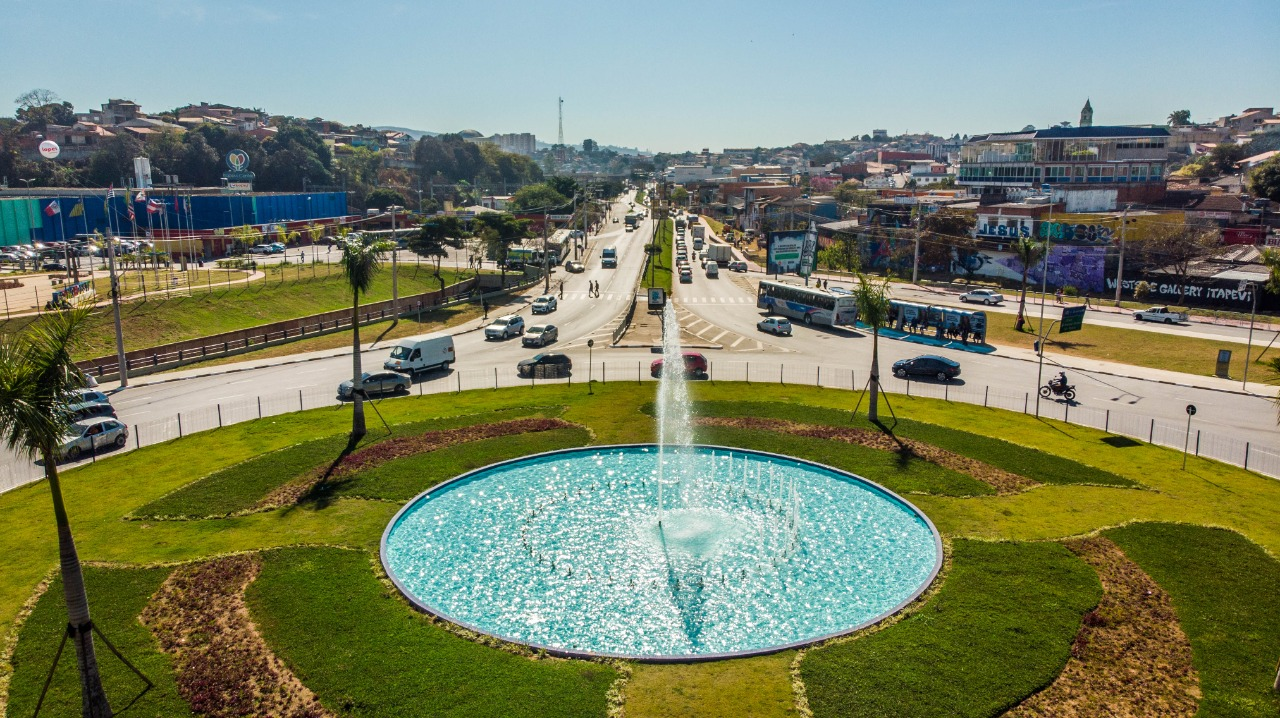
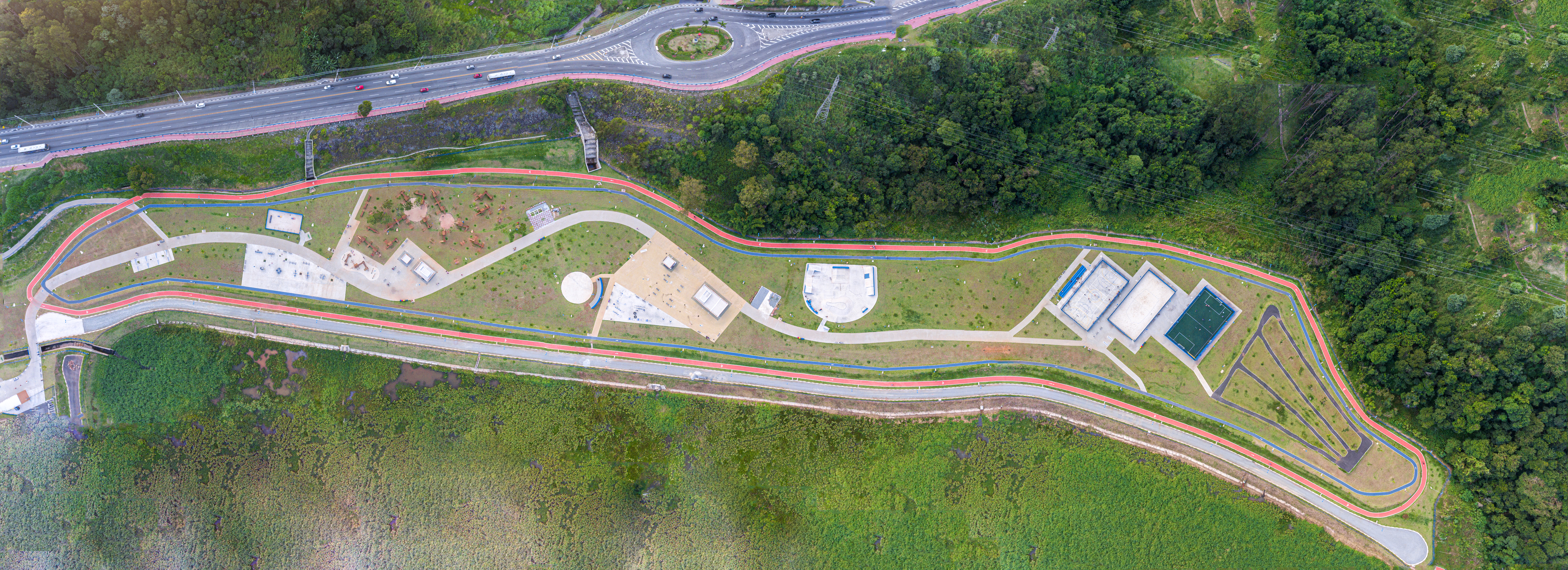
- City panorama Saint Jude Thaddeus Parish City hall Viaduto José dos Santos Novaes Itapevi Station Cohab's Roundabout Itapevi Municipal Park

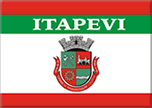
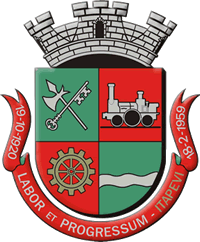
- Flag Coat of arms
- Nickname: ItaCity
- Motto: Labor et progressum
- Location in São Paulo state
- Interactive map of Itapevi
- Location in Brazil Itapevi (South America)
- Coordinates: 23°32′56″S 46°56′3″W
- Country: Brazil
- Region: Southeast
- State: São Paulo
- Intermediate Region: São Paulo
- Immediate Region: São Paulo
- Established: February 18, 1959

Government
  - Mayor: Marcos Ferreira Godoy (Teco) (PODE)

Area
  - Municipality: 82,768 km^{2} (31,957 sq mi)
  - Urban: 37,637 km^{2} (14,532 sq mi)
- Elevation: 741 m (2,431 ft)
- Highest elevation: 1,044 m (3,425 ft)

Population (2022 Brazilian census)
  - Municipality: 232.297
  - Estimate (2025): 242.995
  - Density: 0.0028066/km^{2} (0.0072691/sq mi)
- Demonym: Itapeviense

GDP (PPP, constant 2023 values)
  - Total (Metro): $2.9 billions
  - per capita: $12,800
- Time zone: UTC−3 (BRT)
  - Summer (DST): UTC– 03:00 (BRT)
- Postal Code (CEP): 06650-000 to 06699-999
- Area code: +55 11
- HDI: 0.735 – high
- Website: www.itapevi.sp.gov.br

Itapevi is a municipality in the western area of the São Paulo Metropolitan Region, in the state of São Paulo, in the Southeast Region of Brazil. Originally a village of Cotia, it developed following the arrival of the Estrada de Ferro Sorocabana in the 19th century and became an emancipated municipality in 1959 after a plebiscite. It occupies an area of 82.658 km² (31.9 sq mi), and its population in the 2022 Census was 232,297 inhabitants. It is located 35 kilometers (21.7 mi) from the state capital, São Paulo. It is also located 1,017 km (631 mi) from the federal capital, Brasília.

It is also known as the "Itacity", "City of New Roofs", the "City of Roses", and the "City of Hope".

The formation of the village began around the 18th century, and the first building in the city was a house built around 1720 and used by Bandeirantes. The earliest settlers were probably members of the Abreus family.

The name of District of Itapevy (or Itapevi) was associated with the noble title of Baron of Itapevi, granted on December 28, 1878, to the military Emílio Luís Mallet, officer of the Brazilian Imperial Army and later patron of the Arm of Artillery of the Brazilian Army.

== Etymology ==
The toponym comes from the Tupi language word Itapevi and means "river of flat stones", according to two books: Vocabulário Tupi-Guarani – Português, by Prof. Silveira Bueno (Brasilivros Editora), and A Origem dos Nomes dos Municípios Paulistas (Imprensa Oficial do Estado de São Paulo, 2003), by Enio Squeff and Helder Perri Ferreira.

The latter work states: "Itapevi (from Tupi itá peb'y): river of flat stone slabs, from ita-peba (flat stone slab) and 'y (river or waters)".

== History ==
On July 10, 1875, the train station of Cotia (Sorocabana) was inaugurated, around which formed the core of Itapevi. In 1895, the Italian Giulio Michaeli opened a quarry for the production of paving stones, attracting families of Italian immigrants, such as Belli, Michelotti and Silicani.

In 1912, Joaquim Nunes Filho (Nho Quim), from Cotia city, purchased the Sítio Itapevy, with 152 bushels. This place covering all the current city center. Nunes became a local political boss, for his ties to the former PRP (Partido Republicano Paulista). He managed the elevation of the village to district Cotia on October 12, 1920. Nunes has brought electricity in 1929 and the installation of the first telephone in 1930.

Nevertheless, the reference of the place was still under the name of Cotia train station, removing the possibility of identifying own the place.

In 1940, he arrived in Itapevi Carlos de Castro, businessman. Knowing that the Nunes family had pretensions to sell the land that belonged to Joaquim Nunes (who died in 1941), he acquired vast tract of land, giving rise to the allotment of Parque Suburbano and Jardim Bela Vista. It was from there that accelerated the process of urbanization of the place.

At the time, the train station was still called Cotia and the headquarters of the future city was known as Vila Cotia. With this, they created enormous confusion up to the postal and telegraph service in the district. In 1945, Carlos de Castro got with then Minister João Alberto that the station had its name changed to Itapevi. The people celebrated this decree.

On May 10, 1952, Carlos de Castro met with three other residents of the district: Nicolau Leonardo, Raul Leonardo and Ezequiel Dias Siqueira. Together, they drafted a petition to the Assembléia Legislativa do Estado de São Paulo for the emancipation of the district. Taking more than a thousand signatures, but even so, they were defeated by the fact that Itapevi was very near Cotia and that residents were indebted to the city. They had to wait five years for the project to be voted on again. From then and now, in a spirit of emancipation throughout this region, members of the society of the time initiated the movement for autonomy in the district, causing the population to commit mass in the process. Its founders were men like himself Carlos de Castro, Americo Christianini, Cezário de Abreu, Bonifácio de Abreu, Rubens Caramez (then councilor of Cotia and who later became the first mayor of Itapevi), Raul Leonardo (the only emancipatory still alive), Jose dos Santos Novaes, Antônio Pedra Pereira and many others.

In 1958, about nine hundred people opted for emancipation, against only thirty unwilling to accept autonomy in a referendum. That same year was formalized by Governor Jânio Quadros the law that created the city of Itapevi. The city was officially founded in the following year, on February 18, 1959, by Governor Carvalho Pinto. The first mayor was Rubens Caramez, who won the elections against Carlos de Castro.

== Politics ==
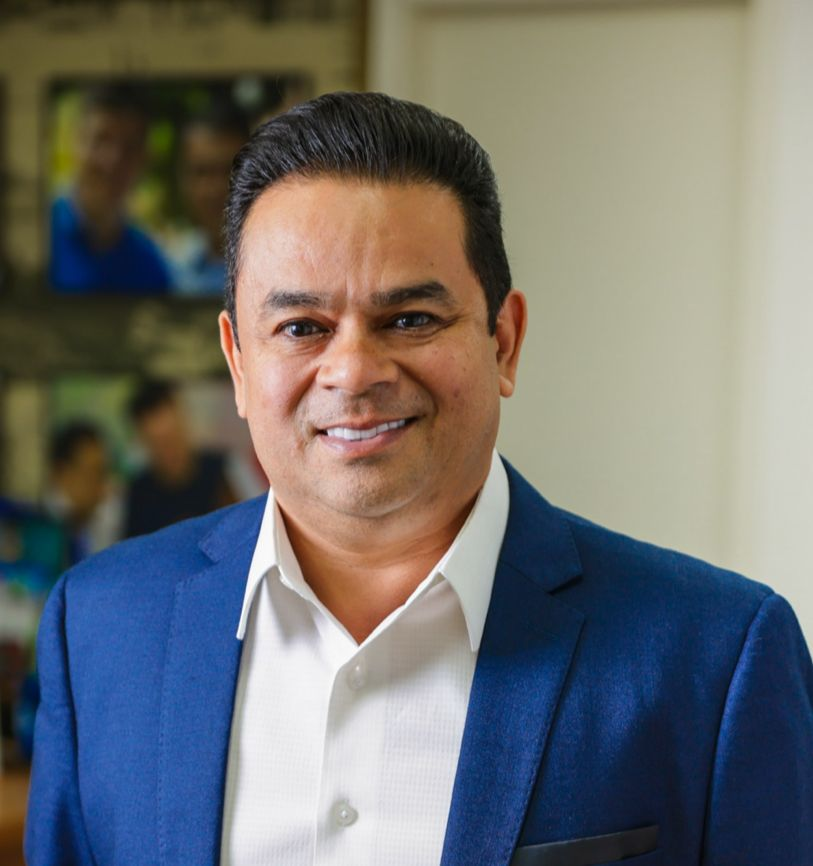
Current mayor of Itapevi, Teco Godoy

The Executive Power is currently exercised by Mayor Marcos Ferreira Godoy (Teco) (PODE) – elected in 2024 and, by vice-mayor Thiaguinho (PL) and by the municipal secretaries appointed by the mayor. Legislative power is exercised by 17 councilors.

=== List of mayors of Itapevi ===
- Rubens Caramez (1960–1964) vice: Romeu Manfrinatto
- Romeu Manfrinatto (1965–1968) vice: Pedro de Oliveira e Silva
- Osmar de Souza (1969–1972) vice: Dorival de Oliveira
- Romeu Manfrinatto (1973–1976) vice: Claro Camargo Ribeiro
- Jurandir Salvarani (1977–1982) vice: João Caramez
- Silas Manoel de Oliveira (1983–1988) vice: Elias de Souza
- Jurandir Salvarani (1989–1992) vice: Ramiro Eleutério Novaes
- João Caramez (1993–1996) vice: Lázaro Toledo Queiroz Filho
- Sérgio Montanheiro (1997–2000) vice: José Francisco de Oliveira
- Dalvani Anália Nasi Caramez (2001–2004) vice: Lineu Alberto Góis
- Maria Ruth Banholzer (2005–2008) vice: Jaci Tadeu da Silva
- Maria Ruth Banholzer (2009–2013) vice: Jaci Tadeu da Silva
- Jaci Tadeu da Silva (2013–2017) vice: Fláudio Azevedo Limas
- Igor Soares (2017–2021) vice: Marcos Teco Godoy
- Igor Soares (2021–2025) vice: Marcos Teco Godoy
- Marcos Ferreira Godoy (Teco) (2025–2029) vice: Thiaguinho Silva

== Education ==
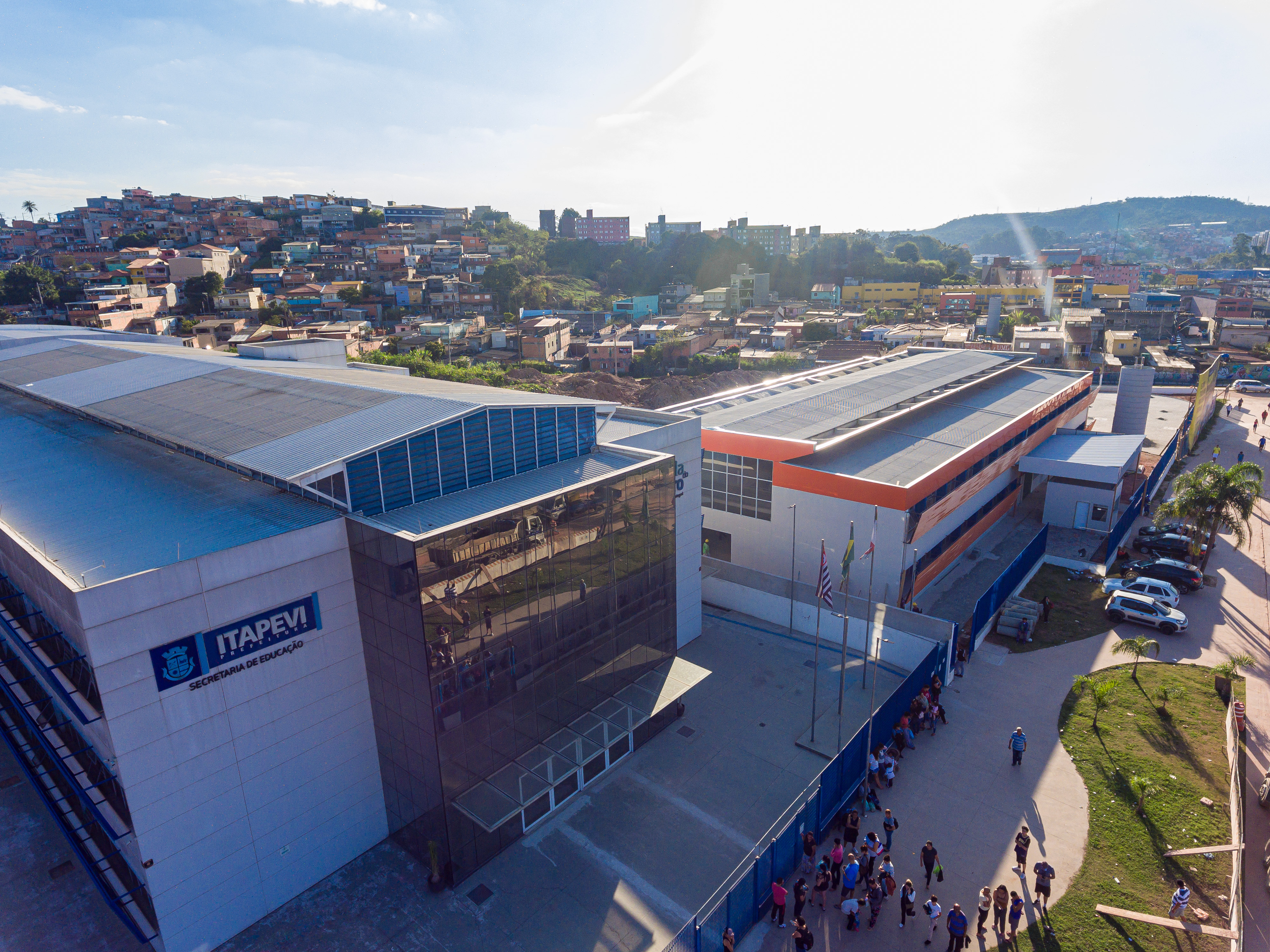
School of the Future in the Parque Suburbano neighborhood, next to FATEC in Itapevi

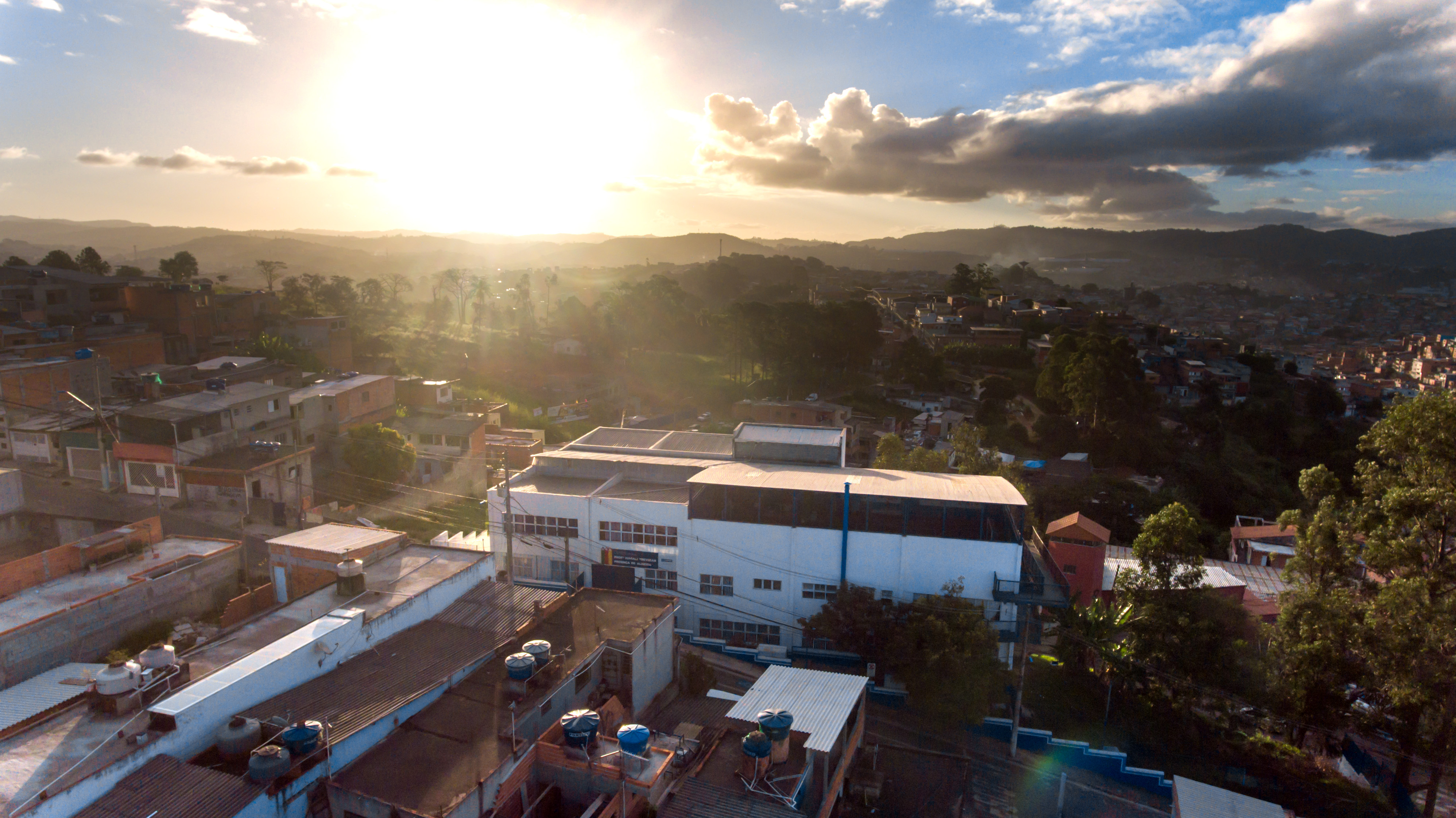
Magali Trevisan Proença de Almeida Full-Time School

The city has the headquarters of the Itapevi Education Board, responsible for the state schools in the city itself, Barueri, Jandira, Pirapora do Bom Jesus and Santana do Parnaíba. There are around 65 municipal schools installed., in addition to having headquarters for the Institutes Cacau Show and Eurofarma.

Itapevi currently maintains five Schools of the Future in the neighborhoods of Parque Suburbano, Jardim Santa Rita e, Cardoso, Amador Bueno and Cohab.

=== Faculties ===
Some of the colleges that have in-person or virtual centers in Itapevi are:

- FAEESP
- Open University of Brazil
- Anhanguera-Uniderp University
- Virtual Cruzeiro do Sul University
- UNIP (EAD)
- Faculty of Technology of the State of São Paulo (FATEC)

== Health ==
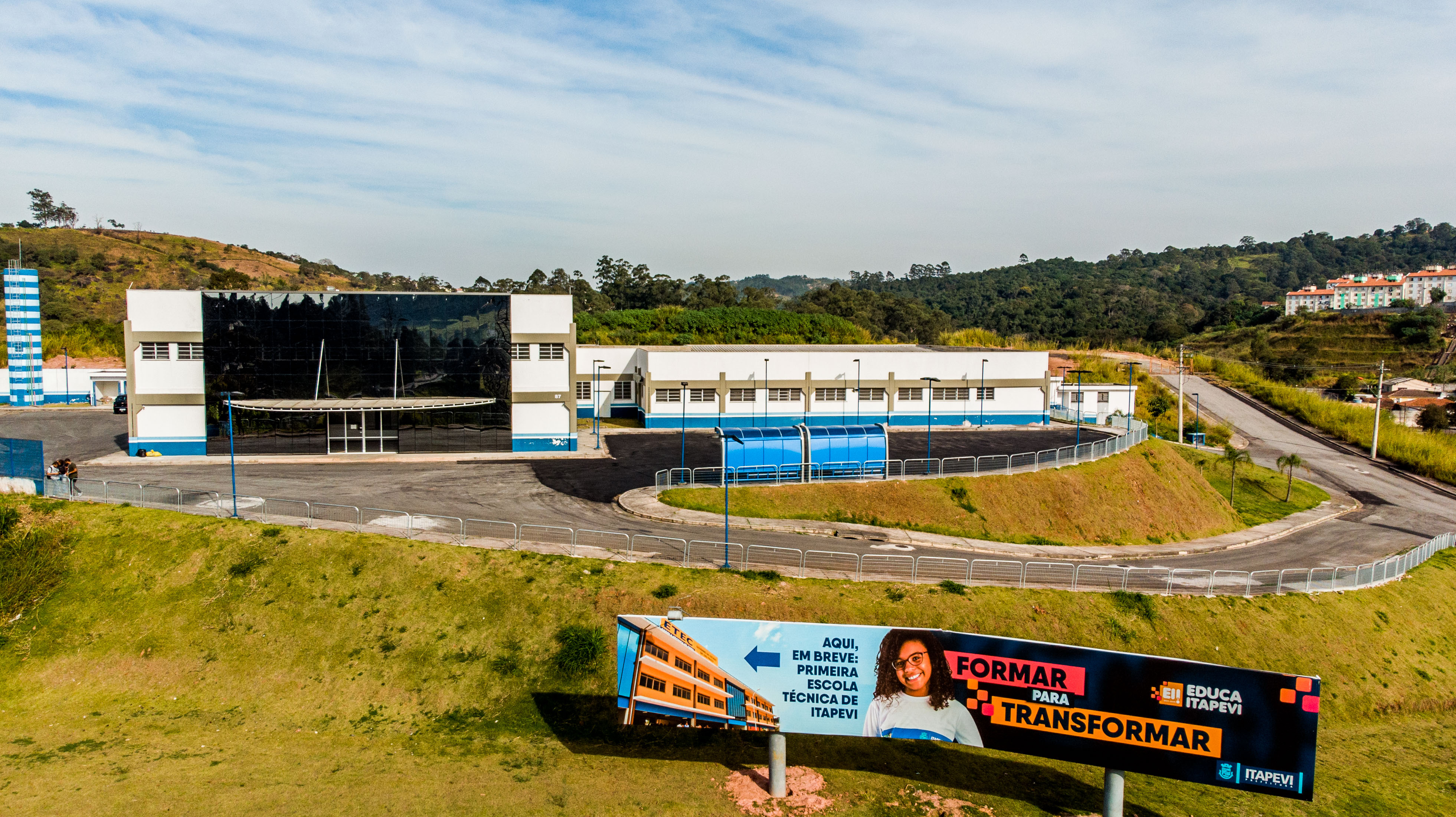
Integrated Health Center of Itapevi

Itapevi has a wide range of healthcare facilities, with private and public hospitals, specialized centers and basic units, including:

=== Emergency Care Units (24h) ===
- Itapevi Geral Hospital
- Central Emergency Room
- Children's Emergency Room
- UPA (Emergency Care Unit) Cardoso

=== Private hospitals ===
- Hospital Yes
- Hospital NovaVida Notredame Medicina

=== Basic Health Units (UBS and USF) ===
- UBS Central
- UBS Rainha
- UBS Vitápolis
- UBS Cardoso
- UBS Amador Bueno
- USF Ambuitá
- USF Chácara Santa Cecília
- USF Jardim Santa Rita
- USF Parque Suburbano
- USF Suburbano
- USF Vila Gióia

=== Specialized Centers ===
- Integrated Health Center
- CAPS II (Adult)
- CAPS II (Children)
- CAPS AD (Alcohol and Drugs)
- REAB (Rehabilitation Center)
- CEO (Dental Specialties Center)
- Health Surveillance (Zoonoses and Health Surveillance)

== Subdivisions ==
Itapevi officially has 107 neighborhoods in its territorial extension. This division ranges from the central region to more remote districts and subdivisions. Some neighborhoods of Itapevi

- Alto da Colina
- Amador Bueno
- Ambuitá
- Bairro dos Abreus
- Centro
- Chácara Lagoinha
- Chácaras Monte Serrat
- Chácara Primavera
- Chácara Santa Cecília
- Chácara Selva
- Chácara Vitápolis
- Cidade da Saúde
- Cidade do Sol
- Cohab – Setor A
- Cohab – Setor B
- Cohab – Setor D
- Condomínio Nova São Paulo
- Ingahi
- Jardim Alabama
- Jardim Bela Vista
- Jardim Briquet
- Jardim Cruzeiro
- Jardim Dona Elvira
- Jardim Hokkaido
- Jardim Itacolomi
- Jardim Itaparica
- Jardim Itapoã
- Jardim Itapevi
- Jardim Jurema
- Jardim Julieta
- Jardim Maria Cecília
- Jardim Maria Judite
- Jardim Marina
- Jardim Maristela
- Jardim Mirador
- Jardim Nova Cotia
- Jardim Nova Itapevi
- Jardim Paulista
- Jardim Portela
- Jardim Rainha
- Jardim Rosemary
- Jardim Ruth
- Jardim Santa Rita
- Jardim Santo Américo
- Jardim São Carlos
- Jardim São Luiz
- Jardim São Paulo
- Jardim Sorocabano
- Jardim Vitápolis
- Parque Boa Esperança
- Parque Mira Flores
- Parque Itamarati
- Parque Santo Antônio
- Parque Suburbano
- Parque Wey
- Quatro Encruzilhadas
- Recanto Camargo Ribeiro
- Refúgio dos Pinheiros
- Refúgio Verde
- Residencial Colinas de São José
- Residencial Parque Itamarati
- Residencial Vale do Sol
- Transurb
- Vila Aparecida
- Vila Áurea
- Vila Aurora
- Vila Belmira
- Vila da Paz
- Vila Dolores
- Vila Dona Paulina
- Vila Dr. Cardoso
- Vila Esperança
- Vila Gióia
- Vila Lícia
- Vila Nova Itapevi
- Vila Nova Esperança
- Vila Olímpia
- Vila Olinda
- Vila Recanto Paulistano
- Vila Santa Flora
- Vila Santa Rita
- Vila Santo Antônio da Boa Vista
- Vila São Francisco
- Vila Verde

=== COHAB ===
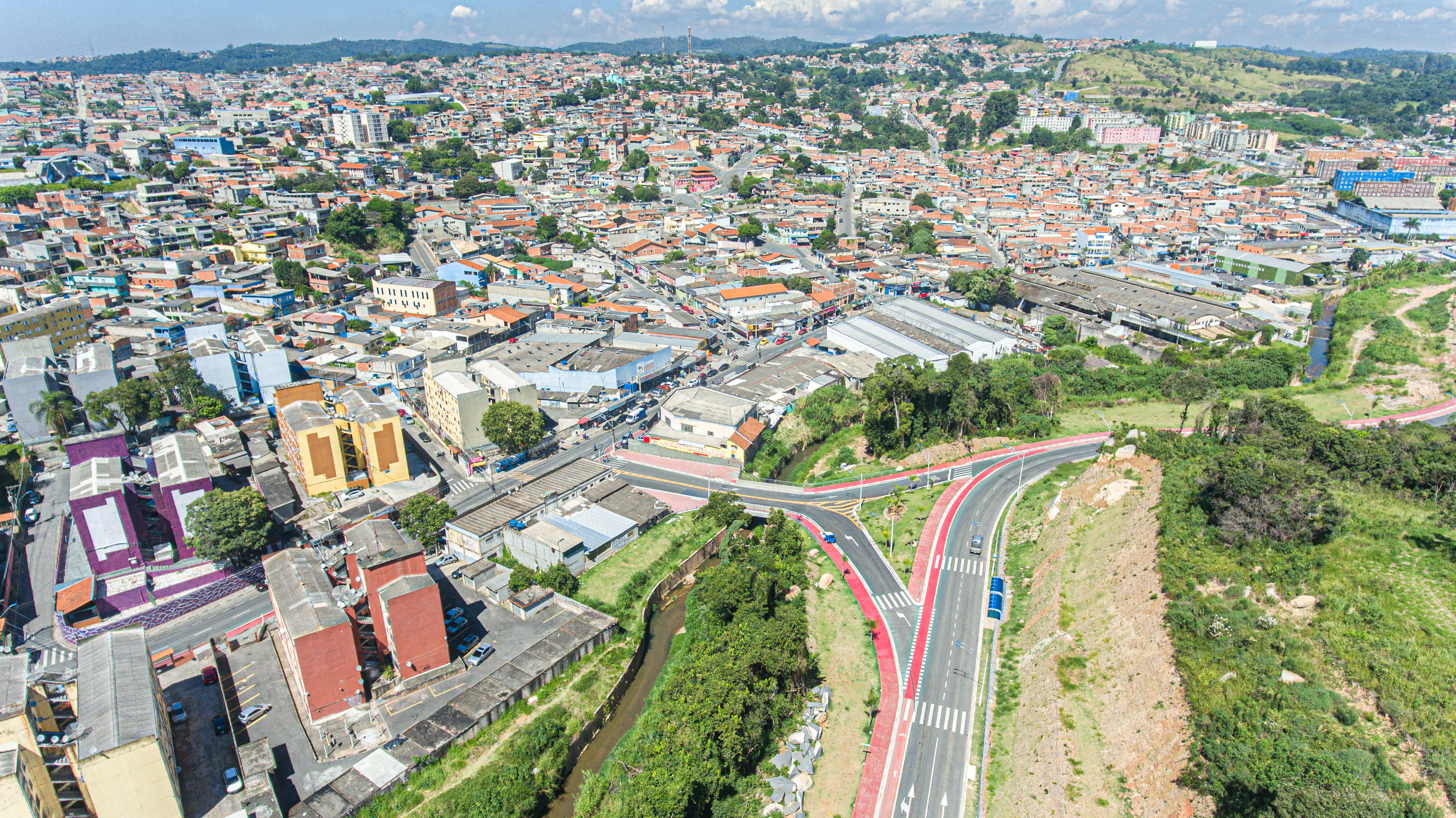
Cohab New Access Bridge

Around the 1980s, the São Paulo Metropolitan Housing Company – COHAB, launched the Presidente Housing Complex Tancredo Neves, increasing the city's demographic density. And in the 1990s, the city received three more housing complexes, these built by the Housing and Urban Development Company – CDHU, from the state government. As a result, there was strong migration to the city.

== Geography ==
=== Physical setting ===
The municipality is located at coordinates 23°32'56" S, 46°56'03" W. The total area of the municipality is 82,658 km², ranking 600th in the list of the largest cities in the state of São Paulo. Of the entire area of the municipality, 37,498 km² are urban areas, ranking 266th on the list of the largest in Brazil. It is limited to the municipality of Santana de Parnaíba to the north and northwest, Barueri to the northeast, Jandira to the east, Cotia to the south and southeast, Vargem Grande Paulista to the southwest and São Roque to the west.

Itapevi is under the control of the Atlantic Plateau, where we can see the following types of relief: floodplains, alluvial plains, hills and mountains. Serra do Itaqui extends along the border with the municipality of Santana de Parnaíba, where the Aldeia da Serra region is located. The city's ground zero is located 35 kilometers west of the capital of São Paulo, and the current urban center is located in the floodplain of the Barueri-Mirim river, a tributary of the Tietê River.

=== Climate ===
Itapevi climate is subtropical, temperate, warm the coldest month being July and warmest in February. Rainfall is abundant, amounting to an annual average of 1,324 mm. According to Köppen, Itapevi can be classified as a humid subtropical climate "Cfa".

The climate table below shows the monthly and annual mean temperatures and rainfall for the city of Itapevi:

Climate data for Itapevi
Month	Jan	Feb	Mar	Apr	May	Jun	Jul	Aug	Sep	Oct	Nov	Dec	Year
Mean daily maximum °C (°F)	28.6 (83.5)	28.6 (83.5)	28.2 (82.8)	26.2 (79.2)	24.2 (75.6)	23.0 (73.4)	23.1 (73.6)	24.9 (76.8)	25.9 (78.6)	26.6 (79.9)	27.4 (81.3)	27.6 (81.7)	26.2 (79.2)
Mean daily minimum °C (°F)	17.5 (63.5)	17.8 (64.0)	16.9 (62.4)	14.2 (57.6)	11.5 (52.7)	9.9 (49.8)	9.3 (48.7)	10.5 (50.9)	12.5 (54.5)	14.2 (57.6)	15.3 (59.5)	16.7 (62.1)	13.9 (57.0)
Average precipitation mm (inches)	218 (8.6)	185 (7.3)	157 (6.2)	68 (2.7)	69 (2.7)	56 (2.2)	42 (1.7)	37 (1.5)	83 (3.3)	114 (4.5)	134 (5.3)	161 (6.3)	1,324 (52.1)
Source: CPA UNICAMP

== Culture ==
=== Music ===
In addition to the trap artist Veigh, who achieved national and international recognition, the city is also the birthplace of other notable artists, including performers from the hip hop movement and groups dedicated to samba. The Trap Fest event, for example, demonstrates the strength of the musical genre in the region. To promote samba de roda, the Samba da Casa 26 group organizes performances that celebrate the genre and serve as a meeting point for the community.

=== Visual arts ===
In 2018, the Guinness Book officially recognized the largest graffiti wall in the world as being located in the city, on the banks of the Rodovia Castello Branco (SP-280), at the Cacau Show factory, depicting the process from planting to harvesting cocoa. Measuring approximately 5,772.11 m², the mural was created by artist Eduardo Kobra, who already held the record for a graffiti wall produced in 2016 on the eve of the Olympic Games in Rio de Janeiro.

== Economy ==
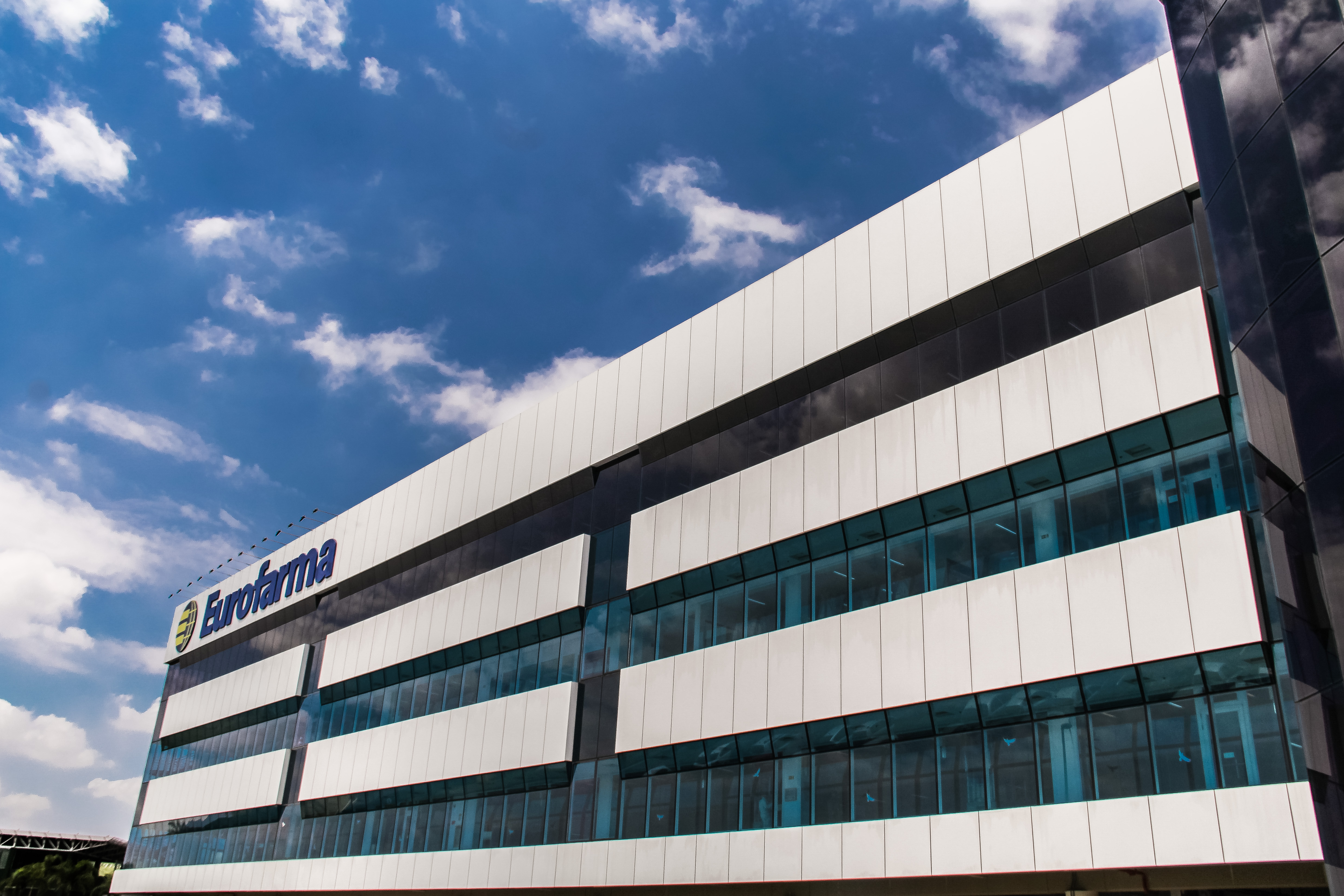
Eurofarma complex in Itapevi

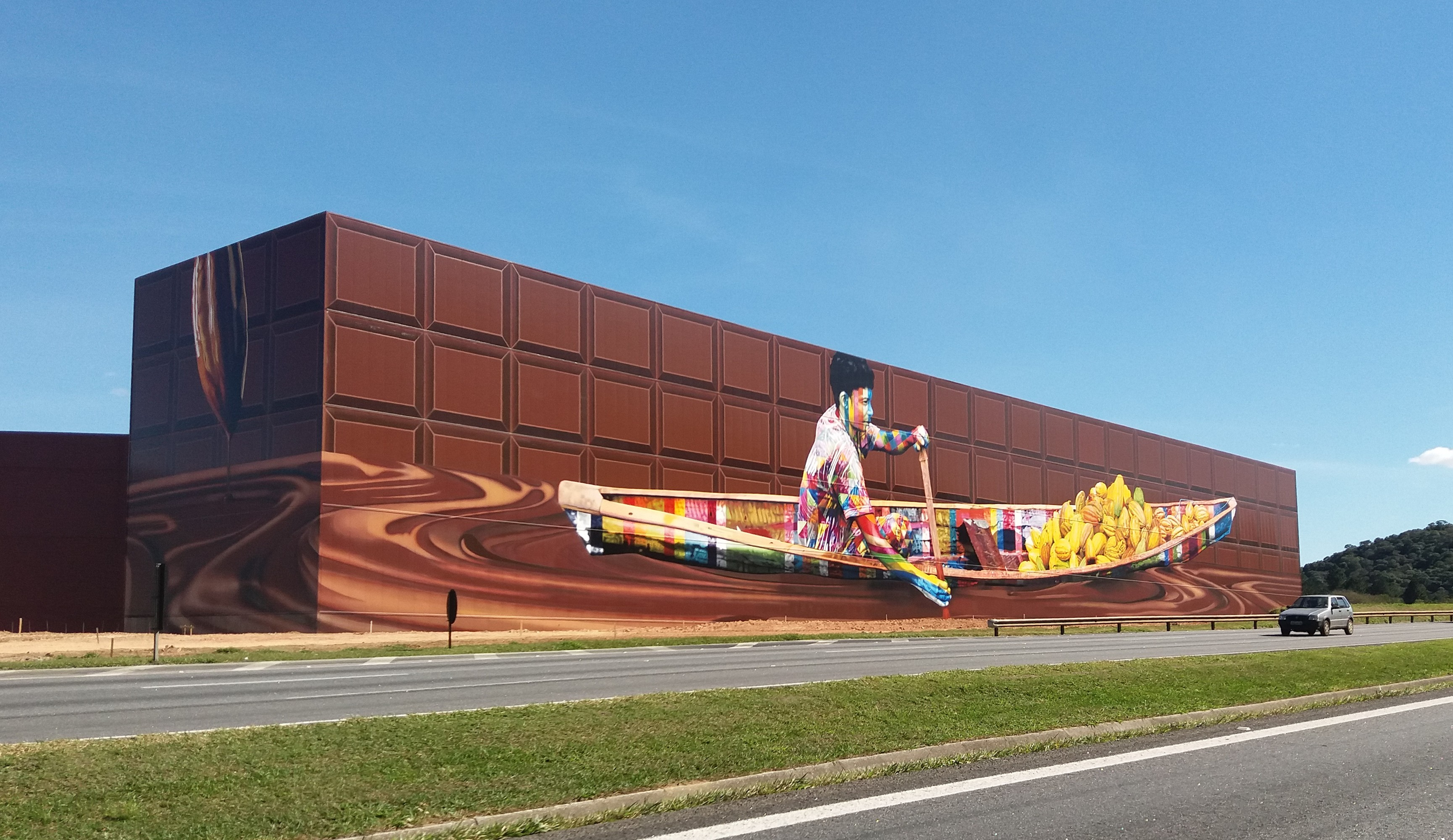
Headquarters and main factory of Cacau Show, located in Itapevi

Itapevi's economy comes from the services and commerce sector (71.5%), industry (18.8%) and public administration (9.7%). The municipality concentrates almost all its population in urban areas, resulting in reduced agricultural activity. In 2023, the municipality closed with a GDP of R$15.6 billion (U$2,9 billion) and per capita of R$67.220,40 (U$12.870,24), placing it among the 150 richest municipalities in Brazil.

The Exame Magazine pointed Itapevi among the 10 cities with the best economic development in the country, and as the first in the state of São Paulo. The ranking is part of the story "The best cities for business'.

Itapevi has a well diversified industrial park, with an emphasis on the pharmaceutical industry. Large companies are located within the municipality, such as Henkel, Jaraguá, Cacau show, Casa Suíça, Eurofarma, Alpla, Wyeth, Blanver, Bomi Brasil, Leonardo S.P.A, Pfizer, Biolab, Levi Strauss & Co. Brasil and others.

Between 1960 and 1980, one of the main industries was the Santa Rita Cement Factory, which belonged to the Grupo Votorantim and was deactivated and demolished.

== Transportation ==
=== Rail transport ===
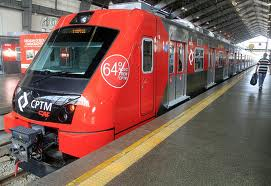
One of the first new trains for Line 8 (Diamante) by CPTM – (Itapevi ↔ Julio Prestes)

- Line 8 (Diamante)
  - Engenheiro Cardoso
  - Itapevi (formerly Cotia train station)
  - Santa Rita
  - Ambuitá
  - Amador Bueno
- Itapevi–Butantã Metropolitan Corridor

=== Road transport ===
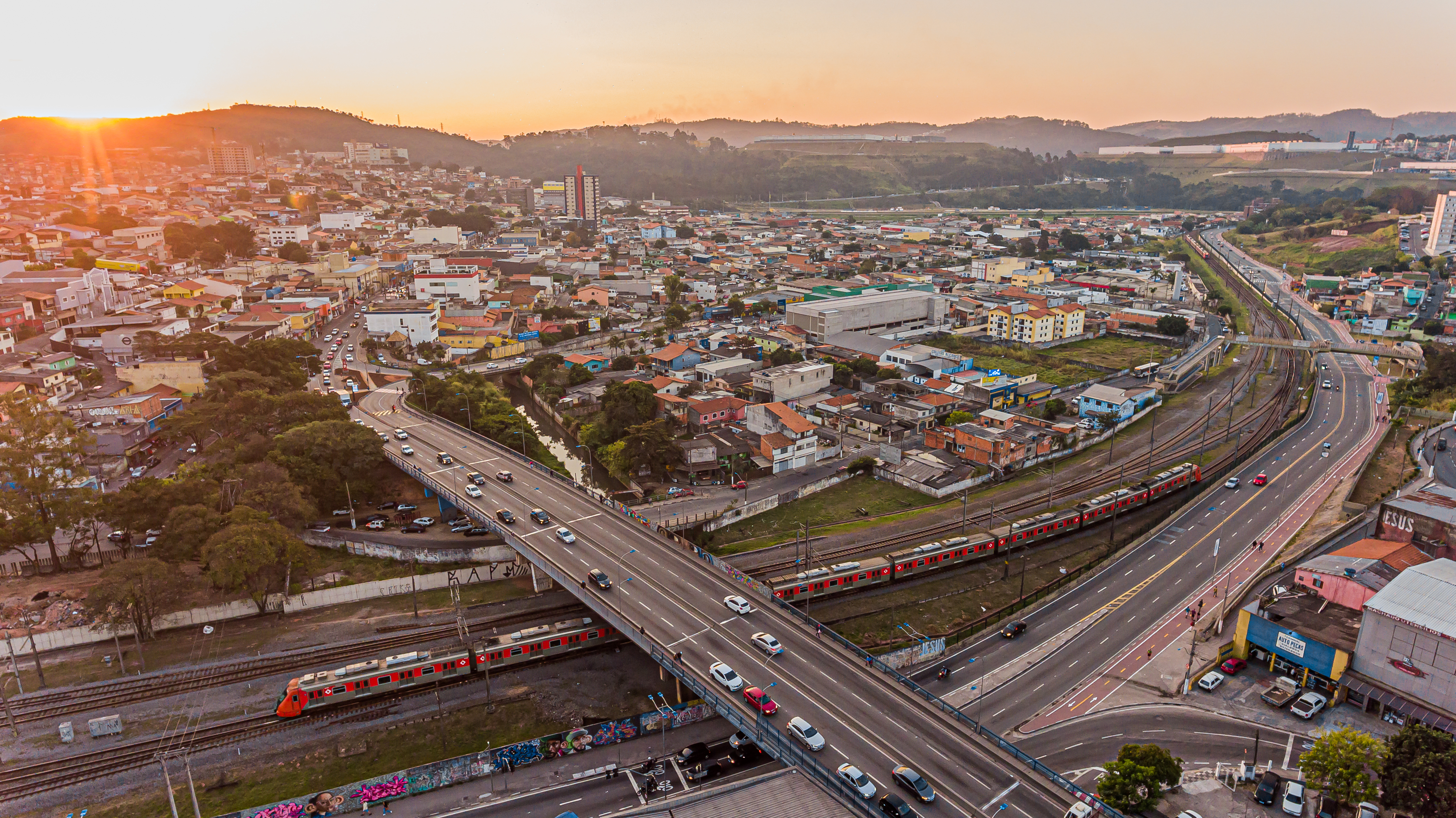
Viaduto José dos Santos Novaes, section of SP-029

Itapevi is mainly crossed by three main highways, namely:

- Rodovia Castelo Branco: The main artery, which crosses the municipality from east to west between the border with Jandira and the border with Santana de Parnaíba .
- Rodovia Coronel PM Nelson Tranchesi: It cuts across the municipality from north to south, connecting it to Cotia.
- Rodovia Engenheiro Renê Benedito da Silva: Another east-west artery that connects the municipality to Barueri, Jandira and São Roque.

== Demography ==
- Total: 232.297 inhabitants (2022).
- Demographic density (inhabitants/km^{2}): 2.430,15
- Child mortality until 1 year (in 1000): 9,74 (2004)
- HDI : 0,735 (2010)
  - HDI-M Income: 0,663
  - HDI-M Longevity: 0,737
  - HDI-M Education: 0,876

(Source: IPEA data)

Changing demographics of the city of Itapevi

Source: IBAM and IBGE

== Media ==
In telecommunications, the city was served by Companhia Telefônica Brasileira until 1973, when it began to be served by Telecomunicações de São Paulo. In July 1998, the company was acquired by Telefónica, which adopted the Vivo brand in 2012.

The company currently operates mobile phone, fixed-line, internet (fiber optics/4G), and television (satellite and cable) services.

== Religion ==
Christian traditions are present regularly in Itapevi, with popular festivals related to the holidays of Corpus Christi and Passion of Christ.

Christianity is present in the city in the following way:

=== Catholic Church ===
The Catholic church in the municipality is part of the Diocese of Osasco.

=== Protestant Church ===
The most diverse evangelical beliefs are present in the city, mainly Pentecostal, including the Assemblies of God in Brazil (the largest evangelical church in the country), Christian Congregation in Brazil, among others. These denominations are growing more and more throughout Brazil.

== See also ==
- List of municipalities in São Paulo
- Museum of Art of the Parliament of Itapevi
