= Teco Godoy =

Brazilian politician (born 1975)

Marcos Ferreira Godoy
- Teco in 2024

Mayor of Itapevi
- In office 1 January 2025 – 31 December 2028
- Preceded by: Igor Soares

Personal details
- Born: 25 March 1975 (age 51) Itapevi, São Paulo
- Party: Podemos

Marcos Ferreira Godoy (born 25 October 1975), better known as Teco, is a Brazilian politician serving as mayor of Itapevi since 2025. Between 2016 and 2024, he served as the deputy mayor of Itapevi."
