= SP-209 (São Paulo highway) =

State highway in São Paulo, Brazil

Rodovia Professor João Hipolito Martins

Route information
- Maintained by Rodovias do Tietê
- Length: 20 km (12 mi)

Major junctions
- South end: Itatinga
- Rodovia Castelo Branco Rodovia Marechal Rondon
- North end: Botucatu

Location
- Country: Brazil
- State: São Paulo

Highway system
- Highways in Brazil; Federal

SP-209 is a state highway in the state of São Paulo in Brazil.
