= Vila Belmira =

Coordinates: 23°34′04″S 46°58′38″W

Vila Belmira is a rural neighborhood of Itapevi, municipality in the state of São Paulo, located southwest of its urban center.

The postcode of the neighborhood begins with 06675.

Being a rural neighbourhood, its residences are predominantly farms and country houses with large pastures for livestock, rich vegetation and unpaved roads.

Besides rich vegetation, the neighborhood also has natural springs and Atlantic Forest largely preserved its territory.

== Vegetation ==
The vegetation of Vila Belmira is very rich and consists mainly of native Atlantic Forest fragments and Araucaria moist forest, but these two biomes are increasingly diminishing in the region due to the advancement of urbanization. The neighborhood also has natural springs amidst the Atlantic Forest.

== Culture ==
Although the district belongs to the municipality of Itapevi in the Metropolitan Region of São Paulo, it still contains influences of the popular rural culture thus making the neighborhood having an independent culture.

== Access ==
The neighborhood is currently located in the rural town of Itapevi and is bounded by the neighborhoods of Granja Carolina and Chácaras Monte Serrat and a condominium, now called Vila Verde (formerly Transurb).

The municipal bus company Itapevi, Benfica BBTT makes 6 trips back and forth during weekdays and 3 trips back and forth on Saturdays and Sundays with buses leaving the terminal toward the municipal district.
