= Cacau Show =

Brazilian chocolate manufacturer

- Type: Private
- Industry: Confectionery production
- Founded: 1988
- Founder: Alexandre Tadeu da Costa
- Headquarters: Itapevi, São Paulo, Brazil
- Products: Chocolates
- Net income: ▲US$1.070.4 million (2023)
- Website: cacaushow.com

Cacau Show is a Brazilian chocolate manufacturer based in Itapevi, São Paulo. The company was founded by seventeen-year-old Alexandre Tadeu da Costa in 1988 from his sales of chocolate Easter eggs using door-to-door catalogs.

== History ==
=== Early history ===
In 1988, Alexandre Costa borrowed US$ 500 from a relative to purchase ingredients and molds to make his own chocolate. He started his little business in the district of Casa Verde, located in the northern part of São Paulo. He grew his business to a manufacturing and retail giant progressively. Today, it has more than 3700 franchise stores throughout Brazil that are supplied by a massive factory outside São Paulo turning over more than R$ 4,1 billion in all the franchise stores in 2022. Shortly after the initial steps, Costa invited his high-school friend Sergio Butuem to join the company.

=== Since 2000 ===
The first store was opened in 2001, and the franchise achieved quick growth. In 2008, it surpassed the American company Rocky Mountain to become the largest chain of chocolates in the world in terms of the number of stores. Nowadays the chain is the third largest franchise operation in Brazil and produces more than 50 million pounds of chocolate per year.

In 2011, Cacau Show and its founder won the Ernst&Young Entrepreneur of the Year prize in Brazil, and represented Brazil in the World Entrepreneur of the Year competition in Monaco. In 2013 Cacau Show won the World Retail Awards in France as the Emerging Market Retailer of the Year.
