= Museum of Art of the Parliament of Itapevi =

Museum of Art of the Parliament of Itapevi 'Emanuel von Lauenstein Massarani' (Museu de Arte do Parlamento de Itapevi 'Emanuel von Lauenstein Massarani'), is a contemporary art museum housed in the Parliament of Itapevi. The Palace is located in Nord-Est of the city.

== History ==
Founded in August 2019, the museum was named after Emanuel von Lauenstein Massarani, Brazilian journalist, art critic, diplomatic, writer, historian, museologist. The Museum was created for disseminating the cultural heritage of the Municipality of Itapevi. It is managed by the 'Escola do Parlamento de Itapevi, Doutor Osmar de Souza'.

== Organization ==
The museum collects paintings, sculptures, photographs and prints. The collection include an important contemporary art collection and an 'Outdoor Sculptures Collection' (Esculturas ao Ar Livre). The museum preserves, among others, works by Iwao Nakajima, Joseph Pace, Giuseppe Ranzini, Carlos Araujo.
