= Igor Soares =

Brazilian politician (born 1981)

- Soares in 2025

Member-elect of the Chamber of Deputies
- Assuming office 1 February 2027
- Constituency: São Paulo

Mayor of Itapevi
- In office 1 January 2017 – 1 January 2025
- Vice Mayor: Marcos Godoy
- Preceded by: Jaci Tadeu
- Succeeded by: Marcos Godoy

Member of the Legislative Assembly of São Paulo
- In office 15 March 2015 – 1 January 2017
- Constituency: At-large

Member of the Municipal Chamber of Itapevi
- In office 1 January 2009 – 15 March 2015
- Constituency: At-large

Personal details
- Born: Igor Soares Ebert; 20 June 1981 (age 45) Curitiba, Paraná
- Party: PSD (since 2026)
- Other political affiliations: PPS (2004–2008); PP (2008–2012); PSC (2012–2013); PODE (2013–2025)
- Website: igorsoares.com.br

Igor Soares Ebert (born 20 June 1981) is a Brazilian politician who was elected member of the Chamber of Deputies in 2026. From 2017 to 2024, he served as mayor of Itapevi. From 2015 to 2016, he was a member of the Legislative Assembly of São Paulo.
