= Eurofarma =

Brazilian multinational corporation of biopharmaceuticals

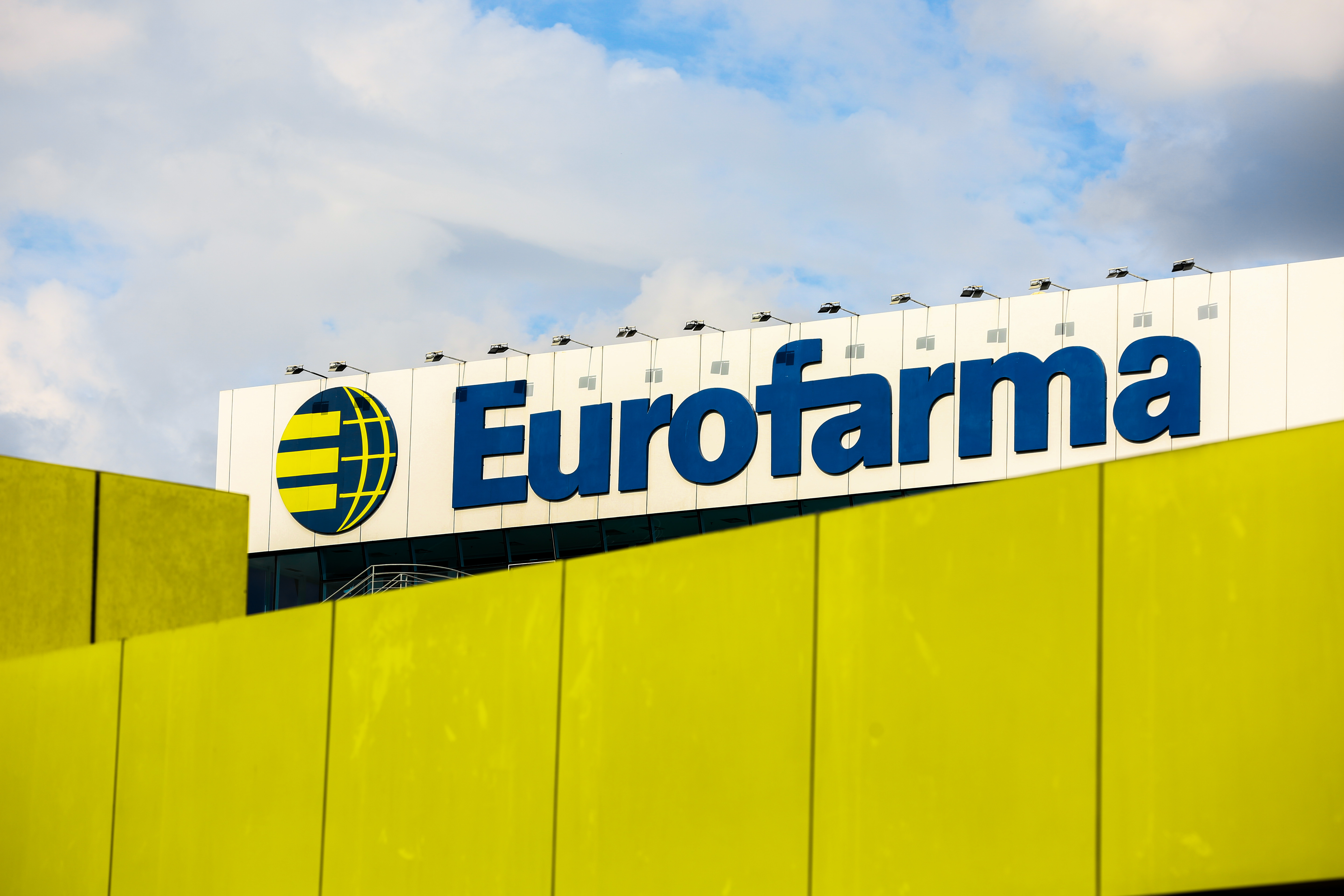
- Type: Sociedade Anônima
- Industry: Biopharmaceuticals
- Founded: 1972; 54 years ago
- Headquarters: São Paulo, Brazil
- Area served: Worldwide
- Key people: Maurízio Billi, CEO
- Products: Pharmaceutical drugs, vaccines
- Revenue: ▲ R$ 5.7 billion (2020)
- Number of employees: 7,600 (2020)
- Subsidiaries: Magabi Pesquisas e Farmacêutica; Supera Rx Medicamentos
- Website: www.eurofarma.com.br

Eurofarma (Eurofarma Laboratórios S.A.) is a Brazilian multinational corporation engaged in biopharmaceutical manufacturing and is one of the largest medicine producers in Brazil and Latin America. Founded in 1972, Eurofarma offers generic, oncologic and veterinary medications. Within Brazil the company is responsible for about 2000 products, representing 66% of the total market.

Eurofarma has active operations in 20 countries, with factories in Brazil, Argentina, Bolivia, Chile, Colombia, Ecuador, Guatemala, Mexico, Mozambique, Paraguay, Peru, Uruguay and Venezuela.

== About ==
Eurofarma is a multinational company with 100% Brazilian capital. Eurofarma Group operates in the healthcare sector, producing and marketing products and services. With a diversified presence, it operates in all the main segments, such as Medical Prescription, Over-the-Counter, Generic, Hospital and Oncology, in addition to the export and outsourcing of medicines. In Brazil it offers over 2,000 products, serves 42 medical specialties and covers over 140 therapeutic classes.

Eurofarma Group is present in 22 countries, covering 100% of Latin America, some African countries and the USA. In 2023, it generated net sales of R$ 9.1 billion and employs more than 12,000 employees. It concluded 2023 with two important acquisitions: Genfar, Sanofi's generics operation headquartered in Colombia and with affiliates in Ecuador and Peru, and 7 Sanofi assets for the markets of Brazil, Colombia, Mexico, Argentina and Uruguay. The company invested R$680 million in 2023 and has more than 350 projects in its pipeline and expansion plans for important global markets.

The Group has over 12,000 employees, with over 7,000 in Brazil. It also has one of the largest sales and medical advertising forces in the market, with over 4,900 employees, who make approximately 630,000 medical contacts per month.

== COVID-19 vaccine ==
On 26 August 2021, Pfizer Inc. and BioNTech, the developers of the COMIRNATY vaccine against COVID-19, announced a partnership with Eurofarma to manufacture their vaccine in Brazil from 2022. Eurofarma will produce at least 100 million doses annually for distribution in the Latin American & Caribbean region.

The agreement is also part of an effort launched by the World Health Organization and the Pan American Health Organization in partnership with the Brazilian government to increase the number of vaccine doses in other countries of the region through the WHO's COVAX Facility mechanism.

== Sports Sponsorships ==
Having been in the Stock Car Brasil, the most important in Brazilian motorsports, for seventeen years, Eurofarma has maintained its own team, Eurofarma-RC. Ricardo Mauricio has been defending the team since 2009. In 2020, he became a three-time champion. In 2024, Eurofarma completed 19 years of uninterrupted sponsorship in the category.

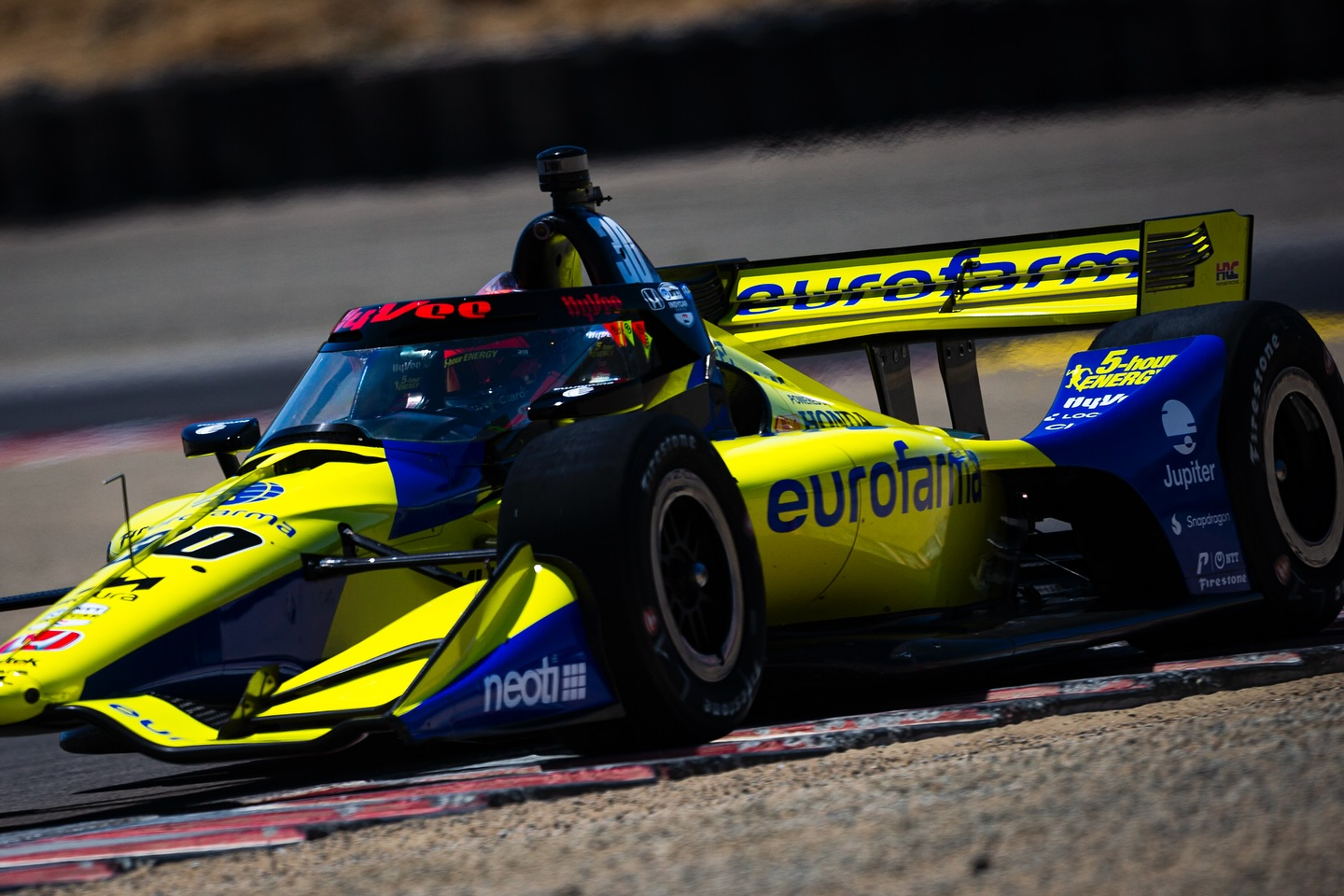
Special paint job for Pietro Fittipaldi's RLL #30 car, during the Laguna Seca stage of the 2024 IndyCar Series, paying tribute to Eurofarma.

Eurofarma also recently sponsored the NBB All-Star Game.

The company also sponsors drivers Enzo Fittipaldi, who competes in Formula 2; and Pietro Fittipaldi, who competes in the IndyCar Series. At the Laguna Seca stage of the 2024 IndyCar Series season, a new paint job was presented for Pietro's RLL #30 car, featuring Eurofarma colors. The driver's overalls and the car itself are similar to those used by the Eurofarma-RC Team in Stock Car Brasil.
