= Águas de Santa Bárbara =

- Municipality
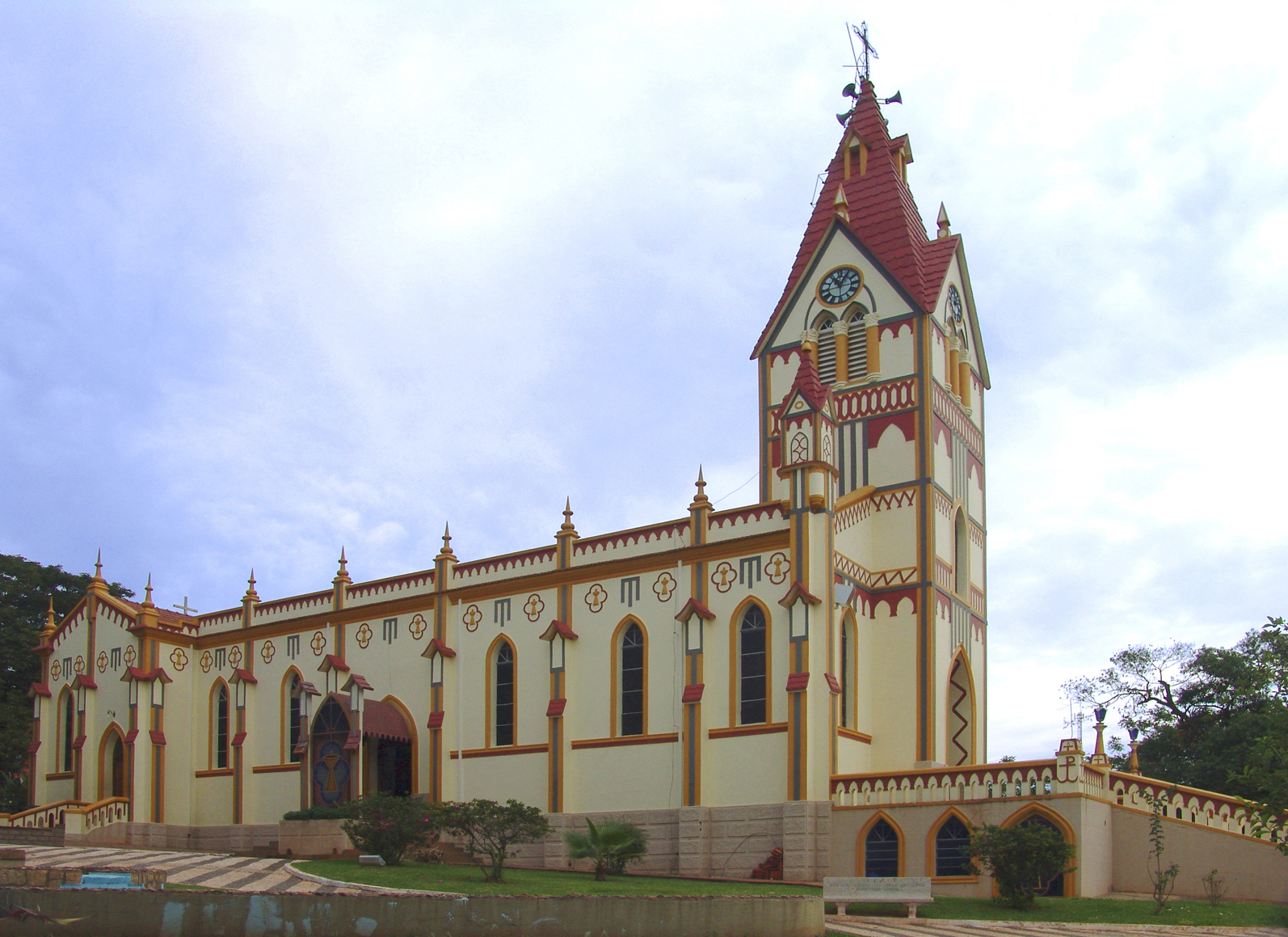

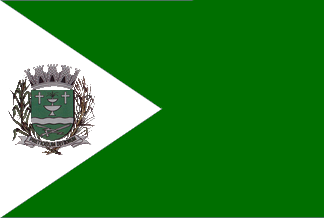
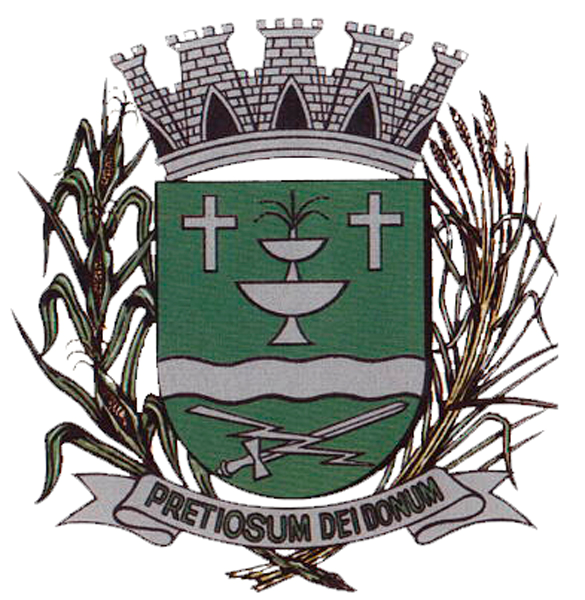
- Flag Coat of arms

- Location in São Paulo state

- Location in Brazil
- Coordinates: 22°52′52″S 49°14′13″W
- Country: Brazil
- Region: Southeast
- State: São Paulo

Area
  - Total: 405 km^{2} (156 sq mi)

Population (2020)
  - Total: 6,109
  - Density: 15.1/km^{2} (39.1/sq mi)
- Time zone: UTC−3 (BRT)

Águas de Santa Bárbara is a municipality in São Paulo, Brazil. The population is 6,109 (2020 est.) in an area of 405 km^{2} (156 sq mi). It was founded in 1868.

== Demographics ==
Historical population (municipality)
Year	Population	%±
1920	8,192
1940	8,446	3.1%
1950	5,372	−36.4%
1960	5,078	−5.5%
1970	4,723	−7.0%
1980	4,632	−1.9%
1991	6,049	30.6%
2000	5,224	−13.6%
2010	5,601	7.2%
2022	7,177	28.1%

== Media ==
In telecommunications, the city was served by Companhia de Telecomunicações do Estado de São Paulo until 1973, when it began to be served by Telecomunicações de São Paulo. In July 1998, this company was acquired by Telefónica, which adopted the Vivo brand in 2012.

The company is currently an operator of cell phones, fixed lines, internet (fiber optics/4G) and television (satellite and cable).

== See also ==
- List of municipalities in São Paulo
- Interior of São Paulo
