= Alpla =

Austrian plastics manufacturer

ALPLA Group
- Company type: GmbH & Co KG
- Industry: Plastic packaging systems; bottles, caps and injection moulded parts, preforms
- Founded: 1955; 71 years ago
- Founder: Alwin and Helmuth Lehner
- Headquarters: Hard, Austria
- Area served: Worldwide
- Key people: Philipp Lehner; CEO Nicolas Lehner; CCO Ricardo Rehm; CFO Klaus Allgäuer; CTO Walter Ritzer; COO
- Revenue: € 5.20 billion (2025)
- Number of employees: 25,440 (2025)
- Subsidiaries: 206 production plants in 45 countries
- Website: alpla.com

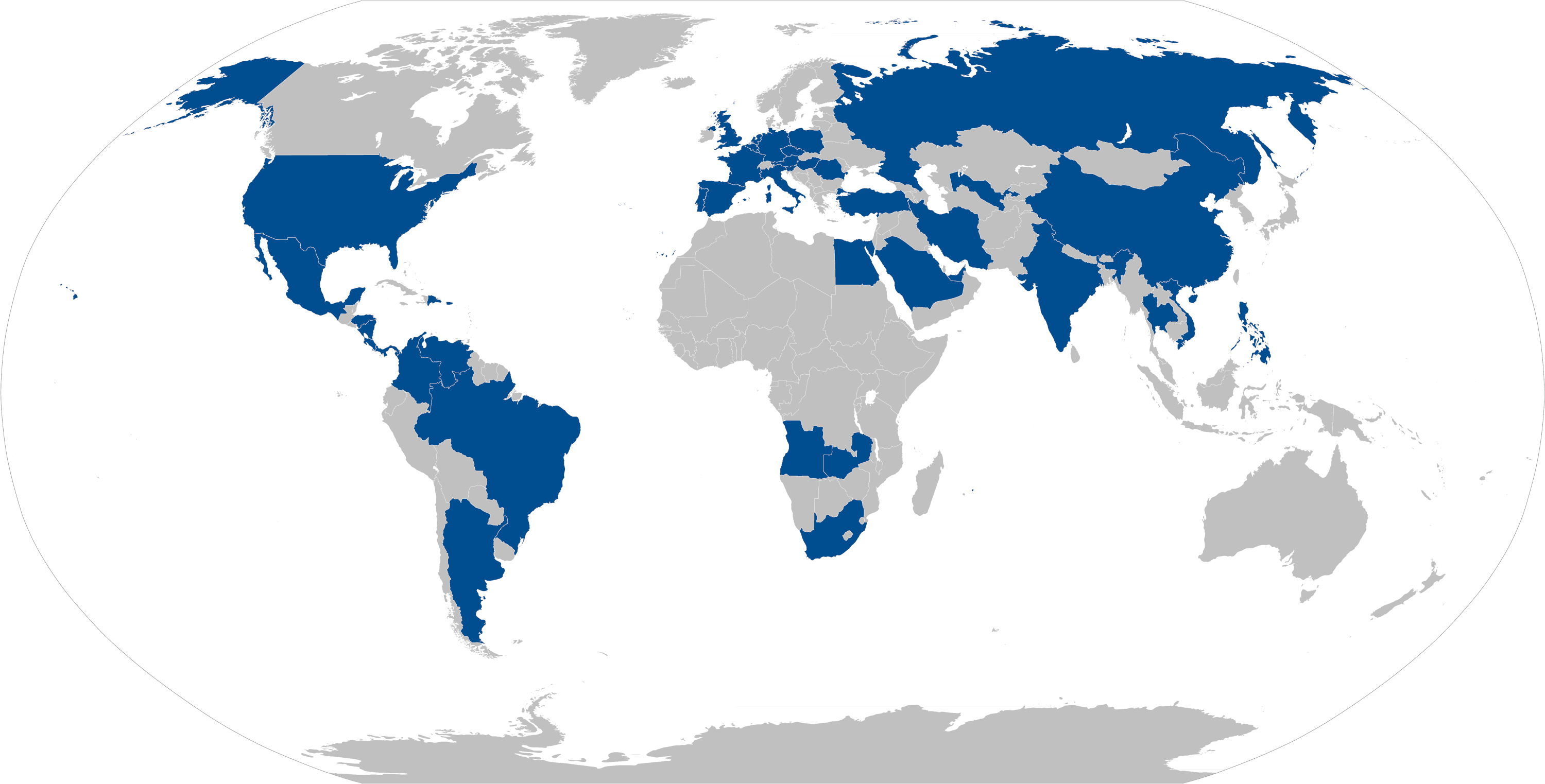
ALPLA group worldwide

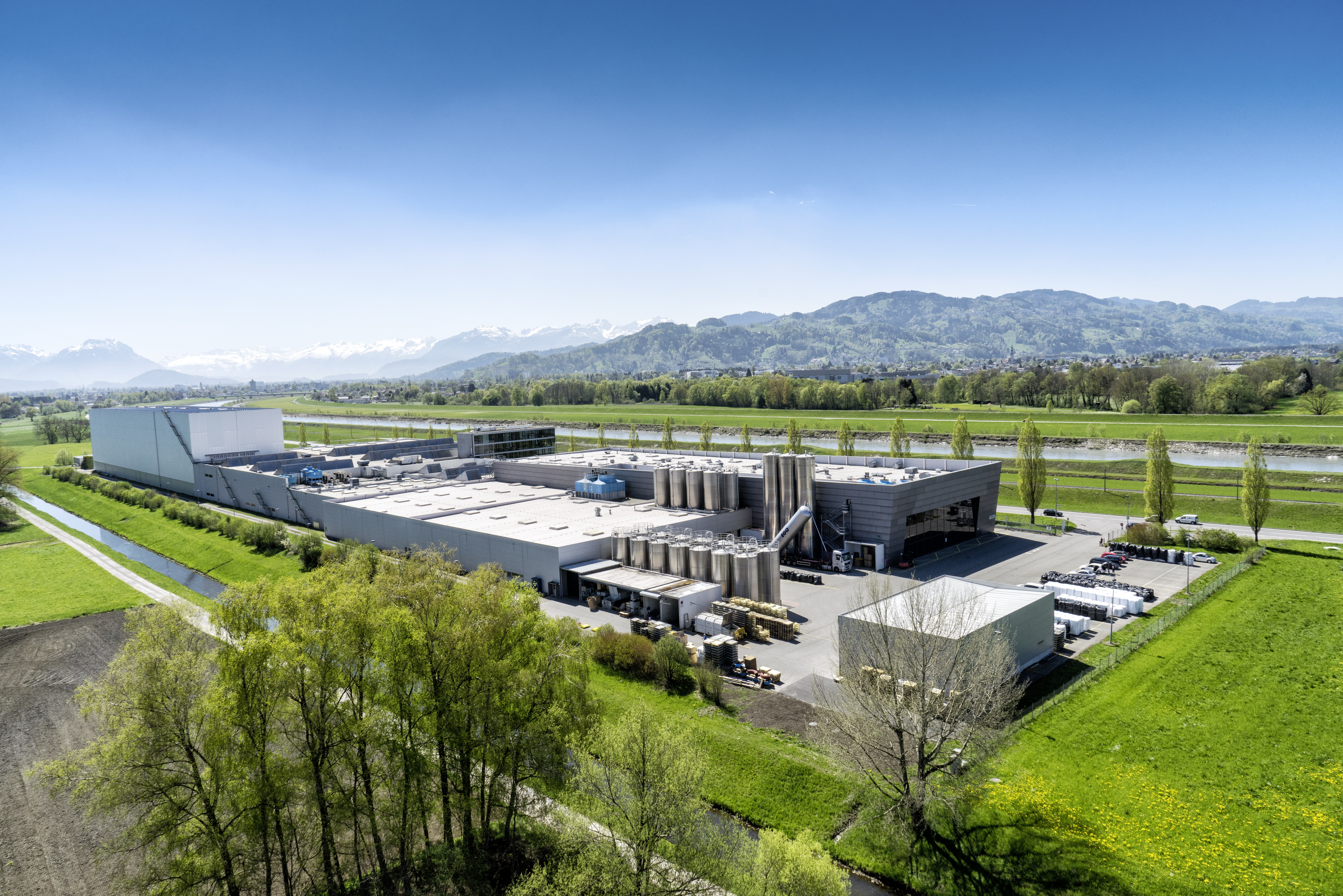
Factory Fußach

ALPLA, otherwise ALPLA Group is an Austrian, international acting plastics manufacturer and plastics recycler headquartered in Hard, specialising in blow-moulded bottles and caps, injection-moulded parts, preforms and tubes. It is one of the largest producers of rigid plastic packaging solutions worldwide, with a total of 206 production plants in 45 countries worldwide, approx. 25,440 employees and annual sales of € 5.2 billion in 2025. In early 2021, the ALPLA Group announced that it would invest an average of 50 million euros a year until 2025 in the ongoing expansion of its recycling activities.

== History ==
The company was founded in 1955 as "Alpenplastik Lehner Alwin OHG" by the brothers Alwin (1932-2018) and Helmuth Lehner (1930-1978). After starting with the injection moulding production of plastic cups, ALPLA produced plastic bottles for the first time in 1958. In the same year, the company began mechanical engineering and developed the Alplamat, the first extrusion blow moulding machine for the production of plastic bottles. The company's first international site was opened in Markdorf, Germany, in 1964, followed by San Joaquin in Venezuela in 1968.

Since 1985, ALPLA has also been producing packaging directly at customers' bottling plants. The first in-house plant was opened at the Henkel company in Lomazzo. In the same year, ALPLA developed the first two-stage PET bottle and replaced the plastic PVC with PET. This was followed in 1990 by the development of bottles made from recycled plastic. After 42 years, founder Alwin Lehner handed over the management of the company to his son Günther Lehner in 1997. Ten years later, ALPLA opened its 100th plant in Shanghai. ALPLA is still family-owned today and has been managed by third-generation CEO Philipp Lehner since 2021.

ALPLA has been operating recycling plants since becoming the majority shareholder of the Austrian PET Recycling Team GmbH (PRT) in 2010. As a joint venture partner of The Coca-Cola Company, the company has held a stake in a Mexican recycling plant since 2005. Currently (2023), the international recycling network includes 13 plants, including 4 joint ventures, in 9 countries: Germany, Italy, Mexico, Austria, Poland, Romania, Spain, South Africa and Thailand. The installed and projected annual recycling capacity worldwide is 266,000 tons of recycled PET (rPET) and 84,000 tons of recycled HDPE (rHDPE). In 2023, the company founded its own recycling division, ALPLArecycling.

Since 2016, ALPLA has also been producing cleanroom-certified bottles, containers and closures for the pharmaceutical industry. ALPLApharma division was founded in 2019. ALPLA also entered the market for canisters and buckets in 2021 with the acquisition of the Austrian packaging company Wolf Plastics and founded the ALPLAindustrial brand in 2023. The injection moulding business has been bundled in the ALPLAinject division since 2024.

== Company ==
ALPLA builds factories around the world close to or as so-called "in-house plants" directly in the customers' production facilities. This enables the company to reduce transportation distances and costs for packaging. A total of 68 ALPLA plants are operated directly at the customer's bottling plant.

Through in-house research and development, particularly in the area of extrusion blow molding, as well as the use of different manufacturing processes, ALPLA implements customer requirements in a targeted manner. The company uses extrusion blow molding, injection molding, injection stretch blow molding and injection blow molding technologies to produce plastic packaging. One of ALPLA's core competencies is the system supply of plastic bottles with closures. This ranges from bottle design and production, including mould making, to fully automatic packaging machines.

ALPLA was a pioneer in the switch from PVC to PET in the form of the first two-stage PET bottle. The company is also involved in the research, development and production of alternative, bio-based and biodegradable packaging materials. In 2019, the company founded the joint venture Paboco (Paper Bottle Company) together with the Swedish paper packaging company Billerud AB. In October 2023, ALPLA acquired all shares in the joint venture partner and has been the majority owner of Paboco ever since. The bio-based paper bottle has been in series production since 2024.

In the Swedish start-up Blue Ocean Closures, ALPLA and the US company Glatfelter are involved in the development of closures made from cellulose fibers. ALPLA has been producing home-compostable coffee capsules made from biodegradable plastic under the Blue Circle Packaging brand since 2021.

== Apprenticeship ==
ALPLA has been training apprentices in nine different professions in its own Future Corners for many years. The apprenticeship period varies depending on the profession and usually lasts three to four years. Worldwide, 271 apprentices are currently being trained in Austria, Germany, Mexico, China, India, Poland, South Africa and Romania. ALPLA trains apprentices according to the dual system. This means that apprentices are trained in parallel in the company and at vocational school. Due to the lack of practical vocational training in countries with important production sites for the company, the Austrian model of apprenticeship training was copied.
