= Itatinga =

- Municipality
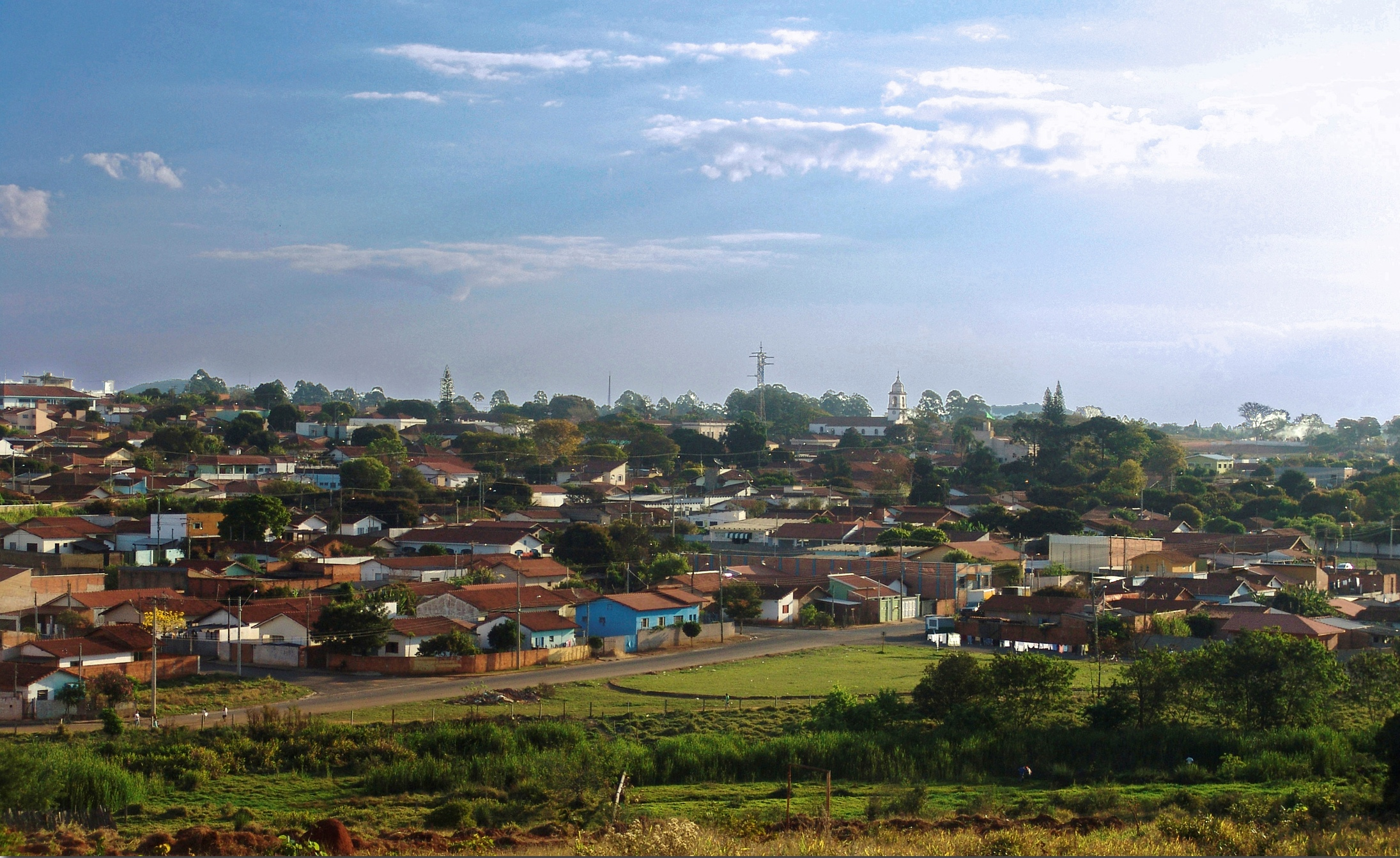

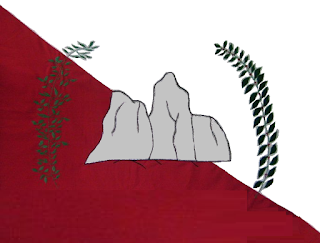
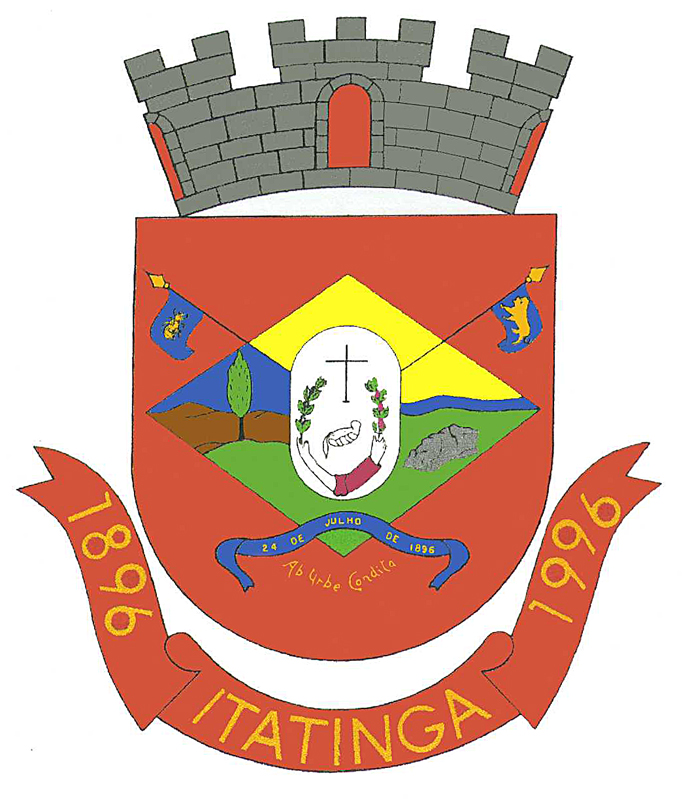
- Flag Coat of arms

- Location in São Paulo state

- Location in Brazil
- Coordinates: 23°6′6″S 48°36′57″W
- Country: Brazil
- Region: Southeast
- State: São Paulo

Area
  - Total: 980 km^{2} (380 sq mi)

Population (2020)
  - Total: 20,921
  - Density: 21/km^{2} (55/sq mi)
- Time zone: UTC−3 (BRT)

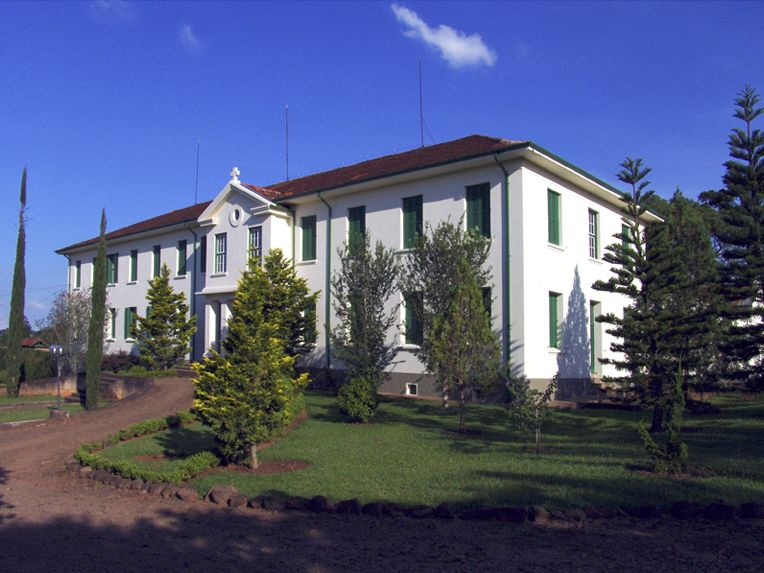
Brazilian church of Abadia de Nossa Senhora da Assumpção.

Itatinga is a municipality in the state of São Paulo in Brazil. The population is 20,921 (2020 est.) in an area of 980 km^{2}. The elevation is 845 m. Its name comes from the Tupi language and means "white stone".

== Media ==
In telecommunications, the city was served by Companhia Telefônica Brasileira until 1973, when it began to be served by Telecomunicações de São Paulo. In July 1998, this company was acquired by Telefónica, which adopted the Vivo brand in 2012.

The company is currently an operator of cell phones, fixed lines, internet (fiber optics/4G) and television (satellite and cable).

== See also ==
- List of municipalities in São Paulo

== Demographics ==
Itatinga is a small-to-medium sized municipality in São Paulo's interior with an estimated population of 19,462 inhabitants in 2025."Cities and States - IBGE". IBGE. According to the 2022 census, the municipality had 19,070 inhabitants. The territorial area is 979.526 km² with a demographic density of 19.46 inhabitants/km²."Municipal Panorama". IBGE.

The school enrollment rate for children aged 6-14 is high at 99.01%, demonstrating good educational coverage. The municipal human development index (HDI) is 0.706 (2010 data), indicating adequate human development.

== Economy ==
Itatinga's economy is diversified, with emphasis on agricultural activities, small industries, and commerce. The per capita GDP is R$ 31,523.91 (2023 data), reflecting municipal economic solidity."Economic Indicators - IBGE". IBGE. The services sector is important, with retail and wholesale trade serving the local population and neighboring municipalities.

== Tourism ==
Itatinga offers potential for rural and nature tourism. The municipality has natural landscapes characteristic of São Paulo's interior, with rural properties welcoming visitors. Tourism based on local gastronomy is an emerging opportunity.

== Infrastructure ==
Itatinga is connected through state highways facilitating regional access. The municipality has adequate healthcare, education, and commerce infrastructure. Municipal water, energy, and telecommunications services are available. Urban infrastructure is planned to meet population needs.

== Education ==
Itatinga offers kindergarten, elementary, and high school education through public and private institutions. The municipality has quality schools serving the student population. The high school enrollment rate demonstrates municipal commitment to education. Access to higher education is facilitated by proximity to universities.
