= Ferrovia Paulista S/A =

Brazilian freight and passenger railway company

- FEPASA
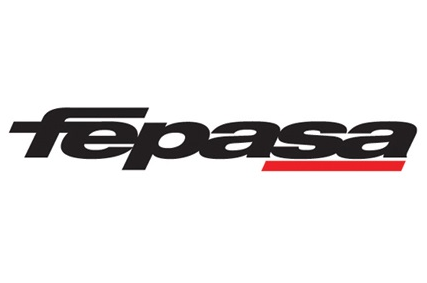

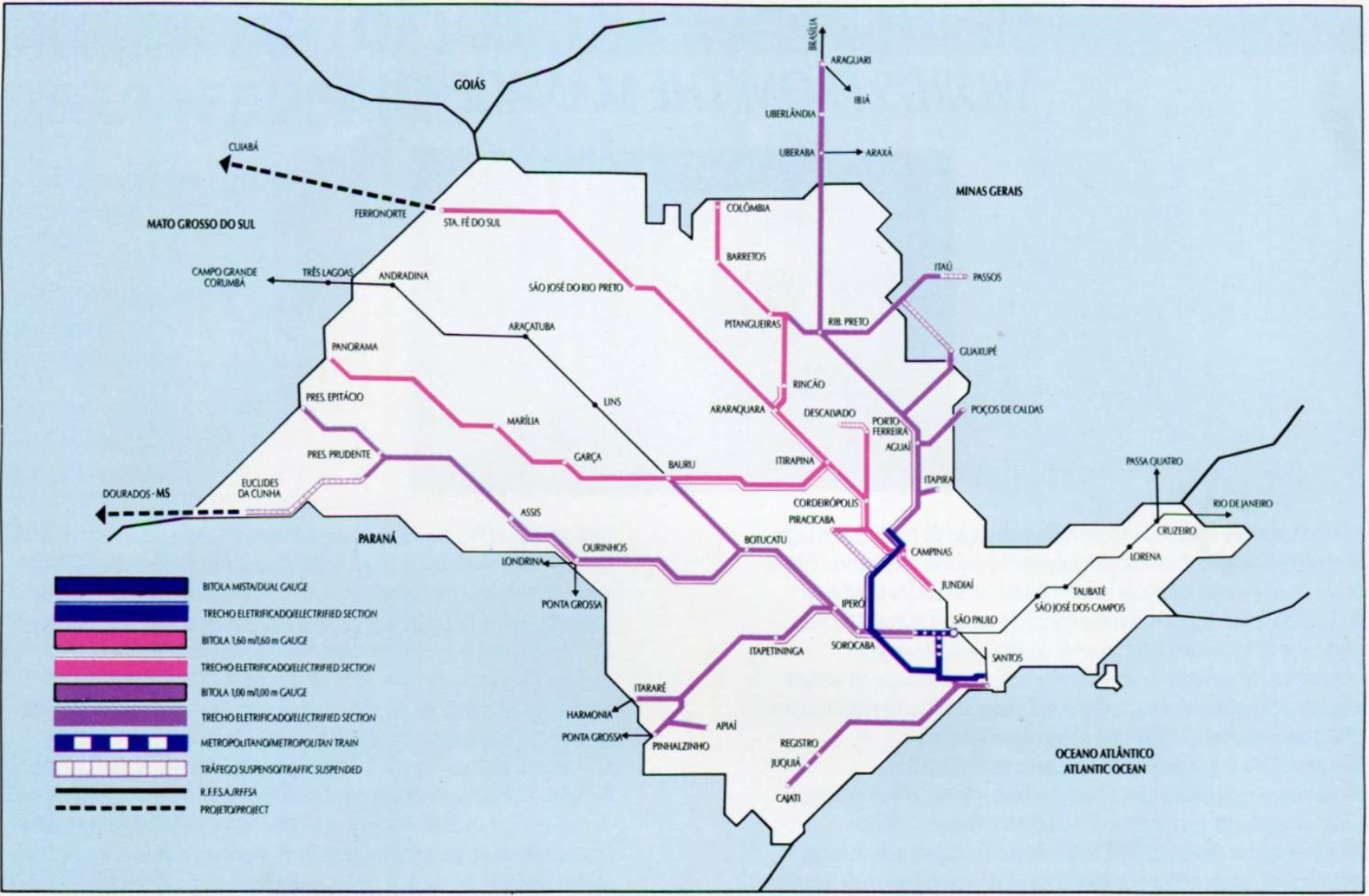
- Map of FEPASA's network, 1989

Overview
- Main regions: São Paulo; Minas Gerais
- Fleet: 519 locomotives; 17,200 wagons; 1,191 cars
- Dates of operation: October 28, 1971–May 29, 1998
- Predecessors: CPEF; CMEF; EFS; EFA; EFSPM
- Successors: CPTM; Ferroban

Technical
- Previous gauge: 1,000 mm (3 ft 3 3/8 in); 1,600 mm (5 ft 3 in)
- Electrification: 3 kV DC catenary
- Length: 5,163 km (3,208 mi)
- Operating speed: 40 km/h (25 mph)

Ferrovia Paulista S/A (FEPASA) was a São Paulo state-owned freight and passenger railway company, created by merging Paulista Railroads Company (CPEF), Mogiana Railroads Company (CMEF), Sorocabana Railroad (EFS), Araraquara Railroad (EFA), and São Paulo-Minas Railroad (EFSPM). It remained in activity from October 1971 until May 1998, when it was extinguished and incorporated into the Federal Railway Network S/A (RFFSA).

== History ==
=== Background ===
Despite the great contribution of the São Paulo railroads to the development of the state of São Paulo until the middle of the last century, after 1945 they entered a process of stagnation and obsolescence due to lack of technical, operational, and physical adaptation. As a way to reverse this situation, Governor Carvalho Pinto opted for the creation of a single company, an idea which began to take shape in 1961 when the São Paulo Engineering Institute, on its initiative, suggested the formation of the Paulista Railway Network (RFP), being presented in 1962 with a message sent to the Legislative Assembly proposing the unification of São Paulo's railroads as an economic measure, since there were five different state-owned railroads in the state. There was a rejection of this proposal, being forwarded again in 1966 and again rejected by the Legislative Assembly.

On May 29, 1967, with Decrees Nos. 48,028 and 48,029, Governor Abreu Sodré took the first step by transferring the administration of the EFA to the CPEF, and the administration of the EFSPM to the CMEF. Then, following the example of what was already occurring with CPEF and CMEF, the governor, through the Decree-Law of September 18, 1969, transformed the other railroads owned by him into joint-stock companies.

=== Foundation ===
The consolidation of the railroads' unification occurred during Laudo Natel's government, when he sanctioned the creation of the new company through Decree No. 10,410 of October 28, 1971, making FEPASA official. Instead of a merger among all the companies, as the letter of the act stated, it was decided in an Extraordinary General Meeting called for November 10, 1971, to previously change the corporate name of "Paulista Railroads Company" to "FEPASA - Ferrovia Paulista S/A", followed by the incorporation of the total assets of CMEF, the EFA, the EFS and the EFSPM to FEPASA. Soon afterwards the four companies were declared extinct.

The unification was intended to make possible the centralization of investment program studies and coordination of railroad services, the centralization of imports, accounting and budgeting; uniformity of service and material, as well as the redeployment of existing material and better utilization of personnel.

Railway Companies in 1971	Foundation	Extension (km)	Passengers Long Distance (x 1,000)	Passengers Suburbs (x 1,000)	Loads (x 1,000 of TKU)	Locomotives (of all types)	Freight wagons	Cars (including EMU's and railcars)
CPEF	1868	1,270	8,038	—	656,7	169	4,956	328
CMEF	1872	1,445	1,477	—	579,6	92	5 350*	255
EFS	1875	2,017	5,466	27,822	1,914,2	233	8,590	639
EFA	1895	439,6	1,447	—	87,7	20	614	107
EFSPM	1890	134	101	—	30	18	189	29
Total	—	5,305,6	16,529	27,822	3,273,6	532	19,699	1,358

- Including wagons from other companies rented to CMEF.
- TKU – Brazilian physical unit that measures effort. It can be understood as the useful tons (i.e., the weight of the cargo alone, without considering the tare weight of the equipment used) transported per kilometer.

== Operational structure ==
=== CEOs ===
- 1st – Jaul Pires de Castro, from 1971 to 1975
- 2nd – Walter Pedro Bodini, from 1975 to 1979
- 3rd – Chafic Jacob, from 1979 to 1983
- 4th – Cyro Antonio de Laurenza Filho, from 1983 to 1984
- 5th – Sebastião Hermano Leite Cintra, from 1984 to 1987
- 6th – Antônio Carlos Rios Corral, from 1987 to 1990
- 7th – Sérgio Lorena de Mello, from 1990 to 1991
- 8th – Walter Pedro Bodini, from 1991 to 1994
- 9th – Oliver Hossepian Salles de Lima, from 1994 to 1995
- 10th – Renato Casale Pavan, from 1995 to 1997
- 11th – Silvio Augusto Minciotti, from 1997 to 1998

=== Number of employees ===
In 1970, the number of employees on the forming railroads was as follows: EFS (17,622), CPEF (11,185), CMEF (5,935), EFA (3,179) and EFSPM (603), totaling 38,524 employees. By 1971, the company's railroad workforce was down to 36,665 people,[9] and by 1972 it was drastically reduced to 29,347 people with the transfer of employees to various sectors of the state government.

This policy of reducing the operational staff was constant until the early 1980s, so that in 1982 the number of employees was 19,874, almost half compared to 1970. From then on, the staff was kept stable until, aiming to meet the National Privatization Plan, a process of reduction began in 1994, decreasing the number of employees from 17,029 to 13,432 in 1995, 8,971 in 1996, 8,453 in 1997 and, finally 6,448 in 1998.

=== Regional Units ===
FEPASA's Regional Units (UR)

FEPASA had eight regional units (UR), which were as follows:

- UR-1 – Sorocaba
- UR-2 – Botucatu
- UR-3 – Bauru
- UR-4 – Araraquara
- UR-5 – Campinas
- UR-6 – Ribeirão Preto
- UR-7 – Santos
- DRM (Metropolitan Regional Division) – São Paulo, former UR-Subúrbio

== Expansion ==
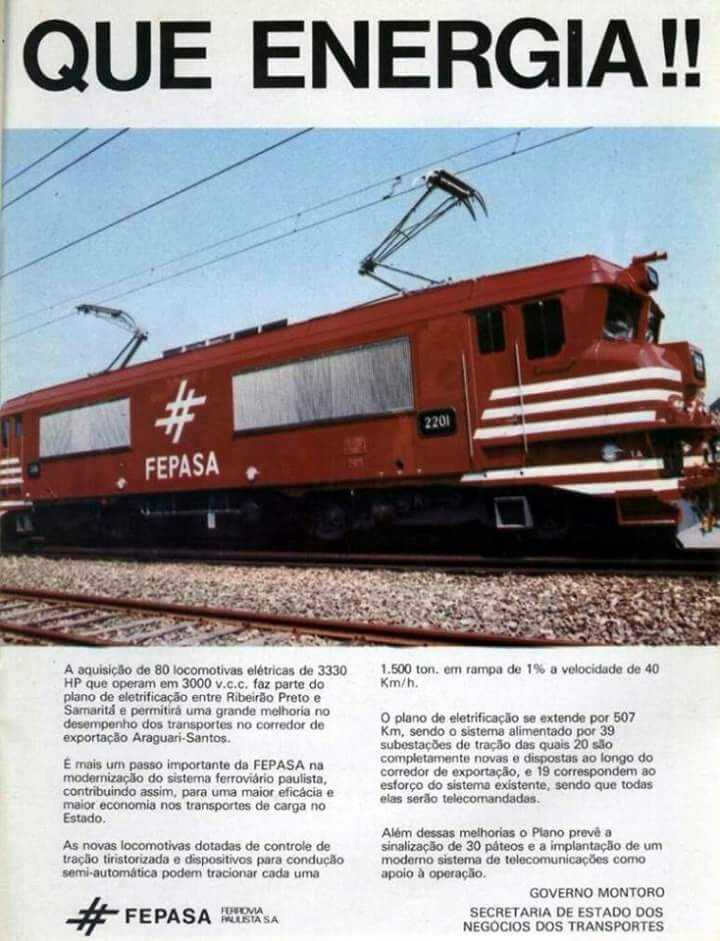
FEPASA's advertisement about investments in the Araguari-Santos Export Corridor, 1986.

The 1970s and 1980s were periods of major investments in the railroad, when, with the support of entities such as the World Bank, the National Bank for Economic and Social Development (BNDES), export promotion entities, and international credit banks, programs were developed to improve and expand the network.

In order to keep up with the development of the state, FEPASA adopted the route-based operational planning methodology, which was more adequate to the demands of the railroad. This allowed for the improvement of rolling stock management and the signing of risk contracts with large customers, involving cargo guarantees by the customers and transportation volume and terms by the railroad. Consequently, many stations and stops were closed, while others considered high production received investments.

The main FEPASA project was the Araguari-Santos Export Corridor, which included the rectification of the route in the old Mogiana Mainline (giving access to the Paulínia Refinery terminal); in addition to the rectification of the route and addition of the dual gauge in the old Sorocabana line, which goes from Campinas to Santos, crossing the Serra do Mar and giving access to the left bank of the Port of Santos. Another important project was the retaking of the Variante Itirapina-Santa Gertrudes, in the early 1970s, which shortened by almost 5 km the distance between these cities, and modernized part of the route of the old Paulista Mainline. This new branch line was completed in 1976. Other projects of the company sewere the Juquiá-Cajati Extension, as an extension of the Santos-Juquiá Line in 1981 and a new connection with the South Mainline of the RFFSA network, through the construction of the Ramal Apiaí in 1973 and the Ramal Pinhalzinho in 1976.

As for the rolling stock, 148 new locomotives and hundreds of new wagons were purchased to replace the obsolete ones. The investments resulted in a significant growth in rail transportation, which grew from 8 million tons/year in 1976 to 22 million tons/year in 1986, a record in the company's history.

== Railway network ==
FEPASA took over the metre-gauge lines of Sorocabana (2,016 km), Mogiana (1,744 km) and São Paulo-Minas (133 km), and the broad-gauge lines of Paulista (1,225 km) and Araraquara (431 km), totaling 5,549 km of railway lines in 1970. It also rectified several sections of the busiest lines, including electrification and implementation of dual gauge, in addition to building other branch lines (ramais and variantes). After the reforms and constructions in its network it now had 5,163 km of railroad lines, of which 3,337 km were mainlines and 1,826 km secondary lines or branch lines; not counting the 1,260 km of detours owned by the railroad and 292 km of private detours, totaling 6,715 km.

=== 1.00 m gauge (metre-gauge) ===
- FEPASA West Line (DRM) – former EFS, electrified.
- FEPASA South Line ( DRM) – former EFS, electrified.
- São Paulo-Presidente Epitácio Mainline (UR-1 and UR-2) – former EFS, electrified from São Paulo to Assis.
- Ramal Itararé (UR-1) – former EFS, electrified from Iperó to Itapetininga, had the final Itapeva-Itararé line deactivated in the 1990s.
- Ramal Apiaí (UR-1) – built by FEPASA and inaugurated in 1974.
- Ramal Pinhalzinho (UR-1) – built by FEPASA and inaugurated in 1976.
- Ramal Bauru (UR-2) – former EFS.
- Ramal Dourados (UR-2) – former EFS, it was deactivated in the 1980s.
- Ramal Campinas (UR-5) – former EFS, it was deactivated in the 1980s but a section was used by Campinas LRT in the 1990s.
- Ramal Piracicaba (Sorocabana) (UR-5) – former EFS, it was deactivated in the 1980s.
- Campinas-Araguari Mainline (UR-5 and UR-6) – former CMEF, the Campinas-Jaguariúna initial line was deactivated in the 1970s, and the remaining line was all rectified by FEPASA, being built the branch lines Guedes-Mato Seco, Lagoa-Tambaú, Tambaú-Bento Quirino, Bento Quirino-Entroncamento and Entroncamento-Amoroso Costa. It is part of the Araguari-Santos Export Corridor.
- Variante Boa Vista-Guedes (UR-5) – built by FEPASA to replace the initial Campinas-Jaguariúna section of the mainline, it was inaugurated between 1972 and 1973 and is part of the Araguari-Santos Export Corridor.
- Ramal Replan (UR-5) – built by FEPASA and inaugurated in 1972, it is directly connected to the Araguari-Santos Export Corridor.
- Ramal Itapira (UR-5) – former CMEF, it was deactivated in the 1980s.
- Ramal Caldas (UR-5) – former CMEF.
- Ramal Guaxupé (UR-5) – former CMEF, it was deactivated in the 1970s.
- Ramal Passos (UR-5 and UR-6) – former CMEF, had the initial section Guaxupé-São Sebastião do Paraíso deactivated in the 1970s and the rest of the branch was deactivated in the 1990s.
- São Simão-São Sebastião do Paraíso Mainline (UR-6) – former EFSPM, it was deactivated in the 1990s.
- Ramal Rio Grande (UR-6) – former CMEF, it was deactivated in the 1980s.
- Ramal Sertãozinho (UR-6) – former CMEF.
- Ramal Guatapará (UR-6) – former CMEF, it was deactivated in the 1970s.
- Santos-Juquiá Line (UR-7) – former EFS.
- Juquiá-Cajati Extension (UR-7) – built by FEPASA and inaugurated in 1981.

=== 1.60 m gauge (broad-gauge) ===
- Itirapina-Panorama West Mainline (UR-3) – former CPEF, electrified from Itirapina to Bauru, had part of the line rectified by FEPASA, and the Bauru-Garça Alternative was built, inaugurated in 1976.
- Araraquara-Santa Fé do Sul Mainline (UR-4) – former EFA.
- Jundiaí-Colombia Mainline (UR-4 and UR-5) – former CPEF, electrified from Jundiaí to Rincão, had part of the line rectified by FEPASA, being built the Variante Itirapina-Santa Gertrudes, inaugurated in 1976.
- Ramal Piracicaba (Paulista) (UR-5) – former CPEF, it was deactivated in the 1990s.
- Ramal Descalvado (UR-5) – former CPEF, it was deactivated in the 1980s.
- Ramal Santa Cruz das Palmeiras (UR-5) – former CPEF, it was deactivated in the 1970s.

=== 1.00 m and 1.60 m gauge (dual gauge) ===
- Variante Boa Vista-Guaianã (UR-5) – built and electrified by FEPASA, one line was inaugurated in 1974 and another in 1985. It is part of the Araguari-Santos Export Corridor.
- Mairinque-Santos Line (UR-1 and UR-7) – former EFS, it is part of the Araguari-Santos Export Corridor.
- Ramal Perequê (UR-7) – built by FEPASA to give direct access to the right bank of the Port of Santos via the Santos-Jundiaí Line of RFFSA, it was inaugurated in 1978 and is part of the Araguari-Santos Export Corridor.
- Ramal Conceiçãozinha (UR-7) – built by FEPASA and RFFSA on the left bank of the Port of Santos, was inaugurated in 1981 and is part of the Araguari-Santos Export Corridor.

== Railway Stations ==
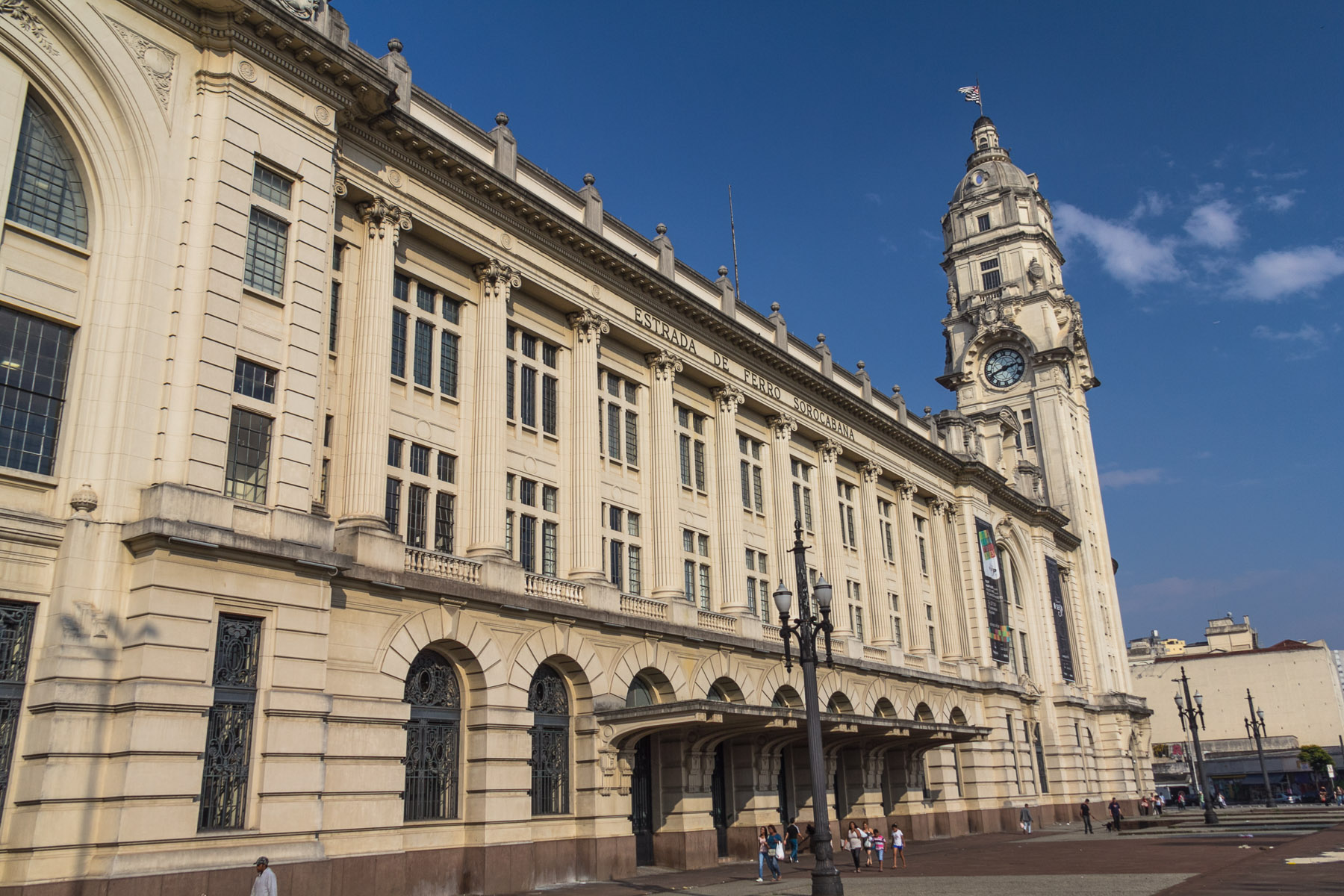
Júlio Prestes Station, in the capital.

Of the approximately 323 stations on the entire grid (1974), only 32 stood out as the main composers of the rail system:

- Júlio Prestes Station – FEPASA Headquarters
- Barra Funda Station
- Presidente Altino Station – yard and EMU workshops
- Mairinque Station – workshops
- Sorocaba Station – workshops
- Botucatu Station – workshops
- Ourinhos Station – fuel terminal
- Assis Station – workshops and bulk terminal
- Presidente Prudente Station – fuel terminal
- Boa Vista Nova Station (Campinas) – line transfer and bulk terminal (CNAGA)
- Paulínia Station – workshops
- REPLAN Yard – fuel terminal
- Casa Branca Station – bulk terminal
- Ribeirão Preto Station – fuel terminal
- Uberaba Station – workshops
- Uberlândia Station – bulk terminal
- Ana Costa Station (Santos)
- Port of Santos
- Jundiaí Station – RFFSA transfer and workshops
- Campinas Station – workshops
- Cordeirópolis Station – line transfer (deactivated in the 1980s)
- Rio Claro Station – workshops
- Itirapina Station – line transfer
- São Carlos Station – depots and workshops (deactivated in the 1980s)
- Araraquara Station – line transfer, workshops and grain terminal (CEAGESP)
- São José do Rio Preto Station
- Paulista Classification Yard (Bauru)
- Bauru Station – transfer of the line, RFFSA transfer, fuel terminal and bulk terminal

== Locomotives and rolling stock ==
Upon its 1971 establishment, FEPASA had 519 locomotives, 1,191 long-distance passenger cars, 102 electric trains for urban passenger transport and 17,200 freight wagons of various types, received from Sorocabana, Paulista, Mogiana, Araraquara and São Paulo-Minas. Later FEPASA acquired new and used locomotives, EMU and mainly freight wagons.

=== Locomotive fleet ===
Initially, FEPASA had the following motive power:

- Narrow-gauge locomotives: 243 locomotives (167 diesel and 76 electric) were received from Sorocabana and 91 diesel locomotives from Mogiana, totaling 334 locomotives.
- Broad-gauge locomotives: 168 locomotives (79 diesel and 89 electric) were received from Paulista and 17 diesel locomotives from Araraquara, totaling 185 locomotives.

FEPASA received a total of 519 locomotives (354 diesel and 165 electric) from its predecessors. As the railroad continued with modernization, 164 of these locomotives were written off between 1971 and 1991, while 136 GE U20C diesel locomotives of both gauges were acquired in the period 1974–1979, this being the largest acquisition in Fepasa's history.

FEPASA also acquired 10 used GE 2-C+C-2 electric locomotives from RFFSA in 1981, 8 of which were completely rebuilt while 2 were retained for parts. Also part of the railroad's modernization process was the electrification of the entire Araguari-Santos Export Corridor, for which 80 Alstom EC-362 electric locomotives of both gauges were to be acquired, the first arriving from France in October 1987. However, these proved difficult to maintain and the railroad's substations could not produce sufficient power output for their operation, and ultimately only two of the 80 EC-362's delivered had ever been assembled and put into operation.

In March 1992, FEPASA had a total of 503 locomotives (357 diesel and 146 electric), and had acquired an additional 7 GE C30-7A diesel locomotives that year from the Cutrale Quintela company.

Between 1992 and 1998, FEPASA did not purchase any additional locomotives, only disposing of those no longer needed, including 11 diesel locomotives which had been transferred to CPTM in 1997. At the time of Brazilian railway privatization, the FEPASA had 291 diesels and 117 electrics, totaling 408 locomotives. Upon FEPASA's dissolution, 172 diesel and 114 electric locomotives were transferred to Ferrovia Bandeirantes S/A (FERROBAN, 286 locomotives total), Ferrovia Centro-Atlântica S/A (FCA) received 91 locomotives (only diesels), and Ferrovia Sul-Atlântico S/A (FSA) received 28 diesels and 3 electrics (31 total).

Most of the former FEPASA diesel locomotives continue to operate on Brazilian rail lines by various operators, primarily by Rumo Logística and VLI Multimodal S/A. All of the electric locomotives have been withdrawn, and have either been scrapped, remain derelict in various railroad yards, such as the Paulista Triage Yard, Sorocaba Yard, among others; or are owned by museums or preservation groups. The retired diesels similarly have been either scrapped or remain derelict in yards, such as Lapa Station, Pátio de Araraquara Station, Paulista Classification Yard, and Calsete Station (MG).

Model	Manufacturer	Traction	Origin	FEPASA series	FEPASA number	Gauge	Wheeling	Year of Manufacture	Fleet	Destination	Image
GE 1-C+C-1 Loba	GE Transportation	Electric	EFS	2000	2001–2025	Narrow	1-C+C-1	1943 and 1948	25	3 written off in 1995 21 transferred to FERROBAN and 1 to FSA	
Westinghouse 1-C+C-1 Loba	Westinghouse Electric Corporation	Electric	EFS	2050	2051–2071	Narrow	1-C+C-1	1943 and 1948	21	3 written off in 1995 17 transferred to FERROBAN and 1 to FSA	
GE B-B Mini-Saia	GE Transportation	Electric	EFS	2100	2101-2130	Narrow	B+B	1968 and 1969	30	29 transferred to FERROBAN and 1 to FSA	
Alstom EC-362 Francesa	Alstom	Electric	FEPASA	2200	2201-2202	Narrow	B+B	1984	2	Transferred to FERROBAN	
GE 47T	GE Transportation-Caterpillar Inc.	Diesel–electric powertrain	EFS	3000	3001-3010	Narrow	B+B	1947	10	Written off between 1974 and 1980	
GE U6C	GE Transportation	Diesel–electric powertrain	EFS e CMEF	3100	3101-3145	Narrow	C+C	1947 and 1952	45	37 written off between 1971 and 1991 6 transferred to FERROBAN, 1 to FCA and 1 to FSA	
GE U12B	GE Transportation	Diesel–electric powertrain	EFS	3200	3201-3222	Narrow	B+B	1957 and 1958	22	7 written off between 1985 and 1995 8 transferred to FERROBAN and 7 to FCA	
GE U18C	GE Transportation	Diesel–electric powertrain	EFS	3250	3251-3255	Narrow	C+C	1957	5	Written off between 1974 and 1977	
Whitcomb 94T	Baldwin Locomotive Works	Diesel–electric powertrain	EFS	3300	3301-3315	Narrow	A1A+A1A	1948	15	Written off in 1974	
Baldwin AS-616E	Baldwin Locomotive Works	Diesel–electric powertrain	EFS	3400	3401-3415	Narrow	C+C	1953 and 1954	15	Written off between 1974 and 1977	
ALCO RSD-8	American Locomotive Company	Diesel–electric powertrain	CMEF	3500	3501-3510	Narrow	C+C	1958	10	1 written off in 1978 4 transferred to CPTM and 5 to FERROBAN	
EMD GL8	Electro-Motive Diesel	Diesel–electric powertrain	EFS e CMEF	3600	3601-3638	Narrow	B+B	1960 and 1961	38	11 written off between 1978 and 1995 10 transferred to FERROBAN, 11 to FCA and 6 to FSA	
EMD G12	Electro-Motive Diesel	Diesel–electric powertrain	CMEF	3650	3651-3680	Narrow	B+B	1957	30	7 written off between 1988 and 1995 11 transferred to FERROBAN, 9 to FCA and 3 to FSA	
LEW DE II S	LEW Hennigsdorf	Diesel–electric powertrain	EFS	3700	3701-3730	Narrow	B+B	1967	30	11 written off between 1974 and 1995 4 transferred to CPTM, 9 to FERROBAN, 3 to FCA and 3 to FSA	
LEW DE III M	LEW Hennigsdorf	Diesel–electric powertrain	CMEF	3750	3751-3767	Narrow	B+B	1968	17	8 written off between 1974 and 1995 7 transferred to FERROBAN, 1 to FCA and 1 to FSA	
Krupp DH440	Krupp	Diesel–electric powertrain	EFS	3800 (antiga)	3801-3820	Narrow	B+B	1953	20	Written off between 1971 and 1973	
GE U20C	GE Transportation	Diesel–electric powertrain	FEPASA	3800 (nova)	3801-3910	Narrow	C+C	1974, 1975, 1977 and 1979	110	4 written off between 1991 and 1993 35 transferred to FERROBAN, 57 to FCA and 14 to FSA	
GE 2-C+C-2 Escandalosa	GE Transportation	Electric	RFFSA	6100	6101-6105	Broad	2-C+C-2	1947	5	Transferred to FERROBAN	
Westinghouse 2-C+C-2 Escandalosa	Westinghouse Electric Corporation	Electric	RFFSA	6150	6151-6155	Broad	2-C+C-2	1947	5	2 written off in 1987 3 transferred to FERROBAN	
GE 2-B+B-2 Box	GE Transportation	Electric	CPEF	6300	6301-6304	Broad	2-B+B-2	1921	4	Written off in 1974 and 1976	
Baldwin-Westinghouse 1-B+B-1 Box	Baldwin Locomotive Works-Westinghouse Electric Corporation	Electric	CPEF	6310	6311-6313	Broad	1-B+B-1	1921 and 1925	3	Written off in 1974	
MK 1-C+C-1 Box	Metropolitan-Vickers	Electric	CPEF	6330	6331	Broad	1-C+C-1	1926	1	Written off in 1976	
GE C-C Vanderléia	GE Transportation	Electric	CPEF	6350	6351-6360	Broad	C+C	1967	10	Transferred to FERROBAN	
GE 2-C+C-2 V8	GE Transportation	Electric	CPEF	6370	6371-6392	Broad	2-C+C-2	1939, 1946 and 1947	22	Transferred to FERROBAN	
GE B+B Quadradinha	GE Transportation	Electric	CPEF	6400	6401-6408	Broad	B+B	1921	8	Written off in 1974 and 1978	
Baldwin-Westinghouse C+C Box	Baldwin Locomotive Works-Westinghouse Electric Corporation	Electric	CPEF	6410 (antiga 6320)	6411-6418 (antiga 6321–6330)	Broad	C+C	1921, 1927 and 1928	10	Written off in 1976 and 1995	
GE 1-C+C-1 Box	GE Transportation	Electric	CPEF	6420	6421-6429	Broad	1-C+C-1	1928 and 1930	9	Written off between 1974 and 1983	
GE 2-D+D-2 Russa	GE Transportation	Electric	CPEF	6450	6451-6455	Broad	2-D+D-2	1948	5	Transferred to FERROBAN	
GE B-B Baratinha	GE Transportation	Electric	CPEF	6500	6501-6509	Broad	B+B	1924 and 1926	9	Written off between 1991 and 1995	
GE B-B Baratona	GE Transportation	Electric	CPEF	6510	6511-6518	Broad	B+B	1947	8	Written off between 1987 and 1995	
EMD GP9	Electro-Motive Diesel	Diesel–electric powertrain	EFA	7000	7001-7005	Broad	B+B	1957	5	Transferred to FERROBAN	
EMD GP18	Electro-Motive Diesel	Diesel–electric powertrain	EFA	7000	7006-7017	Broad	B+B	1960	12	Transferred to FERROBAN	
EMD G12	Electro-Motive Diesel	Diesel–electric powertrain	CPEF	7050	7051-7068	Broad	B+B	1958	18	16 transferred to FERROBAN and 2 to FCA	
GE C30-7A	GE Transportation	Diesel–electric powertrain	FEPASA	7200	7201-7207	Broad	C+C	1990	7	Belong to Cutrale Quintela	
ALCO PA-2	American Locomotive Company-GE Transportation	Diesel–electric powertrain	CPEF	7600	7601-7603	Broad	A1A+A1A	1953	3	Written off between 1976 and 1978	
ALCO RSC-3	American Locomotive Company-GE Transportation	Diesel–electric powertrain	CPEF	7650	7651-7662	Broad	A1A+A1A	1951	12	11 written off between 1977 and 1982 1 sold to Holcim in 1981	
GE U9B	GE Transportation	Diesel–electric powertrain	CPEF	7740	7741-7750	Broad	B+B	1959	10	Written off between 1977 and 1980	
LEW DE I PA	LEW Hennigsdorf	Diesel–electric powertrain	CPEF	7760	7761-7796	Broad	B+B	1967	36	11 written off between 1992 and 1995 3 transferred to CPTM and 22 to FERROBAN	
GE U20C	GE Transportation	Diesel–electric powertrain	Fepasa	7800	7801-7826	Broad	C+C	1975, 1976 and 1977	26	Transferred to FERROBAN	

=== Locomotive paint schemes ===
Soon after their formation, the locomotives acquired by FEPASA received the company's first logo, but kept for a while the original painting of the forming railroad, in a period known as the transition phase, until FEPASA had its own locomotive painting scheme, the first of which was based on Paulista's colors.

#	Period	Paint scheme	Observation	Image
1º	1971–1976	Blue with white stripes, uses the first FEPASA logo	Based on the colors of the CPEF, only a part of the locomotives received this painting	
2º	1976–1995	Red with white stripes, uses the second FEPASA logo	The most widely used painting by FEPASA, and therefore the best known	
3º	1995–1998	Gray with black and red stripes, it uses the third FEPASA logo	Few locomotives received the last FEPASA painting	

The locomotives that received the last FEPASA painting were:

- Electric: GE 1-C+C-1 (2019, 2021 and 2025), GE B-B (2113) and GE 2-C+C-2 (6378, 6381 and 6383)
- Diesel: EMD GL8 (3620 and 3635); EMD G12 (3659, 3665, 3672, 7054, 7055, 7059, 7063, 7064 and 7067); EMD GP9 (7001 and 7004); EMD GP18 (7007 and 7009) and GE U20C (3820, 3835, 3839, 3850, 3863, 3873, 3884, 7801, 7802, 7805, 7809, 7817, 7821 and 7824)

=== Passenger cars ===
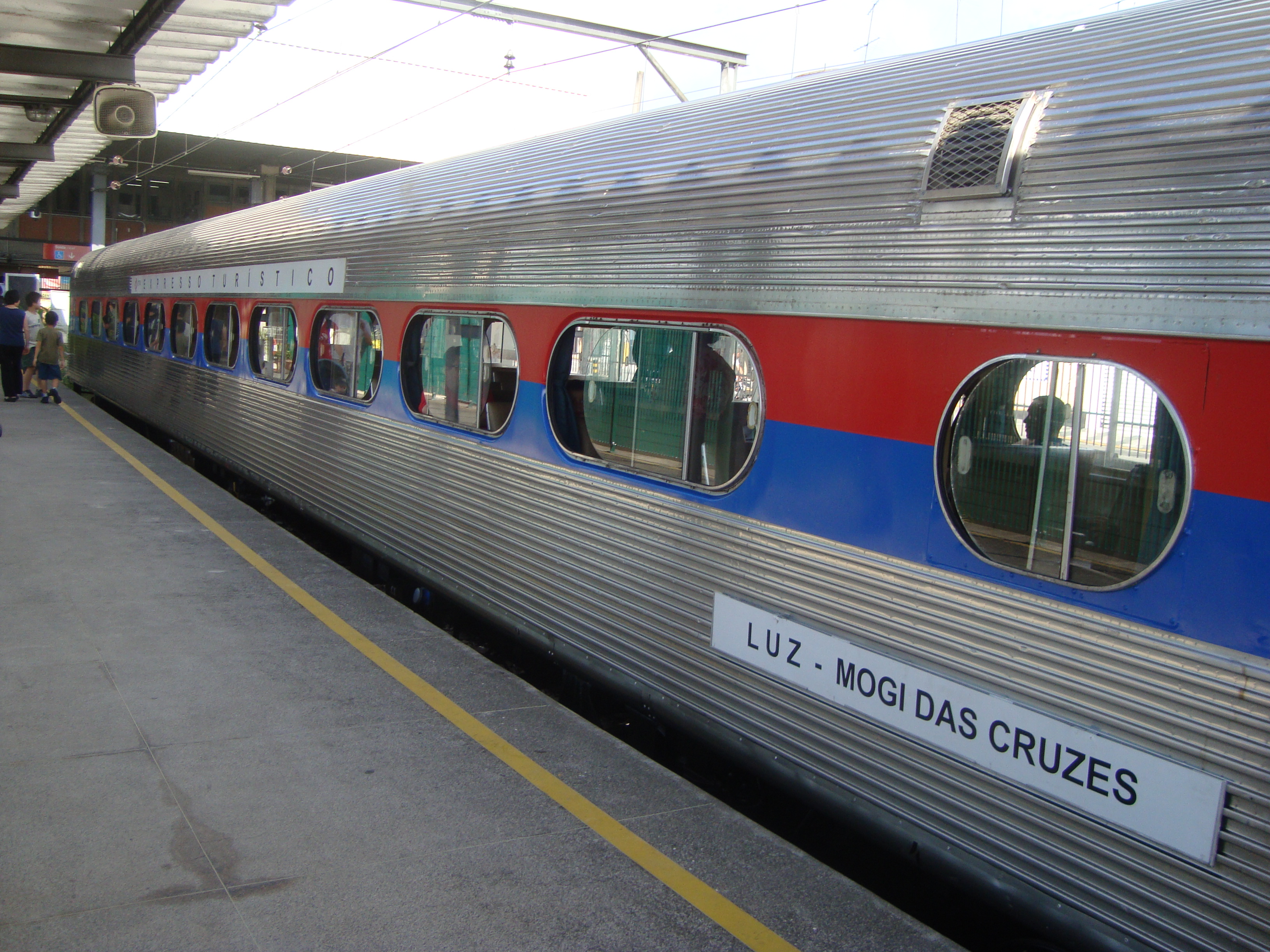
Mafersa 800 former FEPASA car, used in CPTM's Tourist Express.

Fepasa owned 1,191 passenger cars that were received from Sorocabana (492), Paulista (322), Mogiana (243), Araraquara (107) and São Paulo-Minas (27):

- Bandeirante 300 – received from Sorocabana
- Budd 500 – received from Sorocabana
- Mafersa 800 – received from Sorocabana, from Mogiana and from Araraquara
- 100 Series – received from Mogiana
- ACF – received from Paulista
- Pullman Standard – received from Paulista

=== Railway carriages ===
Model	Manufacturers	Traction	Origin	FEPASA series	FEPASA number	Gauge	Wheeling	Year of Manufacture	Fleet	Destination	Image
GE-Pullman	GE Transportation Pullman Company	Electric(592 hp per EMU)	USA	?	?	Metre	R+M+R	1944	4 trains 12 cars	Written off in the 1970s	
Toshiba	Kawasaki Heavy Industries Toshiba Kinki Sharyo Nippon Sharyo	Electric(860 hp per EMU)	Japan	?	?	Metre	R+M+R	1957/1958	30 cars 90 cars	Written off in 1985 Renovated as Series 4800/5900	
4800 Series	FEPASA workshops Rio Claro	Electric(860 hp per EMU)	Brazil	UC 4800 (West/South Line)	4801-4809	Metre	R+M+R	1985–1987	9 trains 27 cars	Written off in 2010 by CPTM Operated in Salvador Suburbs	
5900 Series	FEPASA workshops Rio Claro	Electric(860 hp per EMU)	Brazil	UC 5900(TIM)	59XX-5960	Metre	R+M+R	1987–1989	6 trains 18 cars	Written off in 1999 by CPTM	
9000/5000 Series	FrancorailMTE Brown Boveri Traction Cem Oerlikon Jeumont Schneider COBRASMA	Electric(1437 hp per EMU)	France/Brazil	UI9000 (pre SIGO) UI5000 (SIGO)	5001-5100	Broad	M+R1+R2	1978/1980	100 trains 300 cars	Written off in 2012 by CPTM Renovated and still operated by CPTM as 5400 Series	
9500/5500 Series	MafersaVillares ACEC Sorefame Budd Company	Electric(1651 hp per EMU)	Brazil Portugal	UI9500 (pre SIGO) UI5500 (SIGO)	UI 5501- UI 5550	Broad	M+R1+R2	1978/1980	50 trains 150 cars	Written off 2012 by CPTM Some renovated by CPTM as 5550 Series and written off in 2014	
5700 Series	La Brugeoise et NivellesCOBRASMA	Electric(536 hp per EMU)	Brazil Belgium	UC 5700 (SIGO)	UC 5701-UC 5706	Broad	M1+M2	1978/1980 1990	3 trains 6 cars	Used on Campinas' LRT and Written off in 1995 by FEPASA Destroyed by an arson in Rio Claro in 2018	

=== Freight wagons ===
In 1971, FEPASA had about 17,200 wagons that were received from Sorocabana (9,176), Paulista (4,490), Mogiana (2,803), Araraquara (625) and São Paulo-Minas (182), of which about 60% were deficient. Due to this situation, FEPASA began to order new wagons from domestic factories, such as COBRASMA, in order to meet the needs of the railroad and prepare it to meet the growing demand for export cargoes. Companies were also hired to recover and better use a good part of the deficient wagons.

But many were already unserviceable and became scrap, and therefore the quantity was reduced over time, so much so that in 1977 there were 16,329 wagons and in 1983 the number was 14,430 wagons.

In the 1990s, there was a reversal in the railroad's freight transport, with priority given to soybeans and liquids, characterized by the expansion of the hopper and tank car fleet. FEPASA entered into a partnership with the Cutrale-Quintela (CQ) holding company in 1991, worth US$30 million to transport soybeans and oranges (citrus meal). CQ acquired 7 Dash-7/C30-7 locomotives (out of 40 promised) while FEPASA would supply 800 wagons. The bankruptcy of BANESPA, the change of management from Quércia to Fleury, and problems with FEPASA caused the partnership to be altered until it was extinguished in 1996. Sometime later, CQ went bankrupt.

Comparative chart by type of wagon (1977–1996)
Types of wagon	1977	1983	1996	Image
Covered	9,785	7,510	5,823	
Tank	930	1,345	2,905	
Gondola	2,204	2,005	1,889	
Flat	1,373	1,220	1,196	
Hopper	318	852	1,007	
Cages	612	93	0	
Others	1,107	1,405	1,001	
Total	16,329	14,430	13,821	

Types of freight cars used by FEPASA:

- FR FR – Conventional covered
- FH – Covered hopper type with hatches and hoppers (for the transport of soybeans, corn and other bulk products)
- FL – Covered with sliding sides (for the transport of bagged cement)
- FE – Covered with hatches
- FB – Covered with hatches and hinged doors (intended for the transport of bulk sugar)
- IC / IF – Isothermal covered
- GN – Gondola (for the transportation of railroad ballast)
- GH – Gondola type "hopper" with tilting edges (for the transport of coal, clinker, cement slag, stone powder and other materials)
- GF – Gondola with fixed edges and mobile bottom
- GT – Gondola with falling edges
- TC – Conventional tank (for the transportation of hydrated alcohol and petroleum products)
- TS – Tank with heating coils (for the transport of hydrated alcohol and petroleum products)
- TP – Tank for pulverized products (for the transportation of bulk cement)
- PE / PM – Conventional platform
- PD – Conventional platform with device for containers
- PP – Platform with headboard
- PR – Platform with a lowered platform bed (for the transport of heavy and large loads)
- HF – Conventional Closed Hopper (for bulk products like soybean, corn or even sulfur)
- HT – Conventional Hopper Tank
- AC – Cage with cover, dunnage and metallic structure

== Services provided ==
=== Suburbs and urban trains ===
- FEPASA West Line – remains active as the current Line 8 of São Paulo Metropolitan Trains.
- FEPASA 's South Line – remains active as the present Line 9 São Paulo Metropolitan Trains.
- Intra Metropolitan Trains – was created by FEPASA on July 12, 1990, to transport passengers from Samaritá Station in São Vicente to Ana Costa Station in Santos. Its tracks gave way to the present Baixada Santista LRT.
- Campinas LRT.
- Bauru's Urban Train.

=== Long distance passenger trains ===
Number of passengers - long haul (in millions)

Sources: FEPASA

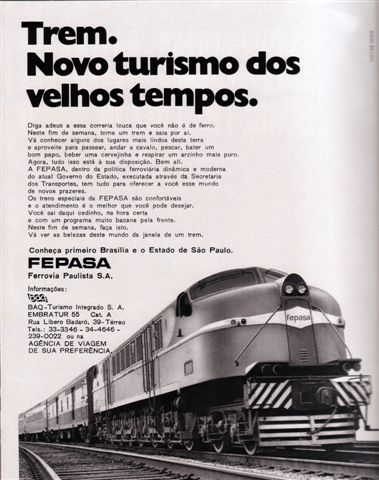
FEPASA's advertisement about long-distance passenger trains, 1973.

When FEPASA was formed, services were maintained according to the pattern established by the now-defunct CPEF, with 60 trains a day in both directions and throughout the broad-gauge network. However, the degradation of the service and the age of the material used were already showing signs that passenger transport would enter an ultimate phase, as a survey carried out between 1970 and 1974 pointed out a decrease in passenger movement, comparing it with transport by road bus, where the train carried 10.6% of the total that buses had carried in 1970, and shows that already in 1974 it carried only 4.2% of the bus.

In this period few measures were taken, where traffic in the busiest areas was maintained, but with the suppression of service in the extensions and in some lines of the trunk line as well, such as the one from Barretos to Colombia.

So new train formats were applied, such as the regular PM, PS, and PP trains (Passenger Mogiana, Passenger Sorocabana, and Passenger Paulista). Among the stations that were in operation, only the busiest ones remained open. Services like the Pullman class cars were extinct, wooden cars were switched to "unpaid" service, and a first reform of the fleet was carried out. In 1983 the second painting pattern used by FEPASA on passenger cars appeared (blue with two white stripes), a little different from the first painting that was entirely blue as in the CPEF.

It was only during the Quércia administration, in 1988, that a new reformulation of the trains began, with the creation of the "Trem Diferenciado" (Differentiated Train). It was the way found to renew the image of passenger service, proposing improvements in the operation and rolling stock with moderate investment. At this time, the third painting pattern for the carbon steel cars (gray with three stripes: red, white, and black) was created. The project was inaugurated in September 1988 with 12 reformed carbon steel cars, where each composition was formed by six cars, one which ran the São Paulo-Barretos line and another which ran the São Paulo-Marília line. This train was considered "parador" (stopper) as it served all the stations open on the lines, with just over 30 on each line.

Also in September 1988 the "Trem Expresso" (Express Train) was introduced, which served the São Paulo-Araraquara section, and for this another 12 cars were selected and reformed, this time using only stainless steel cars, receiving also the new external paint pattern of the carbon steel cars and each composition was formed by six cars, the same way as the "Trem Diferenciado".

These services lasted until the mid-1990s but with several changes, such as the implantation of new cars to the compositions, schedule changes, and even the mixture between stainless and carbon steel cars with different types of painting, breaking the standardization of the compositions.

Destinations of the FEPASA passenger trains (1997)

In 1995, during the Covas government, the new administration set some investment goals, which also included the reform and modernization of passenger trains. The proposal was based on the increase in revenue with a reduction in costs and the renovation of all the equipment and stations, with two fronts to be attacked: the traveler and the tourist – for the latter, TremTur was created, a division of FEPASA in partnership with EMBRATUR, which was given the mission of fomenting railway tourism in the state of São Paulo.

To offer these new services, FEPASA refurbished the stainless steel cars and also some carbon steel cars. At this time, the latest standard of painting for passenger cars appears (three thin continuous stripes – red, white and black – on the skirt of the car, and on the pediment over the windows carried, next to the new FEPASA logo, the name of the company in full, and to identify which train they belonged to, each of the compositions carried its name on a plate or sticker on the side of the car).

The new passenger trains were as follows:

- Bandeirante Trains: to compete with road transport, they were equivalent to the old regular trains.
- Express Trains: were the new models of the fast trains created in the second half of the 1980s, now with even luxurious refinements to attract tourists.
- Special Train: created to serve the needy population.

Train	Line	Observations
Turistico	Campinas ↔ Peruíbe	
Bandeirante Presidente Prudente	São Paulo (Barra Funda) ↔ Presidente Prudente	suppressed November 1998
Bandeirante	Presidente Prudente ↔ Presidente Epitácio	suppressed in January 1999
Bandeirante	São Paulo (Barra Funda) ↔ Panorama	suppressed in March 2001
Bandeirante	Itirapina ↔ São José do Rio Preto	suppressed in March 2001
Bandeirante	Araraquara ↔ Barretos	suppressed in January 1999
Bandeirante Apiaí	Sorocaba ↔ Apiaí	suppressed in March 2001
Bandeirante	Santos ↔ Embu-Guaçu	suppressed in November 1997
Bandeirante Litorâneo	Santos ↔ Juquiá	suppressed in November 1997
Expresso Azul	São Paulo (Barra Funda) ↔ São José do Rio Preto	suppressed in January 1999
Expresso Ouro Verde	São Paulo (Barra Funda) ↔ Presidente Prudente	suppressed in November 1998
Expresso Estrela d'Oeste	São Paulo (Barra Funda) ↔ Panorama	suppressed in January 1999
Expresso Ouro Branco	Campinas ↔ Araguari	suppressed in September 1997

All passenger trains still in operation were "suspended" by the new FERROBAN concessionaire on January 18, 1999, under the allegation that the service was precarious and offered risk to users. But as the concession notice for the São Paulo network required the maintenance of passenger services for another year, some lines were resumed on August 1, 1999, and the last trains had their operation stopped on March 15, 2001, when, 130 years after the first passenger train in the state of São Paulo circulated, its last attempts to continue were eradicated.

Year	Passengers (in millions)
1971	16,693
1972	15,226
1973	13,770
1974	12,913
1975	13,683
1976	12,540
1977	9,217
1978	8,215
1979	5,602
1980	5,159
1981	5,883
1982	5,240
1983	4,617
1984	4,936
1985	5,910
1986	6,860
1987	6,470
1988	7,500
1989	7,700
1990	8,300
1992	5,800
1996	1,112
1997	673
1998	666

=== Freight transportation ===
General cargo in millions TKU

Sources: FEPASA

EPASA was inserted in the Brazilian railway network as an important agent for the flow of production from the new agricultural frontiers of the Central-West to the highly industrialized region around São Paulo. It was also connected to the north–south rail link in Brazil, essential for the circulation and distribution of goods nationwide. In addition, its access to the country's most important port made it possible for Brazilian products with high added value to be present in the international market.

Freight transportation was FEPASA's most important traffic and source of revenue. The main products transported were cement, cement clinker, iron, steel, fertilizers, paper, cellulose, bauxite, sulfur, ammonium, dolomite, limestone, hydrated lime, phosphates, fuels (alcohol and petroleum derivatives), coffee, sugar, cotton, meat, beans, rice, corn, wheat, soybeans, peanuts, wheat flour, bran in general, vegetable oils, oranges (citrus juices and pellets) and cattle The amount transported of each of these products has varied greatly over the years.

The company's cargo operation extended to the São Paulo coast, down the mountain range to Santos, then heading to Cajati, and on the other side to the extremes of the state of São Paulo, on the borders with Mato Grosso do Sul and Paraná, penetrating Minas Gerais and converging at various points with river navigation and RFFSA.

On the border with Mato Grosso do Sul, along the Paraná River, the rails reached as far as Santa Fé do Sul, Panorama and Presidente Epitácio, with direct loading and unloading operations at the local port.

The railroad's points of contact with the RFFSA, on the border with Paraná, were through the lines in Itararé and Ourinhos, as well as Pinhalzinho on the branch line built by FEPASA to serve the Southern Mainline. From Apiaí, passing through the regions of Itapeva and Sorocaba there was the transportation of industrial limestone and dolomite to the COSIPA facilities. Cement clinker transportation also followed a single flow from Sorocaba to São Paulo, serving the Votorantim Industries.

Minas Gerais was the state with which the São Paulo railroad network was most integrated. From Poços de Caldas, shipments of bauxite went directly to the CBA plant in the Sorocaba region.

The Ribeirão Preto-Araguari stretch, where FEPASA's penetration into Minas Gerais was most accentuated, was part of the railroad connection between the south of the country and the Federal District. For this reason, its entire route was remodeled and the Araguari-Santos Export Corridor, responsible for 60% of all cargo transported by the railroad, drained the crops of the Triângulo Mineiro and Goiás to the Port of Santos. This line, after the rectifications, started to have characteristics that made it possible to better serve a rich agricultural region, one of the largest sugar, alcohol and grain producing centers, absorbing almost all the phosphate rock production of the installed complexes. The stretch is also an indispensable element for the outflow of the most diverse products, both to the Triângulo Mineiro and Goiás, as well as to the Port of Santos and the Port of Paranaguá, axes of intense traffic of railway compositions that transport fertilizers, wheat, cement (in bags and in bulk), limestone for farming, hydrated lime, bran, sulfur and ammonia.

In addition to these connections, FEPASA relied on RFFSA in Jundiaí, which allowed trains traveling on its broad-gauge system access to São Paulo, Rio de Janeiro, the Port of Santos, and Bauru, where direct metric gauge traffic was made possible to Santa Cruz de la Sierra on the Bolivian corridor.

== Extinction and concession of the Paulista Network ==
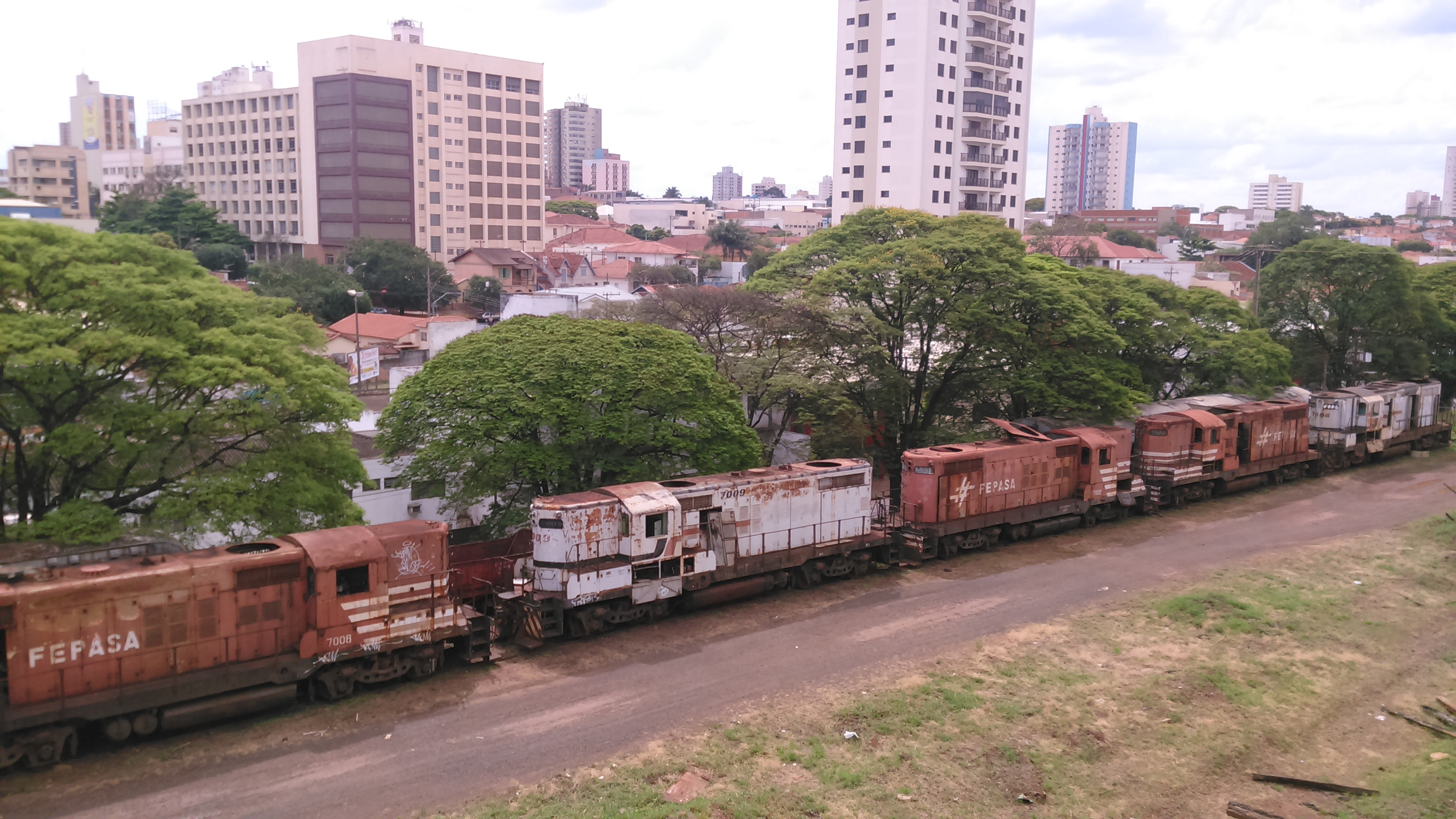
Abandoned locomotives from the extinct FEPASA in the Araraquara yard.

On March 29, 1996, the CPTM absorbed the FEPASA DRM train systems, and started to effectively operate the current Line 8-Diamante and Line 9-Esmeralda, which were part of the railway network used for suburban transport in the western and southern regions of Greater São Paulo, and also the Intra Metropolitan Train (TIM) which served Baixada Santista. This split occurred so that the privatization of the FEPASA network could begin and the metropolitan passenger transport services would remain under state control.

On December 23, 1997, FEPASA was transferred to the Union as payment for debts of the São Paulo government and BANESPA by the then governor Mário Covas. On February 18, 1998, by Decree No. 2,502 of the Presidency of the Republic, FEPASA was authorized to be incorporated to RFFSA. The transfer was approved after the authorization given by the Extraordinary General Assembly on May 29, 1998. With this, the line corresponding to the railway network of the former FEPASA was then called Paulista Network of RFFSA.

In the auction for the concession of the Paulista Network by RFFSA, held on November 10, 1998, on B3 Stock Exchange, the winner was the consortium Ferroban for a period of 30 years, renewable for the same period beginning on January 1, 1999, when it took control of the São Paulo line.

In the concession process, FEPASA's original metre-gauge network suffered two splits: the section from Campinas to Uberlândia (MG), originating from CMEF, became under the control of FCA, and the lines from Iperó to Apiaí and from Rubião Junior to Presidente Epitácio, originating from EFS, became under the control of FSA.

In 2002, FERROBAN's control was taken over by the holding company Brasil Ferrovias (BF), which in 2004 transferred the metre-gauge line between Mairinque and Bauru to Ferrovia Novoeste. In 2006, BF was absorbed by América Latina Logística (ALL), in view of the share merger operation.

Since April 2015, the Paulista Network has been managed by Rumo Logística, which merged with ALL. In November 2015, Rumo filed a formal request with the National Land Transport Agency (ANTT) for the early renewal of the Paulista Network concession for another 30 years. The renewal contract was signed on May 27, 2020, extending the concession term until 2058.

In the concession renewal process, the line from Santos to Cajati, with 232 km in metre-gauge, and the Piracicaba Branch Line, with 42 kilometers in broad-gauge, were returned inoperative to the Federal Government.

== Logo ==
Throughout its history FEPASA had three logos. The first was provisional, with the name FEPASA written in italics and in lower-case letters, and lasted from November 1971 to December 1976. The second was chosen after a contest:

Position	Office	Responsible
1º	Programação Visual e Desenho Industrial Ltda.	Joaquim de Salles Redig de Campos
2º	Douglas Piccolo Arquitetura e Planejamento Visual Ltda.	Carlos Ferro, Douglas Piccolo, Roberto Rondino e Sylvio Ulhoa Cintra

The chosen logo was elaborated by PUC-Rio Arts & Design Department professor Joaquim de Salles Redig de Campos. This logo, composed of straight lines crossed at an angle, was officially used until May 1995.

The third logo was developed by architect and designer João Carlos Mosterio Carvalho and adopted between May 1995 and the company's extinction in 1998.

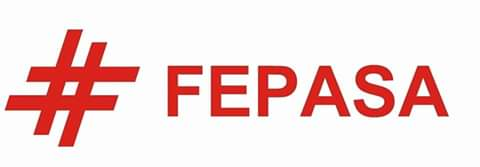
FEPASA's best-known logo (1976–1995).

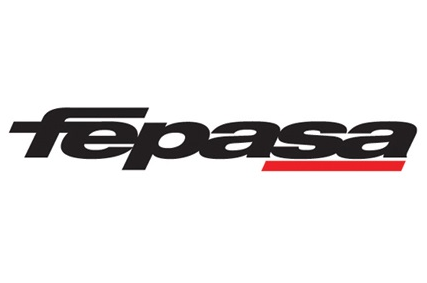
FEPASA's last logo (1995–1998).

== See also ==
- RFFSA – Federal Railway Network S/A
- Fepasa complex
- CPEF – Paulista Railroads Company
- Rumo Logística
- Rail transport in Brazil
- History of rail transport in Brazil
