= GE 2-C+C-2 =

Electric locomotive by General Electric

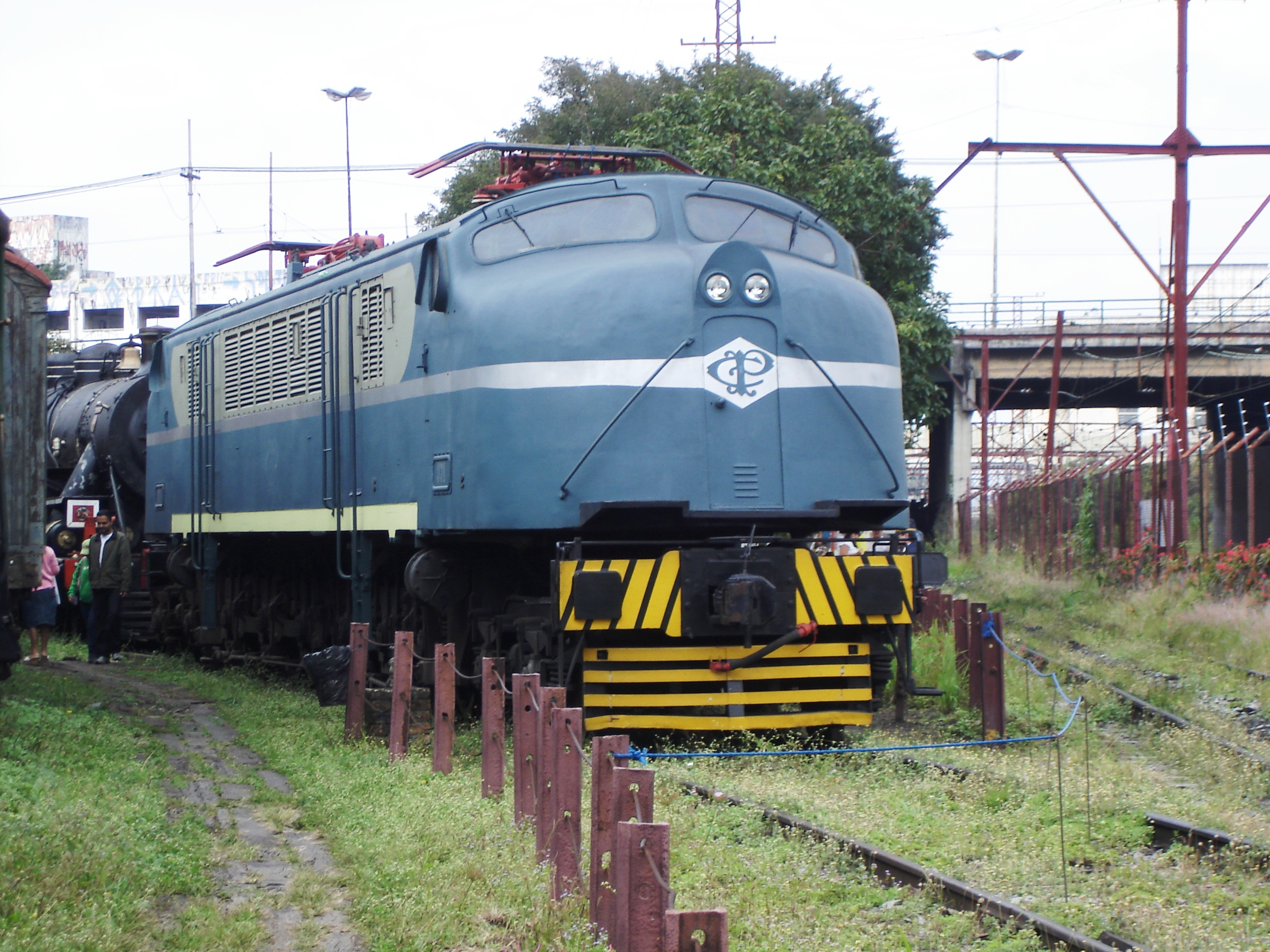
- Locomotive #371
Type and origin
- Power type: Electric
- Builder: General Electric, Westinghouse
- Model: GE 2-C+C-2
- Build date: 1940; 1946-1948
- Total produced: 37 (Brazil); 22 for Companhia Paulista and 15 for Estrada de Ferro Central do Brasil
Specifications
- Configuration
  - AAR: 2-C+C-2
- Gauge: 1,600 mm (5 ft 3 in)
- Bogies: Arch-bar
- Wheel diameter: 1,168 mm (46.0 in)
- Trailing dia.: 914 mm (36.0 in)
- Minimum curve: 87 m (285.43 ft)
- Length: 23.101 m (75.79 ft)
- Width: 3.010 m (9.88 ft)
- Height: 4.343 m (14.25 ft)
- Loco weight: 165.1 t (162.5 long tons; 182.0 short tons)
- Fuel type: Electric
- Electric system/s: 3,000 V
- Current pickup: Pantographs from catenary
- Traction motors: Multiple, later removed by FEPASA
- Train brakes: Air and electric
Performance figures
- Maximum speed: 145 km/h (90 mph)
- Power output: 3,870 hp (2,890 kW)
Career
- Locale: São Paulo and Rio de Janeiro: Companhia Paulista de Estradas de Ferro, FEPASA, Estrada de Ferro Central do Brasil, RFFSA
- Delivered: 1940, and 1946 to 1948
- First run: 1940
- Last run: RFFSA: 1982; Fepasa: 1998
- Retired: 1998
- Preserved: 10
- Restored: 2000
- Scrapped: 2003 to 2004
- Current owner: DNIT and city of Bauru
- The nicknames known as G.E. Little Joes

The GE 2-C+C-2 was an electric locomotive built by General Electric employed in the Companhia Paulista de Estradas de Ferro and later in the Estrada de Ferro Central do Brasil, based on the EP-4 model built for the New York, New Haven, and Hartford Railroad. It had 3817 hp of power and total weight of 165 tons, being classified in the AAR standard as 2-C+C-2. They were employed between 1940 and 1998 when the last ones were deactivated by obsolescence by Fepasa in São Paulo.

== History ==
=== Design and construction (Companhia Paulista) ===
In 1927, the São Paulo state government authorized the state's railroad concessionaires to charge a 10% fee on their freight customers so that each concessionaire could set up an investment fund for maintenance and the acquisition of rolling stock. Despite the Great Depression, Companhia Paulista felt few of its effects because it used electric traction in much of its network. As freight and passenger traffic grew throughout the 1930s, Companhia Paulista decided to order new locomotives from General Electric using part of its maintenance and acquisition fund.

Evolution of the Companhia Paulista de Estradas de Ferro (1930-1939)
Year	Transported cargo (in tonnes)	Passengers transported	Locomotives
1930	2,051,327	3,468,897	223 45 electric 178 steam
1934	2,596,606	2,051,327	219 45 electric 174 steam
1939	3.825,604	6.135,831	224 45 electric 179 steam
Sources: Annual Reports of Companhia Paulisra for 1930, 1935, and 1939.

Twenty-two electric locomotives of type 2-C+C-2, with 3.817 horsepower and 165 tons were ordered based on the model EP-4 locomotives delivered by General Electric to the New York, New Haven and Hartford Railroad. The first locomotive was shipped from the United States to Brazil at the end of 1939, and arrived disassembled in the port of Santos on January 20, 1940.

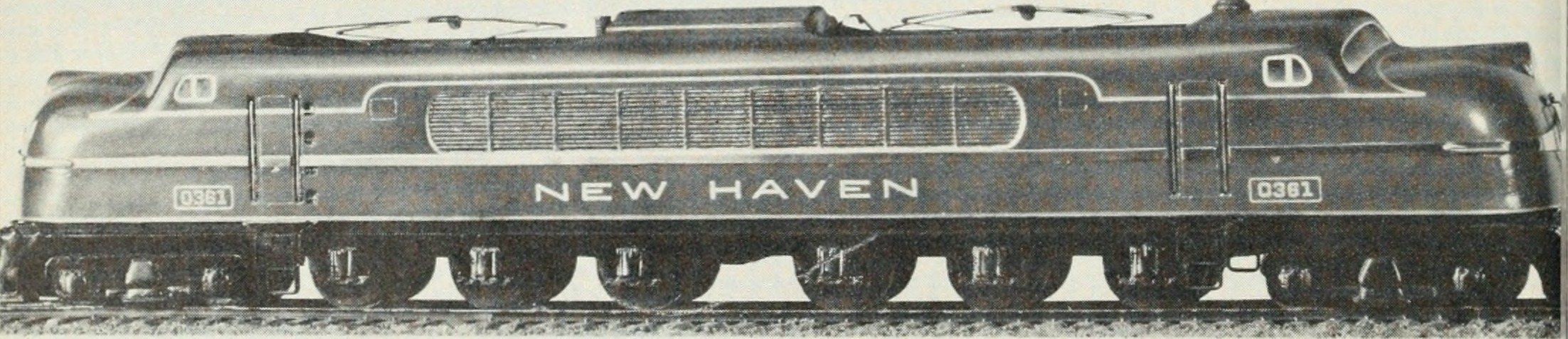
GE EP-4 locomotive from the New York, New Haven and Hartford Railroad.

By the end of 1940, another three locomotives were delivered. With the increasing involvement of the United States in World War II, General Electric supported the war effort and eventually halted the supply of the remaining 18 locomotives. It was resumed only in 1947 and completed in 1948:

Locomotives delivery
Year	Quantity
1940	4
1947	10
1948	8
Total	22

=== Design and construction (Central do Brasil) ===
The electrification project for the Central do Brasil Railroad began in 1935 and had its first stage inaugurated on July 10, 1937. Unlike Companhia Paulista, which hired General Electric, Central hired the British company Metropolitan-Vickers to supply various equipment, including 30 electric locomotives. The Second World War, however, affected the project more intensely than Paulista, and Metropolitan-Vickers was forced by the British government to abandon the project. Central tried to build 6 locomotives, with relative success, but still needed another 24. After the end of the war, Central decided to contract the Electrical Export Corporation-Cobrazil consortium (which successfully electrified the Sorocabana Trunk Line) to supply 15 electric locomotives. Although it intended for 1-C+C-1 or C-C type locomotives, Central was obliged by the War Production Board (WPB) of the U.S. government to acquire GE 2-C+C-2 locomotives similar to those supplied to Companhia Paulista. The locomotives were delivered in 1947.

Locomotives delivery
Year	Quantity
1947	15
Total	15

=== Operation (EFCB-RFFSA) ===
==== Rio de Janeiro (1947–1980) ====
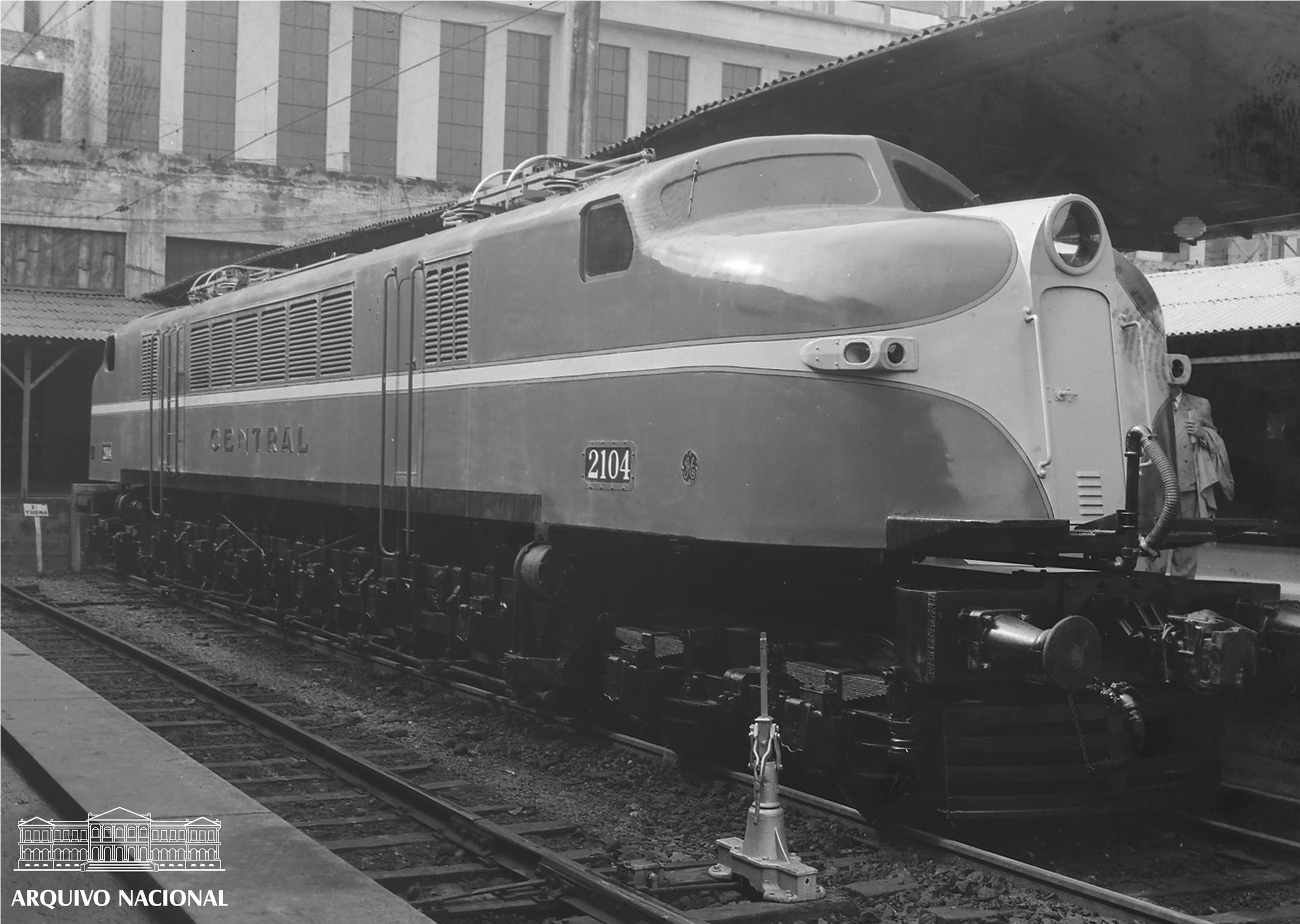
First locomotive delivered to Central do Brasil, 1947. Source: National Archives

Central's first locomotive was delivered on July 16, 1947. Initially, they were used in passenger and cargo services between Rio de Janeiro and Volta Redonda. Their performance with freight trains, however, was below expectations due to their low adhesion and the steeper grade of the track. This caused them to "skid" and damage rails and wheelsets. The low performance caused diesel locomotives to be used to transport cargo while the 2-C+C-2 locomotives started to pull passenger trains. In 1957, the locomotives were incorporated into the Federal Railway Network (RFFSA), changing their colors. RFFSA expanded the functions of the locomotives, using them to pull suburban trains in the late 1970s. With the progressive deactivation of electrification between Volta Redonda and Japeri between 1970 and 1984, the 2-C+C-2 locomotives performed fewer and fewer services until they were transferred from Rio de Janeiro to the Santos-Jundiaí Railroad in São Paulo in 1980.

==== São Paulo (1980–1982) ====
In São Paulo RFFSA barely operated its 2-C+C-2 locomotives on the Santos-Jundiaí Railroad. Between 1981 and 1982 it transferred 10 of the locomotives to Fepasa while it received 11 ALCO RSC-3 diesel locomotives from the São Paulo state-owned company. The five remaining locomotives were scrapped by RFFSA in the 1980s.

=== Operation (Companhia Paulista/Fepasa) ===
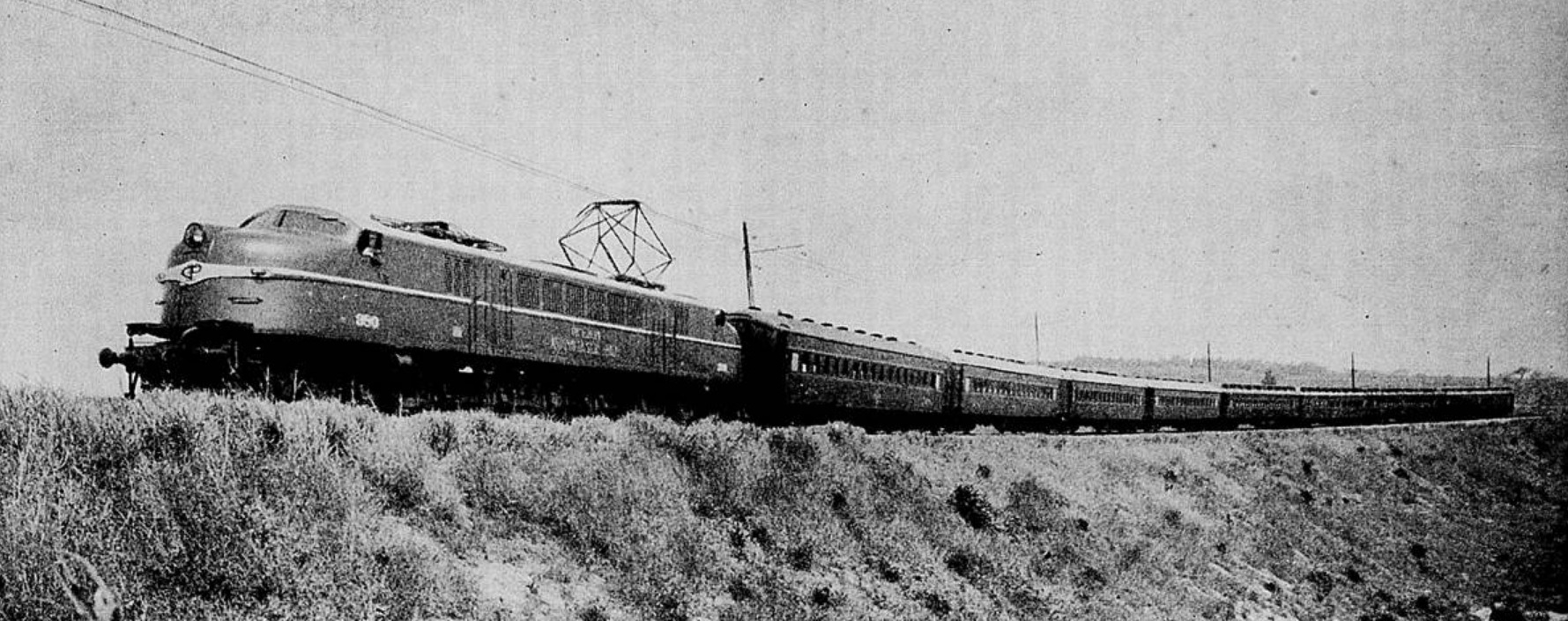
Companhia Paulista's 2-C+C-2 locomotive pulling a passenger train in 1941.

The first locomotives were delivered in 1940 and started to pull passenger and freight trains for Companhia Paulista. After the completion of several road readjustment works on Paulista lines, the locomotives began to reach speeds of 120 kilometers per hour. Initially supplied with a pin+hook coupler, the locomotives had their equipment replaced in the 1950s by Janney couplers.

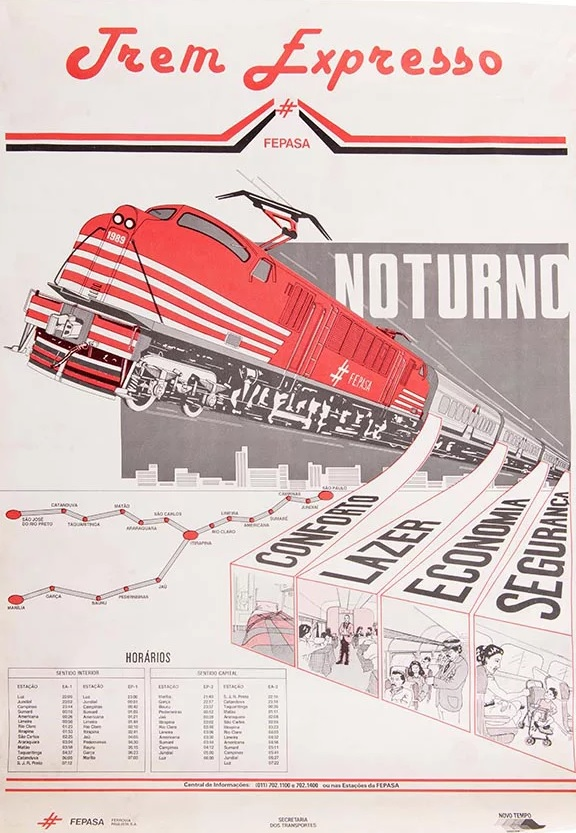
Fepasa advertisement about the new services, highlighting the 2-C+C-2 locomotive.

The good technical performance of the locomotives led Companhia Paulista to expand passenger and freight transport, hitting production records in the 1950s. After Paulista was nationalized in 1961, the government of Sâo Paulo invested in new General Electric locomotives, received in 1968. As a result, 2-C+C-2 locomotives began to play an increasingly secondary role in freight transportation. In 1971, Paulista was unified by the state government with the other railroads in the state, and Ferrovia Paulista S/A (Fepasa) was formed. Fepasa made plans to start replacing 2-C+C-2 locomotives in 1973, but the First Oil Crisis delayed these plans. In 1976, Fepasa signed a contract with Francorail to replace the 2-C+C-2 with 10 C-C locomotives manufactured by Alstom.

With a lack of resources, Fepasa's replacement plan was postponed and in 1981 the state company acquired 10 2-C+C-2 locomotives from the Federal Railroad Network to reform and supply parts for the existing fleet of 22 2-C+C-2 locomotives inherited from Companhia Paulista. Between 1982 and 1988 Fepasa retired eight of the locomotives acquired from the RFFSA and scrapped them. With this, the fleet underwent its first major overhaul and encouraged Fepasa to invest in the renovation of its passenger trains, creating new services. In 1989, the 2-C+C-2 locomotive #6386 prepared by Fepasa and the Technological Research Institute broke the Brazilian record for rail speed when reaching 164 kilometers per hour on a route between Itirapina and Santa Gertrudes. Despite the investments in the renovation of the locomotives, Fepasa was highly indebted and terminated the contract for the acquisition of Alstom locomotives in 1992.

In 1995, Fepasa was highly indebted and began to substitute the electric fleet for diesel-electric machines. In the following year, a study indicated the need for investments of almost 50 million dollars to substitute the entire existing electrical network, and this investment had no forecast of being amortized. With no resources, Fepasa began a slow process of deactivating all its electric locomotives, including the 2-C+C-2, completed in 1998.

=== Preservation ===
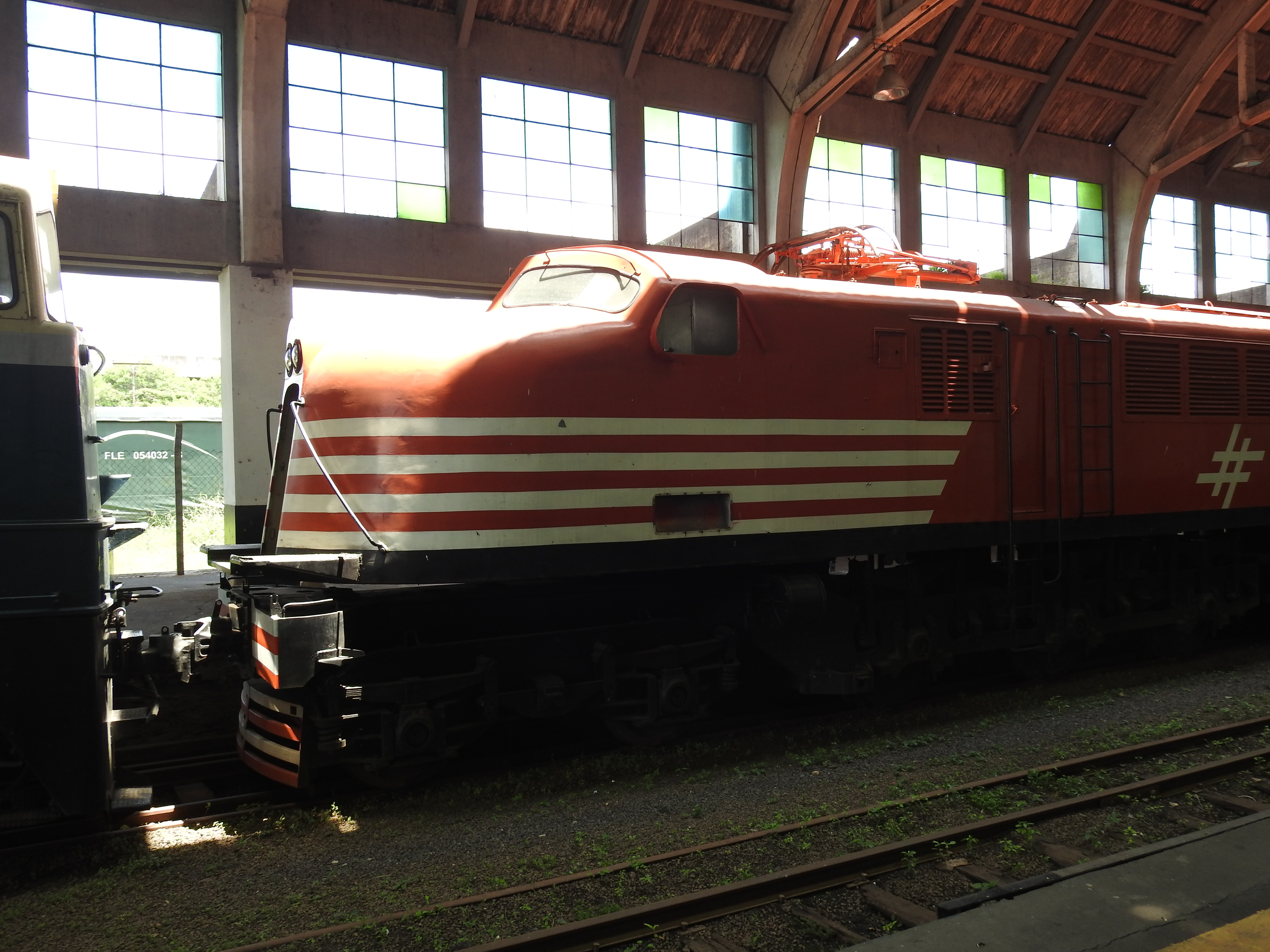
Locomotive #6387, refurbished and parked at Bauru Station (NOB).

After the deactivation of the locomotives in 1998, Fepasa was incorporated to RFFSA and its network was conceded as part of the national program of privatization and extinction of RFFSA. The electric locomotives became State property (represented by the National Department of Transportation Infrastructure). Nowadays there are a few preserved locomotives, but only two are refurbished (in São Paulo and Bauru):

Preserved locomotives
Number	Location
371 (6392)	São Paulo, maintained by the Brazilian Association for Railway Preservation
381 (6381)	Cruzeiro, São Paulo, maintained by the Brazilian Association for Railway Preservation
378 (6378)	Rio Claro, Railway Memory Institute
383 (6383)	Rio Claro, Railway Memory Institute
387 (6387)	Bauru, Bauru Regional Railway Museum
374 (6374)	Jundiaí, Companhia Paulista Museum
375 (6375)	Jundiaí, Companhia Paulista Museum
379 (6379)	Jundiaí, Companhia Paulista Museum
389 (6389)	Jundiaí, Companhia Paulista Museum
377 (6377)	Araraquara

== Accidents ==
- January 19, 1953 - Rio de Janeiro (RJ). Locomotive 2115 derailed near the Engenho de Dentro station. No victims.
- March 29, 1991 - Rio Claro (SP). A Fepasa 2-C+C-2 locomotive derailed after a landslide occurred on the railroad outside Rio Claro. The driver suffered minor injuries while his assistant had a fractured leg.

== In popular culture ==
- A composition formed by a 2-C+C-2 locomotive and Fepasa Standard Pullman cars was used in the artistic project "Kino trem" (1996-1997), by the artists Lucas Bambozzi, Eliane Caffé, and Ricardo Ribenboim.
- Fepasa's locomotive #6381 was used in the movie Dois Córregos (1999), by Carlos Reichenbach.
- The 2-C+C-2 locomotive started to be reproduced on HO Scale in 2004 by Frateschi Trens Elétricos.
- Locomotive #371 was used in scenes of the soap operas O Profeta (2006) and Ciranda de Pedra (2008) of Rede Globo.
