= Votorantim Cimentos =

Brazilian cement company

- Company type: Private
- Industry: Cement
- Founded: 1933 in Votorantim, São Paulo
- Headquarters: São Paulo, Brazil
- Key people: Marcelo Castelli, (CEO)
- Products: Cement, concrete, aggregates
- Revenue: ▲US$ 3.5 billion (2017)
- Net income: ▲US$ 545.0 million (2017)
- Number of employees: 12,950
- Parent: Votorantim Group
- Website: www.votorantimcimentos.com.br

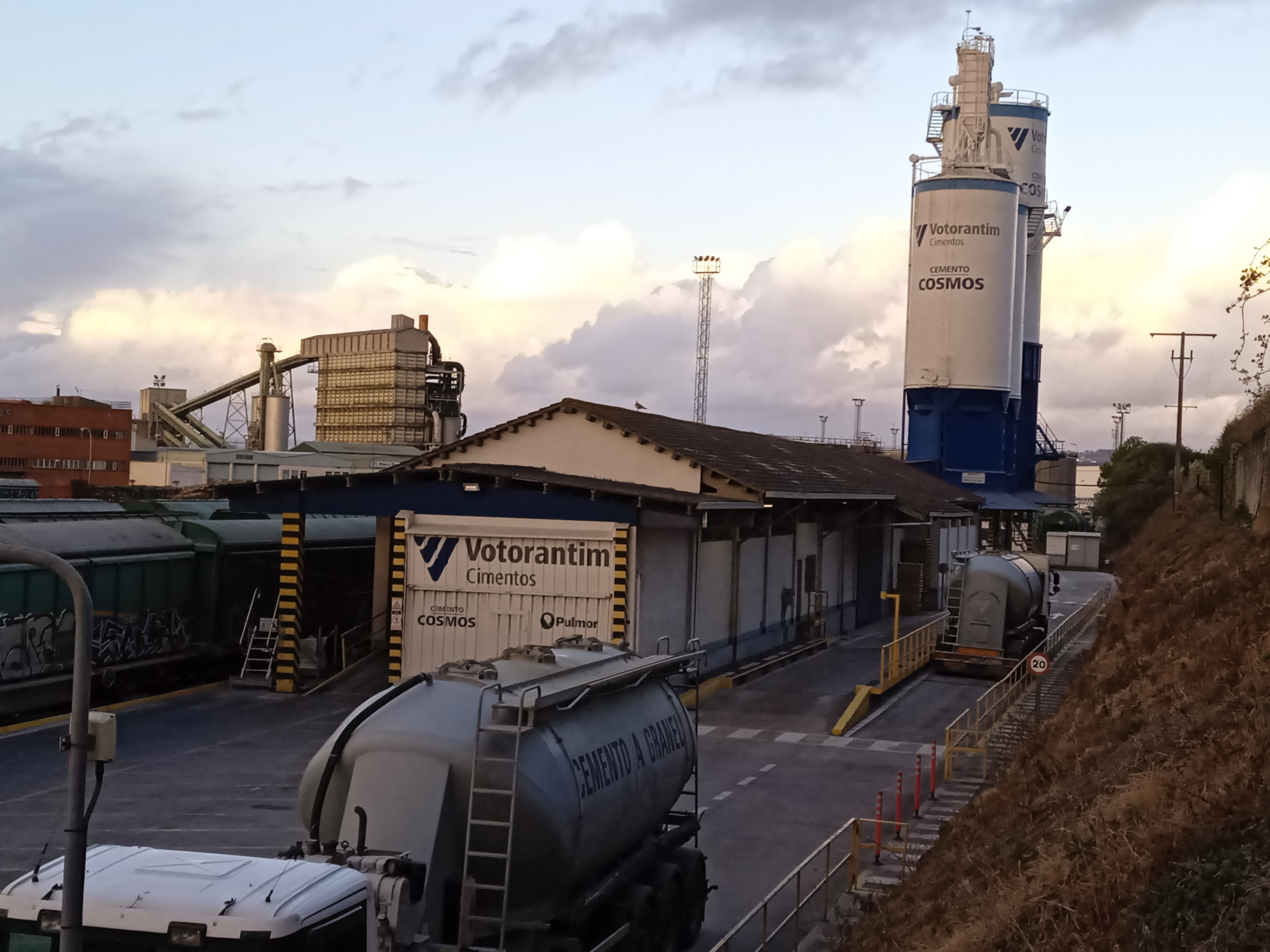
Cimentos_Votorantim. A Coruña - San Diego train station.

Votorantim Cimentos is the largest cement company of Brazil and the eighth largest in the world. The company was founded in the city of Votorantim in 1933 and is headquartered in São Paulo. In February 2010, the Votorantim Cimentos acquired 21.2% of the Portuguese cement company Cimpor. In 2012 the company sold this stake and acquired cement-related assets in Asia, Africa and South America.

The company operates plants in Brazil, Argentina, Bolivia, Canada, Chile, Spain, United States, Uruguay, Paraguay, Peru, Tunisia, Morocco and Turkey. It owns 50 production units of cement, mortar, lime, limestone and aggregate and 90 concrete centers in Brazil, and 6 production units of cement, 198 production units of aggregates and concrete centers in North America with a total capacity of 31.8 million tons/year of cement, 7.8 million m³/year of concrete, and 23.0 million tons/year of aggregates.

The company's main competitors are InterCement, LafargeHolcim, Cemex, Cimentos LIZ among others.
