= Votorantim Energia =

Brazilian energy company

- Type: Private
- Industry: Electricity
- Founded: 1996
- Headquarters: São Paulo, Brazil
- Key people: Fabio Zanfelice (CEO)
- Products: Electric power Natural gas Hydroelectric; Wind power
- Services: Electricity distribution Natural gas distribution
- Revenue: ▲US$1.1 billion (2015)
- Number of employees: 490
- Parent: Votorantim Group
- Website: www.venergia.com.br(Portuguese) www.venergia.com.br/en (English)

Votorantim Energia is a Brazilian energy company part of conglomerate Votorantim Group created in 1996 as part of the management.

In 2007, generated 63% of the total energy consumed in the Group, being one of the leading industrial investors in the Brazilian electric power sector. Managing energy for more than 180 company, besides the companies of Votorantim, is responsible for 8,2% of industrial consumption of energy, which equals 3% to the total consumption of the country.

The Votorantim Energia also have solutions as generation, management and marketing (buying and selling) of energy, planning energy resources, cogeneration projects and energy efficiency, among others. The company’s principal differential is have in one side one of the biggest private generators, and in the other one manages the biggest energy consumer of the country, the Votorantim S/A.

The company claims to manage 35 hydroelectric plants, some in consortium and others exclusive of Votorantim, with a portfolio that also includes 5 thermoelectric plants, reaching 4,499 MW of installed capacity, and 5% of natural gas management of Brazilian industry consumption.

== Assets ==
- 20 own hydroelectric power plants
- 9 hydroelectric in consortium
- 4 small hydroelectric plants
- 5 thermoelectric plants
- 1 wind power generation plant in construction
