= Frateschi =

INDÚSTRIAS REUNIDAS FRATESCHI LTDA
- Founded: 1958
- Headquarters: Ribeirão Preto, São Paulo (state), Brazil
- Key people: Galileu Frateschi (founder)
- Products: Toys, model railroads
- Website: http://www.frateschi.com.br/

The Brazilian company Indústrias Reunidas Frateschi (known as Frateschi) is a model railroad manufacturer based in Ribeirão Preto, near São Paulo, Brazil. Today Frateschi exports to Argentina, Canada, Chile, Colombia, Peru, Uruguay, United States, France, Spain, Switzerland, South Africa, China, Taiwan, New Zealand and Australia. Frateschi is the only model railroad manufacturer in South America.

== History ==
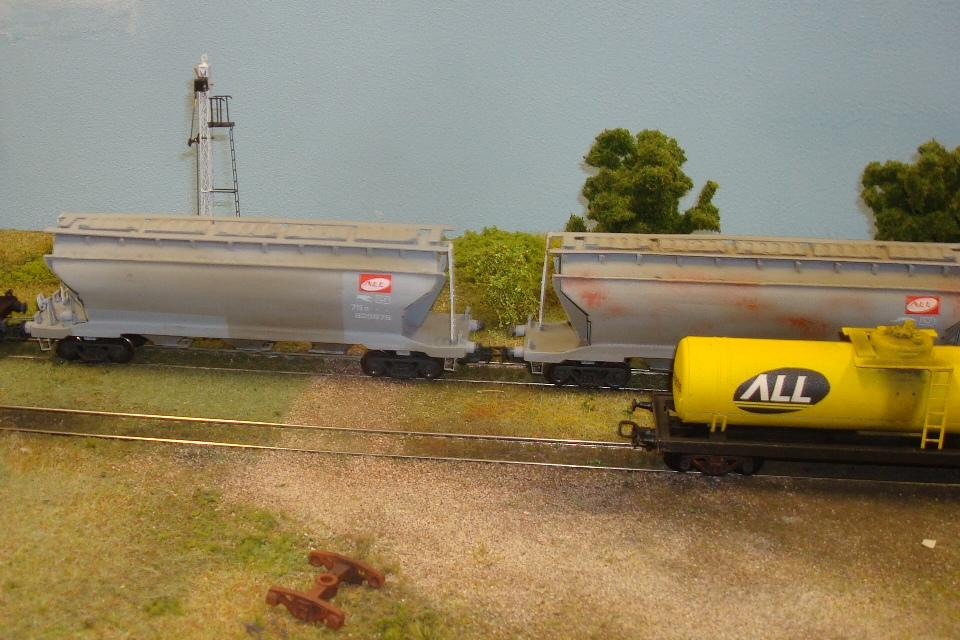

Founded in 1958 as a toy factory by Galileu Frateschi, the company originally produced stuffed animals and wooden furniture. This was followed by the first model railway products such as telephone poles and pylons. In 1967, the toy factory Frateschi has been renamed to "Indústrias Reunidas Frateschi Ltda" to concentrate fully on model trains with its core business focused on Brazilian railways (RFFSA, Fepasa, CPEF, EFS, etc.). In 1993 started a cooperation with Atlas and exported to the United States. The company annually organizes summits to promote the brand and gather model railroaders in cities such as Ribeirao Preto, Campinas and São Carlos. The last one in 2017 (13th edition) was held in Bebedouro - SP.

== Products ==
Frateschi produces only HO scale models. The range includes locomotives, passenger and freight cars, railway tracks, and building kits.

=== Locomotives ===
In March 2015 the following models were produced by Frateschi :

An interesting note on the FA-1 locomotive painted for the Reading Railroad. Frateschi picked the RDG 305 for the prototype. This locomotive had been wreck repaired and was painted incorrectly. The green stripe with gold pinstripes should only run down on the nose. The shop had incorrectly also had the stripe turn up on the nose somewhat creating a diamond around the company’s diamond logo

MODEL	KIND	HOME PRODUCTION	RUNNING	LIVERY
5200	Electric	2011	C-C	CPEF and FEPASA
U23C	Diesel-electric	2008	C-C	RFFSA (Fase I) and MRS
C30-7	Diesel-electric	2007	C-C	MRS, C. Quintella, ALL, Brasil Ferrovias and Rumo
2-C+C-2 or V8	Electric	2004	2-C+C-2	Central, Cia Paulista (Fase II), RFFSA (Fase I) and FEPASA (Fase II e III)
Ten-Wheeler	Steam	1995	4-6-0	Central, Cia Paulista, Mogiana, Pennsylvania, and Denver & Rio Grande Western
Consolidation	Steam	1991	2-8-0	Central, Cia Paulista, Sorocabana, Pennsylvania, Atchison Topeka & Santa Fe, Denver & Rio Grande Western and Baltimore & Ohio
U5B	Diesel-electric	2000	B-B	MRS and RFFSA (Fase I)
G12 / G8	Diesel-electric	1975	B-B	Cia Paulista (Fase II), RFFSA (Fase I), EFVM (Fase II) and FEPASA (Fase II)
G12 A-1-A	Diesel-electric	2006	A-1-A	RFFSA (Fase II), New Zealand Railways (Fase I e II) and Ferrocarriles Argentinos
G22U / G22CU	Diesel-electric	1984	B-B e C-C	G22U - RFFSA (Fase I e II) e ALL; G22CU - RFFSA (Fase I), ALL, Ferrocarriles Argentinos, NCA (Argentina), Metropolitano (Argentina) and Ferrovia (Argentina)
FA-1	Diesel-electric	1989	B-B	RFFSA (Fase I), Central, New York Central, Erie, Lehigh Valley, Pennsylvania, Reading and Soo Line
U-20-C	Diesel-electric	1986	C-C	MRS, FEPASA (Fase II), South African Railways and Ferrosur Roca
AC44i	Diesel-electric	2016	C-C	Rumo (Fase II), MRS, ALL, VLI and Brado
