= Pinhalzinho =

Pinhalzinho may refer to the following places in Brazil:

- Pinhalzinho, Santa Catarina
- Pinhalzinho, São Paulo
