= Maria Helena Moraes Scripilliti =

Brazilian businesswoman

- Born: Maria Helena de Moraes; 1930 or 1931 (age 95–96); Brazil
- Occupations: Co-owner, Votorantim Group
- Spouse: Clovis Scripilliti (deceased)
- Children: 4
- Parent: José Ermírio de Moraes (father)
- Relatives: Ermirio Pereira de Moraes (brother); Antonio Ermirio de Moraes (brother)

Maria Helena Moraes Scripilliti (born 1930 or 1931) is a Brazilian businesswoman, co-owner of the privately held Votorantim Group.

== Early life ==
She was born Maria Helena de Moraes in Brazil, one of four children of the late José Ermírio de Moraes.

== Career ==
Following the death of her father in 2014, she and her brother inherited control of Votorantim Group, one of Brazil's largest privately held companies.

According to Forbes, she has an estimated net worth of $1.7 billion as of September 2020.

== Personal life ==
She was married to the late Clovis Scripilliti, who expanded Votorantim Group in northeast Brazil during the 1960s and 1970s. They had four children, including Clovis Ermírio de Moraes Scripilliti who is vice chairman of Votorantim Group.
