= Ermirio Pereira de Moraes =

- Born: 1932 or 1933 (age 92–93); Brazil
- Education: University of Tulsa
- Occupations: Co-owner, Votorantim Group
- Children: 7
- Parent: Antônio Ermírio de Moraes (father)
- Relatives: Maria Helena de Moraes (sister)

Ermirio Pereira de Moraes Neto (born 1932/1933) is a Brazilian billionaire businessman, co-owner of the privately held Votorantim Group.

== Early life ==
Ermirio Pereira de Moraes is one of two children of the late Antônio Ermírio de Moraes. Moraes earned a bachelor's degree in petroleum engineering from the University of Tulsa in Tulsa, Oklahoma.

== Career ==
Following the death of his father in 2014, he and his sister inherited control of Votorantim Group, one of Brazil's largest privately held companies.

According to Forbes, he has an estimated net worth of $3.2 billion in December 2014.

== Personal life ==
He is married with seven children.
