= Antônio Ermírio de Moraes =

Brazilian businessman (1928–2014)

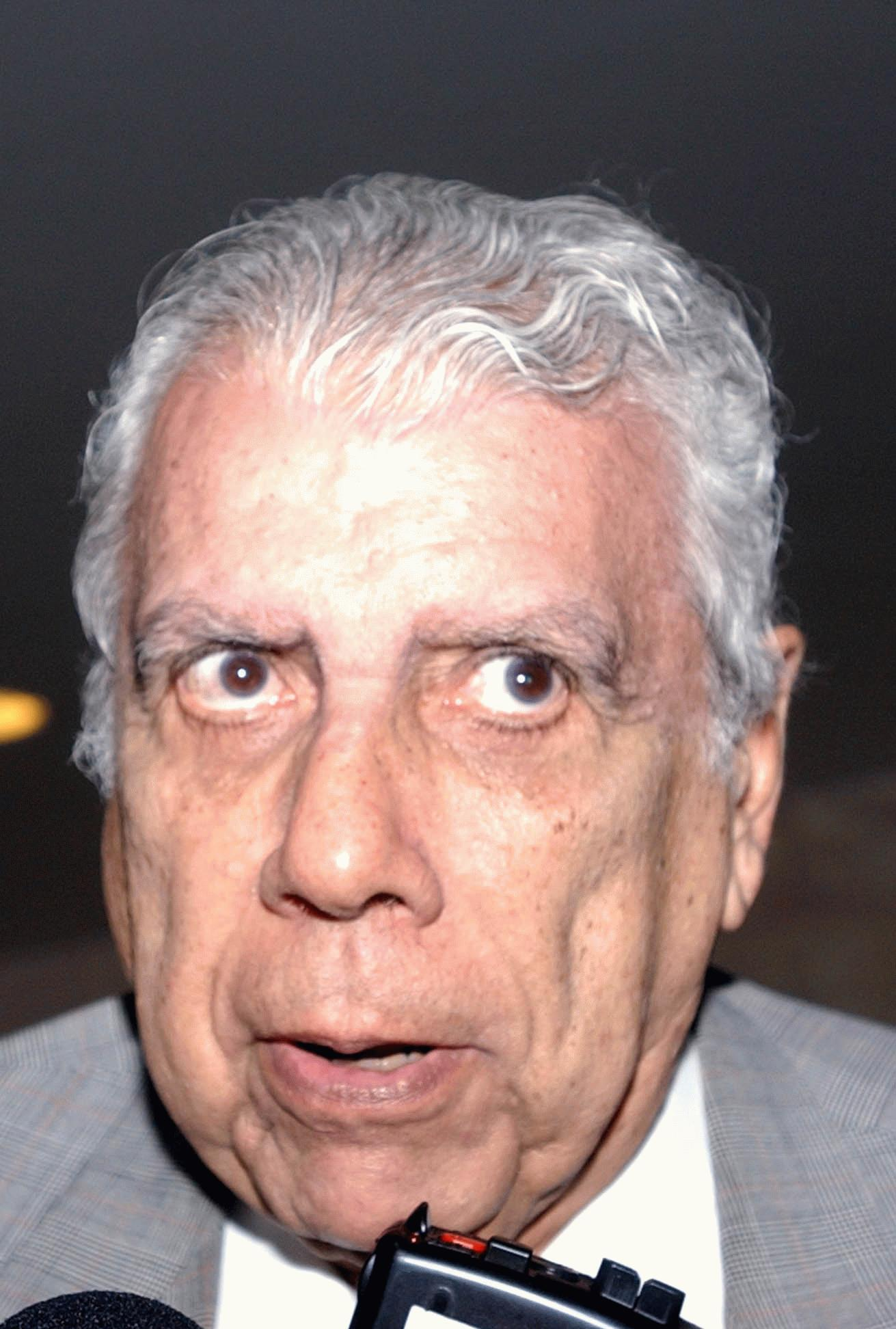
- Born: June 4, 1928; São Paulo, Brazil
- Died: August 24, 2014 (aged 86); São Paulo, Brazil
- Education: Colorado School of Mines
- Occupation: Businessman
- Title: Chairman and CEO, Votorantim Group
- Children: 9
- Relatives: Maria Helena de Moraes (sister); Ermirio Pereira de Moraes (brother); Mario Moraes (grandson)

Antônio Ermírio de Moraes (June 4, 1928 – August 24, 2014) was a Brazilian billionaire businessman and the chairman of the Votorantim Group, one of the country's largest companies, focused on metals, paper, cement and frozen orange juice. He was the grandfather of IndyCar Series driver Mario Moraes.

Moraes was also the president of the Beneficência Portuguesa Hospital – located in São Paulo – which provides 60% of its services to citizens below the poverty line. His grandson Artur Freitas was recently announced as his successor in the presidency. As of 2014, Moraes was ranked 520th on the Forbes list of billionaires, with an estimated fortune of $3.1 billion. During the course of his career, Moraes has had direct political involvement with campaigns to promote democracy, the improvement of the national health system and the generation of job opportunities. He ran for governor of São Paulo State in 1986, but lost the elections. He frequently published articles in newspapers and magazines of national circulation and is a member of the Academia Paulista de Letras.

On his death in 2014, ownership of Votorantim Group passed jointly to his two children, Maria Helena de Moraes and Ermirio Pereira de Moraes.
