= Cimpor =

Portuguese cement group

Cimpor - Cimentos de Portugal, SGPS, S.A.
- Company type: Subsidiary
- Industry: Building materials
- Founded: 1976
- Headquarters: Lisbon, Portugal
- Key people: António Castro Guerra (Chairman), Francisco Lacerda (CEO)
- Products: Cement, construction aggregate, concrete, mortar
- Revenue: €2.316 billion (2010)
- Operating income: €409.1 million (2010)
- Net income: €241.8 million (2010)
- Total assets: €5.385 billion (end 2010)
- Total equity: €2.230 billion (end 2010)
- Number of employees: 8,490 (end 2010)
- Parent: InterCement
- Website: www.cimpor.pt

Cimpor - Cimentos de Portugal is the largest Portuguese cement group, operating in eleven countries - Portugal, Spain, Morocco, Brazil, Tunisia, Turkey, Cape Verde, Mozambique, China, Egypt and South Africa, involved in manufacturing and marketing cement, hydraulic lime, concrete and aggregates, precast concrete and dry mortars. The Brazilian company Camargo Corrêa is the owner of the company.

In Portugal, Cimpor has major factories in Coimbra (Souselas), Vila Franca de Xira (Alhandra), Loulé and Figueira da Foz (Cabo Mondego).

Cimpor is listed on the Euronext Lisbon stock exchange and is a member of the benchmark PSI-20 Portuguese stock exchange index. The company was owned by two Brazilian conglomerates which built up stakes in February 2010 in order to thwart a €3.9 billion takeover bid from steel maker Companhia Siderúrgica Nacional (CSN): Camargo Corrêa holds 32.9% and the Votorantim Group 21.2% (of which 17.3% was purchased from Lafarge and 3.7% from Cinveste). A 9.6% stake in Cimpor held by the bank Caixa Geral de Depósitos is also imputable to Votorantim due to an agreement between the parties. In 2012 with the purchase of additional shares and the exchange of certain assets to the Votorantim Group, Camargo Corrêa through its subsidiary InterCement now holds 94.8% stake in Cimpor and becomes its sole shareholder, with the remaining shares being traded on Euronext Lisbon.

On 21 June 2017, Cimpor's shareholders voted for Camargo Corrêa (owner of 95,1% of total shares) to acquire all of Cimpor's public shares in a move to remove the company from the Lisbon stock exchange.

The ownership structure has undergone significant consolidation within the global building materials sector. Following its acquisition by Camargo Corrêa in 2012, the company's regional assets were subject to further strategic divestments. In January 2019, the OYAK Group acquired the entirety of Cimpor's business units in Portugal and Cape Verde, with Taiwan Cement Corporation participating as a minority shareholder. In early 2024, Taiwan Cement Corporation finalized the acquisition of 100% of Cimpor's Portugal and Cape Verde's assets. The transaction was part of a broader expansion strategy aimed at strengthening TCC's footprint in significant geographies. As a result of this acquisition, TCC ascended to the position of the third-largest operator in the global cement market.
