= Fepasa complex =

Former railway station and current cultural complex in Jundiaí, Brazil

- Complexo Fepasa
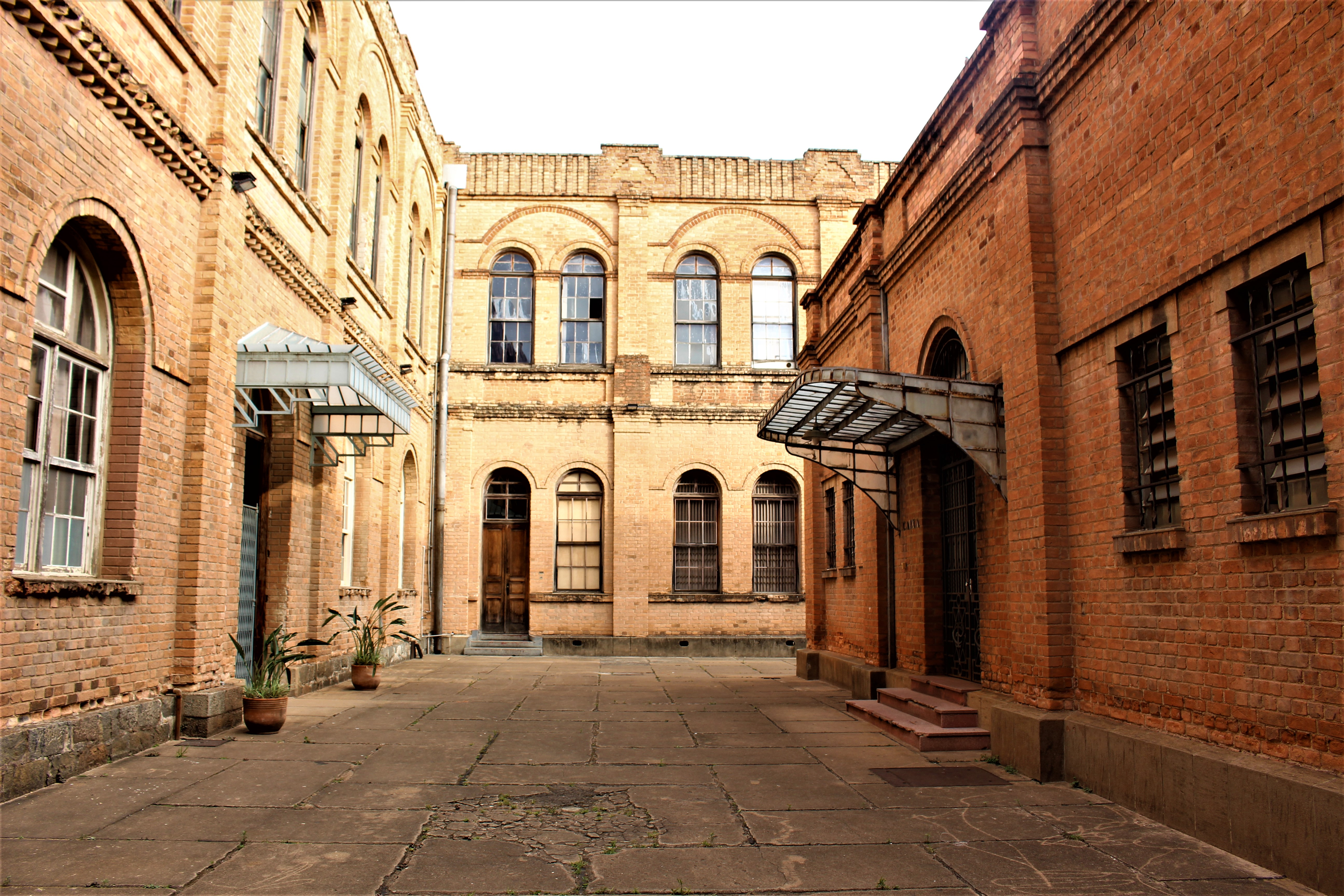
- Established: 1897
- Location: Jundiaí, São Paulo, Brazil
- Coordinates: 23°10′53″S 46°52′56″W
- Type: Cultural center, historical heritage building
- Architect: Gustavo Adolpho da Silveira
- Location of Fepasa complex

The Fepasa Complex, formerly the railway workshop of the Companhia Paulista de Estradas de Ferro, is located in the city of Jundiaí, São Paulo, Brazil. Established in the early 20th century, it served as a site for the maintenance of locomotives and rolling stock. The complex is now recognized as a historical landmark, reflecting the region’s industrial heritage.

== History ==
Companhia Paulista de Estradas de Ferro had a workshop in the city of Campinas responsible for the maintenance of its locomotives and cars. Due to the large work flow, the company decided to build a new, more spacious workshop capable of performing a greater number of services; the city of Jundiaí was chosen because of its strategic location. In 1897, the new workshop was inaugurated and operated for many decades performing maintenance services, assembly, and painting of locomotives.

In the 1960s, Companhia Paulista de Estradas de Ferro was nationalized and in 1971 it was incorporated into the Ferrovia Paulista S/A (Fepasa). In 2001, the Complex's application for a heritage site was submitted. This was approved in 2004 and covers all the buildings in the perimeter. Currently, the complex is partially used, housing some sections of the Jundiaí City Hall, the Companhia Paulista Museum, as well as Poupatempo and Faculty of Technology (Fatec) units. Other parts of the complex are in ruins.

== Structure ==
The building of the complex began in 1892 and the project was carried out by Gustavo Adolpho da Silveira. The earthmoving works were executed by the partners Contrucci and Giorgi under the supervision of engineer Antônio Soares de Gouvêa, and the mason in charge was João Normanton. Among the foreign companies involved in the process, Phoenix Iron Works stood out as the one that exported the metallic superstructure that composes the shed roof.

The building was divided as follows: The north wing, for the repair of locomotives; the south wing, for machinery, tools, and other services auxiliary to repair; and the central wing, where the office, inspectorate, and general storeroom were installed. During its several years of operation, the complex suffered different alterations. It contains a 1953 ALCO PA2 in very bad conditions.
