= Bauru station (NOB) =

20th-century railway station in Bauru, Brazil

Bauru station (NOB) Estação de Bauru (NOB)
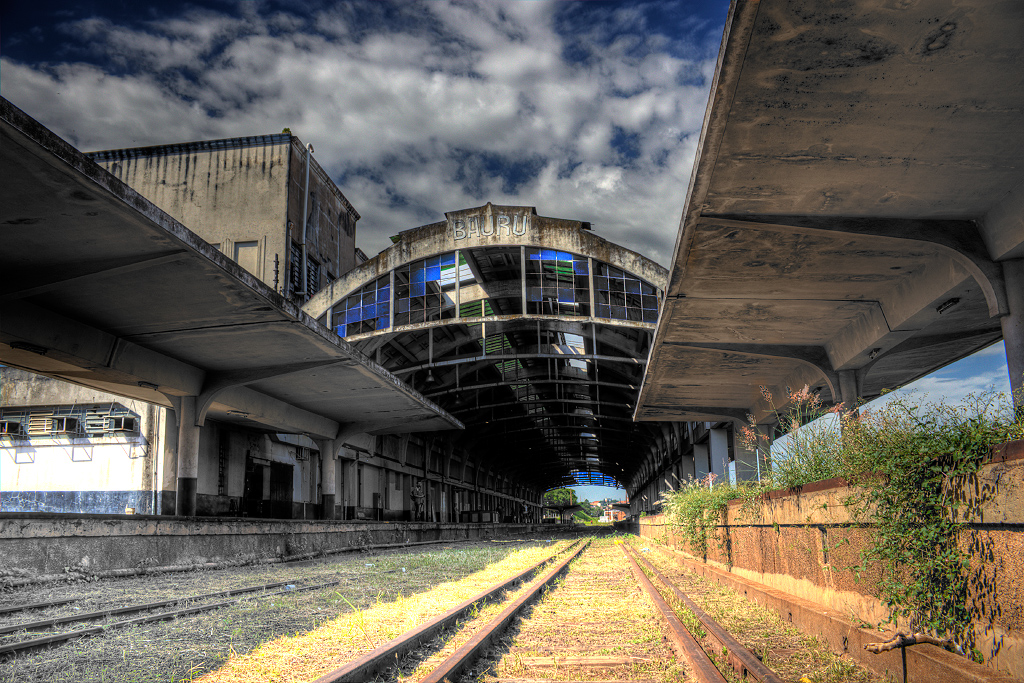

General information
- Coordinates: 22°19′25″S 49°4′43″W
- Manager: Estrada de Ferro Noroeste do Brasil (1906-1975); RFFSA (1975-1999); National Institute of Historic and Artistic Heritage (1999-2006); Bauru City Hall (2006-)
- Line: Trunk Line (Estrada de Ferro Noroeste do Brasil)
- Tracks: 2

Other information
- Status: Abandoned

History
- Opened: 27 September 1906
- Closed: 14 March 2001
- Rebuilt: 1939
Location

Bauru station
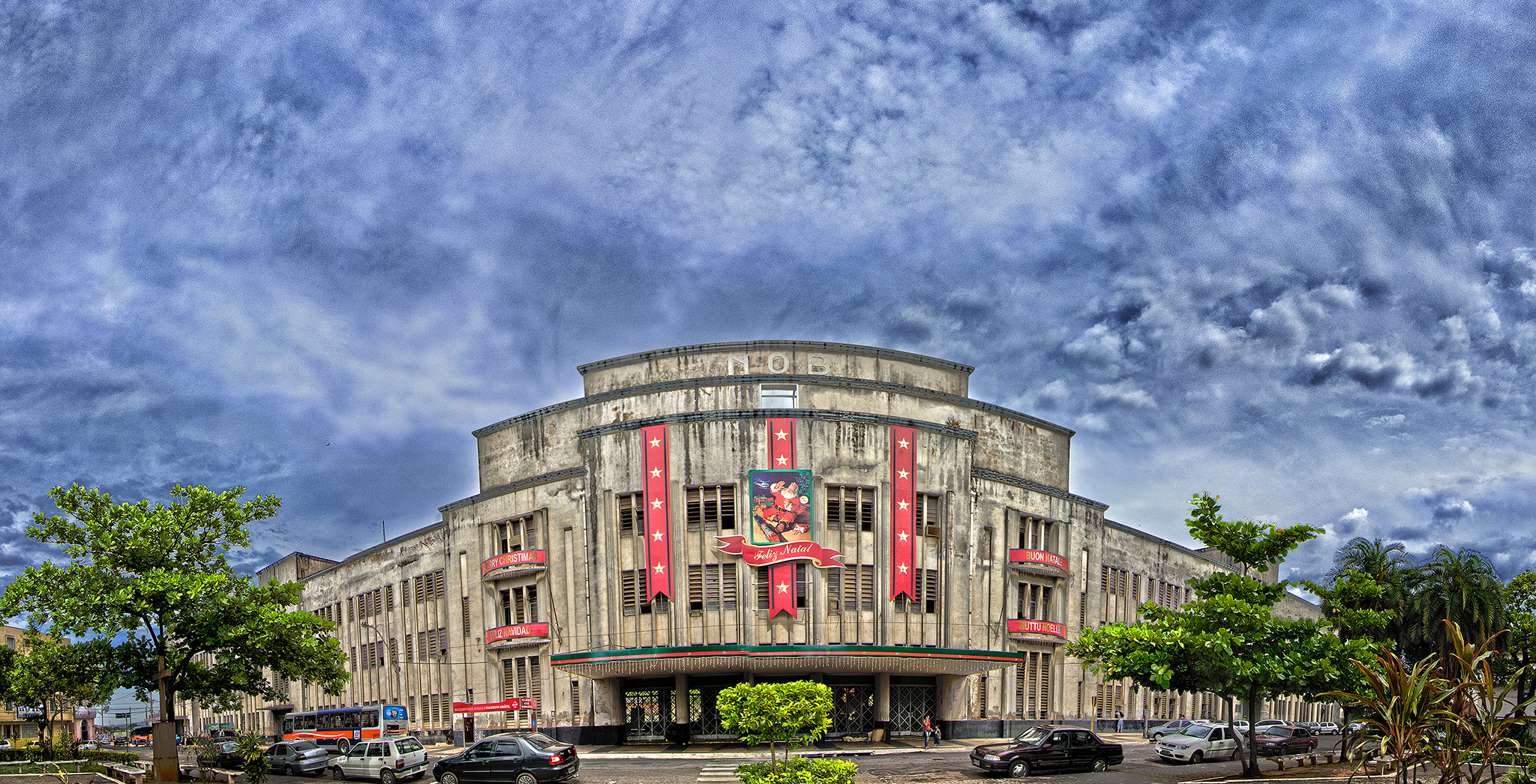
- Interactive map of the Bauru station area

General information
- Architectural style: Art Deco
- Location: Bauru, Brazil
- Completed: 1939

Design and construction
- Awards: Listed property: Council for the Defense of Bauru's Cultural Heritage (1999); CONDEPHAAT (under study)

The Bauru Station (NOB) is the starting point of the Estrada de Ferro Noroeste do Brasil (NOB) ("Brazil's Northwest Railroad"). Opened in 1906, it consisted of a simple wooden building attached to the Bauru Station of the Sorocabana Railroad. With the growth of traffic, the wooden building was temporarily extended until the construction of a definitive station opened in 1939. The last long-distance passenger trains left the station in 2001. In 2006, the administration was transferred to the Bauru City Hall, which had been managing it since then.

== History ==
=== First station (1906–1938) ===
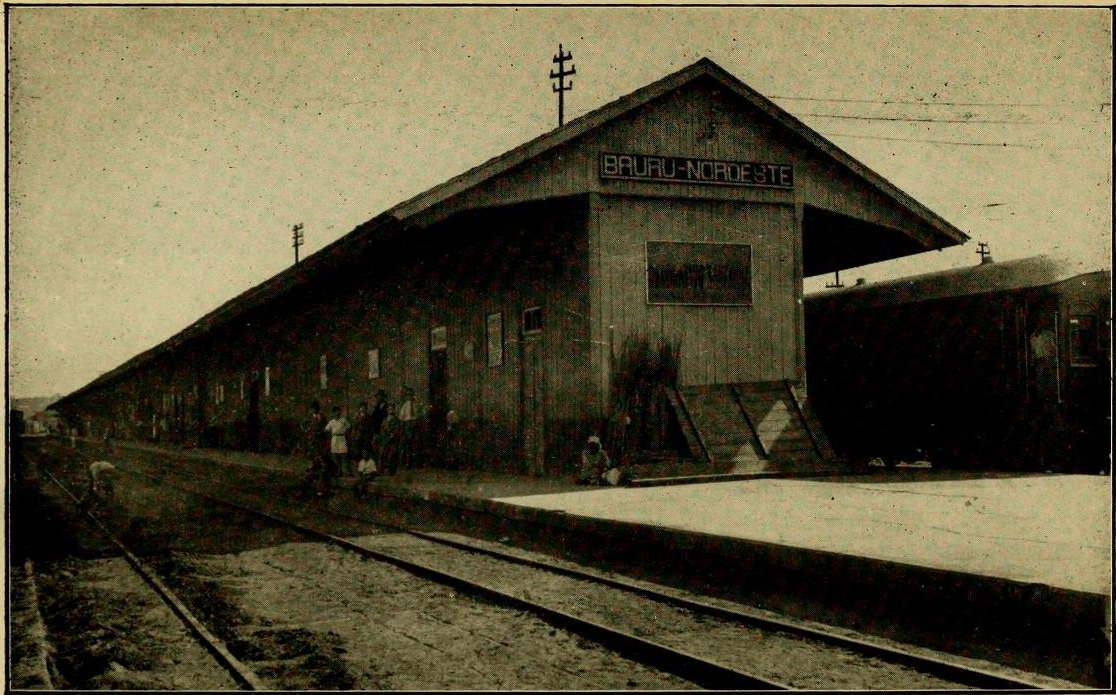
First Bauru station of the Northwest, undated.

In 1904, the Companhia Estrada de Ferro Noroeste do Brasil was created. Composed of Belgian, French, and Brazilian financing, its objective was to link Bauru to the city of Cuiabá. Work on the railroad began in November 1904, starting from the Bauru station of the Sorocabana Railroad, completed in July 1905. The Bauru station of the Noroeste was erected in the vicinity of the Sorocabana station. Consisting of a wooden building, it was inaugurated together with the railroad on September 27, 1906. Even so, the Noroeste operation still used the Sorocabana station as a boarding point for some time. The first Noroeste station became smaller in the face of growing passenger boarding. With the arrival of Companhia Paulista tracks in 1910, Bauru was consolidated as an important São Paulo railroad junction.

With the design of a new station in the 1930s, the wooden station experienced its final years. At the end of the construction work on the new station in 1938, it was demolished while passengers used temporary platforms until the new station was opened.

=== Second station (1939 -) ===
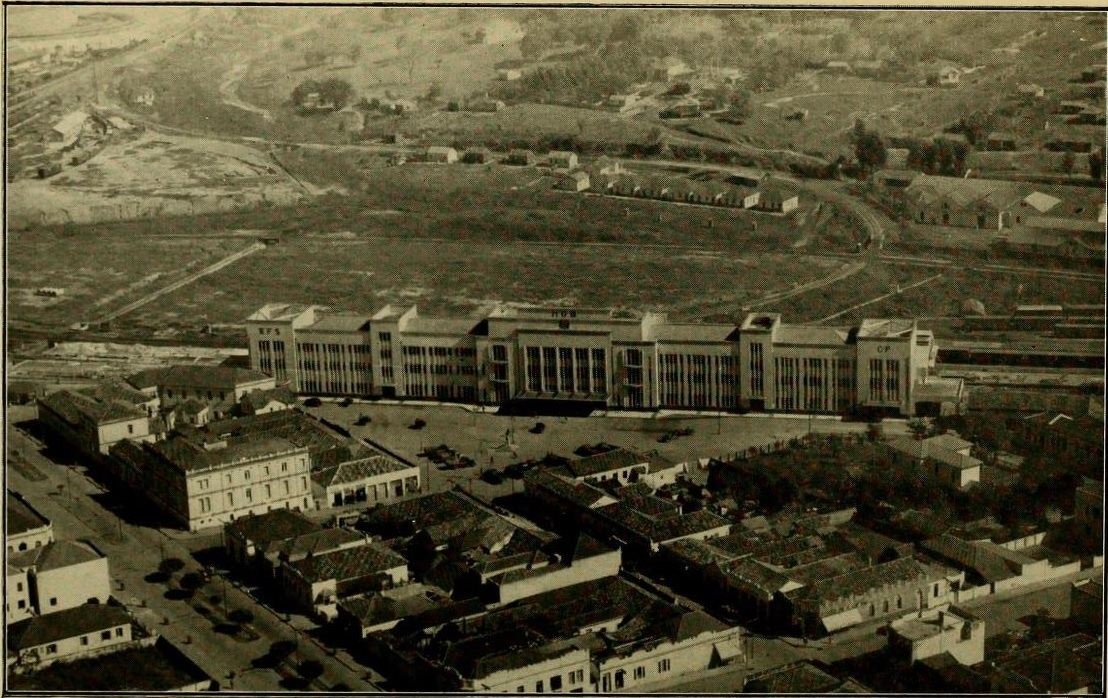
Circa 1938

At the end of the 1910s, the Noroeste do Brasil Railroad situation was precarious. It was in poor condition, the stations were made out of wood, provisional and with a rotten structure, and employees were poorly paid. The new Minister of Transportation and Public Works José Pires do Rio appointed engineer Arlindo Luz (1871-1959) to run Noroeste and improve the railroad. With the investiture of engineer Luz, the administrative headquarters of the railroad was transferred from Rio de Janeiro to Bauru. The lack of adequate space to house the company's offices made engineer Luz sponsor the project of a new and bigger railroad station, capable of housing the three railroads that crossed Bauru (Noroeste, Sorocabana, and Paulista). Completed in 1921, the project ended up abandoned due to a lack of resources and the tumultuous political moment of the 1920s, with the federal government fighting the Tenentist revolts.

The new Noroeste station project was only resumed in the following decade. In 1933, the São Paulo government proposed leasing Noroeste and building a new station for Sorocabana to house the three railroads. The proposal was shelved, but the project for the new Noroeste station remained on the agenda until it was approved by the Ministry of Transportation and Public Works in July 1934. The ministry wanted to carry out the work with financial assistance from the other two railroads benefiting from the project (Sorocabana and Paulista). To build the station and carry out other modernization works on the Noroeste, the São Paulo state government and the Companhia Paulista de Estradas de Ferro set up the Sociedade Melhoramentos da E.F. Noroeste do Brasil Limitada on 18 August 1934. The Estrada de Ferro Noroeste do Brasil became responsible for supervising the services.

Construction was started by Sociedade Melhoramentos on December 5, 1935, and by June 1936 the station's structure was practically complete. Although the work on the station was fast, the remodeling and expansion of the railroad yard proceeded slowly. In 1939, there was still land being expropriated for the construction of the patio.

The new station was inaugurated on 1 September 1939, However, the Sociedade Melhoramentos completed complementary work only in 1942. The first floor of the building housed the ticket office, baggage dispatch, and technical rooms of Noroeste, Paulista, and Sorocabana, and the administration offices of Noroeste were located on the first and second floors. In 1959, the station received 28 daily trains, 16 from Companhia Paulista, 8 from Noroeste (recently incorporated into the Federal Railway Network), and 4 from Sorocabana. It was only in 1971 that Sorocabana and Paulista (later Fepasa) announced an agreement to unify ticket office services, baggage dispatch, and technical rooms. Thus, Noroeste employees were in charge of these services, including Companhia Paulista and Sorocabana trains, freeing up their employees for other stations.

In 1976, the last passenger train services of the extinct Sorocabana (incorporated by Fepasa) were extinguished. In the early 1990s, the Bauru-Corumbá train had only 2 weekly departures. With the drop in passengers, the Federal Railway Network deactivated the train in January 1993, so that only Fepasa passenger trains provided services at the Bauru station.

The last passenger trains were deactivated by concessionaire Ferroban (Fepasa's successor) on March 14, 2001.
