= Companhia Brasileira de Alumínio =

Aluminium producer in São Paulo, Brazil

Companhia Brasileira de Alumínio (Brazilian Aluminium Company)
- Type: Publicly Listed Company at B3 under ticker CBAV3
- Industry: Aluminium
- Founded: 1955; 71 years ago
- Headquarters: Alumínio, São Paulo (state), Brazil
- Key people: Antônio Ermírio de Moraes, (CEO)
- Products: aluminium products, aluminium alloys
- Revenue: ▲US$ 2.8 billion (2009)
- Number of employees: 6,500
- Parent: Votorantim Group
- Website: cba.com.br

Companhia Brasileira de Alumínio (CBA; Brazilian Aluminium Company) is the largest aluminium producer in Brazil claiming to have a total annual production of around 360,000 tonnes as of 2026.

It is headquartered in the city of São Paulo.

== History ==
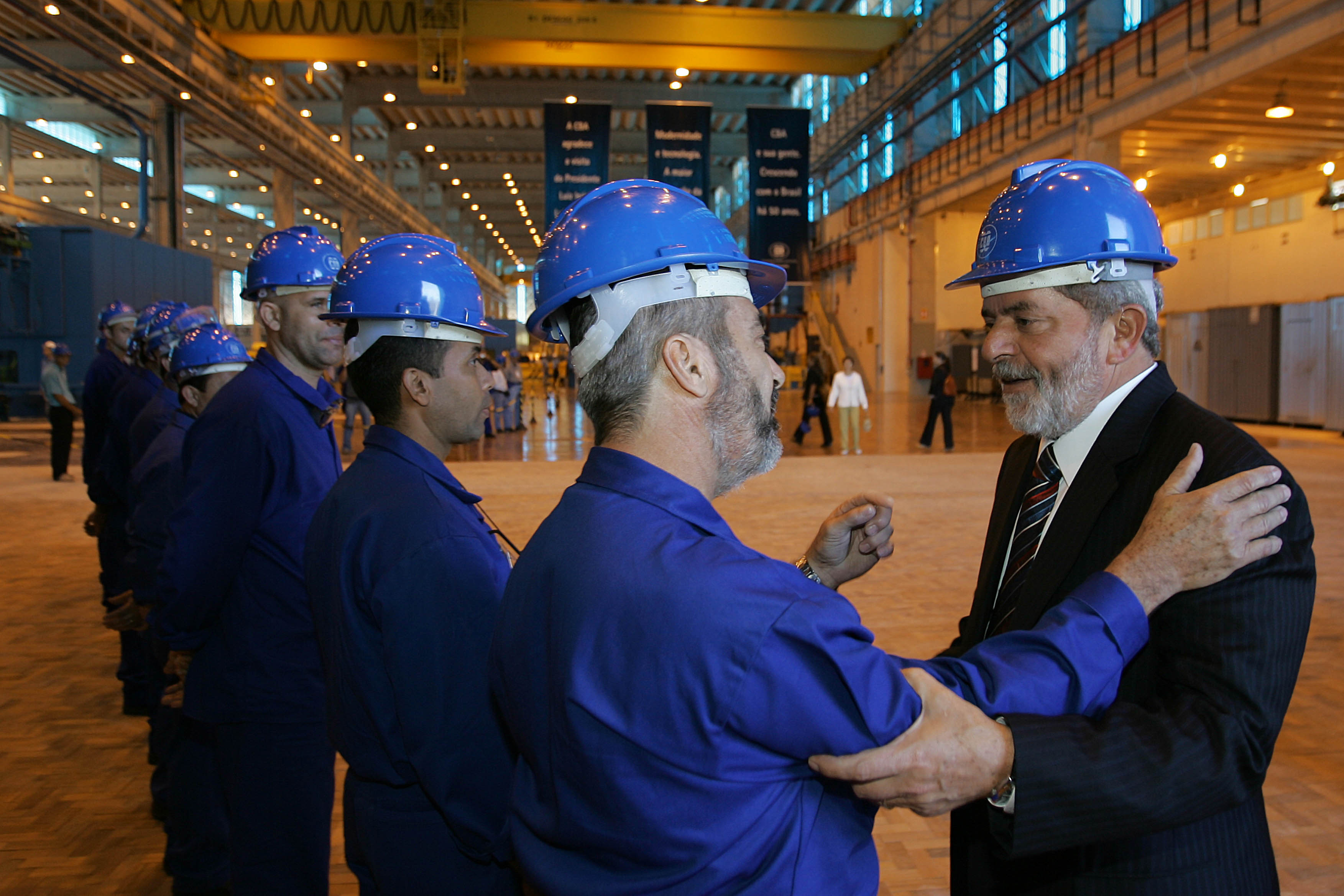
Brazilian president Luiz Inácio Lula da Silva visits CBA in 2006

Established on June 4, 1955, CBA was the first aluminium plant in Brazil producing 4,000 tonnes/year. After seventy years in 2025 the company had a producing capacity of 360,000 tonnes/year.

In 2026, Aluminum Corporation of China (Chinalco) with Rio Tinto bought a 68.596% controlling stake in CBA from the Votorantim Group for nearly a billion dollars.

Now the company has a large distribution chain all across Brazil including a sea terminal in the Port of Santos.

== Other businesses ==
=== Mining ===
CBA has some bauxite mines in Poços de Caldas. After acquiring a 10% stake in mining company Mineração Rio do Norte, CBA now holds bauxite mines in the South-East part of Paraná State and has another mine in the municipality of Cataguases and Itamarati de Minas in Minas Gerais State. There is another mine "Miraí" due for opening in 2007 which alone will produce 3 million tonnes of bauxite per year.

=== Electric power ===
The company produces 60% of the energy in the 18 hydroelectric power plants it owns all over Brazil and has around 13,000 clients.
