= Votorantim Group =

Brazilian conglomerate

Votorantim S.A.
- Type: Private
- Industry: Industrial and financial holding companies
- Founded: 1918 in Votorantim, São Paulo
- Headquarters: São Paulo, Brazil
- Key people: Eduardo Vassimon (Chairman); João H. Schmidt (CEO)
- Products: Building materials, finance, aluminium, clean and renewable energy, metals and mining, orange juice, long steel, growth, real estate, infrastructure
- Revenue: ▲$ 10,4 billion (2023)
- Net income: ▲$ 2,1 billion (2023)
- Number of employees: 36,507
- Subsidiaries: AcerBrag; CBA; Citrosuco; Nexa Resources; Votorantim Cimentos; Auren Energia; Altre; Banco BV; 23S Capital; CCR
- Website: www.votorantim.com.br/en

Votorantim S.A. is a permanently capitalized investment holding company, with a long-term investment approach. Its portfolio companies operate in 16 countries and in different economic sectors, as building materials, finance, aluminum, clean and renewable energy, metals and mining, orange juice, long steel, growth, real estate, and infrastructure.

Votorantim is one of the few Brazilian companies with investment grade rating by the three main rating agencies in the world: Standard & Poors, Fitch Ratings and Moody's.

The company is also a member of FCLTGlobal, a non-profit organization that produces research and tools that promote long-term investment and business strategies, and signatory of the UN Global Compact since 2011.

== History ==
It was founded in 1918 by José Ermírio de Moraes, an engineer from Pernambuco. Its model of corporate governance assures the Ermírio Moraes family strategic controlling positions in the executive board. The Brazilian businessman Antônio Ermírio de Moraes was the representative of the family business, while non-family professionals are at the head of the Business Units.

== Overview ==
In 2021, Votorantim and CPP Investments announced a plan to consolidate energy assets in Brazil, creating a company to be listed on the ‘Novo Mercado’ segment of the B3 Stock Change. In 2022, this company was named Auren Energia and debuted on Brazil's stock market.

== Subsidiaries ==
The company’s portfolio includes leading companies from different economy sectors. They are:

- Votorantim Cimentos — Cement
- Banco BV — Finance and banking
- Companhia Brasileira de Aluminio — Aluminum
- Auren Energia — Energy
- Nexa Resources — Metals and mining
- Citrosuco — Orange juice
- Acerbrag — Long steel
- Altre — Real estate
- 23S Capital — Growth
- CCR — Infrastructure and mobility

== Board and Management ==
- Eduardo Vassimon (Chairman)
- João Schmidt (CEO)
