= Centro (Campinas) =

Neighborhood in the city of Campinas, São Paulo, Brazil

- Neighborhood
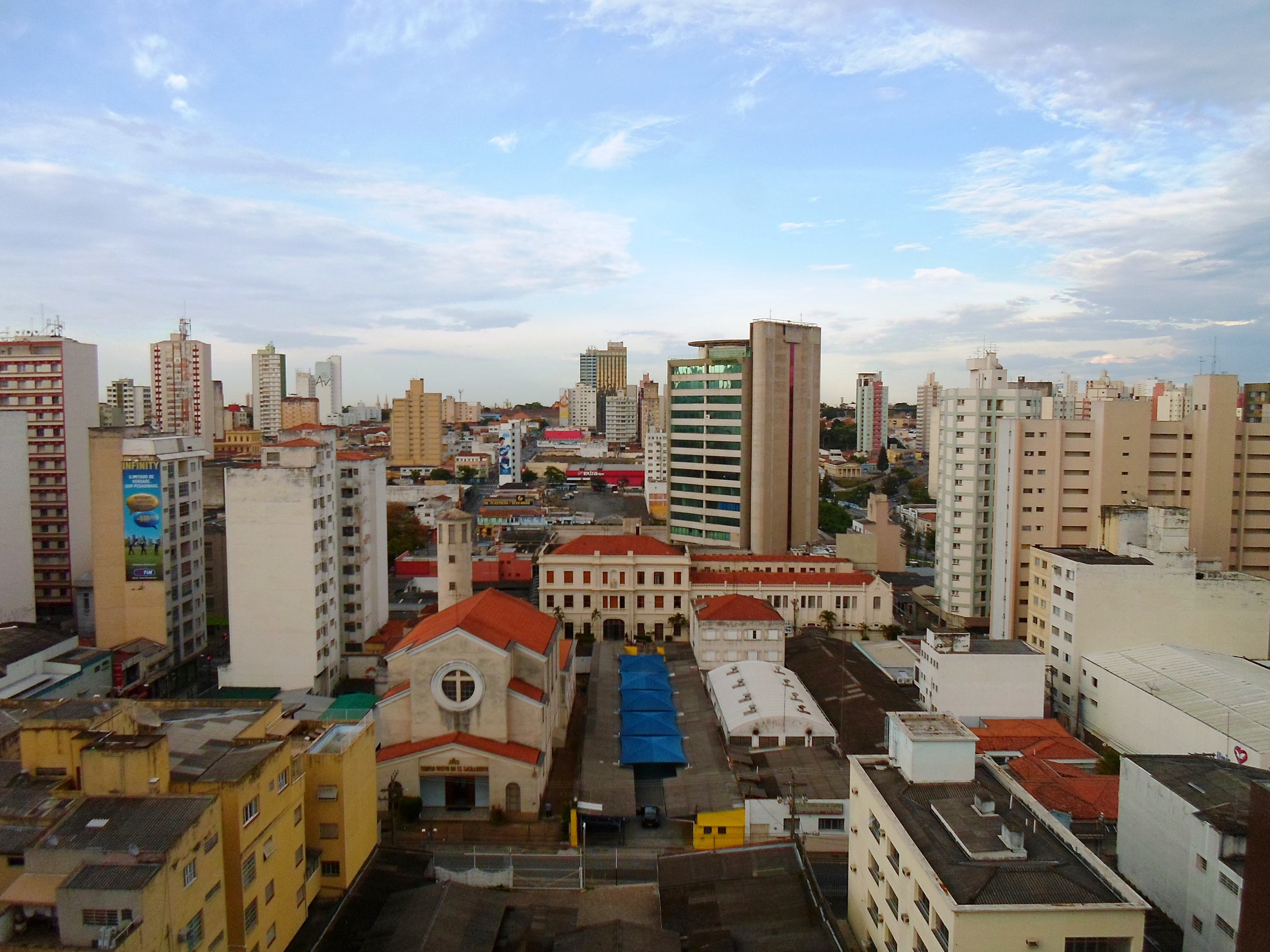
- Panoramic view of Centro
- Interactive map of Centro
- Location within São Paulo State Location within Brazil
- Coordinates: 22°54′20″S 47°03′39″W
- Country: Brazil
- State: São Paulo
- Metropolitan region: Campinas
- Municipality: Campinas
- Founded: July 14, 1774
- Founder: Francisco Barreto Leme do Prado
- Localities: List: Vila Lídia

Area
  - Total: 1.5 km^{2} (0.58 sq mi)
- Time zone: UTC−03:00 (BRT)
- Area code: +55 19

Centro is a neighborhood and region within the municipality of Campinas, in the state of São Paulo, which is home to a significant portion of the commerce and services of both the municipality and the Campinas metropolitan area (RMC).

It covers an area of approximately 1.5 square kilometers and is bounded by the following avenues and streets: Aquidaban, Boaventura do Amaral, Barreto Leme, Anchieta, Irmã Serafina, Orozimbo Maia, Francisco Glicério, Doutor Mascarenhas, Lix da Cunha, and Waldemar Paschoal. To the northwest is Guanabara; to the northeast and east is Cambuí; to the southeast is Bosque; to the south is Ponte Preta; to the southwest and south is Vila Industrial; and to the west is Bonfim.

== History ==
Colorized postcard of Bento Quirino Square, circa 1910

The city was officially founded under the name “Distrito das Campinas de Mato Grosso de Jundiaí” with the construction of a mud-brick chapel on July 14, 1774, on the site where the landmark in Bento Quirino Square stands today, near the tomb-monument of composer Antônio Carlos Gomes, and which was one of the three small fields (hence the name “Campinas”) along the route taken by the tropeiros heading north.

The area that is now the city of Centro began to be settled in the first half of the 18th century, serving as a resting place for tropeiros along the route opened between 1721 and 1730 leading to the mines of Goiás, the so-called Estrada dos Goiases. Coming from Taubaté, the land grant holder Francisco Barreto Leme do Prado settled in the region between 1739 and 1744 and became the central figure in the settlement, donating the land on which the town’s first chapel was built.

In May 1774, the governor of the Captaincy of São Paulo, known as Morgado de Mateus, formally authorized Barreto Leme to organize the settlement, including the layout of its streets and lots. The town’s founding was celebrated on July 14, 1774, the date on which the first Mass was celebrated in a temporary chapel, elevating the settlement to the status of a parish dedicated to Our Lady of the Immaculate Conception of the Campinas of Mato Grosso. In 1797, the parish was elevated to the status of a town, under the name Vila de São Carlos, gaining independence from Jundiaí; in 1842, it became a city under the name Campinas, at a time when coffee farming was gradually replacing sugarcane as the region’s main economic activity.

=== Coffee cycle and slavery ===
During the 19th century, the area that today corresponds to the city center established itself as the political and commercial hub of one of the Empire’s wealthiest coffee-based economies, sustained by slave labor. At the end of the 19th century, Campinas accounted for about 15% of the country's coffee production, which came from more than 270 farms. In 1887, on the eve of abolition, Campinas had the largest enslaved population in the province of São Paulo, 9,986 people, more than the state capital itself, valued at 6,851 contos de réis. The wealth generated by coffee cultivation made Campinas, in the decades leading up to 1889, a city of national significance, combining political influence with significant involvement in the national economy. Heavily dependent on slavery for its economy, it was the last city in the country to effectively abolish slavery.

=== Yellow fever epidemics (1889–1897) ===
Downtown in the context of the yellow fever epidemic of 1889.

The coffee boom was brought to a halt not only by the end of slavery in Brazil but also by a series of yellow fever epidemics that struck the city beginning in 1889, at a time when it was still believed that the disease was confined to the coast. New outbreaks would occur in 1890, 1892, 1896, and 1897, always beginning in February. The peak occurred in March and April, with a decline in May, and by June there were no new cases of the disease. In the 1889 epidemic alone, approximately 1,200 people died, and three-quarters of the population, then numbering about twenty thousand, left the city within a few weeks, in an exodus that virtually emptied the central urban core. In 1886, the municipality of Campinas had a population of 41,253. There are no official figures for the year of the epidemic, but it is estimated that the urban population was between 15,000 and 20,000, and that between 3,000 and 5,000 remained in the city. Nearly half of them died.

Monument to Bento Quirino

The response to the epidemic, led by the State Health Commission headed by Dr. Emílio Ribas, transformed the central area into a veritable public health laboratory, with disinfection campaigns and sanitary demolitions, culminating, by the early 20th century, in the experimental confirmation, carried out in São Paulo, of Cuban physician Carlos Finlay’s theory, according to which the virus was transmitted by the Stegomyia fasciata mosquito (now known as Aedes aegypti), which refocused the fight against the disease on vector control. The episode left such a lasting mark on local memory that it earned Campinas the nickname “phoenix city.”

=== 20th Century: the height of its glory and the beginning of Its decline ===
Downtown Campinas in the 1940s

The first half of the 20th century, the Downtown area established itself as the main, and, for decades, virtually the only hub for commerce, services, and leisure in Campinas, a situation that the press and urban studies of the city often contrast with the region’s subsequent decline. Beginning in 1980, this leading role came under challenge from the city’s first large shopping malls: Iguatemi Campinas, which opened that year in Vila Brandina, was the first shopping mall in Brazil located outside a state capital and gradually began to attract mid- to high-end retailers that had previously been concentrated in the downtown are. Other large complexes, such as Parque Dom Pedro Shopping and Galleria Shopping, followed in the subsequent decades, intensifying competition.

== Historical and architectural heritage ==
The downtown area is home to a significant portion of the city’s listed heritage sites, including:

- Our Lady of the Conception Cathedral, located in Praça José Bonifácio, also known as Largo da Catedral, which was inaugurated in 1883 and listed in 1988
- Estação Cultura, built of English bricks in the Victorian style and converted into a cultural center in 2002, designated a historic landmark in 1982
- Mercado Municipal de Campinas, designed by Ramos de Azevedo and inaugurated on April 12, 1908, in what was then Praça Carlos Botelho, also a designated historic site
- Palácio dos Azulejos, city hall from 1908 to 1968, now home to a cultural institution whose museum of sacred art houses pieces from the 18th to the 20th centuries
- Basilica of Our Lady of Carmel, a Catholic place of worship in the city
- Carlos Gomes Square, traditional square in the city center.
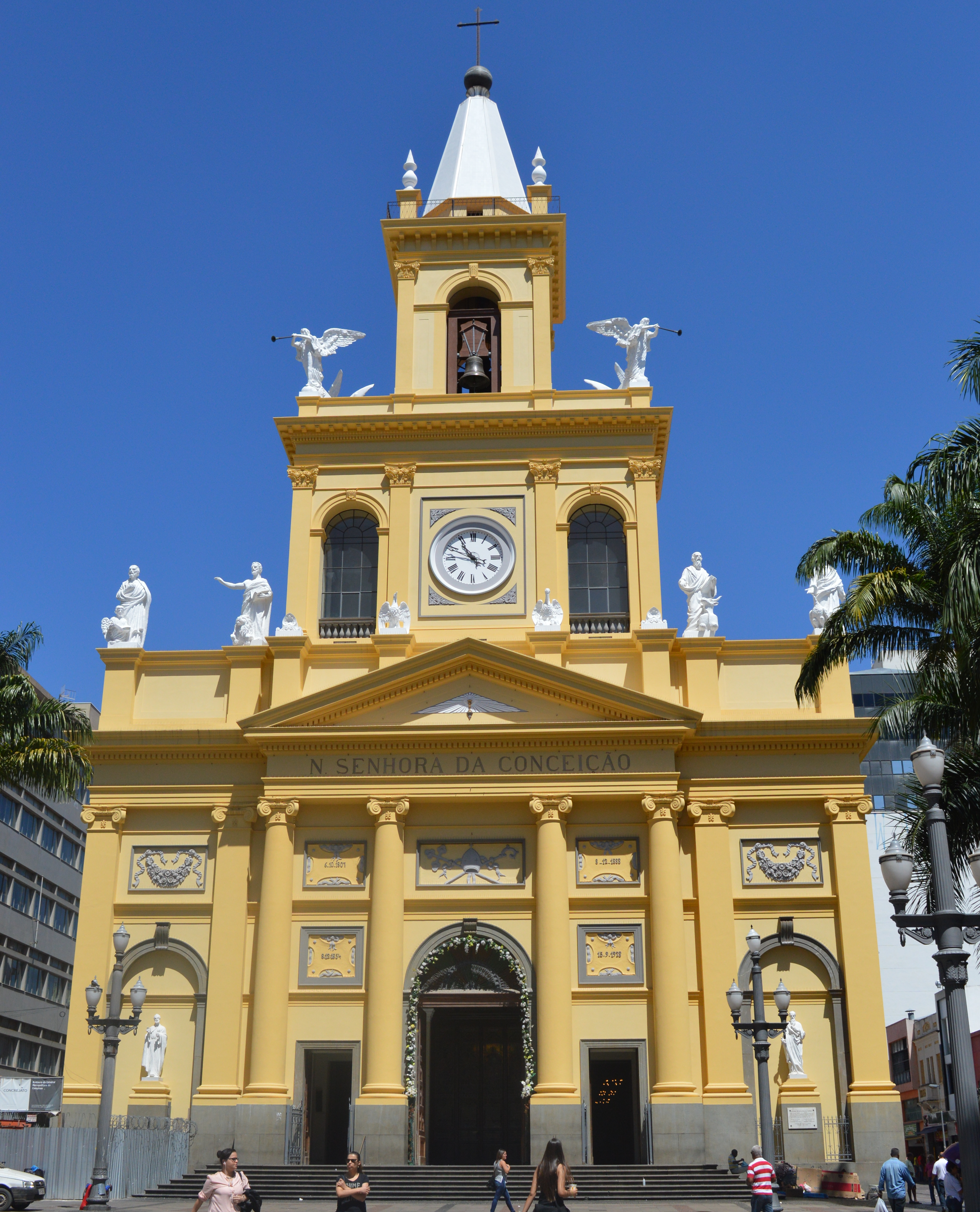
Metropolitan Cathedral

Estação Cultura

Mercado Municipal de Campinas

Palácio dos Azulejos

Basilica of Our Lady of Mount Carmel

Carlos Gomes Square

== Economy ==
A view of Rua 13 de Maio

The region remains an important hub for popular commerce, with Rua 13 de Maio serving as its main street-level commercial artery, historically occupied by department stores and, more recently, also by informal vendors (street vendors). In 2024, experts attributed the closure of traditional stores on Rua 13 de Maio, including Skina Magazine, Americanas, and Pernambucanas, primarily to competition from e-commerce, which intensified during the COVID-19 pandemic, triggering a chain reaction that led to a reduction in foot traffic, a decline in business at bars and restaurants,and an increased sense of insecurity in the area.

== Contemporany ==
=== Urban decay ===
Social situation in Centro, Campinas, 2026

Since at least the early 2000s, the local press has repeatedly documented physical and social decay in parts of the city center, with an emphasis on the area between Estação Cultura, the Central Bus Terminal, and the Cury Viaduct, historically known as Boca do Lixo, in a free-translation to English skid row. There, over the decades, shops and hotels that once served rail travelers and traditional families have given way to hotspots for prostitution, drug trafficking, and unlicensed boarding houses.

The area is also home to a significant portion of the city’s homeless population, with frequent reports of crack cocaine use on streets such as Rua Cônego Cipião, near the Central Bus Terminal. Surveys conducted by the Campinas City Government in partnership with the FEAC Foundation found that 73% of 200 homeless people interviewed reported consuming alcohol daily, and another survey found that 64.5% of 186 respondents used some form of narcotic every day; since then, the Municipal Guard has maintained “Operation Safer Downtown” to curb crime in the area.

Social conditions in downtown Campinas in front of the Magazine Luiza store in 2026.

News reports from 2024 and 2026 also document piles of trash, damaged sidewalks, graffiti, and vandalism targeting public monuments in various parts of the neighborhood, including historic squares such as Carlos Gomes Square; In 2013, then-Mayor Jonas Donizette (PSB) stated that the city government spent an average of R$ 500,000 per month on repairs to vandalized spaces and equipment. Shop owners report that they have started closing their stores earlier and installing security bars due to a sense of insecurity, a trend that, according to the press, has intensified since the COVID-19 pandemic.

The commercial exodus has also left physical traces: a frequently cited example is a commercial building from the 1990s near the Cury Viaduct and the municipal street market, informally known as Galeria Pajé, which once housed about sixty commercial units and has remained virtually empty and vandalized for over a decade.

=== Debate on "depopulation" ===
The diagnosis of “decline” or “depopulation,” widely reported in the press and accepted as common sense, is qualified by some of the academic literature on the city’s urbanism. A study by the School of Civil Engineering, Architecture, and Urban Planning (FECFAU) of State University of Campinas (Unicamp) argues that the downtown area has never ceased to be densely populated and used as a place for transit and shopping, and that what actually occurred was a change in the social composition of its visitors, with middle and upper-class activities and demographics shifting to other areas of the city, rather than a literal “hollowing out” in the strict sense of the term.

=== Revitalization policies ===
Since at least 2001, successive municipal governments have announced revitalization plans for the downtown area, with results that local business leaders have so far considered limited. In 2022, Complementary Law No. 395, signed into law by Mayor Dário Saadi (Republicanos), established tax and urban planning incentives, including a property tax (IPTU) exemption for up to six years, for the rehabilitation of properties in the downtown area, allowing for the conversion of commercial properties into residential ones and vice versa; the deadline for participation was extended until 2028.

In the 2025–2026 biennium, City Hall presented civil society organizations with a new Central Area Redevelopment Plan (PRAC), dubbed “Nosso Centro,” which calls for more flexible building regulations around historic landmarks, raising the height limit from six to eleven meters in three zones, an exemption from the neighborhood impact study for new developments, and measures to attract new residents to the region. In early 2026, at least ten retrofit projects were in various stages of implementation under the program.

== Neighborhoods in downtown ==
Because Campinas lacks precise, legally defined neighborhood boundaries, there are neighborhoods that are unknown to the general public due to their small size, such as Vila Lídia (this is the area between the railroad tracks, with the Ponte Preta neighborhood on the other side, Francisco Glicério, and the Waldemar Paschoal Expressway).

== See also ==
- Centro (Madrid)
- List of municipalities in São Paulo
- Interior of São Paulo
