= Paulista railway =

The Paulista railway may refer to:

- Companhia Paulista de Estradas de Ferro (CPEF), a historic Brazilian railroad company (1868–1971)
  - Ferrovia Paulista S/A (FEPASA), the company created to operate the assets of CPEF after nationalization (1971–1998)
- Companhia Paulista de Trens Metropolitanos (CPTM), a commuter rail system in São Paulo
