= Carlos Gomes Square =

Square established in 1880 in the city of Campinas, São Paulo, Brazil

Coordinates: 22°54′12.27″S 47°03′23.59″W

- Praça Carlos Gomes
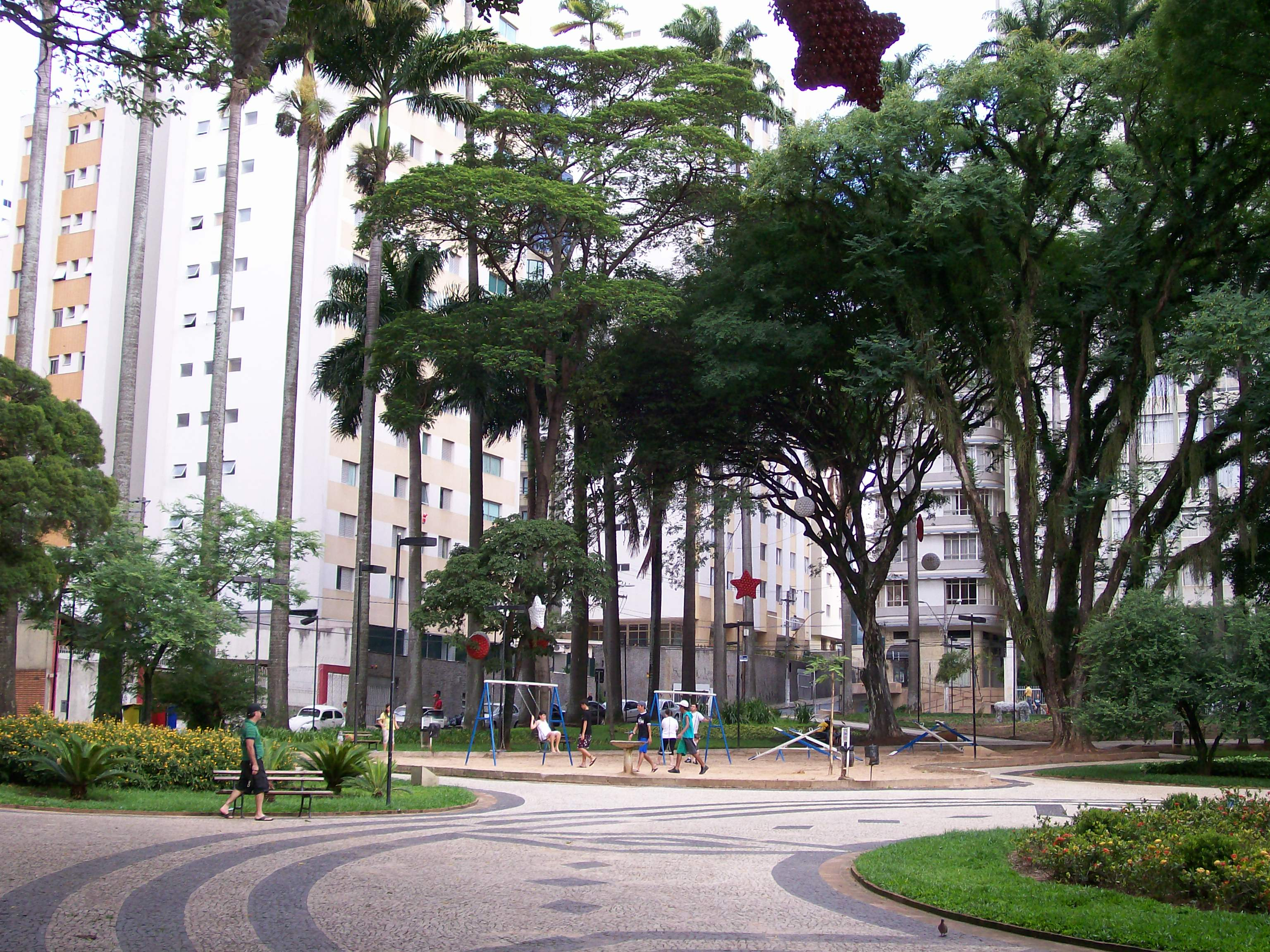
- Praça Carlos Gomes
- Interactive map of Carlos Gomes Square
- Type: Urban park
- Location: Campinas, São Paulo, Brazil
- Created: 1880
- Owner: Municipality of Campinas
- Administrator: Municipality of Campinas

Carlos Gomes Square is a guarden square founded in 1880 located in downtown in the interior of the state of São Paulo, bounded by Conceição Street (south), Irmã Serafina Street (west), Boaventura do Amaral Street (east), and General Osório Street (north).

== History ==
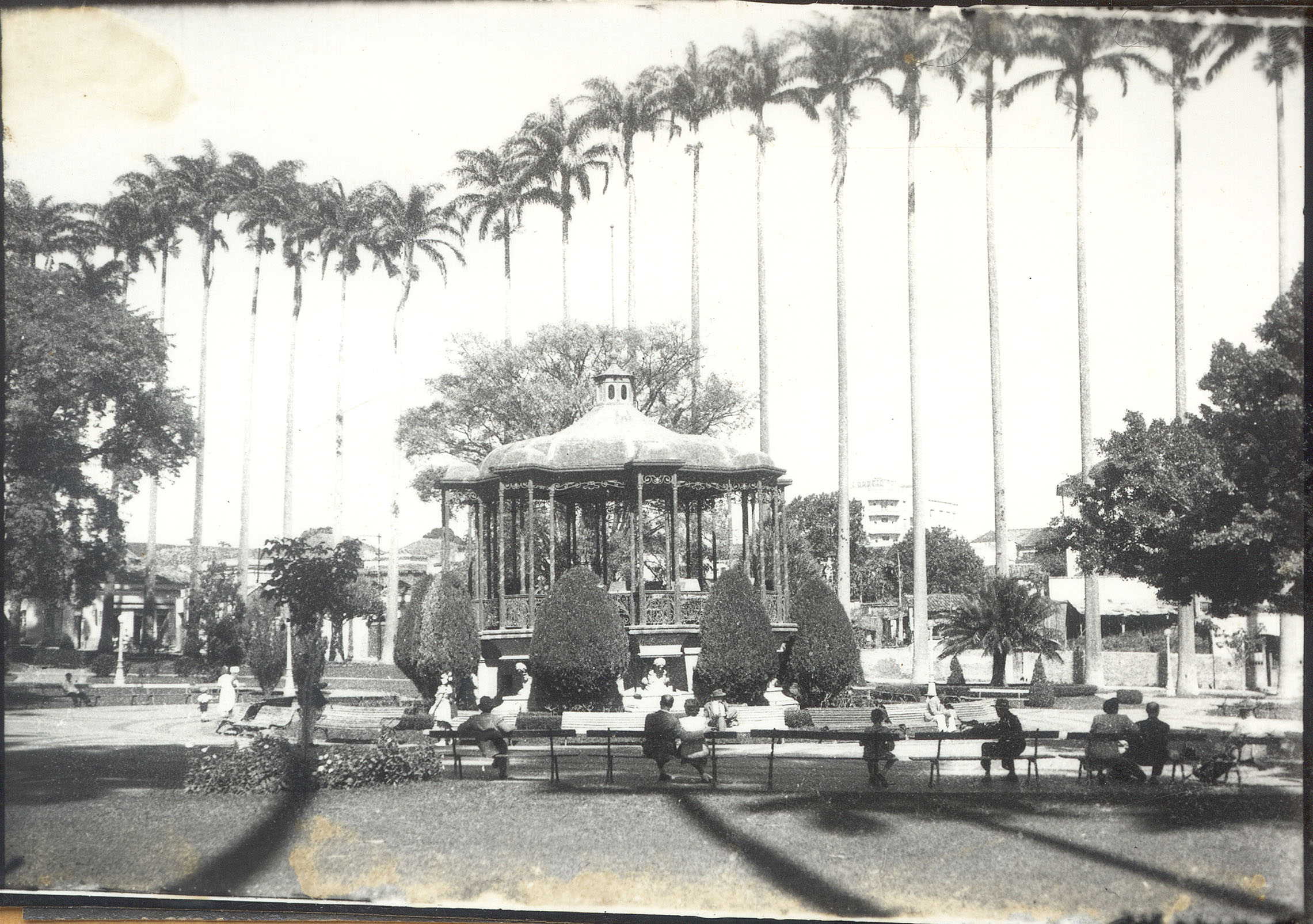
Carlos Gomes Square in the 1940s–1950s, courtesy of the collection of the State University of Campinas (Unicamp)

Founded in 1880, Carlos Gomes Square, located in the downtown of Campinas, a city in the interior of the state of São Paulo, was designed by architect Ramos de Azevedo and serves as a public tribute to composer Antônio Carlos Gomes while he was still alive, a practice that was quite unusual in Brazil. (Note: In Brazil, Law No. 6,454, dated October 24, 1977—signed during the administration of Ernesto Geisel, after the square honoring Antônio Carlos Gomes had been inaugurated—prohibits, throughout the entire country, the naming of any public facility after a living person. In 2025, Justice Luiz Fux of the Supreme Federal Court (STF) upheld the ruling in a case from Atibaia, in the interior of São Paulo, where Flávio Callegari, a former mayor who is still alive, was to have an educational center named after him. The STF blocked the move based on the 1977 law.) In 1883, 100 imperial palm trees were purchased and planted around the square, most of which still stand today. In 1914, the square was leveled and landscaped, and a bandstand was added, which still stands there today.

In different corners of the square, there are two monuments: one dedicated to the jurist Ruy Barbosa and another dedicated to Tomás Alves, a doctor from Campinas who played a key role in combating the 1889 yellow fever epidemic. On two occasions, in 2010 and 2013, the 30-kilogram bronze bust honoring Dr. Thomaz Alves was stolen by criminals. Since then, the bust has been missing from the square. From the square, you can see the Itatiaia Building, the only project designed by Oscar Niemeyer architect in Campinas.

Beer festival at Carlos Gomes Square in 2026.

Since the completion of the construction work, the square has hosted performances by popular bands, making it a popular gathering place for local families at the time. Today, the square hosts various markets, provides services for the homeless, and serves as a venue for a variety of events.

== Listing ==
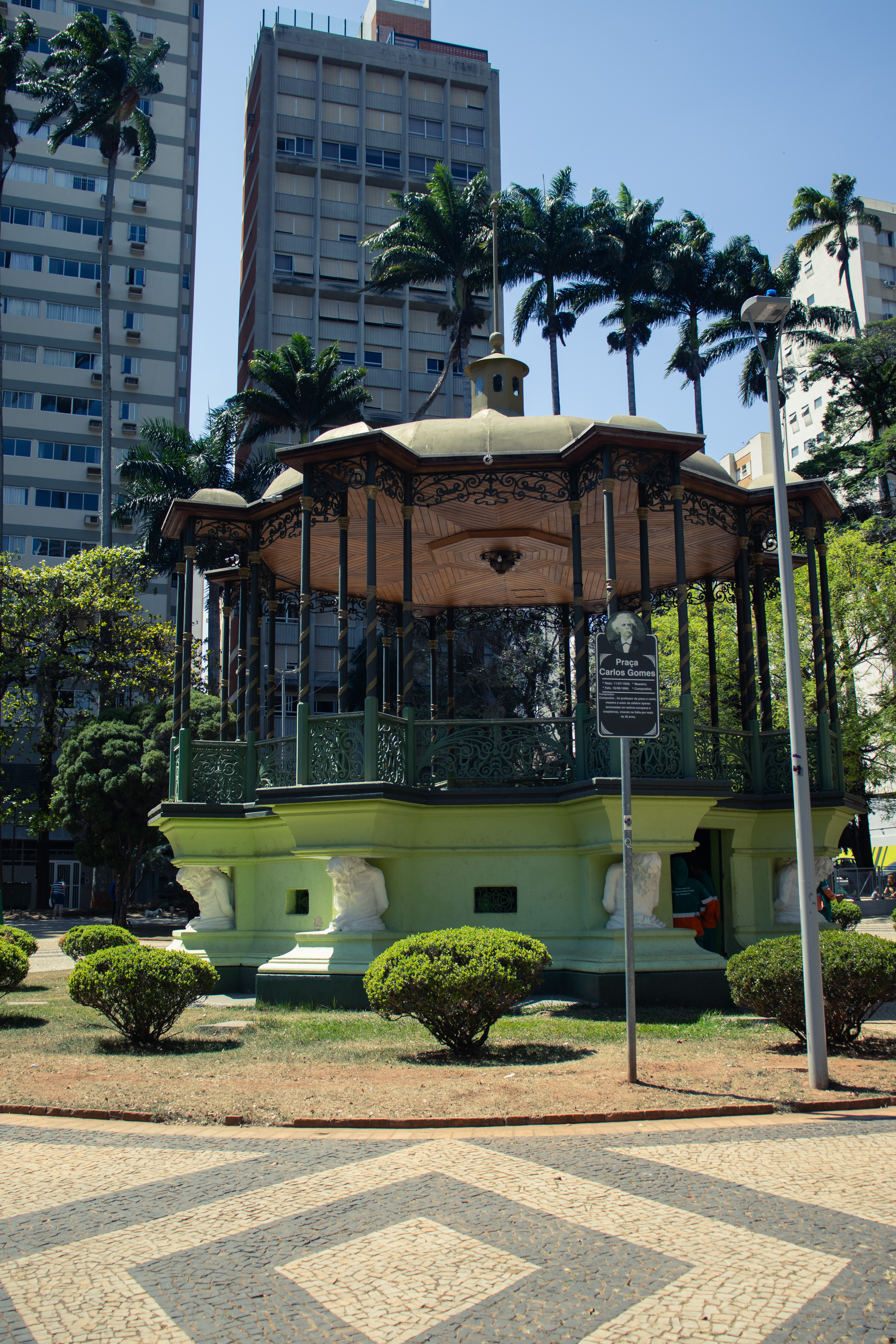
Bandstand at Carlos Gomes Square

In 2015, the bandstand in the square began the process of being designated a historic landmark, in conjunction with the Campinas Council for the Defense of Cultural Heritage (CONDEPACC). It was manufactured by Mac Hardy Company, one of the first companies in the industry, located in the city of Campinas and established in 1913.

== In popular culture ==
The square was chosen as one of the filming locations for the first phase of A Lei do Amor, Rede Globo’s 9 p.m. soap opera. The square was chosen because of its bandstand and green space.
