= Flor Et =

Brazilian rock band

- Origin: Porto Alegre, Rio Grande do Sul, Brazil
- Genres: Alternative rock; MPB
- Years active: 2016–present
- Label: Independent
- Members: Ada Bellatrix; Mário Ferreira; Daniel Ribeiro; Diego Vogt; Rafael Zanette
- Website: www.floretoficial.com

Flor Et is a Brazilian rock and Brazilian music band formed in 2016 in Porto Alegre and currently based in São Paulo. Initially a duo (Ada Bellatrix on vocals/saxophone and Mário Ferreira on acoustic guitar), the group was soon joined by Daniel Ribeiro on the bass and Rafael Zanette on the drums and finally by Diego Vogt on the keyboards three years later. Together, they have released two albums Futurotrópica in 2022 and Brazapunk in 2025.

== History ==
Flor Et was formed in 2016 in Porto Alegre, and moved to São Paulo in June 2024. Initially, they were a voice, saxophone and acoustic guitar duo named "A Flor e o ET" (The Floer and the ET), solely with Ada Bellatrix (vocals/sax) and Mário Ferreira (acoustic guitar). The name "Flor Et" symbolizes "the fusion of organic beings transformed by external influences".

Soon, they wanted to expand their sound and invited Rafael Zanette (drums) and Daniel Ribeiro (bass), with keyboardist Diego Vogt (which also does PR for the band) also joining three years later.

Their first release was an EP recorded in a rush so they could fetch some dates to perform live, but it is no longer available on streaming platforms. Their first full-length album, Futurotrópica, came in 2022, combining songs written across their first six years together. Bellatrix was nominated for the Açorianos Music Award in the category "Best Singer" for her performance on "Malabares".

On 25 July 2025, they released the single "O Corre", the first off their second album Brazapunk, which was produced by Alexandre Birck and Barral Lima. A video for the song was released later, on August 6. The album was released on 19 September 2025, after two more singles: "QSF", inspired by the 8 January Brasília attacks; and "Cansada". Brazapunk proposes a fusion between punk, progressive rock and tropicalism.

On 14 September, they performed at the "Elas no Comando" festival at Espaço Cultura in Campinas alongside As Mercenárias, Entre Pontos, Boca Podre and Claudiah. In February 2026, part of a live presentation of Brazapunk was made available on YouTube, in partnership with Tannus Estúdio. In March 2026, they performed at the 'O Som das Mina' Rock Festival, celebrating Women's Minth, alongside Lorena Tá Com Fome, Insones, Versaille Waltz, Ratas Rabiosas and Trassas, in Santo André.

== Musical style ==
In an interview with Baixo Centro, the band described their sound as a mixture of Brazilian music, electronic music, heavy metal, rap, hardcore and samba. They have also been described as an alternative rock groups with elements of punk, progressive rock and tropicalism.

In a 2025 interview with EBC Radios, Ferreira commented that, in the first album, the group approached their references in a more direct way, while in the second disc they would mix them in a more experimental way.

Their lyrics deal with social, political, existential and Brazilian daily life topics.

== Members ==
Per Baixo Centro, Mad Sound:

- Ada Bellatrix – vocals, saxophone (2016–present)
- Mário Ferreira – guitar, backing vocals (2016–present)
- Daniel Ribeiro – bass, backing vocals (2016–present)
- Diego Vogt – keyboards, backing vocals (2019–present)
- Rafael Zanette – drums (2016–present)

== Discography ==
=== EPs ===
- Unknown title (201?)

=== Albums ===
- Futurotrópica (2022)
- Brazapunk (2025)

=== Singles ===
- "O Corre" (2025)
- "QSF" (2025)
- "Cansada" (2025)
