= Cambuí, Campinas =

Neighborhood of Campinas in São Paulo, Brazil

Cambuí
- Neighborhood
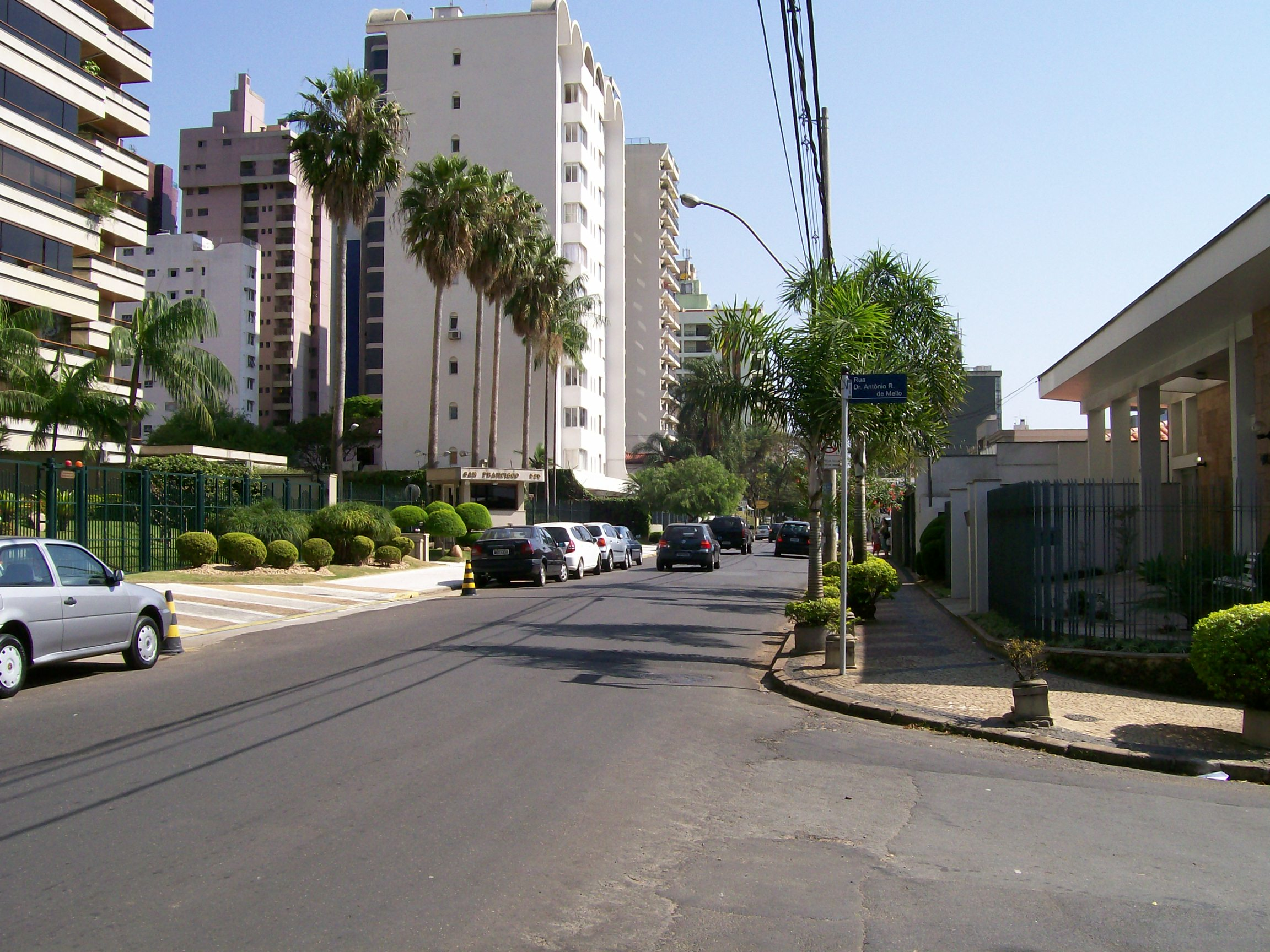
- Maria Monteiro Street is one of the main streets in Cambuí
- Interactive map of Cambuí
- Country: Brazil
- State: São Paulo
- Municipality: Campinas
- Administrative region: Central Zone

Population
  - Total: 47,700
- Households: 468

Cambuí is an upscale neighborhood in the Central Zone of the municipality of Campinas, in the state of São Paulo, Brazil. It stretches from the Via Norte-Sul region to the Centro de Convivência Cultural de Campinas. The neighborhood has a very complete infrastructure, with markets, stores, restaurants, bars, hotels, clubs, theaters, schools, etc.

Cambuí also has one of the highest per capita incomes in the city. Some of the most expensive properties in Campinas are located here. The streets in this neighborhood, such as Avenida Júlio de Mesquita, are more tree-lined than those in other neighborhoods in Campinas.

It is considered one of the most traditional neighborhoods with the best infrastructure in Campinas, containing the region with the most expensive square meter in the interior of São Paulo, around Via Norte-Sul. However, it is surpassed by some neighborhoods in Campinas in terms of average price per square meter.

== History ==
The history of Cambuí begins with the history of Campinas itself. The place where Praça 15 de Novembro (formerly Largo de Santa Cruz) is located today was one of three open fields (or small fields, or meadows) from which the urban center of Campinas was formed in the 18th century. One of the paths connecting two of these fields (the future Largo de Santa Cruz and the place where the São Paulo would later be built) ran roughly where Coronel Quirino Street is today. It was full of bushes called "Cambuís", which became a reference for the population, who began to call the region “cambuizal”.

For much of the 19th century, the region served as a home for Campinas' marginalized population: former slaves and prostitutes, who lived in slums and undervalued spaces. At the same time, Largo de Santa Cruz was home to the pillory, the gallows, trading houses, potteries, warehouses, among other services available to the tropeiros who traveled the roads between São Paulo and Goiás. This situation changed radically with the arrival of the Paulista and Mogiana railroads in the 1870s, when the local elite and those from other neighboring municipalities began to settle in the few streets of the neighborhood, in small farms. The 20th century dawned with Cambuí taking on a new appearance: a neighborhood of stately farms. In the following decades, the neighborhood gained several mansions and, after the 1950s and 1960s, underwent a rapid process of verticalization, in which, without losing its characteristics as an upscale neighborhood, it went from being a neighborhood of mansions to a neighborhood of buildings, most of them of high and very high standard.

=== In popular culture ===
In 2011, in an online conversation with Universo Online portal, Brazilian cartoonist Maurício de Sousa revealed that the fictional neighborhood of Limoeiro, where the stories of Monica and Friends take place, was inspired by the neighborhood of Cambuí, where the cartoonist lived for several years.

In 2022, the neighborhood was used as part of the setting for the series Todas as Garotas em Mim, broadcast by TV Record. In 2024, the neighborhood was used as part of the filming of the movie Evidências do Amor, starring Fábio Porchat and Sandy.

=== Neighborhoods within Cambuí ===
Due to the fact that Campinas does not have legal boundaries and needs neighborhoods, there are neighborhoods that are unknown to the general population because of their small size:

1. Dae (a little north of Vila Estanislau);
2. Jardim Novo Cambuí (at the junction of the neighborhoods Taquaral, Jardim Bela Vista, and Chácara da Barra);
3. Vila Estanislau (a small neighborhood located at the intersection of Orozimbo Maia Avenue and Via Norte-Sul);

== Gallery ==
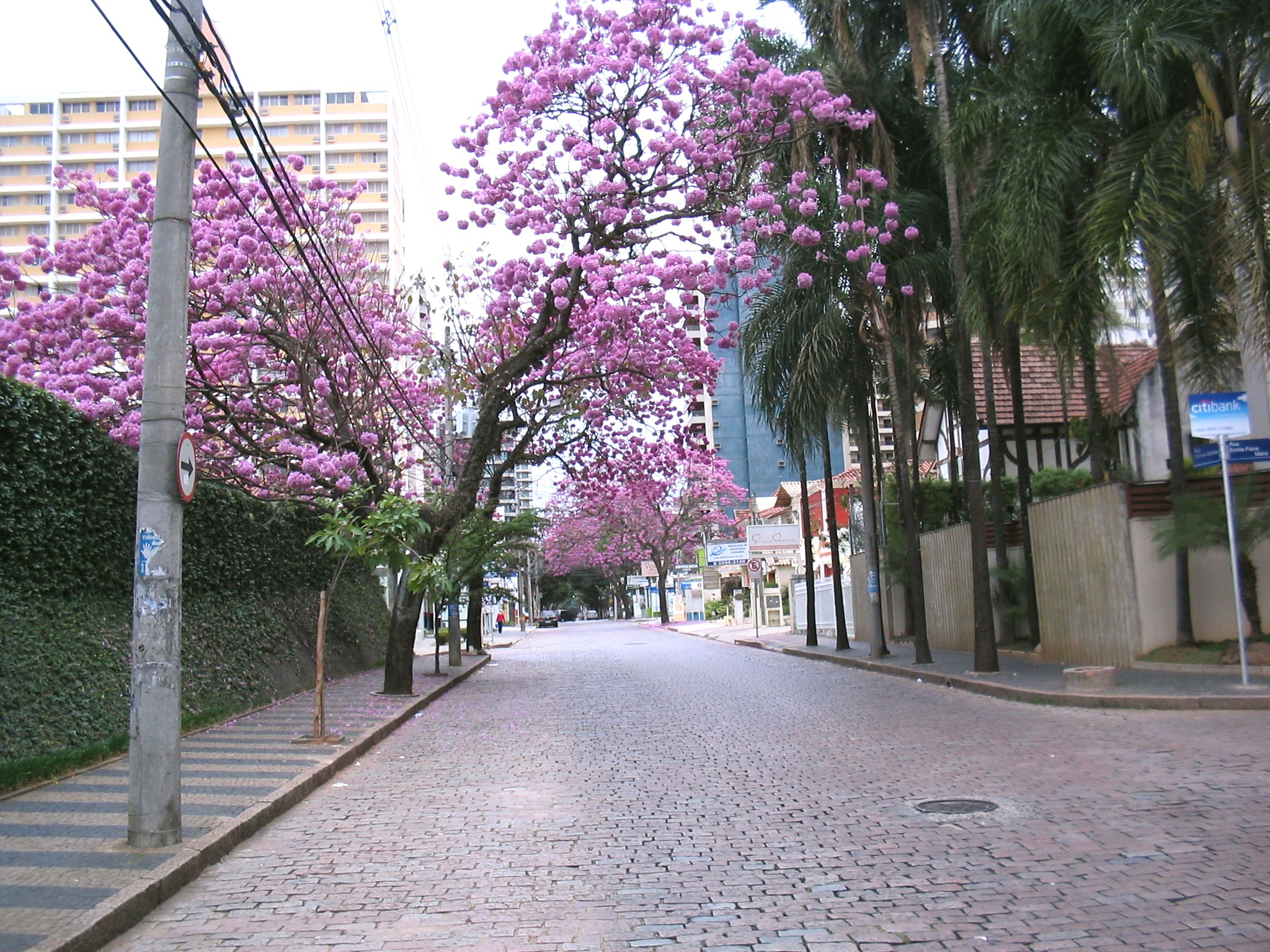
Lilac ipês in the neighborhood

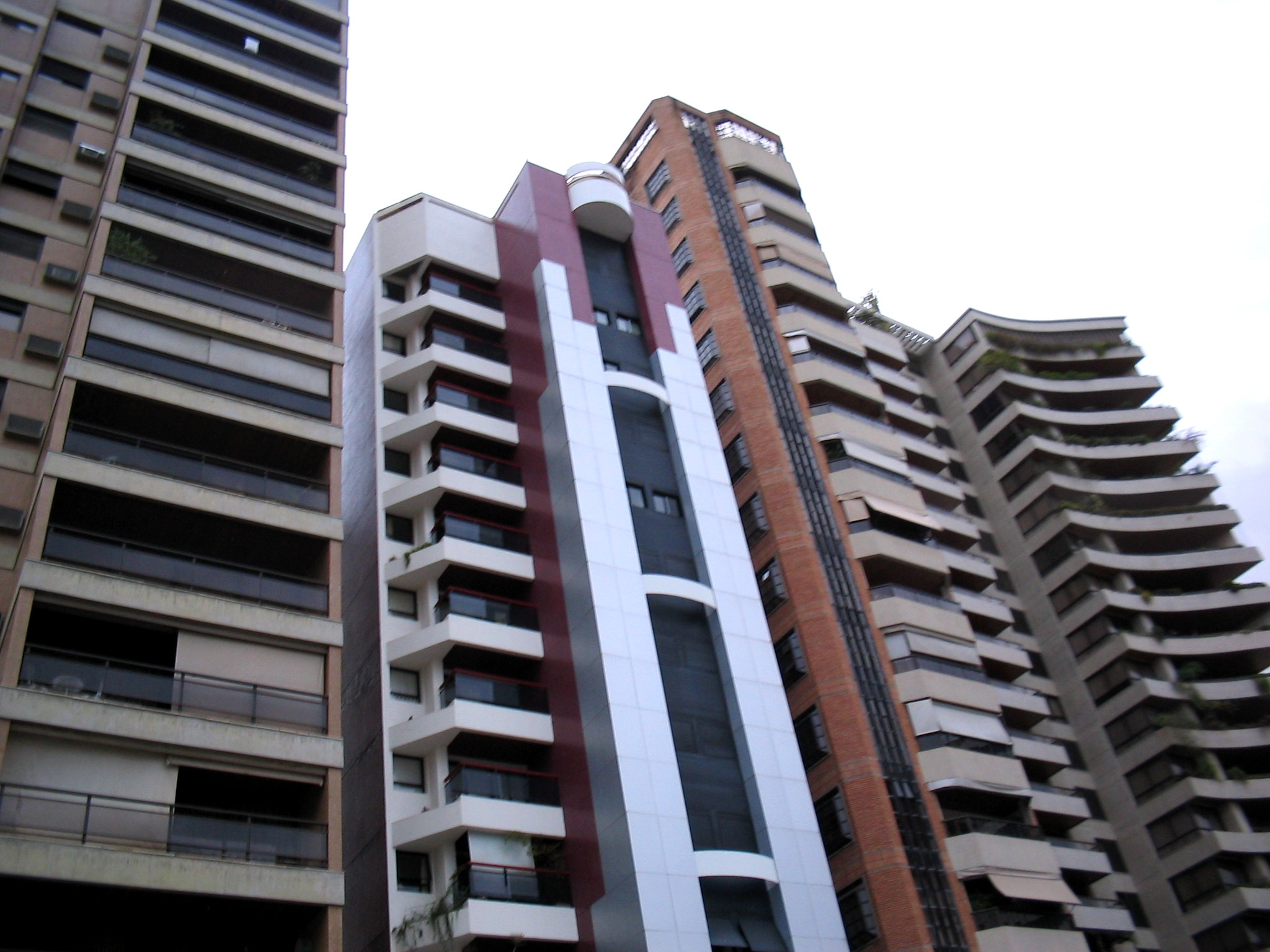
Aspects of the buildings in the neighborhood

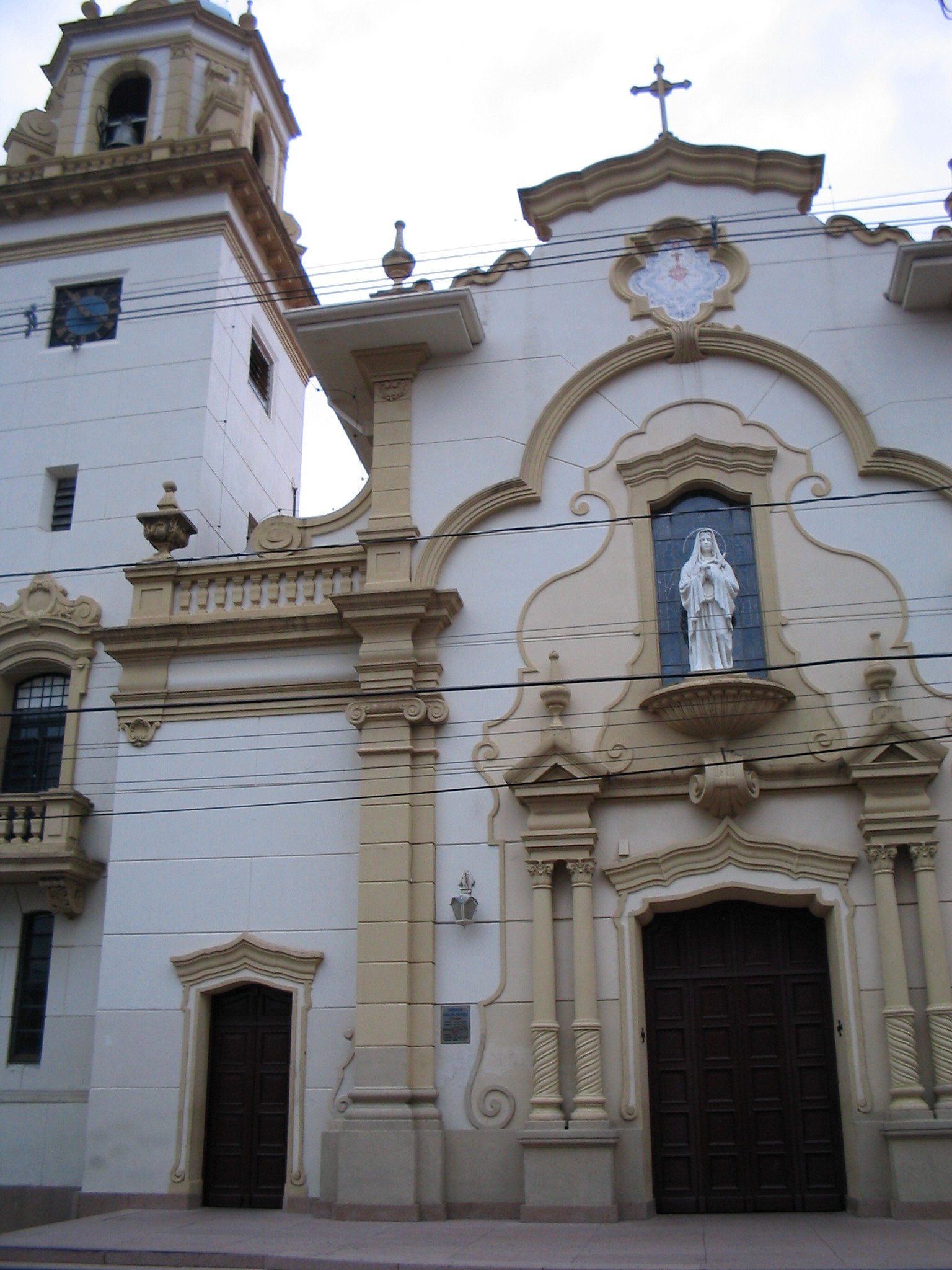
Catholic Church

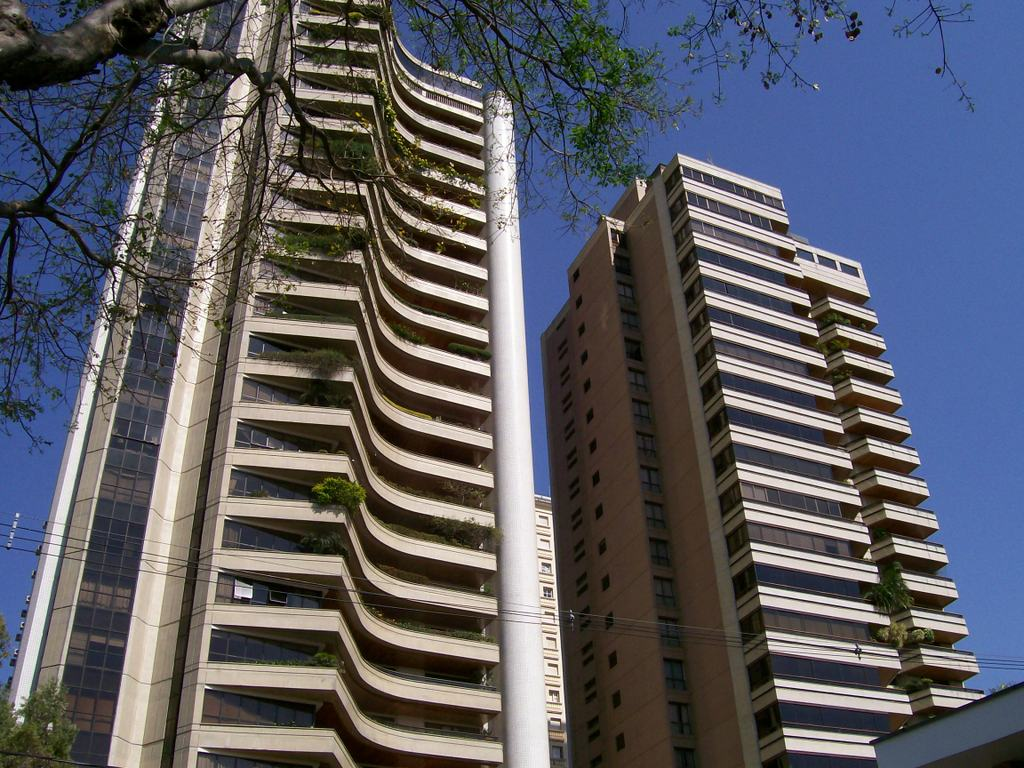
Aspects of the buildings in the neighborhood

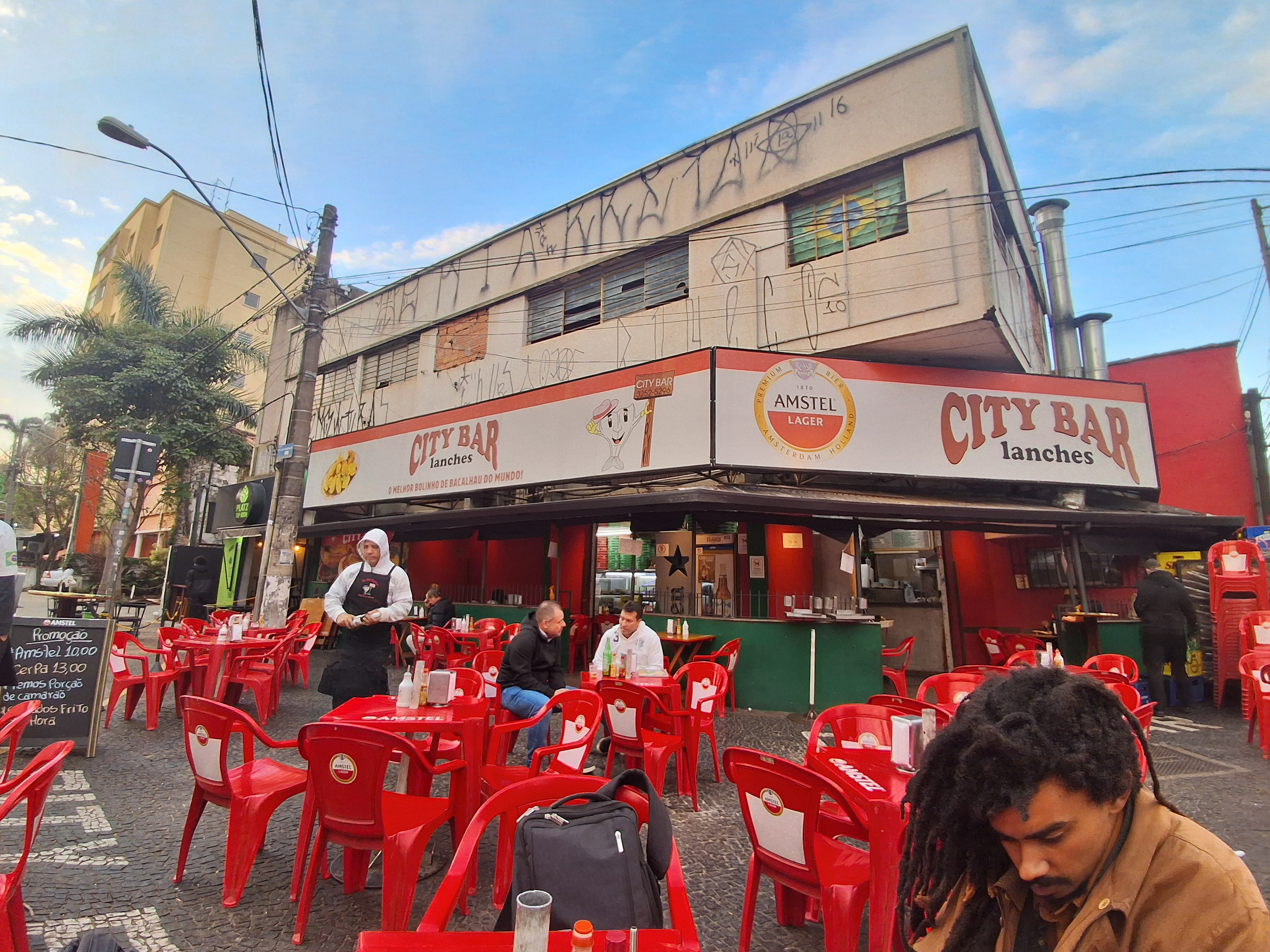
City Bar, a traditional neighborhood bar.
