= Itatiaia Building =

- Edifício Itatiaia
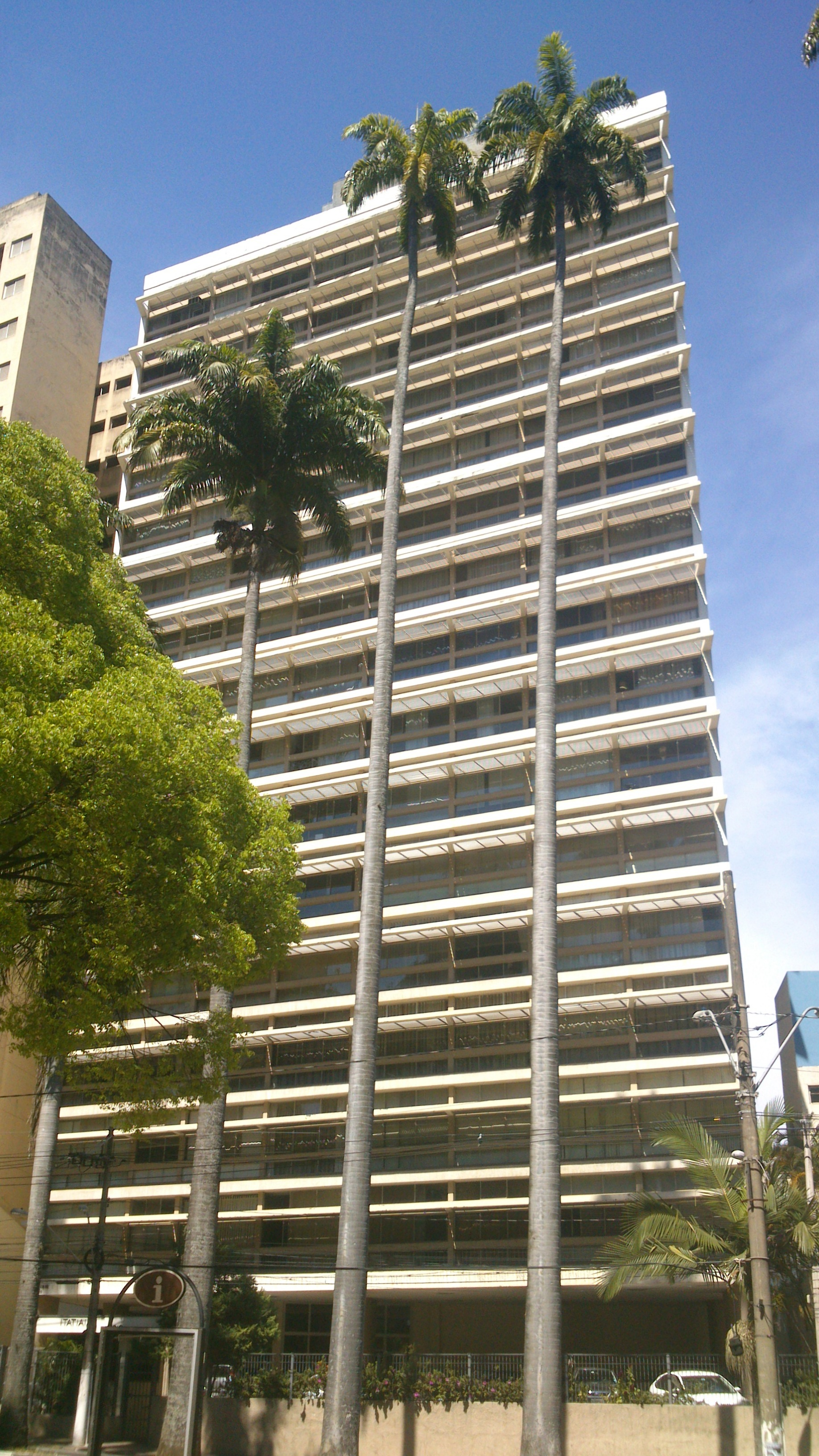
- Itatiaia Building, Campinas

- Location within Brazil

General information
- Architectural style: Modernist
- Location: Rua Irmã Serafina, 919 - Centro, Campinas - SP- CEP 13015-201, Campinas, São Paulo, Brazil
- Coordinates: 22°54′13.71″S 47°03′26.15″W
- Groundbreaking: 1953
- Completed: 1957

Height
- Height: 49 metres (161 ft)

Technical details
- Floor count: 15
- Floor area: 11,153.42 square metres (120,054.4 ft^{2})
- Lifts/elevators: 3
- Grounds: 1,569.8 square metres (16,897 ft^{2})

Design and construction
- Architect: Oscar Niemeyer
- Engineer: Werner Müller

The Itatiaia Building (Portuguese: Edifício Itatiaia) is an apartment building in the Centro district of Campinas, São Paulo, Brazil. It was designed by the architect Oscar Niemeyer (1907-2012) in 1953 and completed in 1957. It was the only residential tower in Campinas until the early 1960s, and was the first Modernist building in the city.

It occupies 1,569.8 square metres (16,897 ft^{2}) on a trapezoid-shaped plot of land on Irmã Serafina Avenue. It is often compared to another of building of the period, the Copan Building (Edifício Copan) in São Paulo.
