= Companhia Paulista de Estradas de Ferro =

Brazilian railway company active 1872–1971

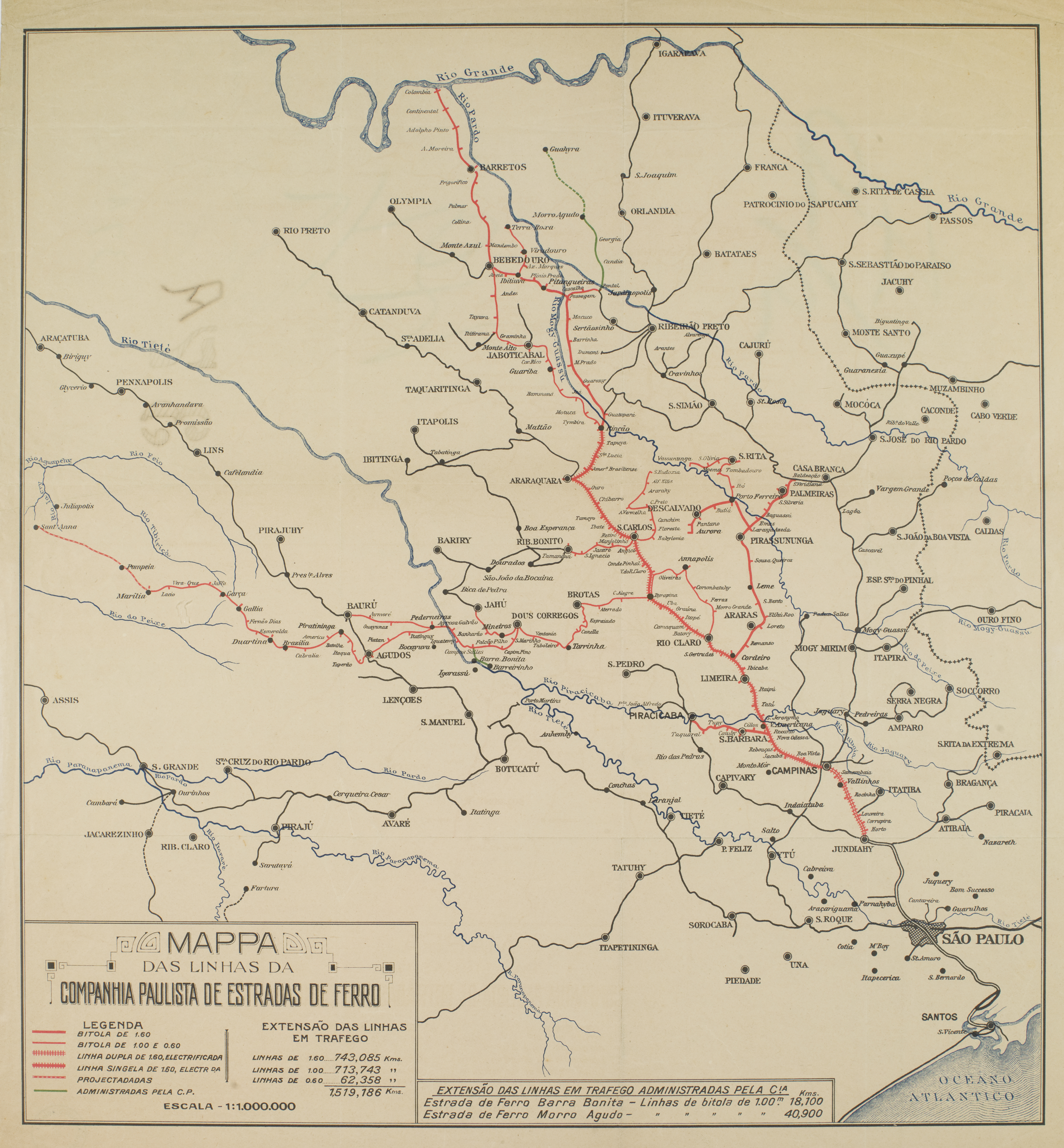
- Map of the lines of Companhia Paulista de Estradas de Ferro c. 1930/1931 (from the archive of the Museu Paulista).

Overview
- Headquarters: Jundiaí (operational); São Paulo (administractive)
- Reporting mark: CP, CPEF
- Locale: São Paulo, Brazil
- Dates of operation: 30 January 1868–28 October 1971
- Predecessor: The Rio Claro São Paulo Railway Company
- Successor: FEPASA

Technical
- Track gauge: 1,600 mm (5 ft 3 in); 1,000 mm (3 ft 3 3/8 in)
- Length: 1,536 km (954 mi)

Companhia Paulista de Estradas de Ferro (also called Companhia Paulista de Vias Férreas and Fluviais) was a Brazilian railway company located in the state of São Paulo. It was known for its high standard of quality in customer service.

It remained in activity from August 1872 until October 1971, when it was extinguished and incorporated into FEPASA - Ferrovia Paulista S/A.

== History ==
=== Jundiaí–Rio Claro ===
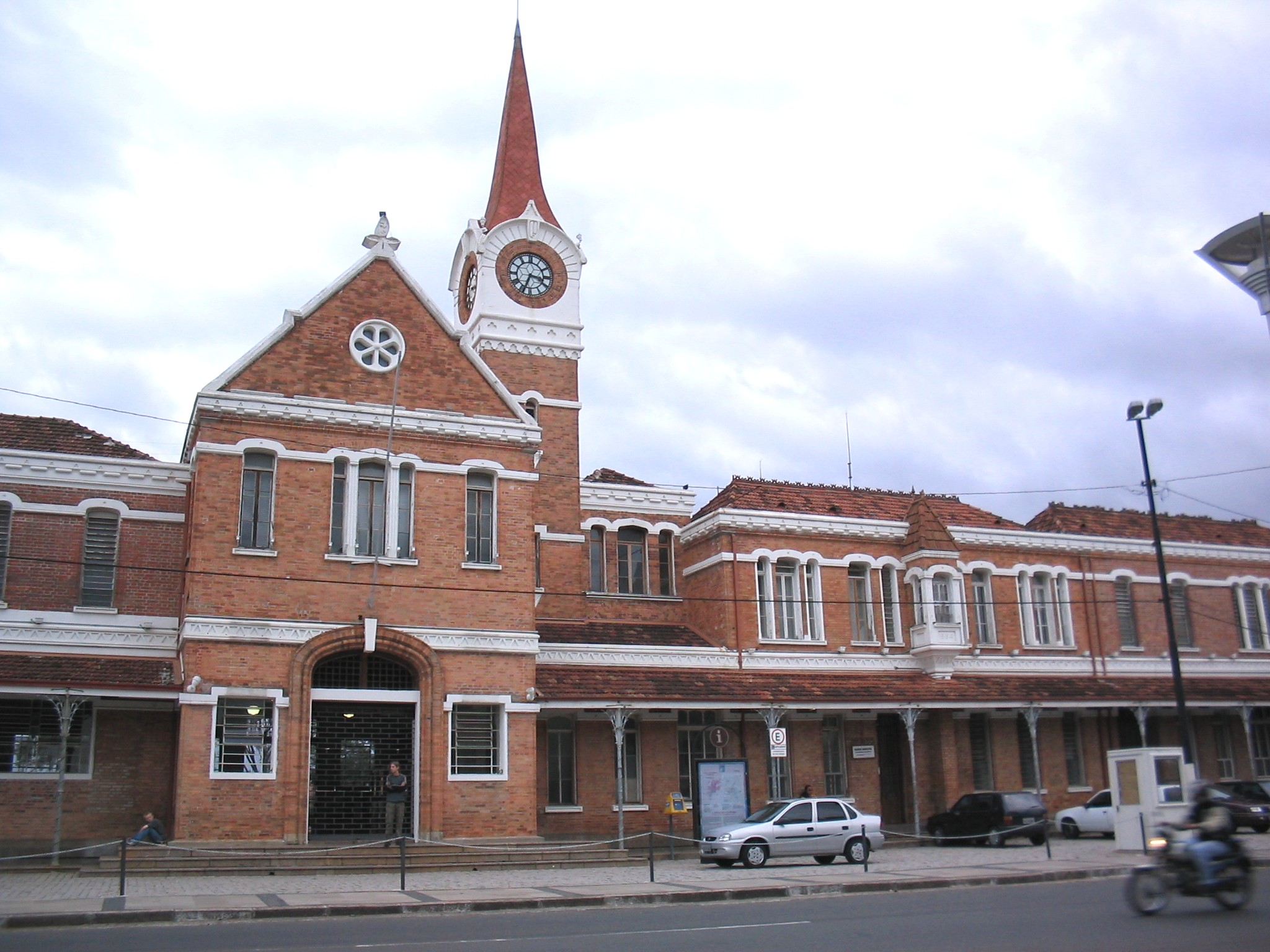
The Campinas Station, one of the most important of the Paulista Company

The railway was idealized, in 1864, by a group of farmers, traders and capitalists who needed a means of draining the coffee grown in the interior of the state of São Paulo. They intended that São Paulo Railway, "Ingleza" or "Santos–Jundiaí", would take their rails to São João do Rio Claro (current Rio Claro), since it held the concession for this purpose.

The decision to found the company came after the São Paulo Railway declared that it would not be possible to extend the railway further, not even to the city of Campinas, due to the losses with the Paraguayan War. The tracks of the São Paulo Railway only reached Jundiaí. In this city began to build the railways of the company towards the interior of São Paulo.

The president of the province of São Paulo at the time, Saldanha Marinho, had a fundamental role in the founding of the company in 1868, bringing together in the same ideal the capitalists and farmers who were fighting for political interests at that time.

Companhia Paulista was then founded on 30 January 1868, under the presidency of Clemente Falcão de Sousa Filho, but construction work on the line began more than a year after that date, after the approval of the statutes of Companhia Paulista by Imperial Government. On 11 August 1872, with a gauge of 1,600 mm (63 in), the first section was opened, between Jundiaí and Campinas.

=== Rio Claro–São Carlos ===
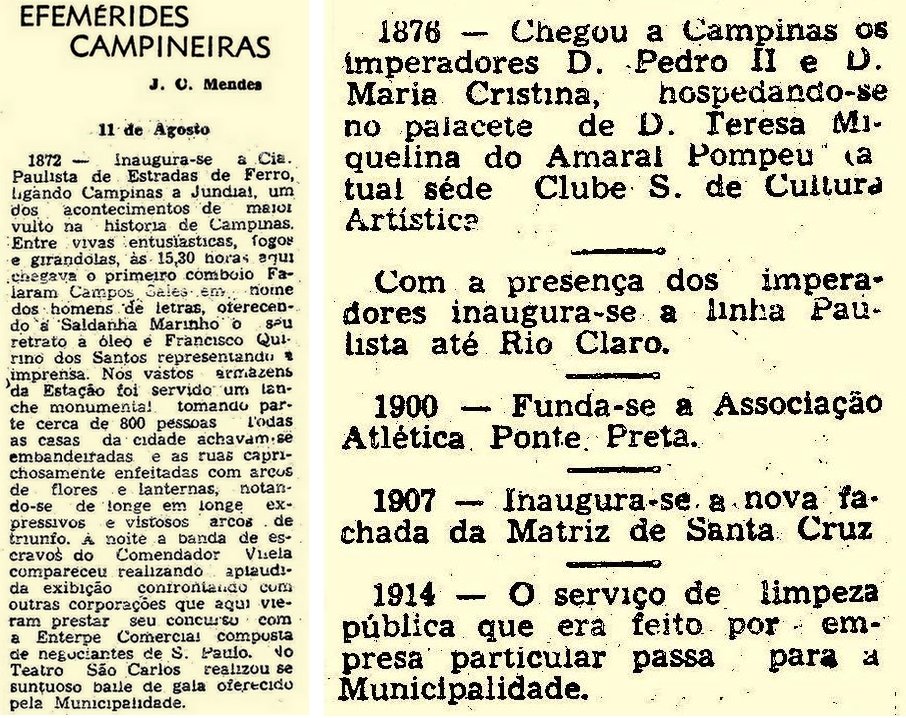
Ephemeris of the inauguration of the Companhia Paulista de Estradas de Ferro in 1872 and of the traditional Ponte Preta football club in 1900.

Its tracks advanced inland, reaching Rio Claro in 1875 and Descalvado in 1876. However, its growth was put in check when Paulista did not accept to bend to political interests that required the extension of São Carlos to pass through the Morro Pellado (current Itirapina) to attend the influential farmers, based in neighboring Itaqueri da Serra and also in the so-called "Itaqueri de Baixo".

Likewise, due to political criteria, in the management of Laurindo Abelardo de Brito as president of the province of São Paulo, Paulista was prevented from extending its lines to Ribeirão Preto, which ended up in Descalvado.

This extension was granted to the Companhia Mogiana, in an evident "breach" of its original layout. Then, the Companhia Rio Claro was founded, which took the extension concession to São Carlos and Araraquara, with an extension to Jaú and Bauru departing from Itirapina. by the engineer Antonio Francisco de Paula Souza.

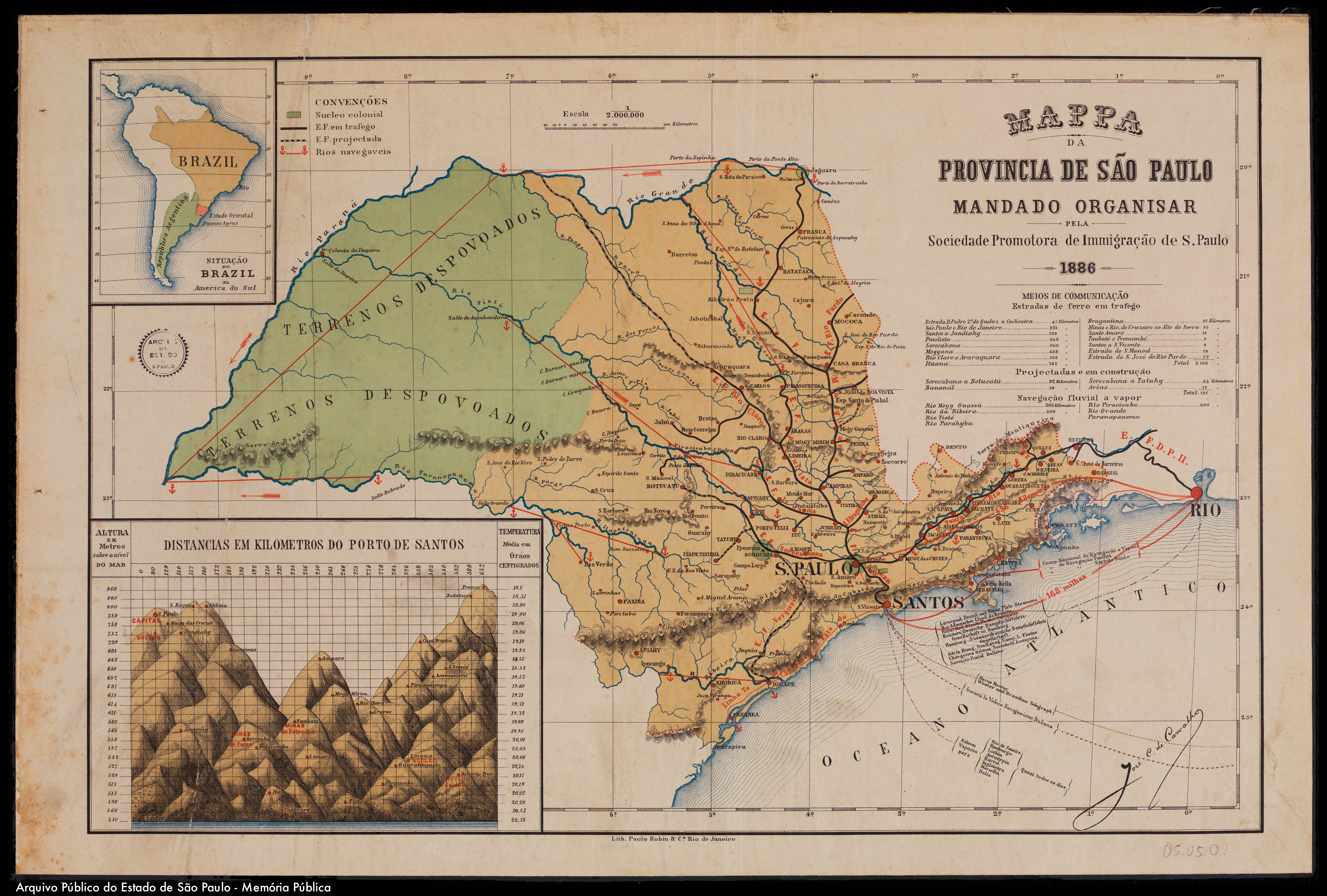
Map of the São Paulo State railway lines in 1886

Some years later, it was proposed by the Companhia Rio Claro that belonged to the Count of Pinhal and to the Major Benedito Antonio da Silva, the merger of Rio Claro and Paulista, however, the proposed bases for such a transaction were not accepted by Paulista, through its then-president Fidêncio Nepomuceno Prates, despite the recommendation of members of its technical staff who inspected the facilities of Companhia Rio Claro, for the merger to take place.

Soon after, Companhia Rio Claro was sold to "The Rio Claro São Paulo Railway Company", headquartered in London, which provided the line with several improvements and extensions.

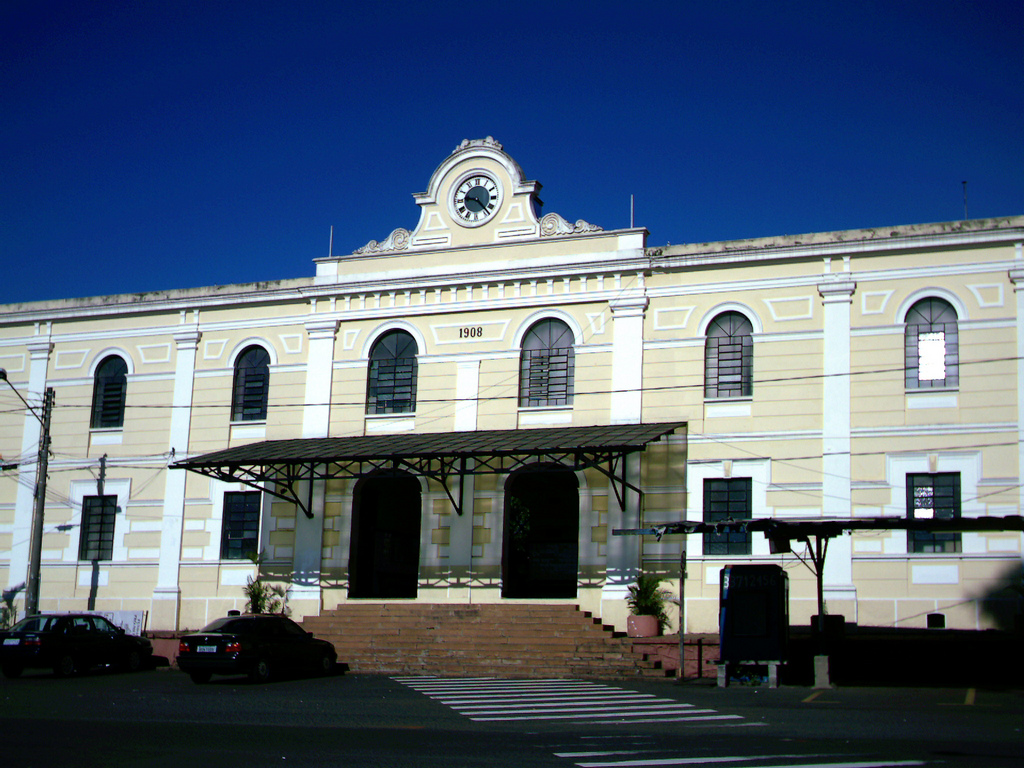
The São Carlos Station, one of the most important of the Companhia Paulista.

Due to rumors of a possible merger of "The Rio Claro" with Mogiana, the board of directors of Paulista, through its president Antônio da Silva Prado authorized the purchase of "The Rio Claro" in the year of 1892, for the sum of 2,775,000 pounds, with a loan of £2,750,000 obtained in London and £25,000 at the time of purchase.

=== Expansion ===
In 1891, Paulista acquired two small 0.60m gauge railways that approached Rio Claro and Mogiana: Companhia Descalvadense and Companhia Ramal Ferreo de Santa Rita.

From there, Paulista extended its inland lines, becoming tributaries of a sector of the state limited between the Peixe and Mojiguaçu rivers, also having tributaries such as Companhia Douradense, Noroeste do Brasil, Estrada de Ferro Araraquara, São Paulo-Goiás, Mogiana, Funilense and Ramal Férreo Campineiro.

Upon receiving the lines from the Rio Claro Railway on April 1, 1892, Companhia Paulista divided its network into two sections: Paulista, which had 1.6m gauge lines and two small 0.6m gauge lines, and Rio Claro, with all the metre-gauge lines.

After that, Paulista developed and much, the infrastructure received from the English, expanding and improving the Stations, such as those in Rio Claro (which was completely rebuilt, with large garages) and São Carlos (which had many expansions and the installation of metallic armor of its wide station) and the stone support of the permanent way, among other items of great importance.

The company has always lent support to its tax companies such as the Dourado, São Paulo-Goyaz/Pitangueiras, Jaboticabal, Morro Agudo, and Barra Bonita companies, going so far as to acquire, since the 1930s, shareholdings of those railways. One of them, Pitangueiras, which had previously been integrated by incorporation into São Paulo-Goyáz and later, near bankruptcy, organized under the name of Companhia Ferroviária São Paulo-Goyáz, sold in 1927 to Paulista, its Pitangueiras Section, so that the trunk line could use the layout of the original Pitangueiras, from Passagem to Ibitiuva and from there to Bebedouro, as the most suitable option for extending the 1,6m gauge from Rincão to Barretos and later to the Porto Cemitério (later Colômbia), on the banks of Rio Grande. Believing in the potential of the livestock industry in the north of the state, Paulista organized with third parties the Companhia Frigorífica e Pastoril (CFP), which was later transferred to foreign capital, originated by S.A. Frigorífico Anglo.

=== Modernization and efficiency ===
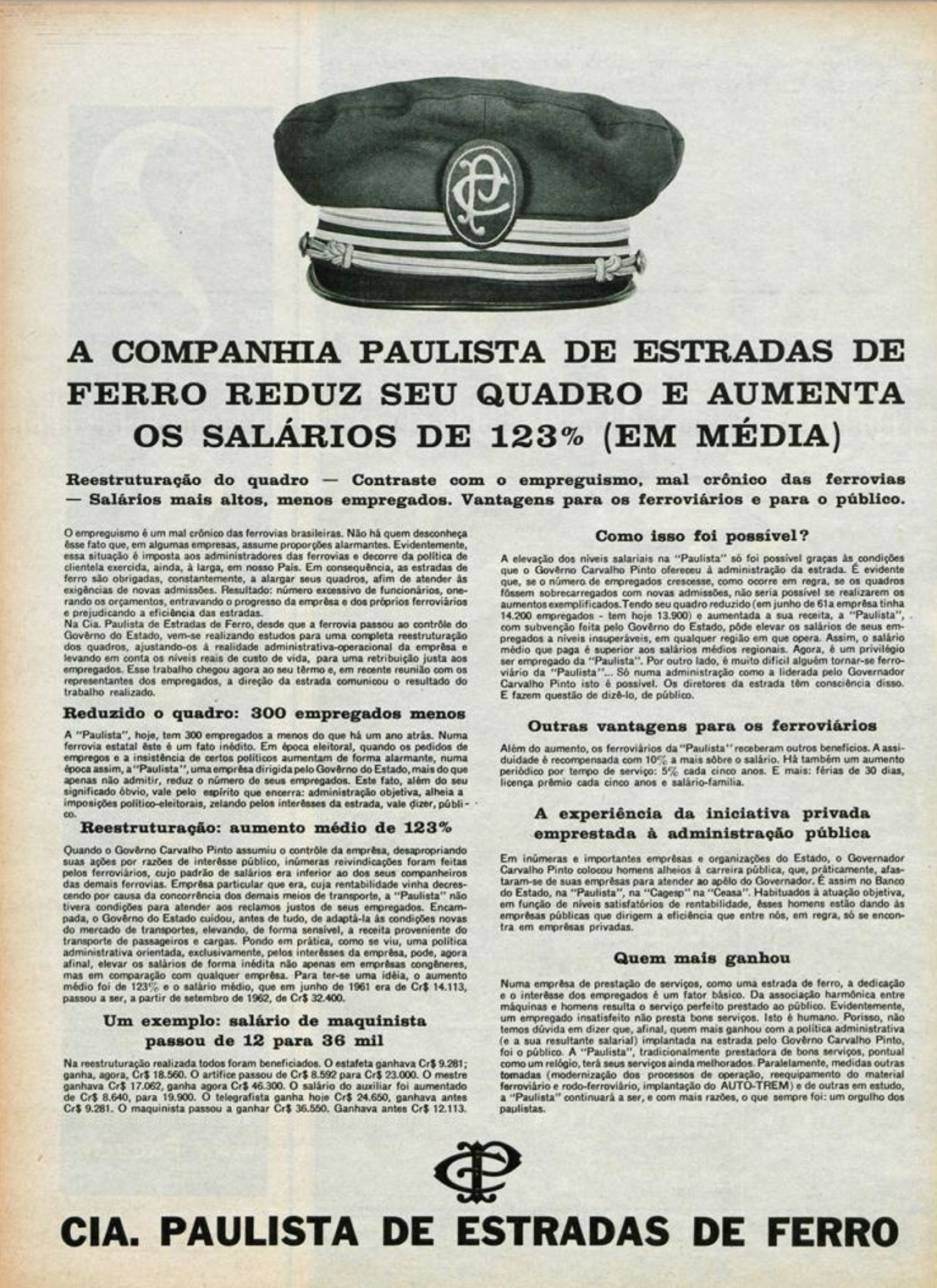
Compania Paulista's advertisement launched one year after its nationalization, 1962

Share of the Companhia Paulista de Estradas de Ferro S. A., issued 1. December 1927

Using in-depth studies by the engineer Francisco de Monlevade, Inspector General of the company, the latter began the electrification of the lines in 1920, at the voltage of 3 KVCC, extending the use of white coal on the line from Jundiaí to Campinas (1922) and from there to Rio Claro (1926). Aware of Monlevade's maxim that "if they did not electrify their lines, they would not distribute any more dividends", he extended this remarkable improvement from Rio Claro to Rincão (1928) and, in the Jaú branch, from Itirapina to Jaú (1941) and from there to Pederneiras (1947) and Bauru (1948). The limit of this advance was given between Bauru and Cabrália-Paulista in 1954, the year of the delivery of the widening of the gauge in the line from Bauru to Marília. It is worth mentioning that studies pointed to the extension of electrification to Tupã, even indicating that the Piracicaba and Descalvado branches would be electrified, reaching the latter, at least, to Pirassununga Station. The extension of electrification to Garça began but later abandoned, and the other steps were limited to studies.

Companhia Paulista was a pioneer in a series of initiatives in the Brazilian railroad field. It was the first railroad to electrify its lines, to use steel cars to transport passengers (and later build them in its workshops), to foster the creation of protected areas to obtain railroad ties and firewood (through it eucalyptus was introduced in Brazil), as well as other management initiatives previously unheard of in Brazil.

Its passenger trains became famous for the comfort they offered and the punctuality with which they operated. The "R" Train ("R" stands for "rápido", meaning "fast" in Portuguese) or "Blue Train", composed of three-class cars (Pullman, First, and Second Class) and a restaurant, became notorious and determined a standard of comfort not yet seen in Brazil, both in rail (almost extinct) and road transport.

=== Maintenance ===
Companhia Paulista had the Jundiaí workshops (dedicated to medium and heavy maintenance of steam, electric, and diesel-electric locomotives) and Rio Claro workshops (directed to the general maintenance of cars and wagons).

Throughout its five divisions, it also had locomotive depots (dedicated to light and medium maintenance of steam, electric, and diesel-electric locomotives), among them the ones in Jundiaí, Campinas, Rio Claro, São Carlos (demolished), Rincão and Bebedouro.

=== Trade union ===
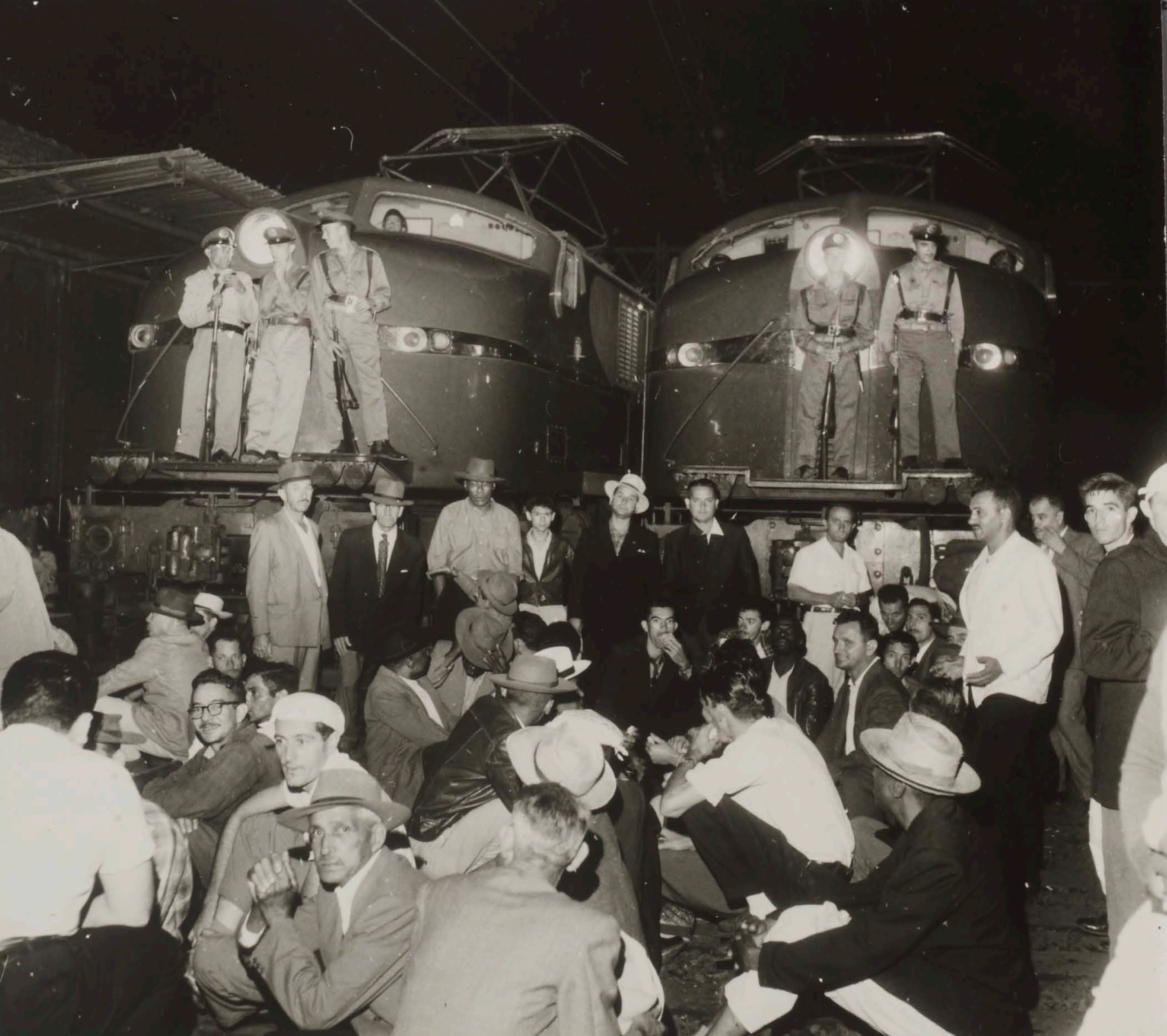
Companhia Paulista workers sit on the tracks in Jundiaí to prevent trains from running during the April 1959 strike. National Archives

The first railroad workers union was founded in the city of São Carlos in 1929, with the name "Sindicato dos Operários Ferroviários da Companhia Paulista de Estradas de Ferro", which later had its headquarters transferred to Campinas.

==== First strike in Brazil ====
The union played, however, a role in history long before that, with the first strike in Brazil held in May 1906, after the Labor Day rally at the Polytheama pavilion, which was supported by the weavers of the Fábrica São Bento and the students of the Largo São Francisco Law School, which was harshly repressed.

=== Decay ===
In 1961, during an economic crisis aggravated by a series of strikes, the company was nationalized. On November 10, 1971, Companhia Paulista de Estradas de Ferro was incorporated into the new state-owned FEPASA.

== Transport ==
=== Passengers ===
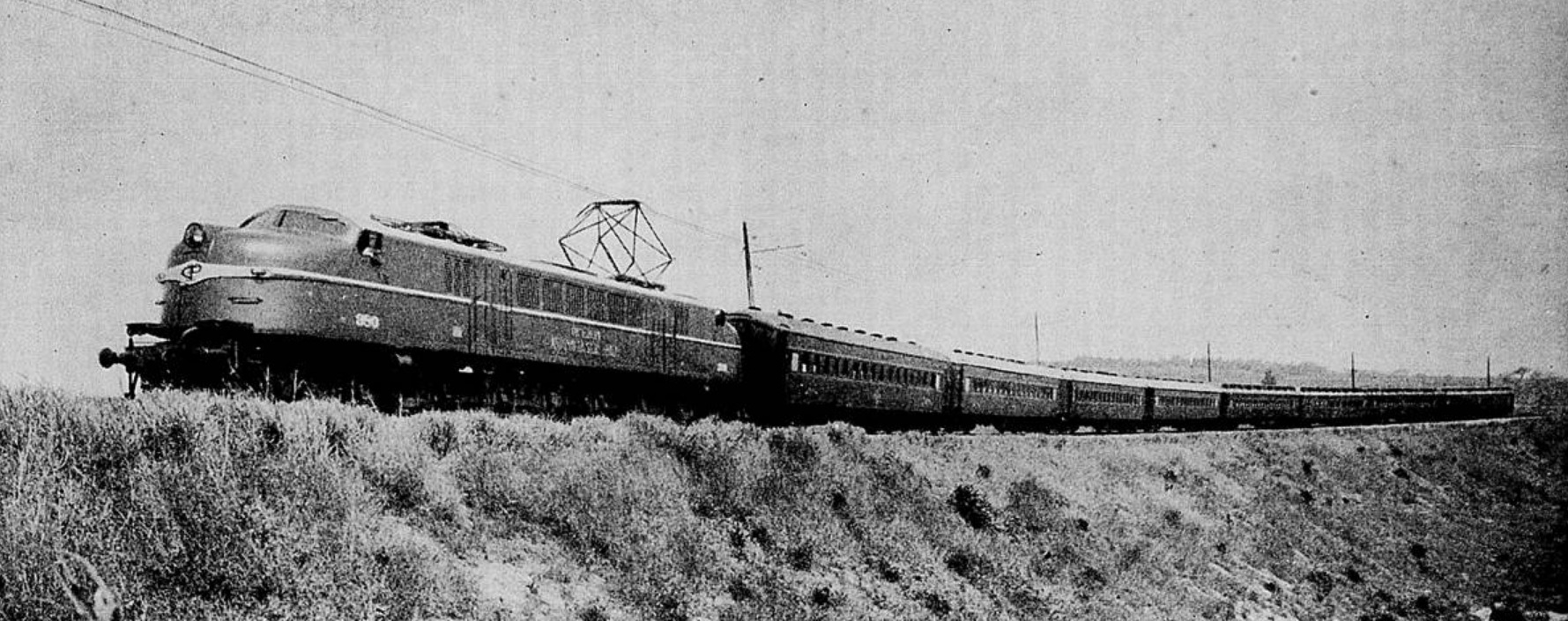
Companhia Paulista passenger train (GE 2-C+C-2 CPEF - ACF) in 1941.

The number of passengers transported by Companhia Paulista remained in constant growth, except for two periods: 1931-1935 (from the impacts of the 1929 Crisis) and 1956-1970 (when a small variation occurred as a result of a greater competition with road transport, with the opening of highways such as the Anhanguera). Even so, the company maintained an average of 10 million passengers transported each year, with 2 million celebrated as recently as its 50th anniversary in 1918. This steady growth icn the number of passengers can be partially explained by the exemplary operation and maintenance that Companhia Paulista maintained in its network, the absence of the Bandeirantes Highway (opened only in 1978) and the low traffic at Viracopos Airport. The nationalization of the railroad in late 1961 had little or no effect on passenger transportation until the extinction of the company in 1971.

Period	Number of passengers (average)	Period	Number of passengers (average)
1872/75	65690	1921/25	3338114
1876/1880	156224	1926/30	3985406
1881/85	160901	1931/35	3646563
1886/90	269097	1936/40	5943547
1891/95	1054435	1941/45	8033795
1896/00	1267245	1946–50	11388591
1901/05	988765	1951–55	11929658
1906/10	1110301	1956–60	11097029
1911/15	1977199	1961–65	10489646
1916/20	2088271	1966–70	10131863

=== Cargo ===
Companhia Paulista was created with the purpose of transporting coffee production from the Campinas region to Jundiaí and Paranapiacaba, where the SPR (owner of a railroad transport monopoly) transported the cargo to the port of Santos. With expansion into São Paulo prevented by the SPR, Companhia Paulista was expanding its tracks through the interior on the route to the coffee plantations.

While it was highly profitable, the coffee crop sustained the railroad's expansion and large coffee producers were its major shareholders. With the crises in the international coffee market, the consequent drop in prices forced the company to seek diversification in cargo transportation: grains, wood, cattle, meat, fruits, fuels, etc. To maintain business expansion, it sought loans with banks, issued new shares, and changed its shareholding control: out went the coffee growers, and in came the international banks and trusts.

During the 1940s (affected by World War II), Companhia Paulista practically doubled the volume of cargo transported in relation to the previous decade. This growth in freight transport continued and reached its peak in 1955, when the company achieved its best ever result. Despite a slight fluctuation, the company operated in its final year carrying a significant volume of cargo.

== Fleet ==
Below is a list of locomotives belonging to Companhia Paulista de Estradas de Ferro in 1968.

=== Electric locomotives ===
Model	Manufacturer	Traction	2nd original numbering	Wheeling	Manufacturing year	Total number	Power	Type	Image
GE 2-B+B-2	GE – USA	Electric	300–303; 200–203 (previous)	2-B+B-2	1921–1922	4	1428 hp	Mixed	
Baldwin-Westinghouse 1-B+B-1	Baldwin- Westinghouse	Electric	310–312; 212–213 and 216 (previous)	1-B+B-1	1921–2 units. 1925 – 1 units.	3	1627 hp	Mixed	
Winterthur-BBC 1-D-1	Winterthur- BBC	Electric	320; 231 (previous)	1-D-1	1929	1	2520 hp	Mixed	
MK 1-C+C-1	Metropolitan Vickers	Electric	330; 217 (previous)	1-C+C-1	1925	1	1923 hp	Mixed	
GE C-C; Vanderléia	GE – Brazil	Electric	350–359	C+C	1967	10	4385 hp	Mixed	
GE 2-C+C-2; V8	GE – USA	Electric	370–391	2-C+C-2	1940–1948	22	3817 hp	Mixed	
GE B+B; Quadradinha	GE – USA	Electric	400–407; 204–211 (previous)	B+B	1921	8	1428 hp	Cargo	
Baldwin-Westinghouse C+C; Cristaleira	Baldwin- Westinghouse	Electric	410–419; 214 and 215 and 219–226 (previous)	C+C	1921 – 2 units. 1927–1928 – 8 units.	10	1521 hp	Cargo	
GE 1-C+C-1; Quadradona	GE – USA	Electric	420–428; 226–230 and 420–423 (previous)	1-C+C-1	1928 – 5 units. 1919 – 1 units. 1930 – 3 units.	9	2170 hp	Cargo	
GE 2-D+D-2; Russa	GE – USA	Electric	450–454	2-D+D-2	1951	5	4655 hp	Cargo	
GE B-B; Baratinha	GE – USA	Electric	500–508	B+B	1924–1926	9	459 hp	Manoeuver	
GE B-B; Baratona	GE – USA	Electric	510–517	B+B	1947	8	459 hp	Manoeuver	

=== Diesel-Electric Locomotives ===
Model	Manufacturer	Traction	2nd original numbering	Wheeling	Manufacturing year	Total number	Power	Type	Image
ALCO PA-2	ALCO-GE	Diesel-Electric	600–602	A1A+A1A	1953	3	2250 hp	Mixed	
ALCO RSC-3	ALCO-GE	Diesel-Electric	650–661	A1A+A1A	1951	12	1600 hp	Mixed	
EMD G12	EMD	Diesel-Electric	700–717	B+B	1958	18	1310 hp	Mixed	
ALCO RSD-8	ALCO	Diesel-Electric	900–909	C+C	1958	10	900 hp	Manoeuver	
GE U9B	GE	Diesel-Electric	740–749	B+B	1958	10	912 hp	Mixed and Manoeuver	
LEW DE I PA	LEW	Diesel-Electric	750–785	B+B	1967	36	770 hp	Manoeuver	
LEW DE III M	LEW	Diesel-Electric	900–902	B+B	1967	3	1233 hp	Manoeuver	

=== Steam Locomotives ===
Class	Numbering	Manufacturer	Manufacturing year	Wheeling	Total number	Gauge	Type	Preservation	Image
1	1	Jonh Fowler & Co.	1872	4-4-0+T	1	1.60 m	Mixed	# 1	
5	5	Dübs & Co.	1888	4-4-0+T	1	1.60 m	Mixed	-	
10	7, 9	Baldwin Locomotive Works	1891	4-4-0+T	1	1.00 m	Mixed	# 7 and 9 (821)	
10	10–12	Baldwin Locomotive Works	1891	4-4-0+T	3	1.60 m	Mixed	# 10	
20	20	Companhia Paulista de Estradas de Ferro	1911	4-4-0+T	1	1.60 m	Mixed	-	
21	21–24	Baldwin Locomotive Works	1893	4-4-0+T	4	1.60 m	Mixed	-	
30	30–32	Baldwin Locomotive Works	1896	4-4-0+T	3	1.60 m	Mixed	-	
40	40, 41	Baldwin Locomotive Works	1899	4-6-0+T	2	1.60 m	Mixed	-	
50	50–55	Borsig Locomotiv Werke	1914	4-4-0+T	6	1.60 m	Mixed	-	
60	60, 61	Baldwin Locomotive Works	1909	4-6-0+T	2	1.60 m	Mixed	-	
70	70–75	American Locomotive Co.	1913	4-6-0+T	6	1.60 m	Mixed	-	
80	80–83	American Locomotive Co.	1917	4-6-2+T	4	1.60 m	Mixed	-	
110	110	Dübs & Co.	1890	2-6-2WT	1	1.60 m	Manoeuver	# 110	
111	111	Dübs & Co.	1891	2-8-0+T	1	1.60 m	Mixed	-	
120	120–127	Baldwin Locomotive Works	1891 to 1893	2-8-0+T	8	1.60 m	Mixed	-	
130	130, 131	Dübs & Co.	1884	2-8-0+T	2	1.60 m	Mixed	-	
140	140–146	Baldwin Locomotive Works	1897	2-8-0+T	7	1.60 m	Mixed	-	
150	150	Baldwin Locomotive Works	1895	2-8-0+T	1	1.60 m	Mixed	-	
160	160–165	Baldwin Locomotive Works	1895 to 1897	2-8-0+T	6	1.60 m	Mixed	-	
170	170–172	Baldwin Locomotive Works	1895 to 1897	2-8-0+T	3	1.60 m	Mixed	-	
180	180–182	Baldwin Locomotive Works	1913	2-8-0+T	3	1.60 m	Mixed	-	
190	193, 194	Henschel & Sohn	1935	4-10-2+T	2	1.60 m	Cargo	# 193	
200	200–203	Baldwin Locomotive Works	1891 to 1897	0-6-2ST	4	1.60 m	Manoeuver	# 200 and 202	
200	210–216	Baldwin Locomotive Works	1896 to 1897	0-6-2ST	7	1.60 m	Manoeuver	-	
220	220	Dübs & Co.	1890	2-4-0ST	1	1.60 m	Manoeuver	-	
230	230	Dübs & Co.	1895	4-4-0ST	1	1.60 m	Manoeuver	-	
240	240, 241	Baldwin Locomotive Works	1913	2-6-2WT	2	1.60 m	Manoeuver	-	

=== Passenger cars and others ===
Type/model	Gauge (m)	Manufacturer	Origin	Manufacturing year	Fleet
Carbon Steel	1.60	American Car and Foundry Company	USA	1928	32
Carbon Steel/Pullman	1.60	Pullman Company	USA	1954	48
Carbon Steel/"Chumbinho"	1.60	CPEF-Oficinas Rio Claro	Brazil	1967–70	43

== Lines ==
Line	Inauguration	Distance from Jundiaí	Length	Notes
1.60 m gauge
Tronco (Line 1)	August 11, 1872	0 km	506,655 km	
Tronco Oeste (Line 2)	July 1, 1885	174,370 km	613,432 km	
Ramal de Piracicaba	July 14, 1917	78,387 km	123,593 km	
Ramal de Descalvado	April 10, 1877	116,965 km	223,773 km	
Ramal de Santa Veridiana	November 26, 1891	189,882 km	38,922 km	
Ramal de Baldeação	June 1, 1913	228,370 km	1,452 km	Built to connect with Companhia Mogiana
1.00 m gauge
Ramal de Analândia	October 15, 1884	133,840 km	40,610 km	
Ramal de Campos Sales	February 19, 1887	252,268 km	41,371 km	
Ramal de Agudos	December 7, 1903	302,613 km	57,152 km	
Ramal de Água Vermelha	April 1, 1892	206,308 km	62,976 km	
Ramal de Pontal	March 25, 1903	357,370 km	55,400 km	
Ramal de Jaboticabal	June 6, 1892	285,759 km	116,916 km	
Ramal de Terra Roxa	January 11, 1927	377,995 km	32,180 km	
Ramal de Ribeirão Bonito	May 10, 1892	206,308 km	212,477 km	
Ramal de Itápolis	June 3, 1915	335,209 km	27,066 km	Former Companhia Estrada de Ferro do Dourado
Ramal de Bariri	June 2, 1910	266,728 km	62,552 km	Former Companhia Estrada de Ferro do Dourado
Ramal de Jaudourado	January 1, 1912	310,161 km	40,535 km	Former Dourado Companhia Estrada de Ferro do Dourado
Ramal de Dourado	May 9, 1912	266,728 km	14,423 km	Former Dourado Companhia Estrada de Ferro do Dourado
Ramal de Nova Granada	March 1911	397,983 km	149,144 km	
Ramal de Barra Bonita	August 15, 1929	283,232 km	12,504 km	Barra Bonita Railroad
Ramal de Luzitânia	March 13, 1916	349,418 km	35,155 km	
0.60 m gauge
Ramal de Santa Rita do Passa Quatro	October 15, 1884	205,394 km	48,458	Former Santa Rita Railroad
Ramal de Descalvadense	March 1, 1891	223,773 km	13,840 km	Former Descalvadense Railroad

== See also ==
- Rede Ferroviária Federal, Sociedade Anônima (RFFSA)

== Bibliography ==
- BEM, Sueli Ferreira de. Contribuição para estudos das estações ferroviárias paulistas. 1998. Dissertação (Mestrado em Estruturas Ambientais Urbanas) - Faculdade de Arquitetura e Urbanismo, Universidade de São Paulo, São Paulo, 1998. link.
- CAMPOS, Cristina de. Ferrovias e saneamento em São Paulo. O engenheiro Antonio de Paula Souza da rede de infra-estrutura territorial urbana paulista, 1870-1893. 2007. Tese (Doutorado) - Faculdade de Arquitetura e Urbanismo, USP, São Paulo, 2007. link.
- CAVALCANTI, F. R. "Companhia Paulista de Estradas de Ferro: Uma ferrovia modelo no Brasil". In: Centro-Oeste, s.d. link.
- DEBES, Célio. A caminho do Oeste: História da Companhia Paulista de Estradas de Ferro. São Paulo: Indústria Gráfica Bentivegna Editôra, 1968.
- GRANDI, Guilherme. Café e Expansão Ferroviária: A Companhia E. F. Rio Claro (1880-1903). São Paulo: Annablume/FAPESP, 2007
- GRANDI, Guilherme. Estado e capital ferroviário em São Paulo: a Companhia Paulista de Estradas de Ferro entre 1930 e 1961. 2010. Tese (Doutorado em História Econômica) - Faculdade de Filosofia, Letras e Ciências Humanas, Universidade de São Paulo, São Paulo, 2011. link.
- GIESBRECHT, R. M. "Estações Ferroviárias do Estado de São Paulo". In: Estações Ferroviárias do Brasil, s.d link.
- INOUE, L. M. Fim da Linha? Vilas ferroviárias da Companhia Paulista (1868-1961): uma investigação sobre história e preservação. Tese (Doutorado em Arquitetura e Urbanismo) - Faculdade de Arquitetura e Urbanismo - USP, 2016. link.
- PÉREZ, Filemón. Album Illustrado da Companhia Paulista de Estradas de Ferro. São Paulo, 1918. 5 partes: 1, 2, 3, 4, 5.
- PINTO, Adolfo Augusto Pinto. Minha Vida: Memórias de um Engenheiro Paulista. São Paulo: Conselho Estadual de Cultura, 1969.
- PINTO, Adolfo Augusto Pinto. História da Viação Pública de São Paulo (Brasil). São Paulo: Tipografia de Vanorden, 1903.
- SEGNINI, L. R. P. Ferrovia e ferroviários: uma contribuição para a analise do poder disciplinar na empresa. São Paulo: Ed. Autores Associados; Cortez Ed., 1982. link.
- TASSI, Rafael Prudente Corrêa. Locomotivas elétricas da Companhia Paulista de Estradas de Ferro: Electric locomotives of the Paulista Railway Company. Rio de Janeiro: Memória do Trem, 2015.
