= Basilica of Our Lady of Carmel, Campinas =

Coordinates: 22.9017°S 47.0603°W

Basilica of Our Lady of Carmel
- Basílica Nossa Senhora do Carmo
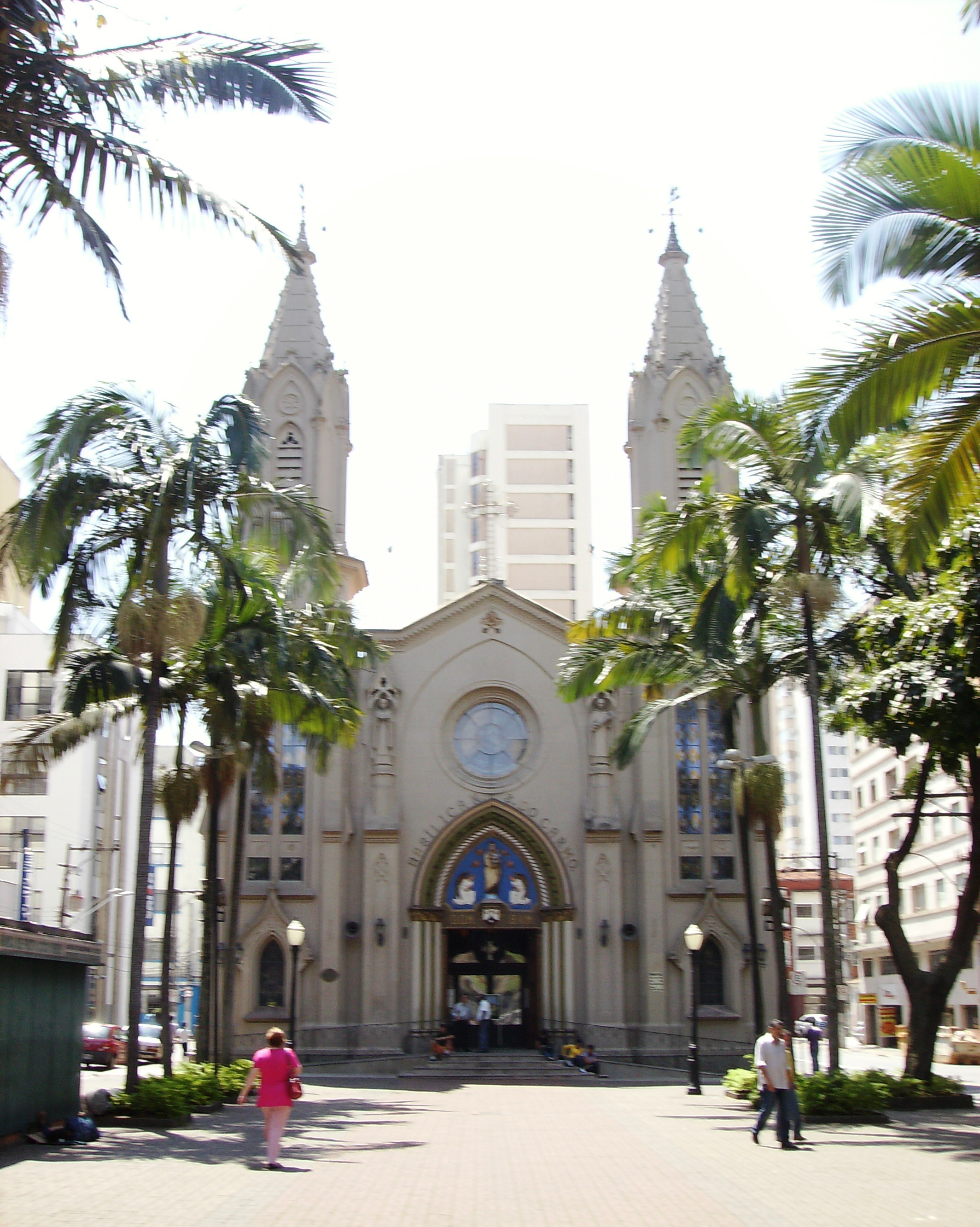
- Basilica of Our Lady of Carmel
- Location: Campinas
- Country: Brazil
- Denomination: Roman Catholic Church

The Basilica of Our Lady of Carmel (Portuguese: Basílica Nossa Senhora do Carmo) Also Basilica of Campinas Is a basilica located in the sector of Largo do Carmo, in the center of Campinas in the state of São Paulo in the south of Brazil. Originally it was the main church of the city and around which it developed Campinas.

The original building began on July 14, 1774, with the first Mass, when the founding of the parish and the city of Campinas took place. It was a temporary matrix, covered with straw, located where today stands the monument to Carlos Gomes. This provisional matrix worked from the foundation of the city until it was ready the definitive mother church, that opened 25 July 1781. This church was the seat of the parish of Our Lady of the Conception, during the colony in and time of the Empire of Brazil.

This "old matrix" was almost destroyed in the 1920s, with the exception of the main altar and the towers when there was the construction of the existing church today, inspired by the neo-Gothic style.

== See also ==
- Roman Catholicism in Brazil
- Our Lady of Carmel

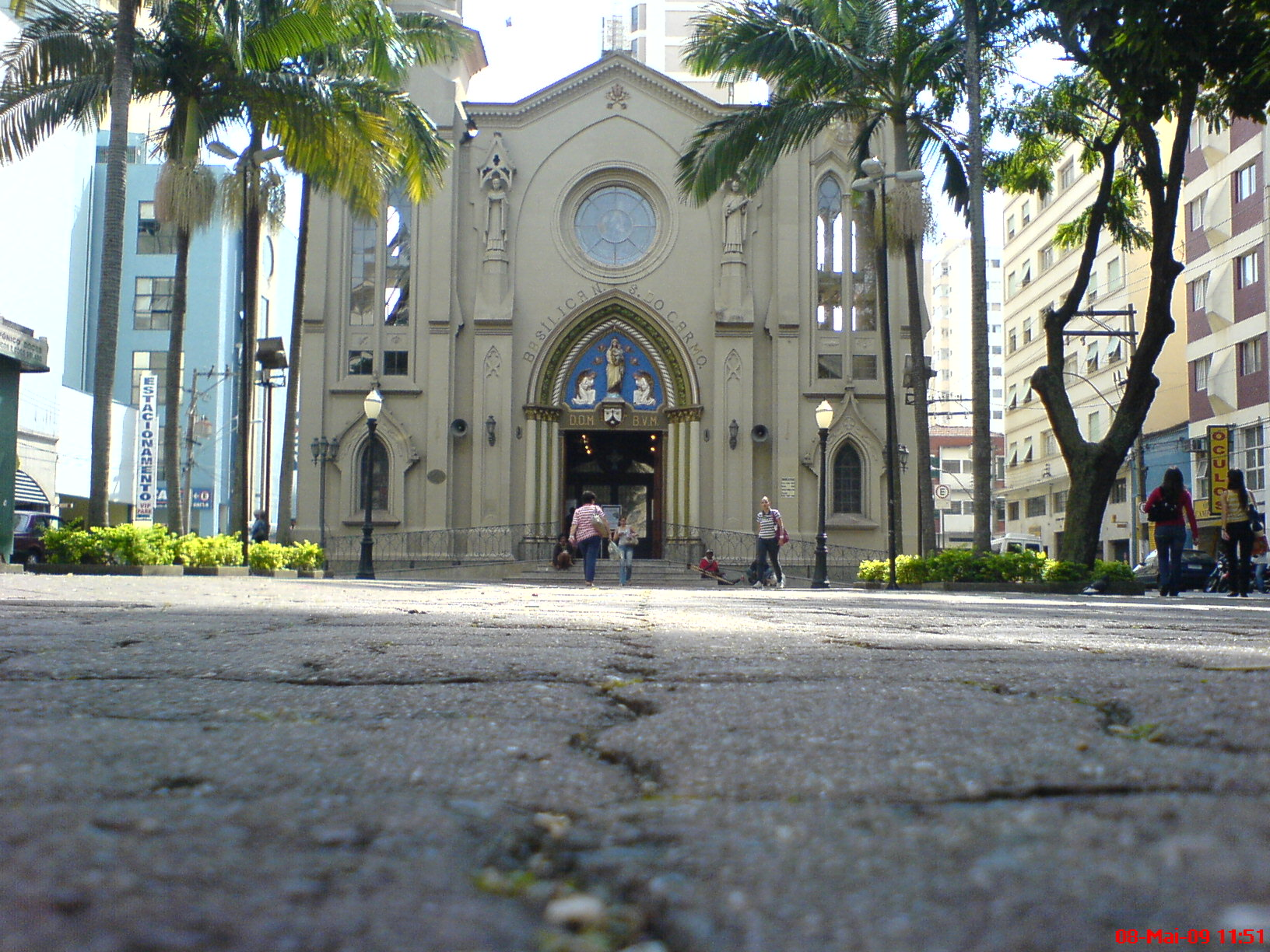
Another View
