= Campinas Station =

Former 19th-century railway station in Campinas, Brazil

Campinas station Estação Campinas
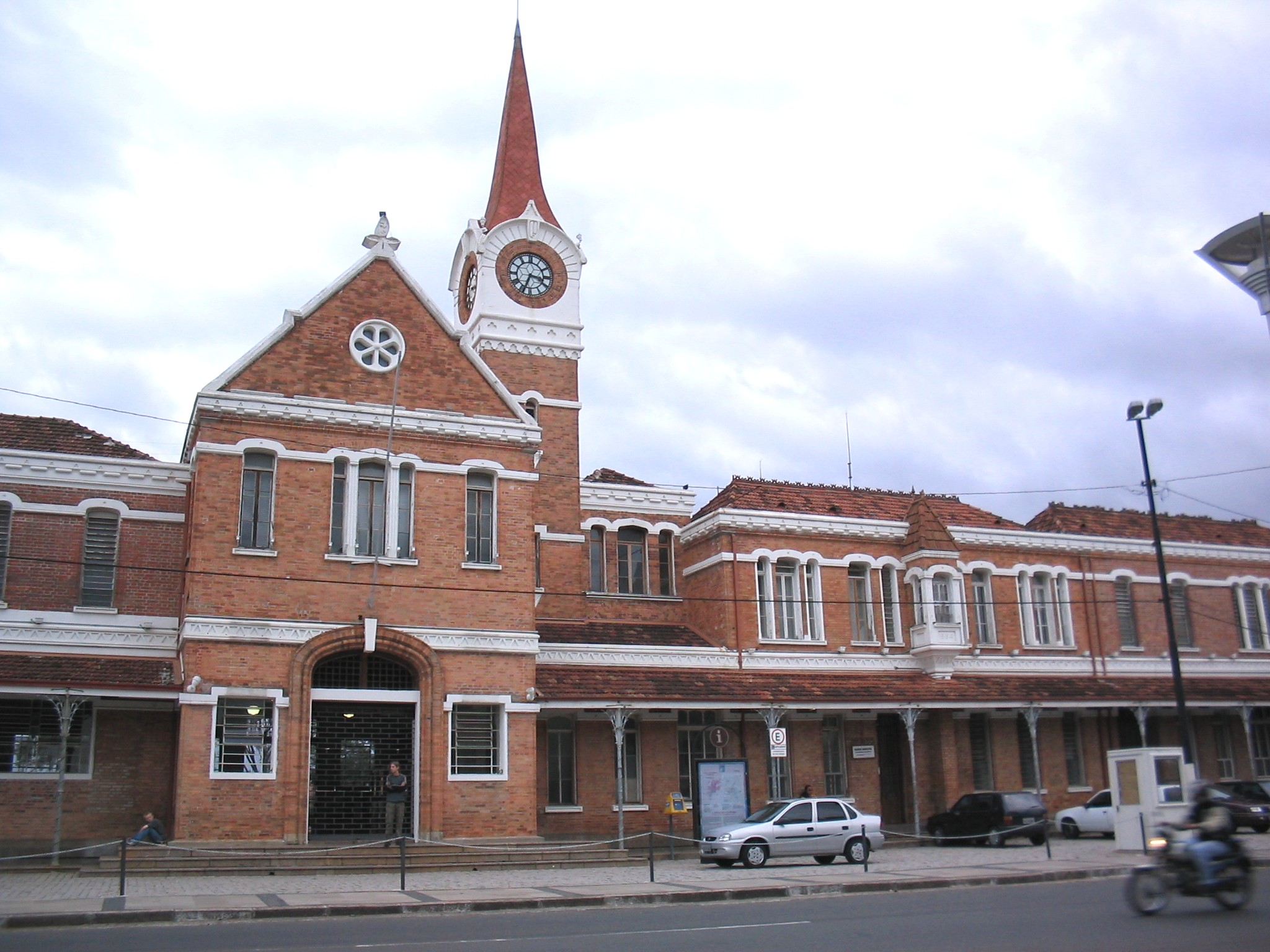
- Partial view of the station's façade

General information
- Other names: Estação Cultura Prefeito Antônio da Costa Santos
- Location: Praça Marechal Floriano Peixoto, s/nº, Campinas, SP (Brazil)
- Coordinates: 22°54′30″S 47°41′4″W
- Manager: Government of Campinas
- Line: Trunk line Jundiaí- Colômbia

Other information
- Station code: SP-0883

History
- Opened: 11 August 1872
- Closed: 15 March 2001
Location

The Estação Cultura "Prefeito Antônio da Costa Santos", also known as Estação Campinas ("Campinas Station"), Estação Central ("Campinas Central Station"), or Estação Fepasa ("Fepasa Station"), is the former central railway station of the city of Campinas, in the interior of the state of São Paulo, Brazil.

It functions as a cultural center since 2002.

The station was elected as one of the Seven Wonders of the City in 2007.

== History ==
Inaugurated on August 11, 1872, the station was listed as a historical and cultural heritage site in 1982 by the city of Campinas.

Built with bricks imported from England, it preserves to this day an architecture reminiscent of the Victorian Era. By 1884, its central body had been completed, with two side wings added by 1930.

From the outside of the station, a 200-meter-long pedestrian tunnel, built in 1918, can be accessed. The passage connects the city center to Vila Industrial.

The railway station was a departure point for Constitutionalist soldiers heading to the battlefields in the Revolution of 1932.

It served as a station until March 15, 2001, when the last passenger train left, bound for Araraquara. In the same year, due to the future deactivation of the Federal Railway Network (RFFSA), Mayor Antônio da Costa Santos, with the authorization of the Federal government, transformed the space into a cultural center, administered by the City Hall. The inauguration of Estação Cultural ("Cultural Station") took place on August 11, 2002, exactly 130 years after the inaugural trip of the train that connected Jundiaí to Campinas. Santos did not get to see the Estação Cultura inaugurated, because on September 10, 2001, he was murdered.

On September 9, 2011, in his honor, Mayor Demétrio Vilagra signed the municipal decree No. 17,402, published in the Government gazette of the municipality on September 12, naming the cultural complex Estação Cultura Prefeito Antônio da Costa Santos.
