= São Paulo (state) =

State of Brazil

- State
- Flag Coat of arms
- Nickname: Bandeirante State
- Motto: Pro Brasilia Fiant Eximia (Latin) "Let great things be done for Brazil"
- Anthem: Bandeirantes Anthem
- Location in Brazil
- Coordinates: 22°04′12″S 48°26′01″W
- Country: Brazil
- Region: Southeast
- Capital and largest city: São Paulo

Government
  - Type: Unitary state
  - Governor: Tarcísio de Freitas (REP)
  - Vice Governor: Felicio Ramuth (MDB)
  - Senators: Alexandre Giordano (PODE); Marcos Pontes (PL); Mara Gabrilli (PSD)
  - Legislature: Legislative Assembly of São Paulo

Area
  - Total: 248,219.5 km^{2} (95,838.1 sq mi)
  - Rank: 12th

Population (2025)
  - Total: 46,081,801
  - Rank: 1st
  - Density: 185.6494/km^{2} (480.8297/sq mi)
  - Rank: 3rd
- Demonym: Paulista

GDP (2024)
  - Total: R$3.662 trillion (US$679.541 billion)

HDI (2024)
  - Category: 0.838 (2nd) – very high
- Time zone: UTC-03:00 (BRT)
- Postal Code: 01000-000 to 19990-000
- ISO 3166 code: BR-SP
- Website: sp.gov.br/sp

São Paulo (/ˌsaʊ(m) ˈpaʊloʊ/, Portuguese: [sɐ̃w ˈpawlu]) is one of the 26 states of the Federative Republic of Brazil and is named after Saint Paul of Tarsus. It is located in the Southeast Region and is bordered by the states of Minas Gerais to the north and northeast, Paraná to the south, Rio de Janeiro to the east, and Mato Grosso do Sul to the west, in addition to the Atlantic Ocean to the southeast. It is divided into 645 municipalities. The total area is 248,219.481 square kilometres (95,838.077 square miles), comprising 2.9% of Brazil's territory. Its capital is the municipality of São Paulo, which is the most populous city in the country.

With more than 44 million inhabitants in 2022, São Paulo is the most populous Brazilian state, comprising around 22% of the Brazilian population. It is the world's 28th-most-populous sub-national entity, the most populous sub-national entity in the Americas, and the fourth-most-populous political entity of South America, surpassed only by the rest of the Brazilian federation, Colombia, and Argentina. The local population is one of the most diverse in the country. Ethnic groups present in the state include Portuguese, who colonized Brazil; Italians, who began immigrating to the country in the late 19th century; Indigenous peoples, many distinct ethnic groups; Africans, who were brought from Africa as enslaved people in the colonial era and migrants from other regions of the country. Arabs, Armenians, Chinese, Germans, Greeks, Japanese, Spanish, and American Southerners are some other national backgrounds present in the local population.

The region of São Paulo was inhabited by Indigenous peoples from approximately 12,000 BC. In the early 16th century, the coast was visited by Portuguese and Spanish explorers and navigators. In 1532, Martim Afonso de Sousa founded São Vicente, which was the first permanent Portuguese settlement in the Americas. In the 17th century, the paulistas bandeirantes intensified the exploration of the colony's interior, which eventually expanded the territorial domain of the Portuguese Empire in South America; this would later result in the state being nicknamed the "Bandeirante State". In the 18th century, after the establishment of the province of São Paulo, the region began to gain political power, and after independence in 1822, São Paulo became a major agricultural producer in the newly constituted Empire of Brazil (mainly coffee). It developed a wealthy regional rural oligarchy over the course of the 19th century, which would shared control of the Brazilian government with the elites of Minas Gerais during the early republican period in the 1890s. Under the Vargas Era, the state was one of the first to initiate a process of industrialization and became one of the most urbanized regions of the federation.

São Paulo's economy is large and diversified, accounting for around 31% of Brazil's total wealth. It is the centre of industrial, scientific and technological production in Brazil, and is the world's largest producer of orange juice, sugar and ethanol. If it were a sovereign state, its nominal GDP would be the 21st largest in the world (2020 estimate). São Paulo is also a major tourist destination in Brazil, and has multiple sites inscribed on the UNESCO World Heritage List. Among all Brazilian states, it has the second-highest Human Development Index (HDI), the fourth GRDP per capita, the second-lowest infant mortality rate, the third-highest life expectancy, the lowest homicide rate, and the third-lowest rate of illiteracy.

== History ==
=== Early period ===
The region of the current state of São Paulo was already inhabited by Amerindian peoples since at least approximately 10,000 BCE, as evidenced by studies carried out in ancient archaeological sites (such as the sites Caetetuba, Bastos, Boa Esperança II and Lagoa do Camargo) in different parts of the current territory of São Paulo. There are even records (e.g. - studies at the Rincão I archaeological site) that suggest that ancient human occupation was already present in São Paulo 17 thousand years ago, during the last glacial maximum. There are also several archaeological sites (such as Caetetuba, Alice Boer and Rincão I) in the central portion of the state that share similar patterns of working rocks into stone points and plano-convex artifacts similar to each other, so that they are seen as members of the same ancient ancestral culture, linked to the Rioclarense lithic industry. These ancient human groups were hunter-gatherers, living as nomads and semi-nomads in the current territory of São Paulo, living directly from what they could obtain from the local land.

In pre-European times, the area that is now São Paulo state was occupied by the Tupi people's nation, who subsisted through hunting and cultivation. The first European to settle in the area was João Ramalho, a Portuguese sailor who may have been shipwrecked around 1510, ten years after the first Portuguese landfall in Brazil. He married the daughter of a local chieftain and became a settler. In 1532, the first colonial expedition, led by Martim Afonso de Sousa of Portugal, landed at São Vicente (near the present-day port at Santos). De Sousa added Ramalho's settlement to his colony.

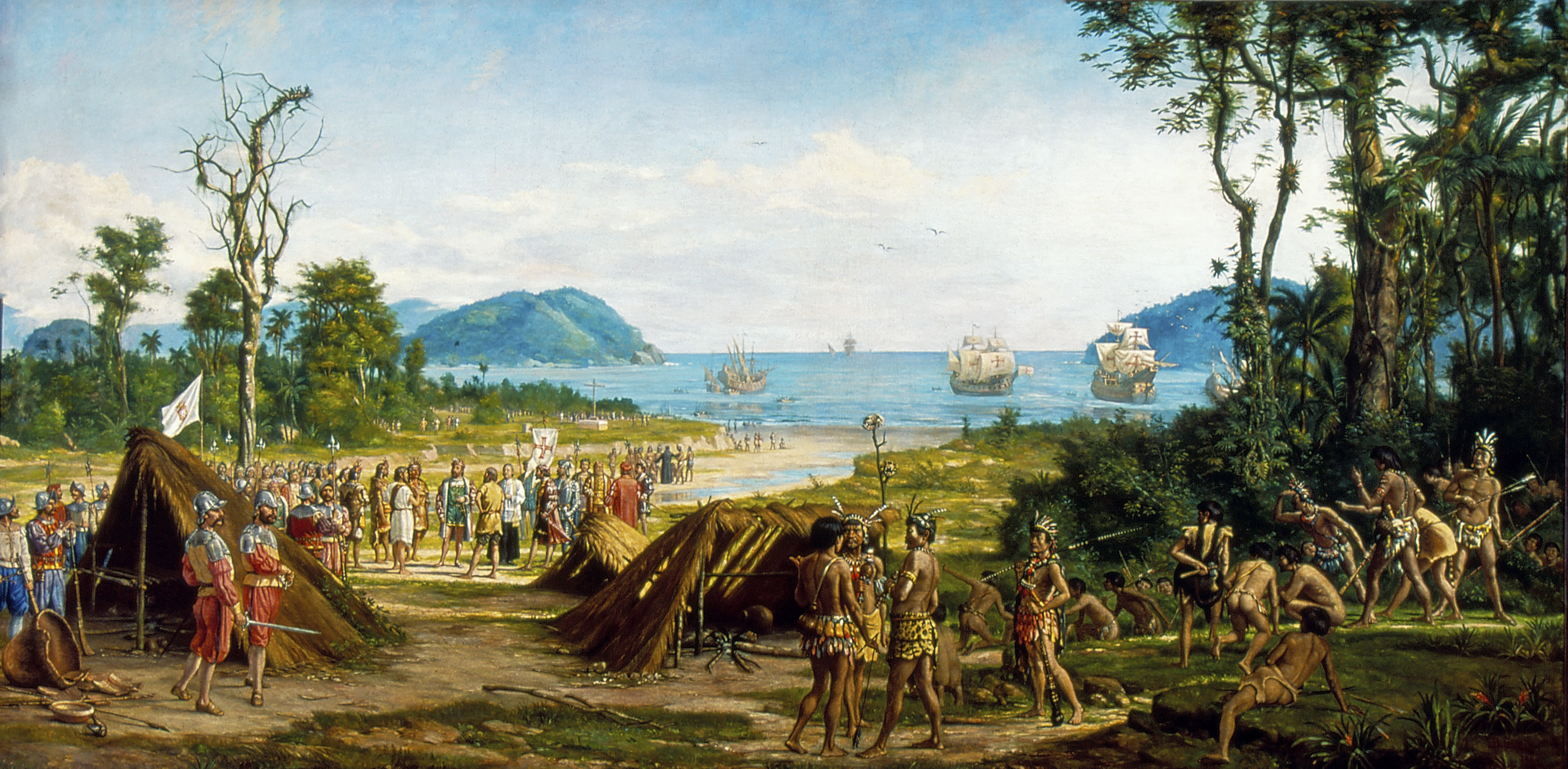
Founding of São Vicente, by Benedito Calixto

Early European colonization of Brazil was very limited. Portugal was more interested in Africa and Asia. But with English and French raiding privateer ships just off the coast, the territory had to be protected. Unwilling to shoulder the naval defense burden himself, the Portuguese ruler, King Joao III, divided the coast into "captaincies", or swathes of land, 50 leagues apart. He distributed them among well-connected Portuguese, hoping that each would be self-reliant. The early port and sugar-cultivating settlement of São Vicente was one rare success connected to this policy. In 1548, João III brought Brazil under direct royal control.

Fearing Indian attack, he discouraged development of the territory's vast interior. Some whites headed nonetheless for Piratininga, a plateau near São Vicente, drawn by its navigable rivers and agricultural potential. Borda do Campo, the plateau settlement, became an official town (Santo André da Borda do Campo) in 1553. The history of São Paulo city proper begins with the founding of a Jesuit mission of the Roman Catholic order of clergy on 25 January 1554—the anniversary of Saint Paul's conversion. The station, which is at the heart of the current city, was named São Paulo dos Campos de Piratininga (or just Pateo do Colégio). In 1560, the threat of Indian attack led many to flee from the exposed Santo André da Borda do Campo to the walled fortified Colegio. Two years later, the Colégio was besieged. Though the town survived, fighting took place sporadically for another three decades.

By 1600, the town had about 1,500 citizens and 150 households. Little was produced for export, save a number of agricultural goods. The isolation was to continue for many years, as the development of Brazil centered on the sugar plantations in the north-east.

The city's location, at the mouth of the Tietê-Paranapanema river system (which winds into the interior), made it an ideal base for another activity—enslaving expeditions. The economics were simple. Enslaved manpower for Brazil's northern sugar plantations were in short supply. Enslaved Africans were expensive, so demand for indigenous captives soared. The task was, nonetheless, hard, if not impossible, to achieve.

=== Expansion ===
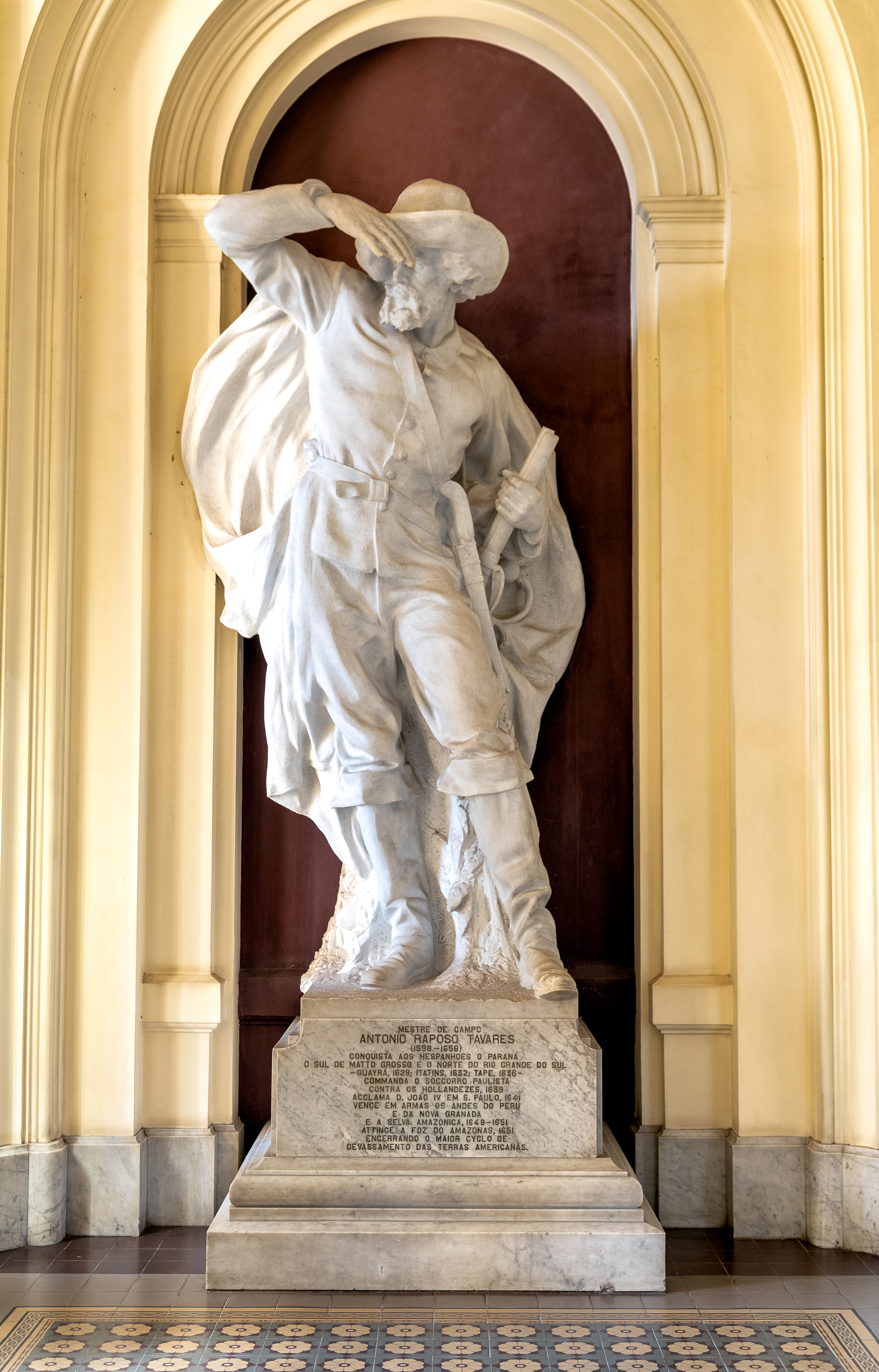
António Raposo Tavares, a colonial bandeirante

Among those who attempted to enslave the native were explorers of the hinterland called "bandeirantes". From their base in São Paulo, they also combed the interior in search of natural riches. Silver, gold and diamonds were companion pursuits, as well as the exploration of unknown territories. Roman Catholic missionaries sometimes tagged along, as efforts at converting the natives' aborigines (Indians) worked hand in hand with Portuguese colonialism.

Despite their atrocities, the wild and hardy bandeirantes are now equally remembered for penetrating Brazil's vast interior. Trading posts established by them became permanent settlements. Interior routes opened up. Though the bandeirantes had no loyalty to the Portuguese crown, they did claim land for the king. Thus, the borders of Brazil were pushed forward to the northwest and the Amazon region and west to the Andes Mountains.

French Emperor Napoleon's invasion of Portugal in 1807 prompted the British with their vast powerful Royal Navy to evacuate King João VI of Portugal, Portugal's prince regent, from the capital Lisbon, across the Atlantic to Rio de Janeiro and Brazil then became the first overseas colony to become the temporary headquarters of the Portuguese Empire. João VI rewarded his hosts with economic reforms that would prove crucial to São Paulo's rise. Brazil's ports—long closed to non-Portuguese ships—were opened up to international trade. Restrictions on domestic manufacturing were waived.

When Napoleon was defeated in 1815, with the end of the Napoleonic Wars, João gave political shape to his territory, which soon became the United Kingdom of Portugal, Brazil and the Algarves. Portugal and Brazil, in other words, were ostensibly co-equals. Returning to Portugal six years later, João left his son, Pedro, to rule as regent and governor.

=== Empire of Brazil period ===
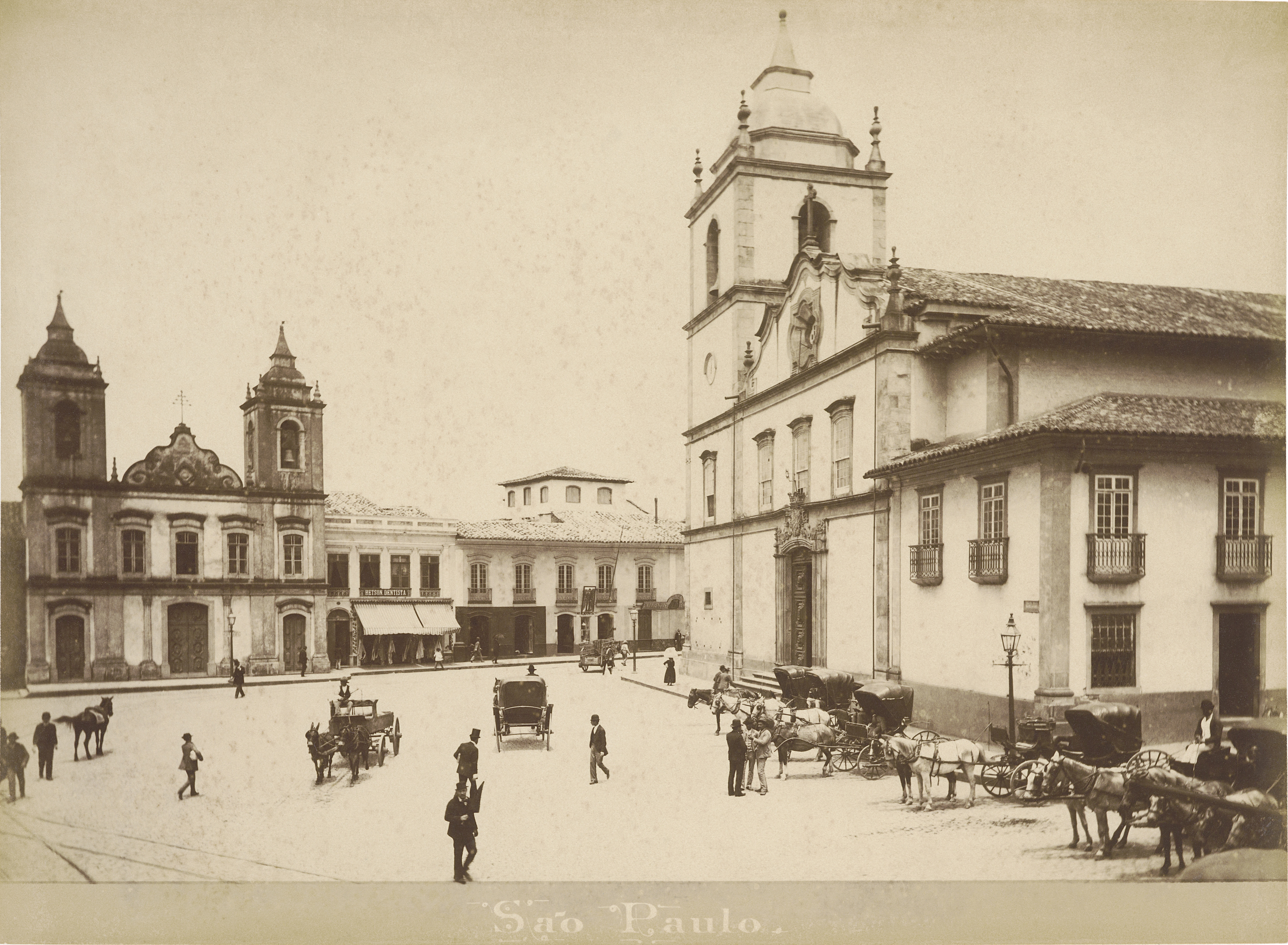
São Paulo in 1880 during the reign of Emperor Pedro II.

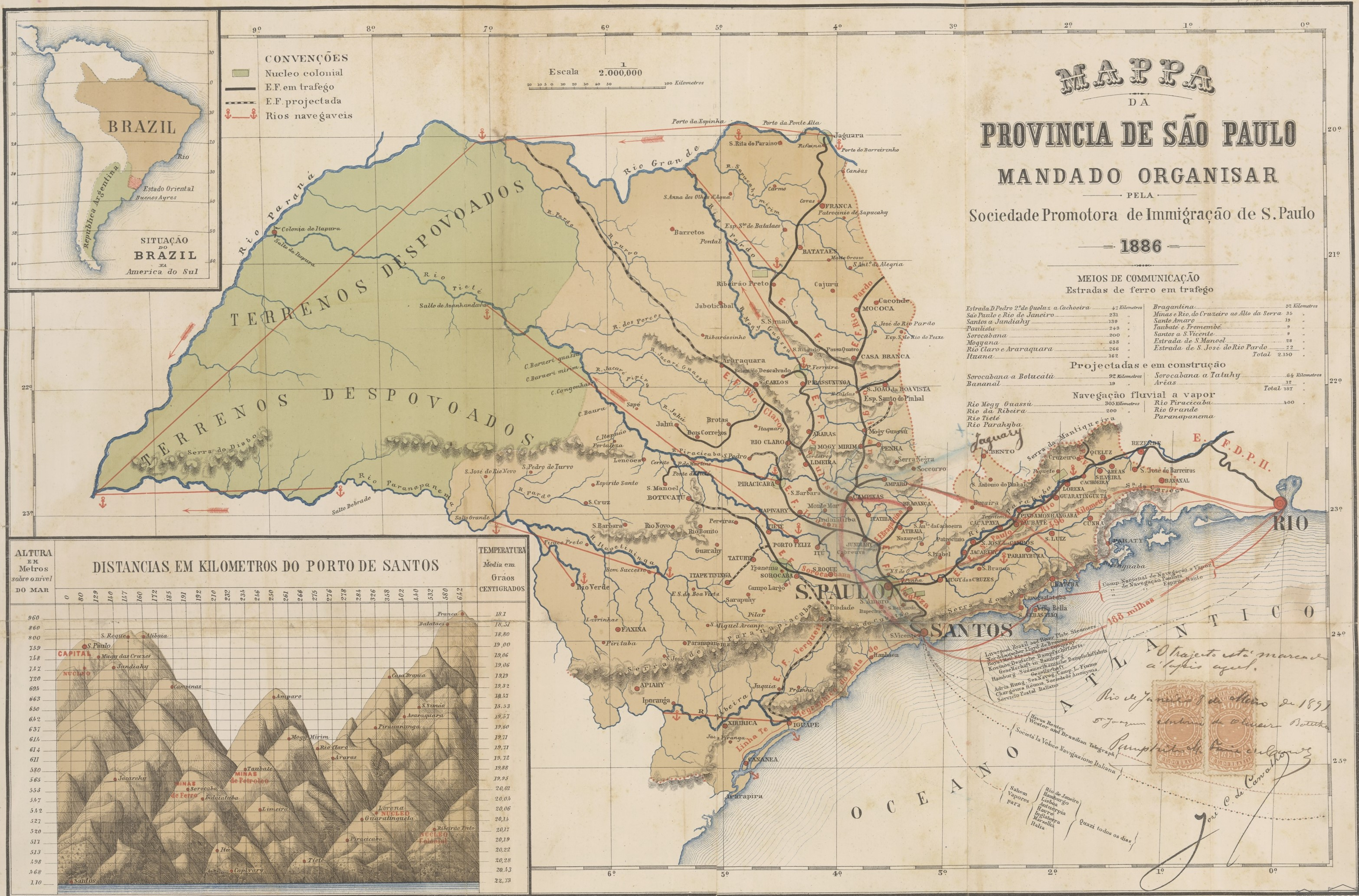
An 1886 map of the São Paulo State

Pedro I of Brazil inherited his father's love of Brazil, resisting demands from Lisbon that Brazil should be ruled from Europe once again. Legend has it that in 1822 the regent was riding outside São Paulo when a messenger delivered a missive demanding his return to Europe, and Dom Pedro waved his sword and shouted "Independência ou morte!" (Independence or death).

João had whetted the appetite of Brazilians, who now sought a full break from the monarchy. The ever-restless Paulistas were at the vanguard of the independence movement. The small mother country of Portugal was in no position to resist—on 7 September 1822, Dom Pedro rubber-stamped Brazil's independence. He was crowned emperor shortly afterwards. The emperors ruled an independent Brazil until 1889. Over this time, the growth of liberalism in Europe had a parallel in Brazil. As the Brazilian provinces became more assertive, São Paulo was the scene of a minor (and unsuccessful) liberal revolution in 1842. When independence was declared, the city of São Paulo had just 25,000 people and 4,000 houses, but the next 60 years would see gradual growth. In 1828, the Law School, the pioneer of the city's intellectual tradition, opened. The first newspaper, O Farol Paulistano, appeared in 1827. Municipal developments such as botanical gardens, an opera house and a library, gave the city a cultural boost.

Regardless, São Paulo still faced many hurdles, especially transport. Mule-trains were the main method of transportation, and the road from the plateau down to the port of Santos was famously arduous. In the late 1860s São Paulo got its first railway line, developed by British engineers, to the Port of Santos. Other lines, such as a railway to Campinas, were soon built. This was good timing, because in the 1880s the coffee craze hit in earnest. Brazil, which had been growing it since the mid-18th century, could grow more. The Paraíba valley, which spans the states of Rio de Janeiro and São Paulo, had suitable soil and climate. São Paulo city, at the western end of the Paraíba valley, was well positioned to channel the coffee to the port of Santos.

=== Republican era ===
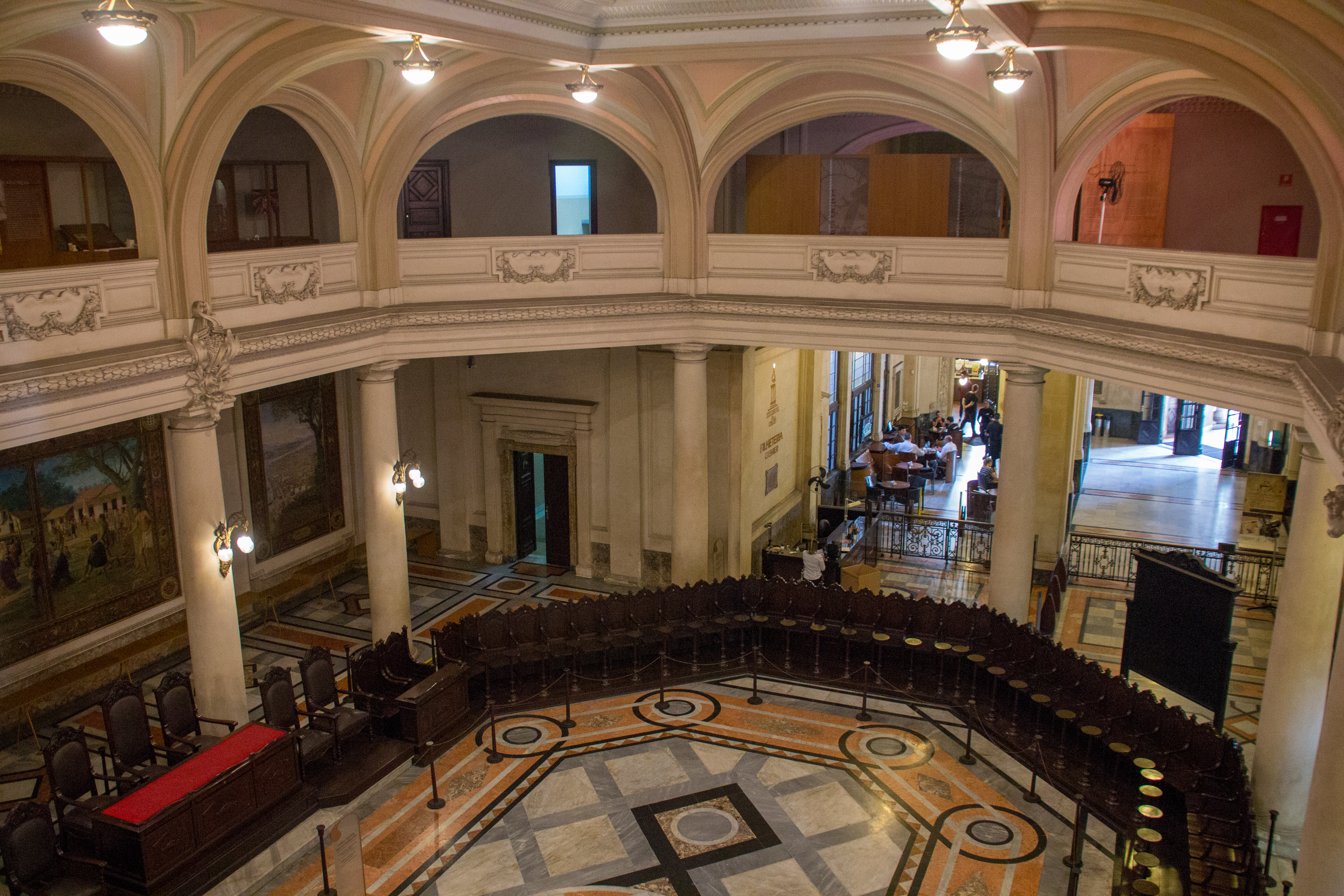
Coffee Stock Exchange, in Santos

Meanwhile, the Brazilian monarchy had fallen in 1889. A feudalistic regime, the new republic had friends only among the sugar planters of the Northeast, whose dominance Paulistanos, among others, despised. In 1891, a new federal constitution, which delegated power to the states, was approved. The new coffee elite saw its chance. São Paulo ironed out a power-sharing understanding—known as the "café com leite" (coffee-and-milk) deal—with dairy-rich Minas Gerais, Brazil's other dominant state. Together, they held a virtual lock on federal power. Brazilian politics now became a favourite pastime of the once-rebellious Paulistanos, who sent several presidents to Rio de Janeiro—including Prudente de Morais, Brazil's first civilian president, who took office in 1894.

Plantation labor was needed—this time for coffee, not sugar. Slavery had been fading since the import of enslaved Africans was outlawed in 1850. São Paulo, thanks to such figures as Luiz Gama (a former slave), was a center of abolitionism. In 1888, Brazil abolished slavery (it was the last country in the Americas to do so) and the freed African-Brazilians who had been helping build the nation were then forced to beg for their jobs back, working for food and shelter only because of the failure of the system to integrate them as equal citizens with Euro-Brazilians. In an effort to "bleach the race", as the nation's leaders feared Brazil was becoming a "black country", Spanish, Portuguese and Italian nationals were given incentives to become farm workers in São Paulo. The state government was so eager to bring in European immigrants that it paid for their trips and provided varying levels of subsidy.

By 1893, foreigners made up over 55 percent of São Paulo's population. Fearing oversupply, the government applied the brakes briefly in 1899; then the boom resumed. From 1908, the Japanese arrived in great numbers, many destined for the plantations on fixed-term contracts. By 1920, São Paulo was Brazil's second-largest city; a half-century before, it had been just the tenth-largest. Immigration and migration of Paulistas from other towns as citizens from other states of Brazil, the coffee industry, and modernization through the manufacturing of textiles, car and airplane parts, as well as food and technological industries, construction, fashion, and services transformed the greater São Paulo area into a thriving megalopolis and one of the world's greatest multiethnic regions.

=== Early 20th century ===
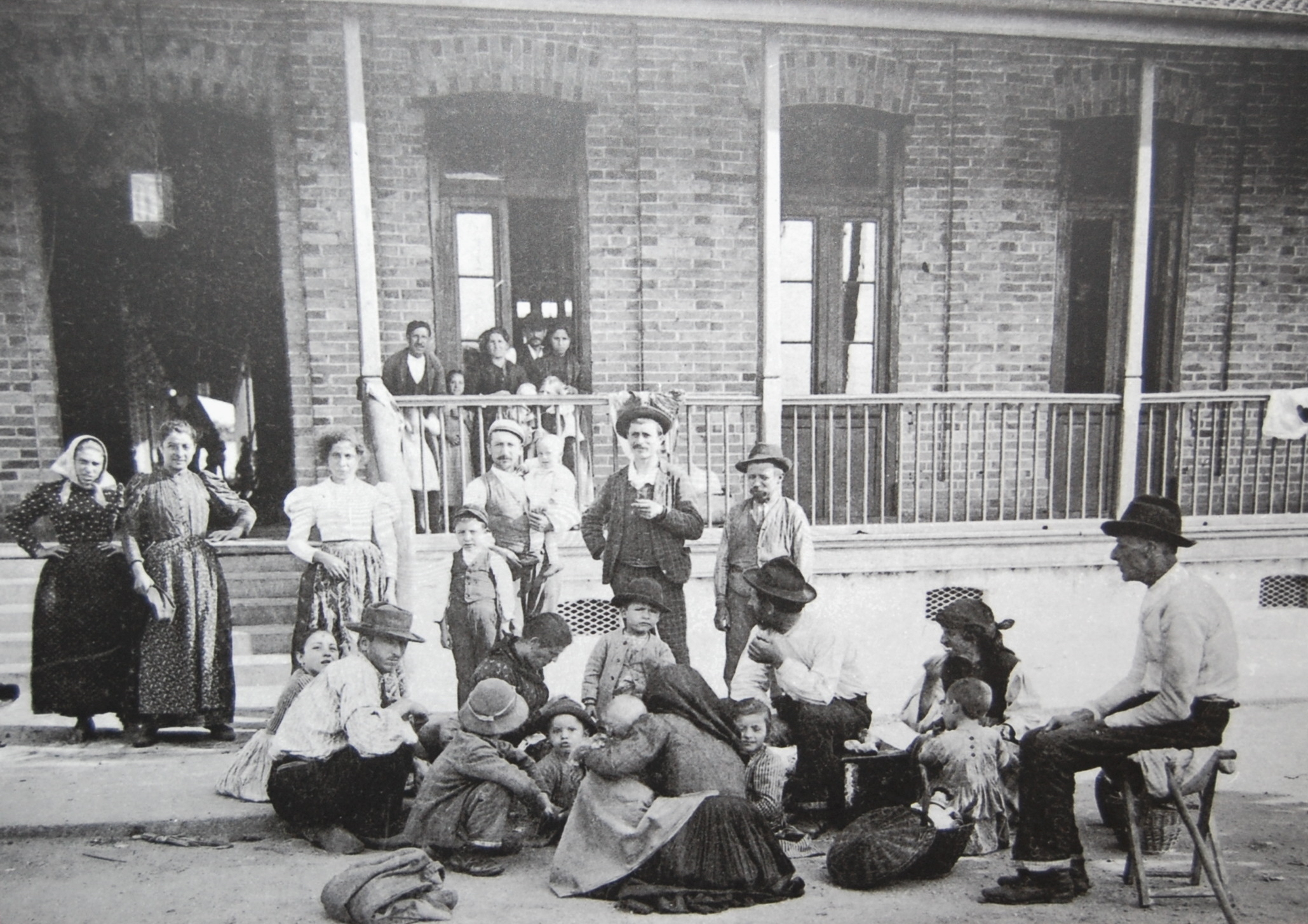
Italian immigrants arriving in São Paulo.

Between 1901 and 1910, coffee made up 51 percent of Brazil's total exports, far overshadowing rubber, sugar and cotton. But reliance on coffee made Brazil (and São Paulo in particular) vulnerable to poor harvests and the whims of world markets. The development of plantations in the 1890s, and widespread reliance on credit, took place against fluctuating prices and supply levels, culminating in saturation of the international market around the start of the 20th century. The government's policies of "valorisation"—borrowing money to buy coffee and stockpiling it, in order to have a surplus during bad harvests, and meanwhile taxing coffee exports to pay off loans—seemed feasible in the short term (as did its manipulation of foreign-exchange rates to the advantage of coffee growers). But in the longer term, these actions contributed to oversupply and eventual collapse.

São Paulo's industrial development, from 1889 into the 1940s, was gradual and inward looking. Initially, industry was closely associated with agriculture: cotton plantations led to the growth of textile manufacturing. Coffee planters were among the early industrial investors.

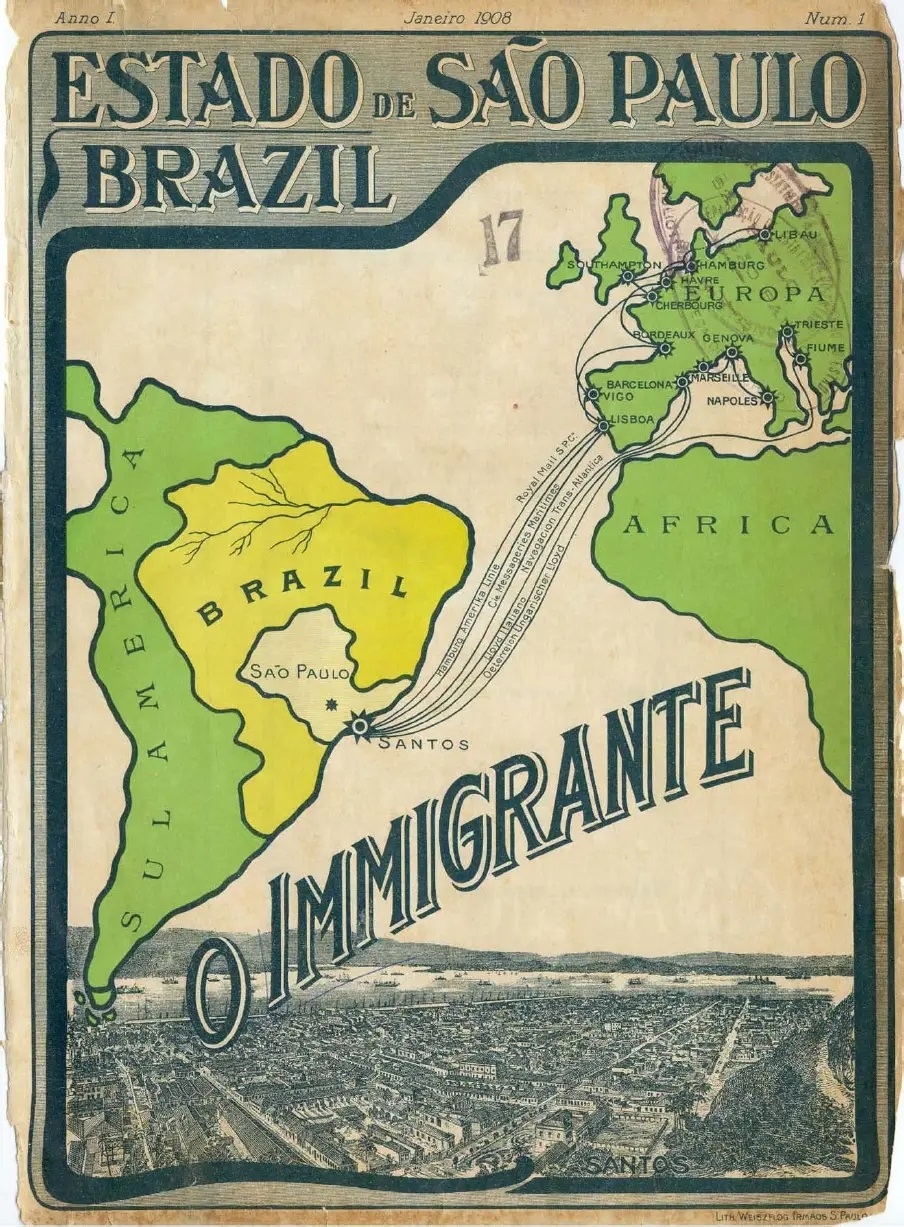
The Immigrant magazine, 1908

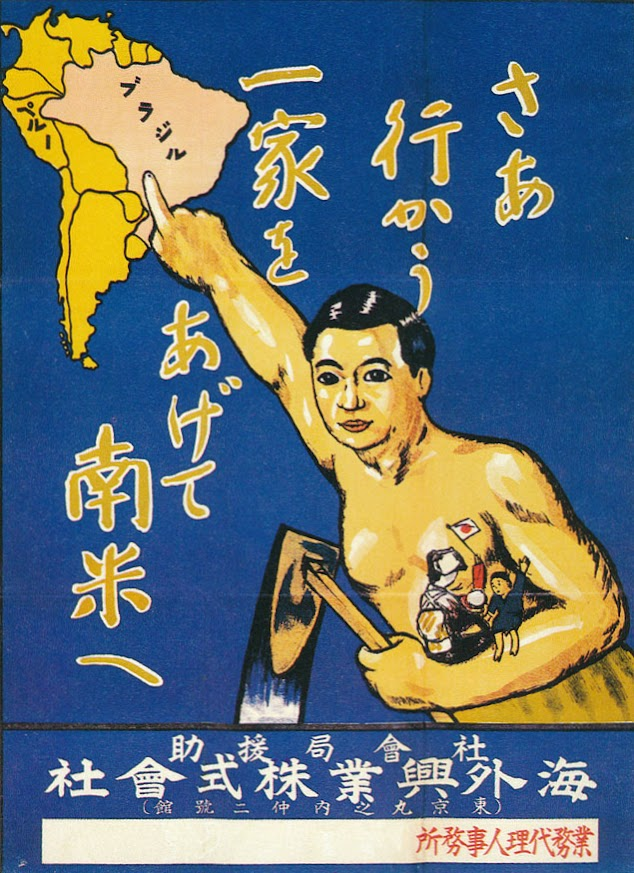
Propaganda poster of Japanese immigration to Brazil

The boom in immigration provided a market for goods, and sectors such as food processing grew. Traditional immigrant families such as the Matarazzo, Diniz, Mofarrej and Maluf became industrialists, entrepreneurs, and leading politicians.

Restrictions on imports forced by world wars and government policies of "import substitution" and trade tariffs, all contributed to industrial growth. By 1945, São Paulo had become the largest industrial center in South America. World War I sent ripples through Brazil. Inflation was rampant. Some 50,000 workers went on strike.

The growing of the urban population grew increasingly resentful of the coffee elite. Disaffected intellectuals expressed their views during a memorable "Week of Modern Art" in 1922. Two years later, a garrison of soldiers staged a revolt (eventually quashed by government troops).

The stand-off was also political: politics had been long monopolised by the Paulista Republican Party, but in 1926 a more left-leaning party rose in opposition. In 1928, the PRP amended São Paulo's state constitution to give it more control over the city. The turbulence was mirrored on Brazil's national scene. With the Great Depression, coffee prices plunged, as did real GDP. Americans, keen investors during the 1920s, backed away.

The opening of the first highway between São Paulo and Rio in 1928 was one of the few bright spots. Into the breach stepped Getúlio Vargas, a southerner veteran in state politics. In Brazil's 1930 presidential elections, he opposed Júlio Prestes, a favorite son of São Paulo. Vargas lost the election, but with backing from Minas Gerais state—São Paulo's former ally and neighbor to the north—he seized power regardless.

=== Constitutionalist Revolution ===
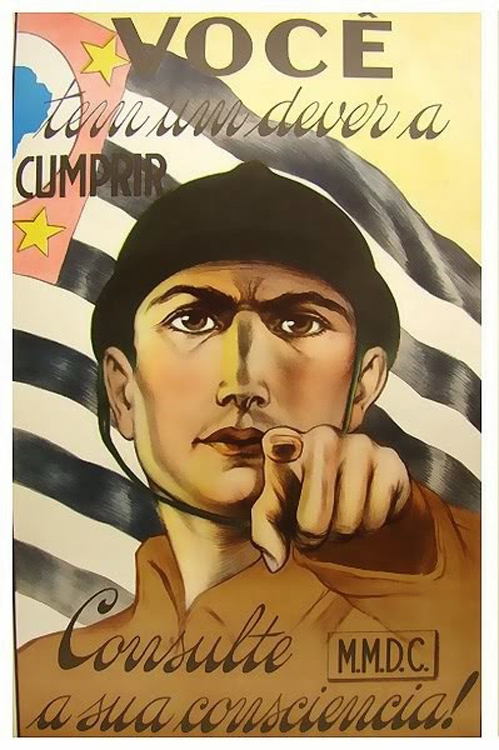
Poster MMDC calling the Paulistas to arms during the Constitutionalist Revolution, in 1932. "You have a duty to fulfill; consult your conscience!"

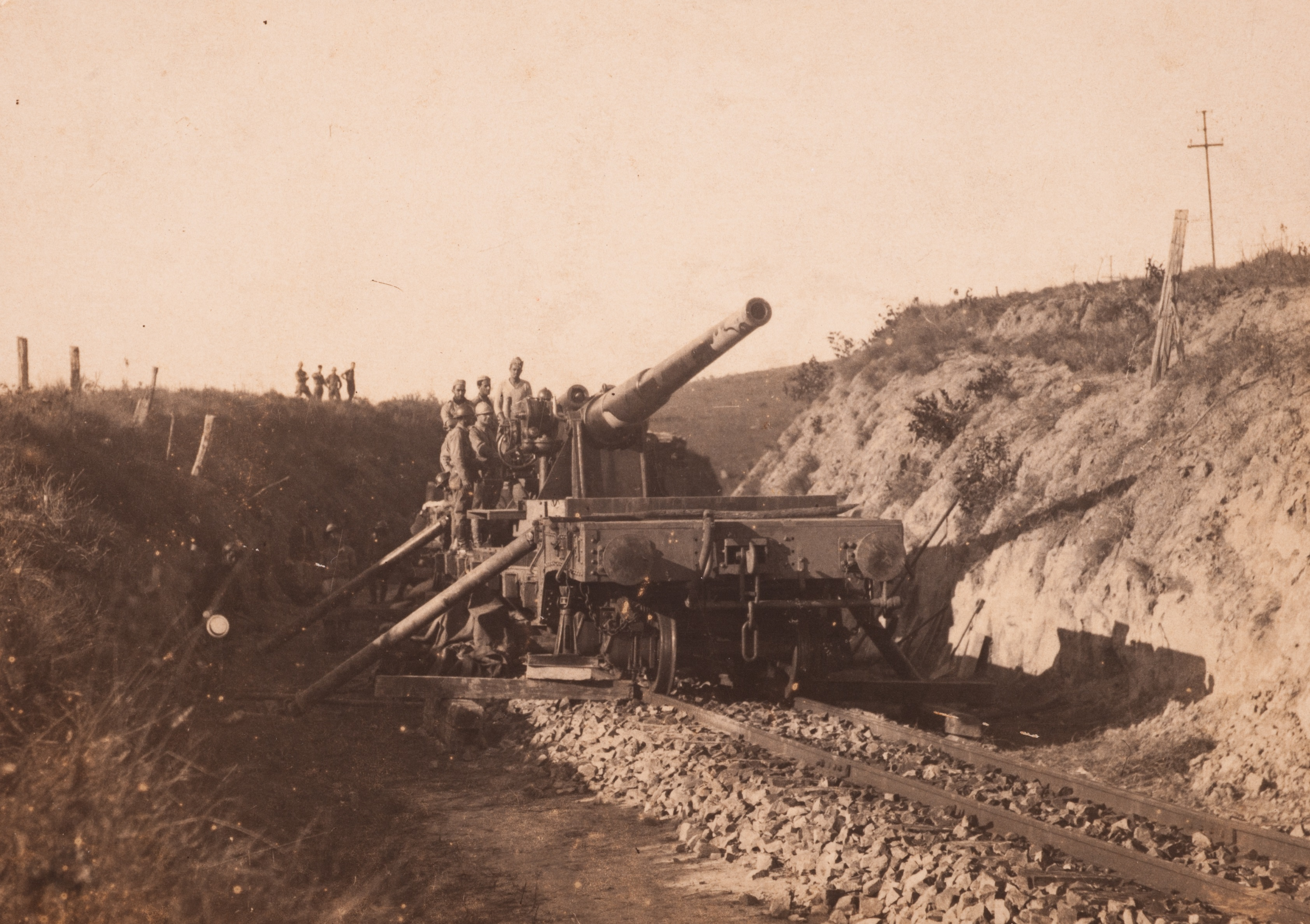
A Schneider-Canet 150mm cannon used during the Paulista War.

The Constitutionalist Revolution of 1932 or Paulista War is the name given to the uprising of the population of the Brazilian state of São Paulo against the federal government of Vargas. Its main goal was to press the provisional government headed by Getúlio Vargas to enact a new Constitution, since it had revoked the previous one, adopted in 1889. However, as the movement developed and resentment against President Vargas grew deeper, it came to advocate the overthrow of the Federal Government and the secession of São Paulo from the Brazilian federation. But, it is noted that the separatist scenario was used as guerrilla tactics by the Federal Government to turn the population of the rest of the country against the state of São Paulo, broadcasting the alleged separatist notion throughout the country. There is no evidence that the movement's commanders sought separatism.

The uprising started on 9 July 1932, after five protesting students were killed by government troops on 23 May 1932. On the wake of their deaths, a movement called MMDC (from the initials of the names of each of the four students killed, Martins, Miragaia, Dráusio and Camargo) started. A fifth victim, Alvarenga, was also shot that night, but died months later.

Revolutionary troops entrenched in the battlefield. In a few months, the state of São Paulo rebelled against the federal government. Counting on the solidarity of three other powerful states, (Rio Grande do Sul, Minas Gerais and Rio de Janeiro), the politicians of São Paulo expected a quick war. However, that solidarity was never translated into actual support, and the São Paulo civil war was won by the Federation on 2 October 1932.

In spite of its military defeat, some of the movement's main demands were finally granted by Vargas afterwards: the appointment of a non-military state Governor, the election of a Constituent Assembly and, finally, the enactment of a new Constitution in 1934. However that Constitution was short lived, as in 1937, amidst growing extremism on the left and right wings of the political spectrum, Vargas closed the National Congress and enacted another Constitution, which established an authoritarian regime called Estado Novo.

=== Late 20th century ===
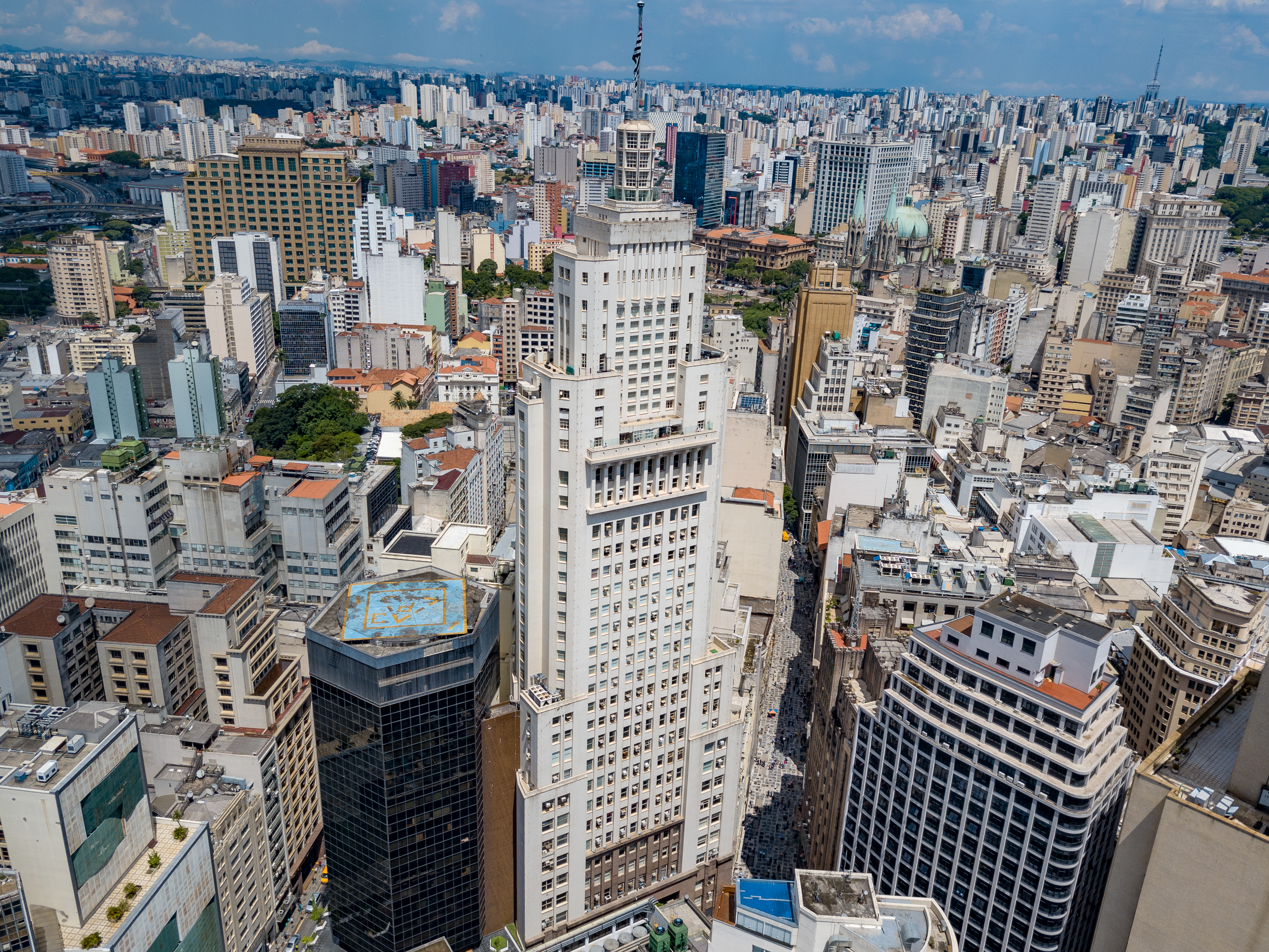
Altino Arantes Building in São Paulo, opened in 1947.

Vargas's rule was a study in political turbulence. Elected in 1934, he ruled by dictatorship (albeit a popular one, thanks to his health and social-welfare programmes) from 1937 to 1945—a period dubbed the "Estado Novo". Thrown out by a coup in 1945, he ran for office again in 1950, and was overwhelmingly elected. On the verge of being overthrown from office again, he committed suicide in 1954. Vargas's main legacy was the centralization of power.

The encouragement of industry and diversification of agriculture, not to mention the abolition of subsidies on coffee, finally did away with the dominance of the coffee oligarchies. His replacement, Juscelino Kubitschek, focused on heavy industry. Kubitschek built car factories, steel plants, hydro-power infrastructure and roads. Petrobras, Brazil's oil monolith, was set up in 1953. By 1958, São Paulo state controlled some 55 percent of Brazil's industrial production, up from 17 percent in 1907. Another of Kubitschek's pet projects was the creation of Brasília, which became Brazil's capital in 1960—the year Kubitschek stepped down. The University of São Paulo was founded in 1934; two years after São Paulo's failed uprising. It has established itself as the most prestigious higher learning institution in the country.

With a transitional government from military to civil and a new currency that made stagnant the economy during the mid- to late 1980s, unemployment and crime became rampant. São Paulo, by now the world's third-largest city after Mexico City and Tokyo, was hard-hit. Wealthy Brazilians retreated to suburban highly secured housing complexes such as Alphaville, and favelas, pockets of substandard living slums that lined the periphery, had a tremendous growth. For the first time in history, Brazil experienced large segments of its population immigrating to continents such as North America, Europe, Australia, and East Asia, particularly to Japan.

== Geography ==
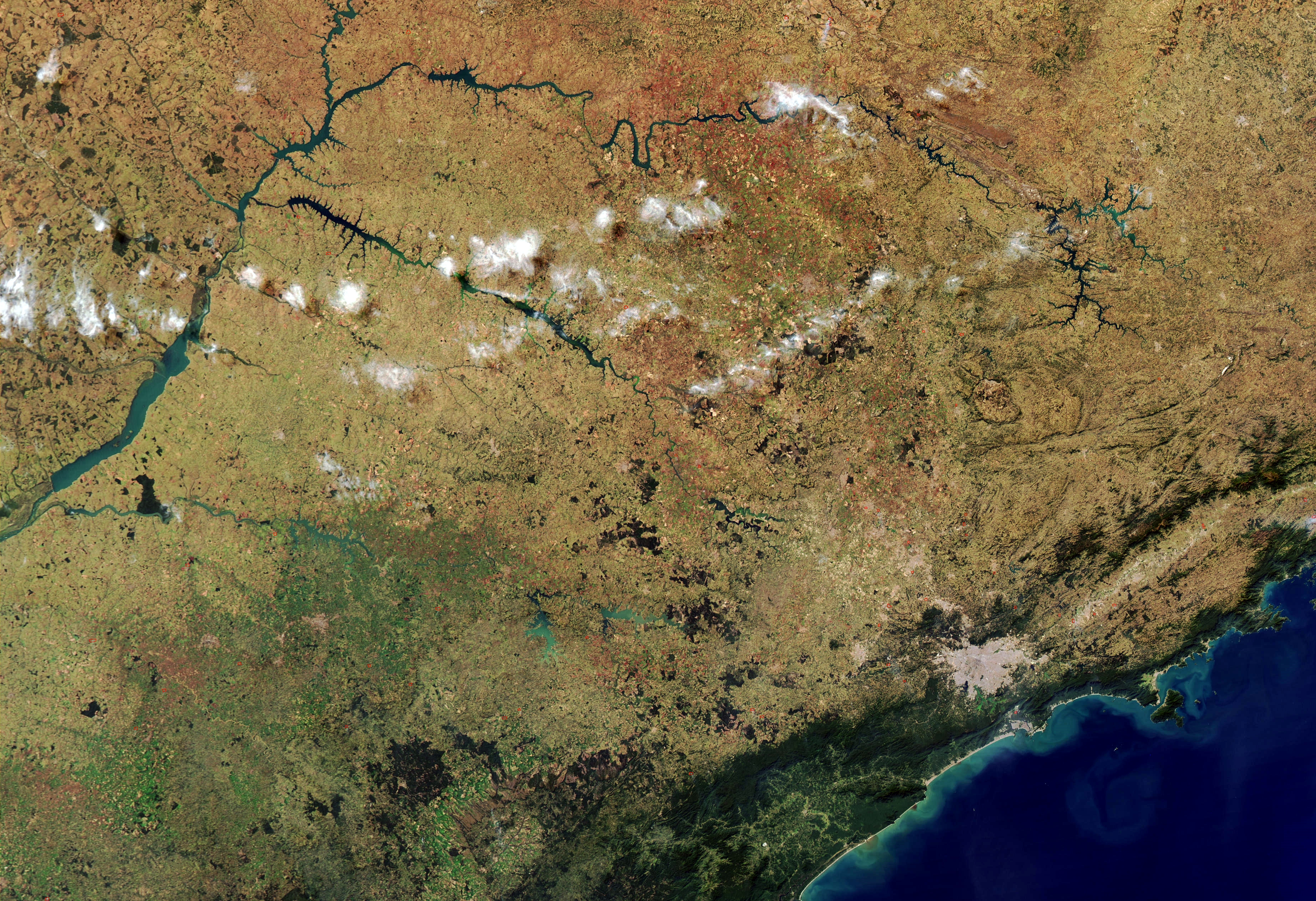
Satellite image showing the state territory

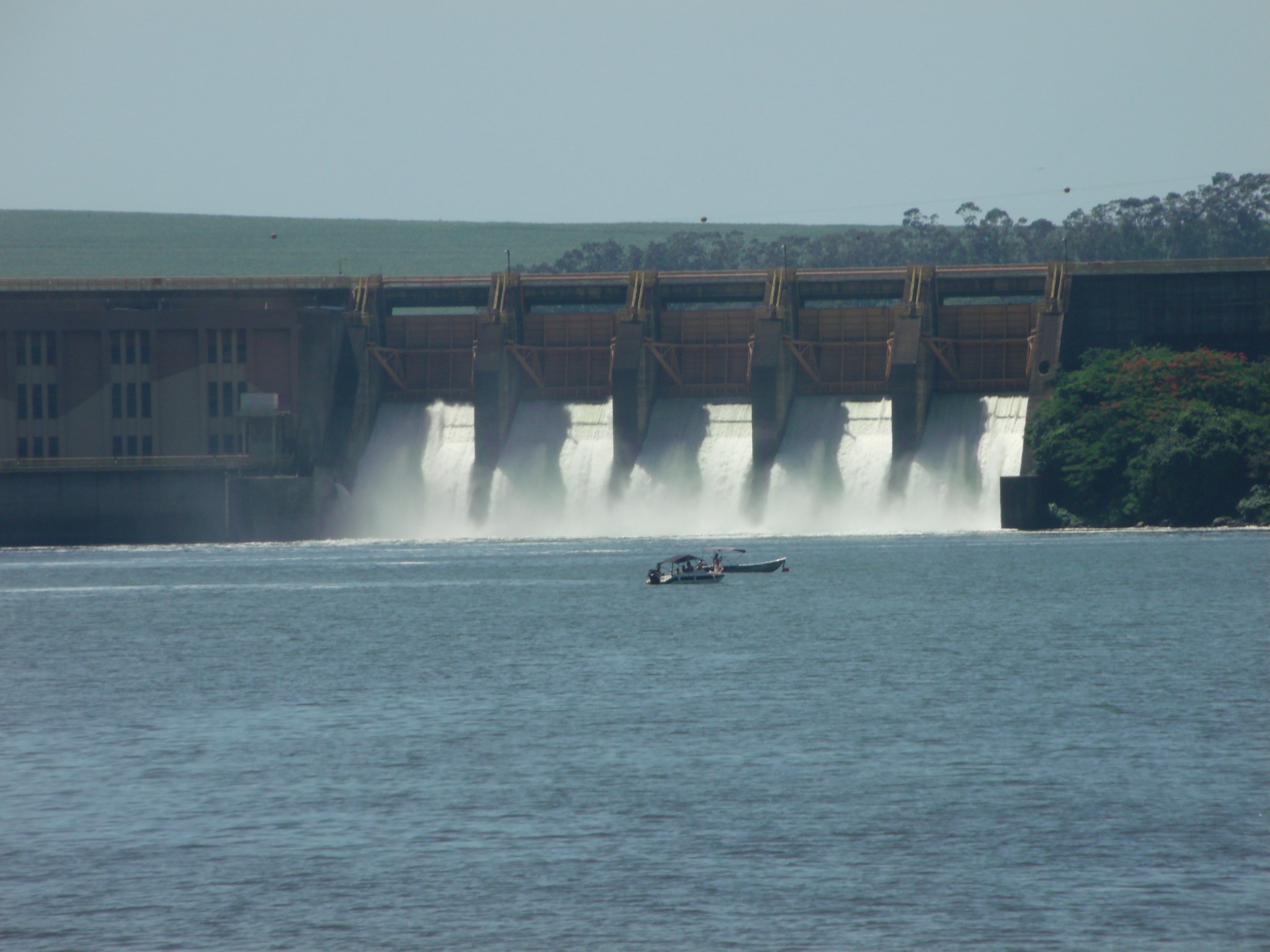
Tiete River in the dam between the towns of Barra Bonita and Igaraçu do Tietê.

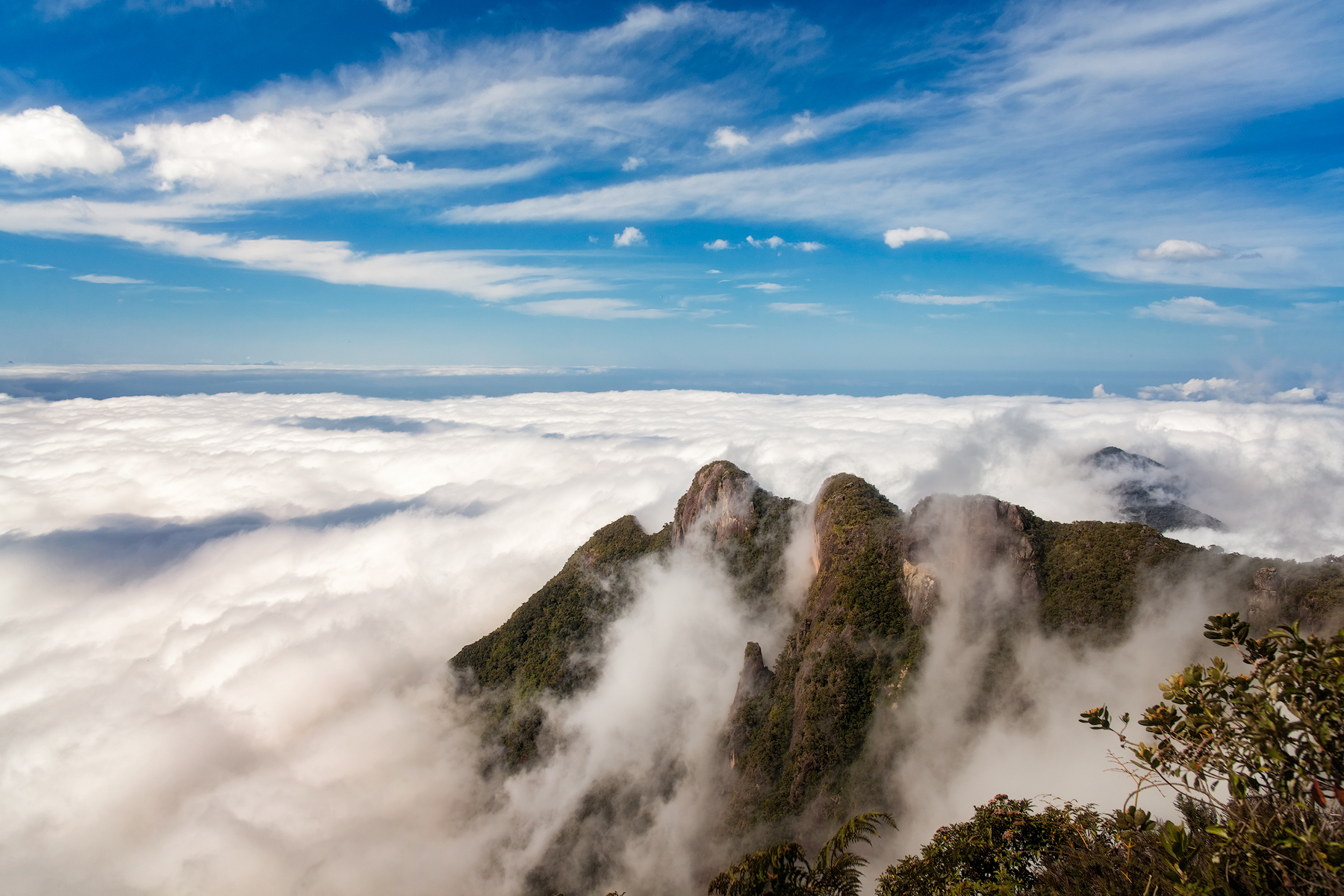
Pedra da Macela in Cunha

São Paulo is one of 27 states of Brazil, located southwest of the Southeast Region. The state area is 248,222.362 km^{2} (95,839.190 sq mi), most of the north of the Tropic of Capricorn, and the 12th unit of the Brazilian federation in area and the second in the Southeast region, behind only Minas Gerais. The state has a relatively high relief, having 85 percent of its surface between three hundred and nine hundred meters above sea level, 8 percent below three hundred meters and 7 percent over nine hundred meters.

The distance between its north and south end points is 611 km (380 mi), and 923 km (574 mi) between the east–west extremes. The state time zone follows the Brasilia time, which is three hours behind Greenwich Mean Time. It is bordered by the states of Minas Gerais to the north and northeast, Paraná to the south, Rio de Janeiro to the east, Mato Grosso do Sul to the west, and the Atlantic Ocean to the southeast.

The coastline consists of plains below 300 metres (980 ft), that border the Serra do Mar. Located in the Serra da Mantiqueira, Mine Stone, with 2,798 metres (9,180 ft) above sea level, is the highest point the state territory and the fifth in the country.

São Paulo has its territory divided into 21 watersheds, inserted in three river basin districts, the largest of which is the Paraná, which covers much of the state territory. Noteworthy is the Rio Grande, which born in Minas Gerais and join with the Paranaiba River to form the Parana River, which separates São Paulo from Mato Grosso do Sul.

Two major tributaries of the left bank of the Paraná River are the Paranapanema River, which is 930 km (580 mi) long and a natural divider between São Paulo and Paraná in most of its course, and the Tiete River, which has a length of 1,136 km (706 mi) and runs through the state territory from southeast to northwest, from its source in Salesópolis, to its mouth in the city of Itapura.

=== Climate ===
Köppen climate types of São Paulo

According to Köppen climate classification, the state territory covers seven distinct climatic types, taking into account the temperature and rainfall.

In the mountains and high altitude areas such as the Serra da Mantiqueira, there are two main climate types: a temperate oceanic climate (Cfb), with cool to mild winters and warm summers with rain all year round, and a subtropical highland climate (Cwb), also with cool to mild winters and warm summers, but with pronounced dry winters. Throughout the year, the average temperature in the hottest month is below 22 °C (72 °F), while the average temperature in the coldest month is below 18 °C (64 °F).

The predominant climate in the southern region of the state and in Greater São Paulo (including the state capital) is the humid subtropical climate (Cfa), with hot summers, mild to cool winters, and rainfall fairly evenly distributed throughout the year.

On the coast, the climate is super-humid tropical type, very similar to the prevailing equatorial climate in the Amazon (Af), with rainfall exceeding sixty monthly millimeters in every month of the year, without the existence of a dry season.

The tropical highland climate (Cwa), predominant in the state territory, specifically in the center of the state, and is characterized by a summer rainy season and a dry season in winter, with temperatures above 22 °C (72 °F) in the hottest month of the year.

In other areas, there is tropical savanna climate (Aw) with rainfall less than 60 millimetres (2.4 in) in one or more months of the year and warmer, with average temperatures above 18 °C (64 °F) during the year. There are also small areas with characteristics of monsoons (Am).

Snow at São Paulo state (Apiaí city) July 1975

The occurrence of snow is very rare, but has been recorded in Campos do Jordão and there are also reports that the phenomenon has occurred in several parts of the south of the state, except for the Ribeira Valley. The frosts are common, especially in higher areas with altitude of 800 metres (2,600 ft).

=== Environment ===
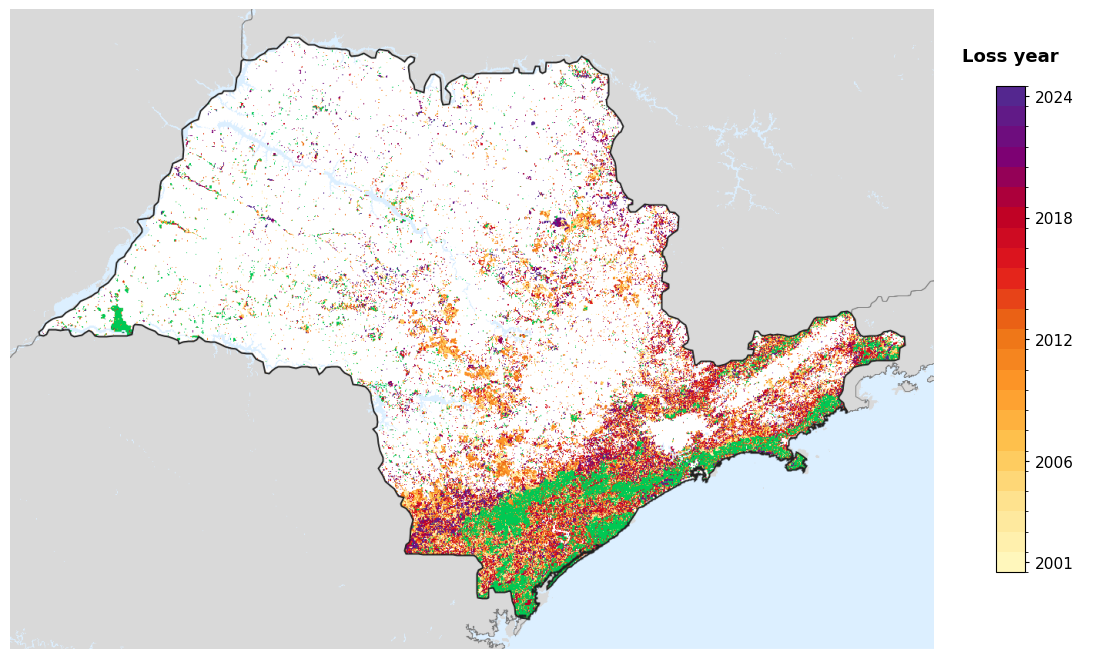
Tree-cover loss year in São Paulo, 2001-2024, from the Global Forest Change dataset.

São Paulo's territory is located, for the most part, in the Atlantic Forest biome, whose initial formation covered just over two thirds of São Paulo's territory and today is only spread out in several fragments, with 32.6% of the original coverage remaining today, most of it on the slopes of Serra do Mar. In the cerrado biome, typical of areas in the center-west of São Paulo, this number is even lower, at just 3%. On the coast there are small areas of dunes, with plant species adapted to heat and salinity, in addition to restingas and mangroves, the latter at the mouths of rivers. As it is located at the junction of the tropical and temperate zones of the planet, São Paulo has its fauna and flora made up of species from both tropical and subtropical regions, some of which are endemic.

In 2020, only 22.9% of São Paulo's territory, or 5,670,532 hectares (ha), were covered by native vegetation, both untouched and in the regeneration stage. That same year, São Paulo had 102 state conservation units and thirteen more federal ones, among areas of environmental protection and relevant ecological interest, ecological stations, national and state forests and parks, wildlife refuges, extractive and sustainable development reserves and also private natural heritage reserves (RPPN).

Conservation units in the state of São Paulo

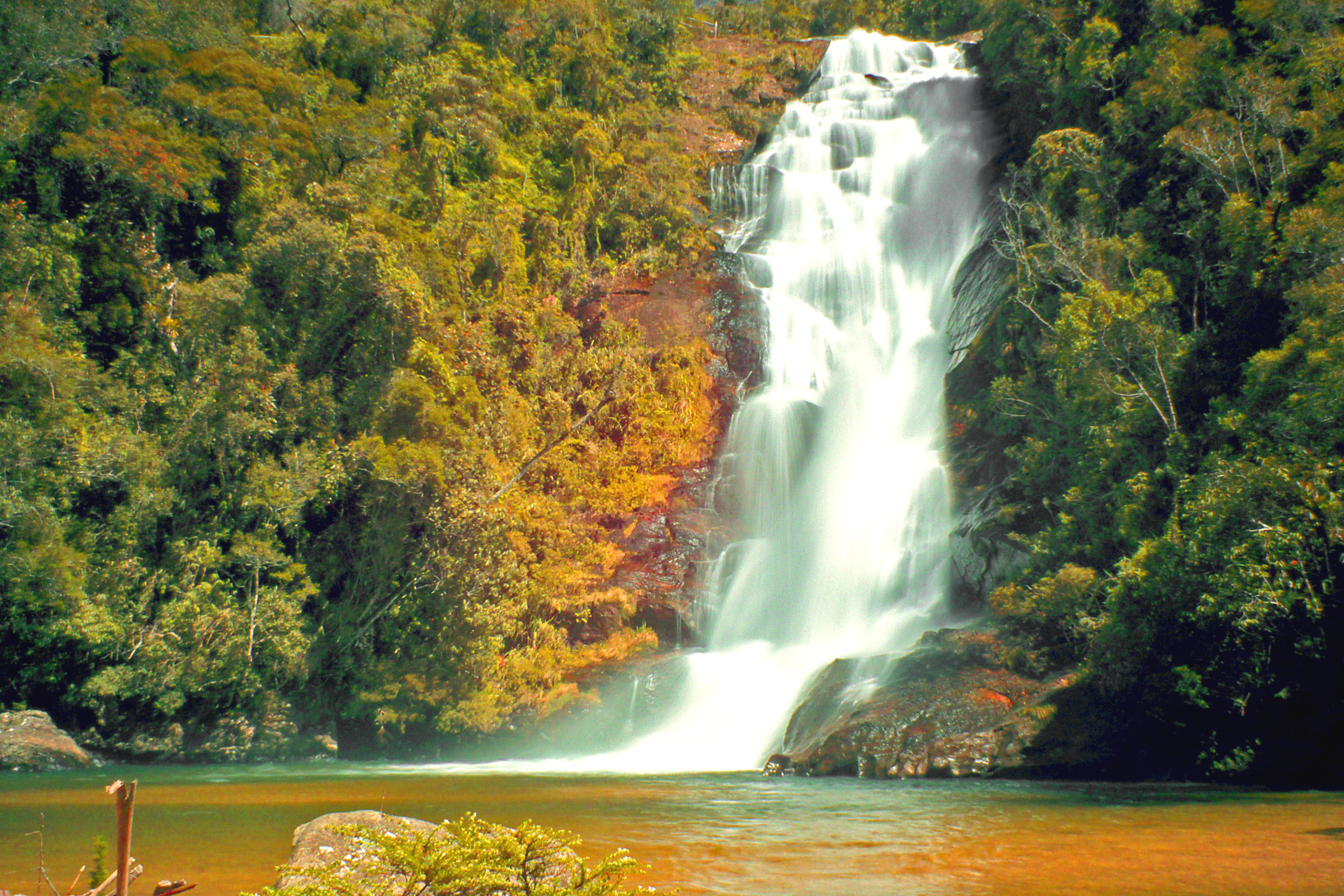
The Santo Isidro Waterfall (in São José do Barreiro) in the Serra da Bocaina National Park, the only national park in the state of São Paulo

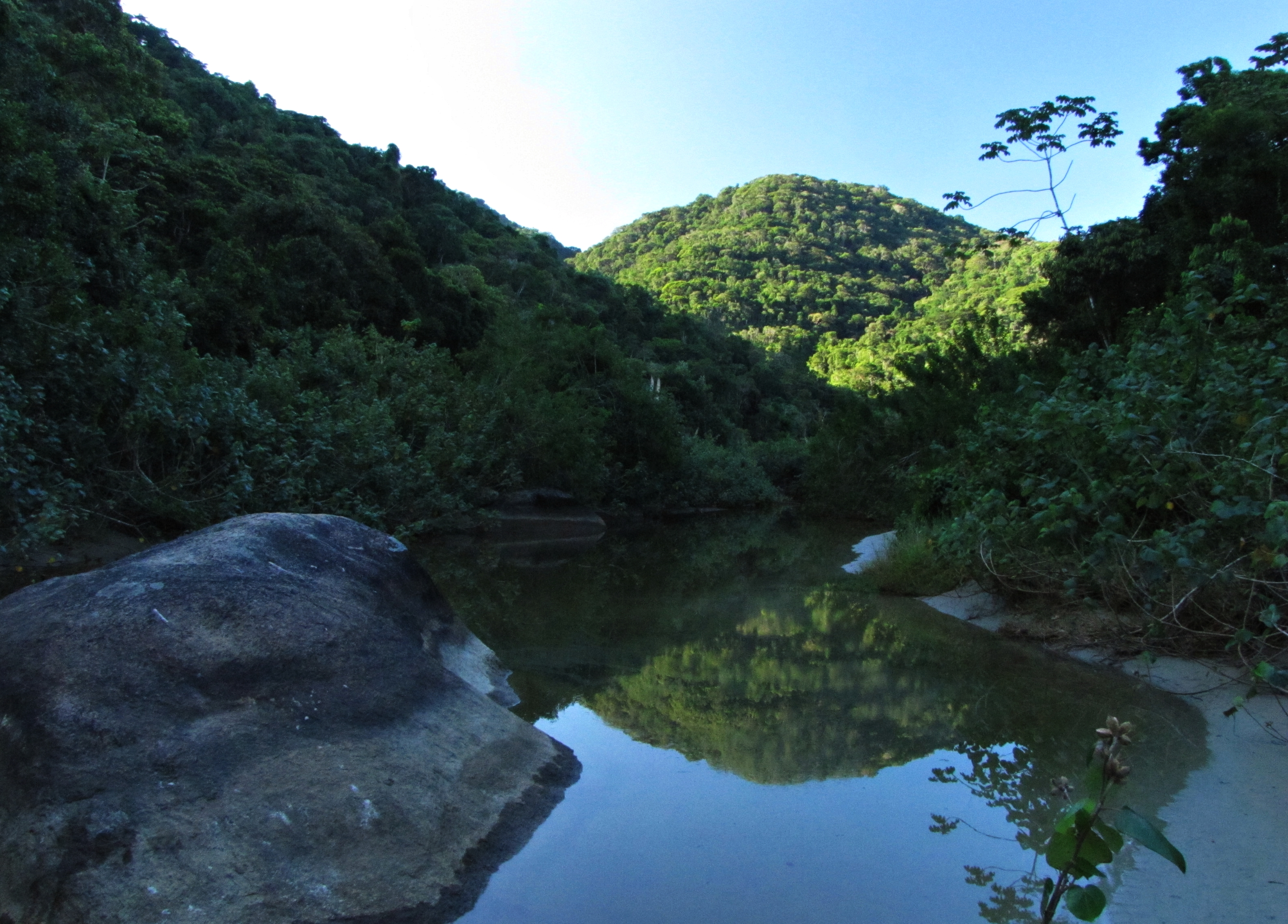
Núcleo Picinguaba, part of the Parque Estadual da Serra do Mar, which contains the largest continuous area of Atlantic Forest preserved in Brazil

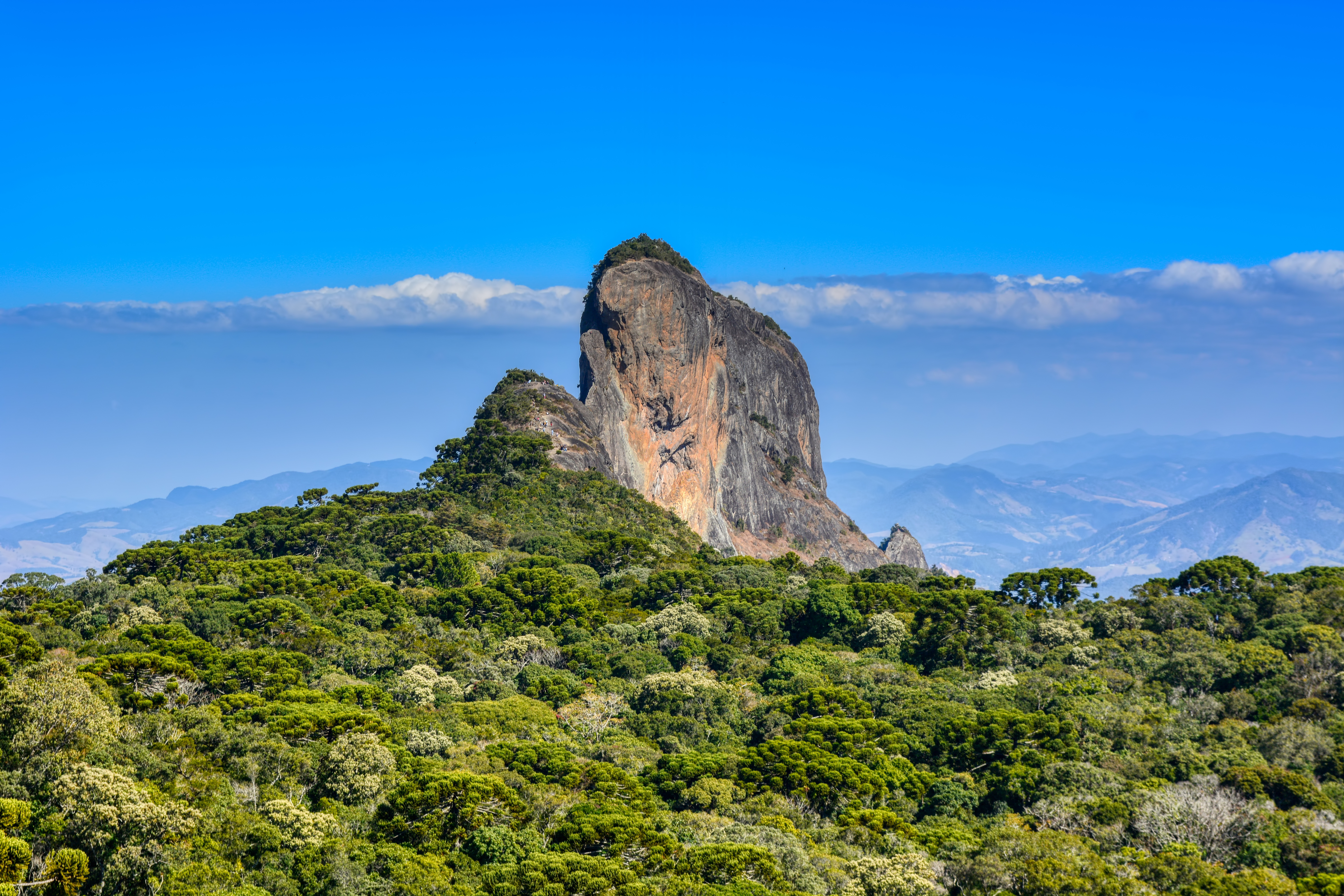
State Natural Monument of Pedra do Baú, part of Serra da Mantiqueira, in São Bento do Sapucaí

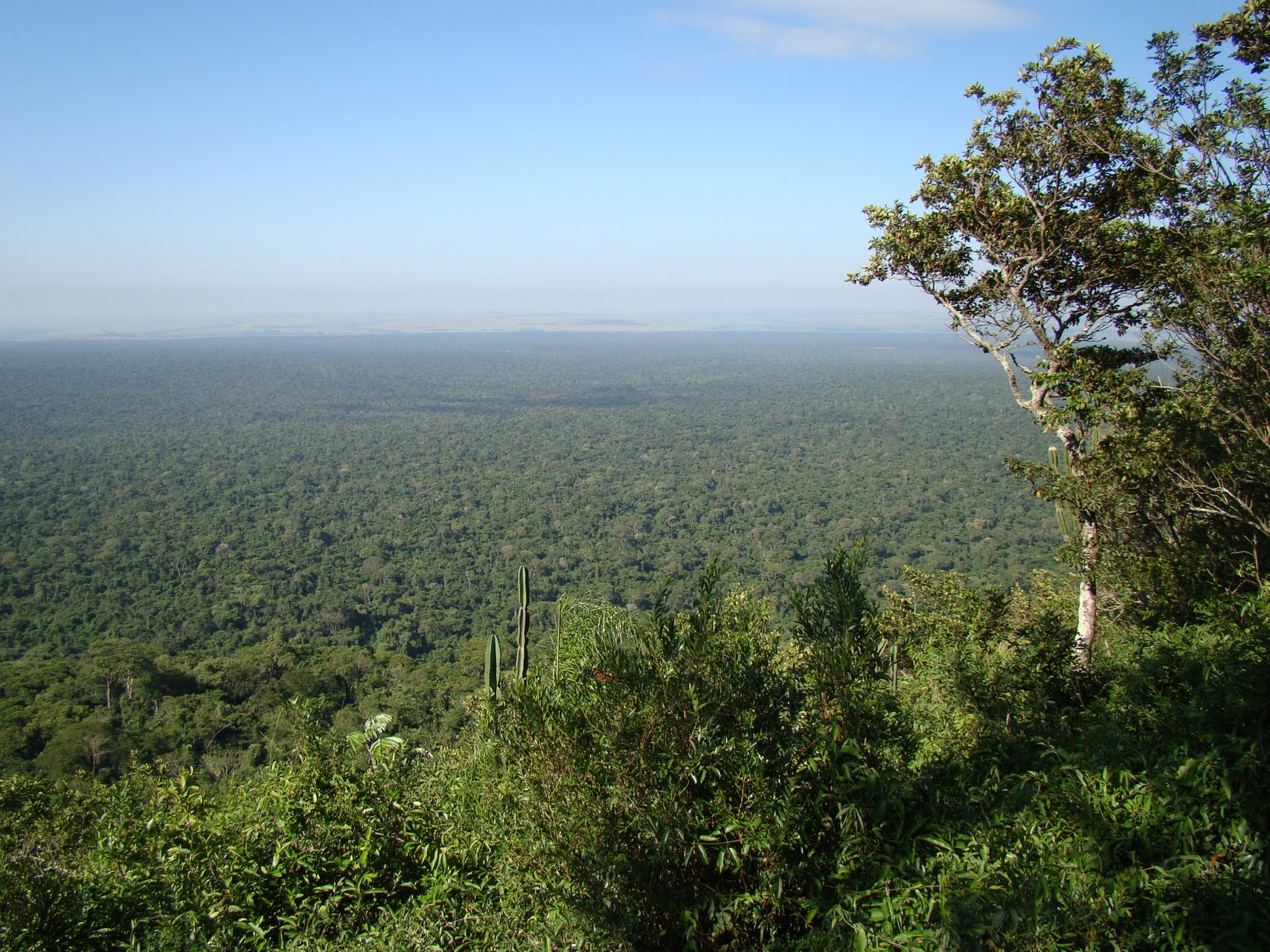
Morro do Diabo State Park, the largest remnant of Atlantic Forest in the west of São Paulo, in the municipality of Teodoro Sampaio

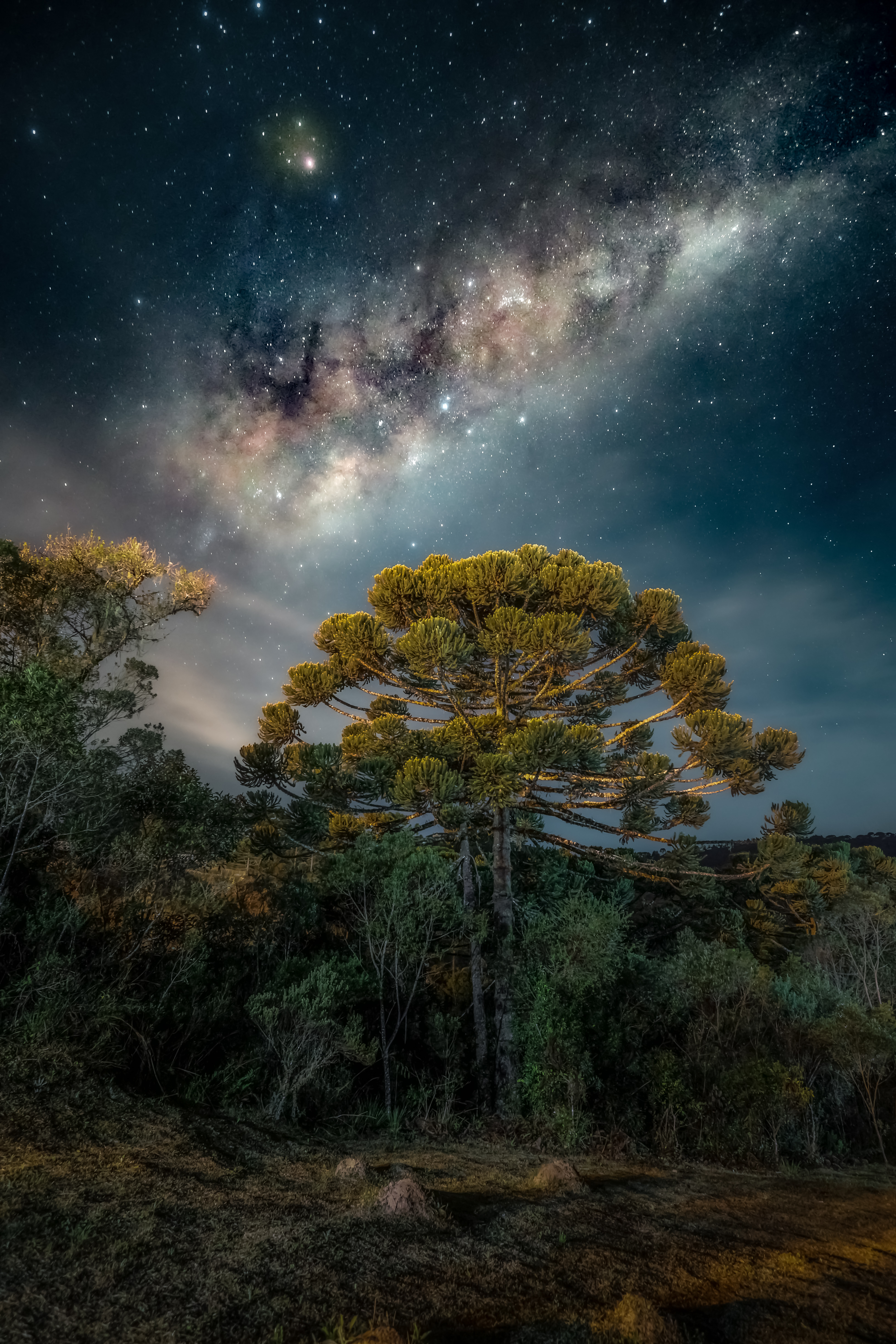
Araucaria forest, with the Milky Way in the background, in the Campos do Jordão State Park, created in 1941

== Demographics ==
Population density in the municipalities of São Paulo in 2002.

According to the IBGE estimates for 2022, there were 44,411,238 people residing in the state. The population density was 177.4 inhabitants per square kilometre (459/sq mi).

Historical population
Year	Pop.	±%
1872	837,354	—
1890	1,384,753	+65.4%
1900	2,282,279	+64.8%
1920	4,592,188	+101.2%
1940	7,180,316	+56.4%
1950	9,134,423	+27.2%
1960	12,974,699	+42.0%
1970	17,958,693	+38.4%
1980	25,375,199	+41.3%
1991	31,546,473	+24.3%
2000	36,969,476	+17.2%
2010	41,262,199	+11.6%
2022	44,411,238	+7.6%

Racial groups of São Paulo (2022 census)
1. White (57.8%)
2. Multiracial (33.0%)
3. African (7.99%)
4. East Asian (1.16%)
5. Indigenous (0.11%)

The 2022 census revealed the following numbers: 25,661,895 White people (57.8%), 14,636,695 Brown (Multiracial) people (33%), 3,546,562 Black people (8%), 513,066 Asian people (1.2%), and 50,528 Amerindian people (0.1%).

People of Italian descent predominate in many towns, including the capital city, where 48 percent of the population has at least one Italian ancestor. The Italians mostly came from Veneto and Campania. There are 32 million descendants of Italians in Brazil, half of whom live in the state of São Paulo. Estimates point to 16 million descendants of Italians in São Paulo, around 35% of the state.

Portuguese and Spanish descendants predominate in most towns. Most of the Portuguese immigrants and settlers came from the Entre-Douro-e-Minho Province in northern Portugal, the Spanish immigrants mostly came from Galicia and Andalusia.

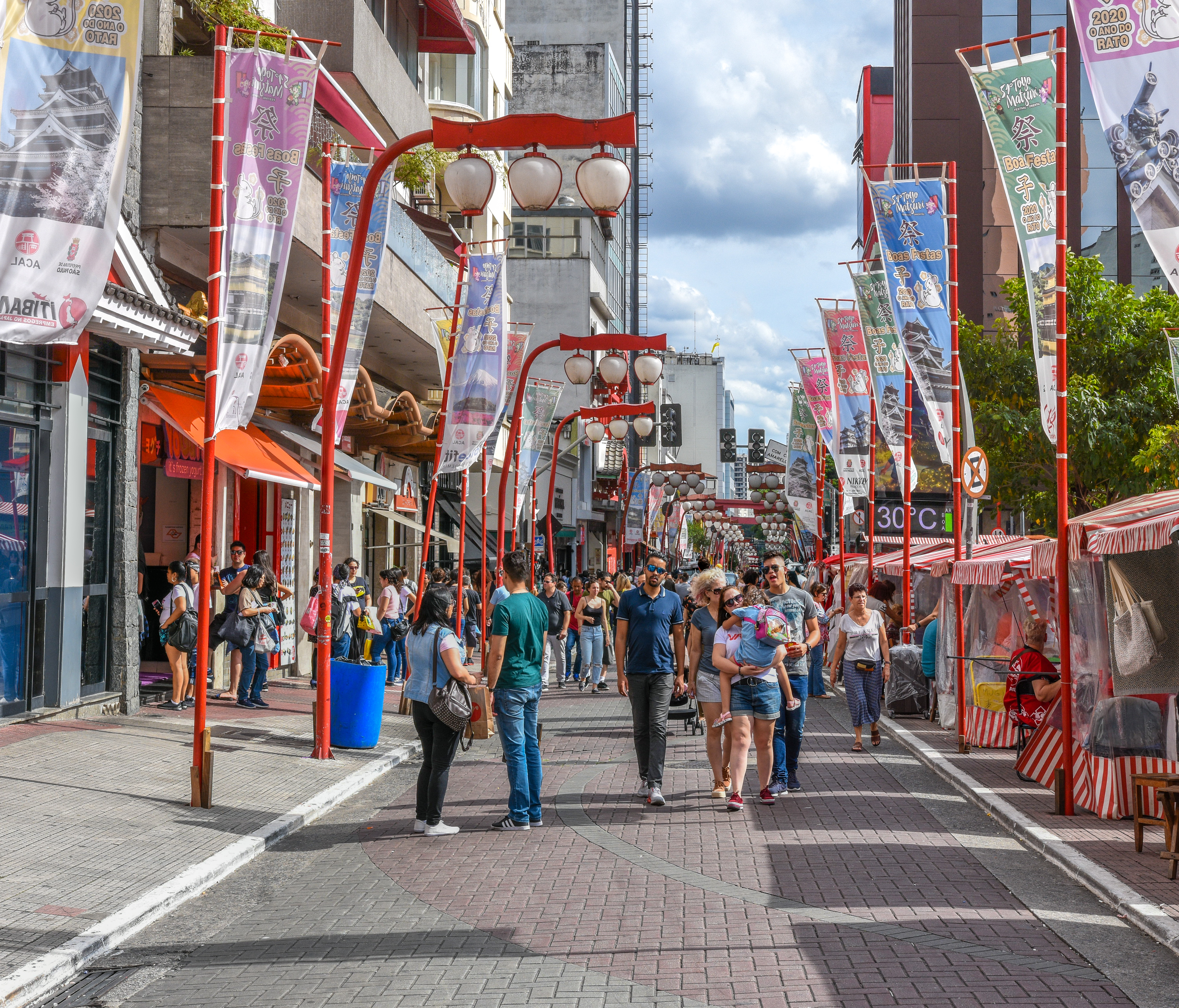
Liberdade district is a Little Tokyo of São Paulo city.

People of African or Mixed background are relatively numerous. São Paulo is also home to the largest Asian population in Brazil, as well to the largest Japanese community outside Japan itself.

There are many people of Levantine descent, mostly Syrian and Lebanese. The majority of Brazilian Jews live in the state, especially in the capital city but there are also communities in Greater São Paulo, Santos, Guarujá, Campinas, Valinhos, Vinhedo, São José dos Campos, Ribeirão Preto, Sorocaba and Itu.

People of more than 70 different nationalities emigrated to Brazil in the past centuries, most of them through the Port of Santos in Santos, São Paulo. Although many of them spread to other areas of Brazil, São Paulo can be considered a true melting-pot. People of German, Hungarian, Lithuanian, Russian, Chinese, Korean, Polish, American, Bolivian, Greek and French background, as well as dozens of other immigrant groups, form sizable groups in the state.

Thousands of Southern refugees from the American Civil War, called Confederados, emigrated to Brazil, with many settling in São Paulo.

According to an autosomal DNA genetic study from 2006, European genes account for 79% of the heritage of the people of São Paulo state, 14% are of African origin, and 7% Native American. A genetic study, from 2013, showed the overall composition of São Paulo to be: 61.9% European, 25.5% African and 11.6% Native American, respectively.

The city of São Paulo, the homonymous state capital, is ranked as the world's 12th largest city and its metropolitan area, with 20 million inhabitants, is the 9th largest in the world and first in the Americas. Regions near the city of São Paulo are also metropolitan areas, such as Campinas, Santos, Sorocaba and São José dos Campos. The total population of these areas coupled with the state capital—the so-called "Expanded Metropolitan Complex of São Paulo"—exceeds 30 million inhabitants, i.e. approximately 75 percent of the population of São Paulo statewide, the first macro-metropolis in the southern hemisphere, joining 65 municipalities that together are home to 12 percent of the Brazilian population.

=== Metropolitan areas and urban agglomerations ===
The Metropolitan Region of São Paulo (RMSP), also known as Greater São Paulo, was established by federal complementary law nº 14 of 1973 and is made up of 39 municipalities in São Paulo, some of them in conurbations with a core city, São Paulo, forming a large continuous urban spot. It is the most populous metropolitan region in Brazil and one of the largest in the world, with an estimated population of approximately 21 million inhabitants in 2022, almost half of the state's population. It is in the RMSP that the municipalities with the highest population density in the state of São Paulo are found: Taboão da Serra (13.416 inhabitants/km^{2}), Diadema (12.795 inhabitants/km^{2}), Osasco (11.445 inhab./km^{2}), Carapicuíba (11.205 inhab./km^{2}), São Caetano do Sul (10.805 inhab./km^{2}), and São Paulo (7.527 inhab./km^{2}).

Largest urban concentrations in São Paulo (state) (2022 census by the Brazilian Institute of Geography and Statistics)
Rank		Pop.	Rank		Pop.
1	São Paulo	20,673,280	11	Franca	397,769
2	Campinas	2,093,118	12	Bauru	394,254
3	Baixada Santista	1,672,991	13	Presidente Prudente	357,402
4	São José dos Campos	1,589,875	14	Caraguatatuba–Ubatuba–São Sebastião	344,383
5	Sorocaba	945,097	15	Limeira	313,836
6	Ribeirão Preto	861 177	16	Itu–Salto	302,559
7	Jundiaí	843,633	17	Araraquara	296,196
8	São José do Rio Preto	660,744	18	São Carlos	287,035
9	Americana–Santa Bárbara d'Oeste	482,606	19	Mogi Guaçu–Mogi Mirim	257,511
10	Piracicaba	478,347	20	Indaiatuba	255,748

=== Religion ===
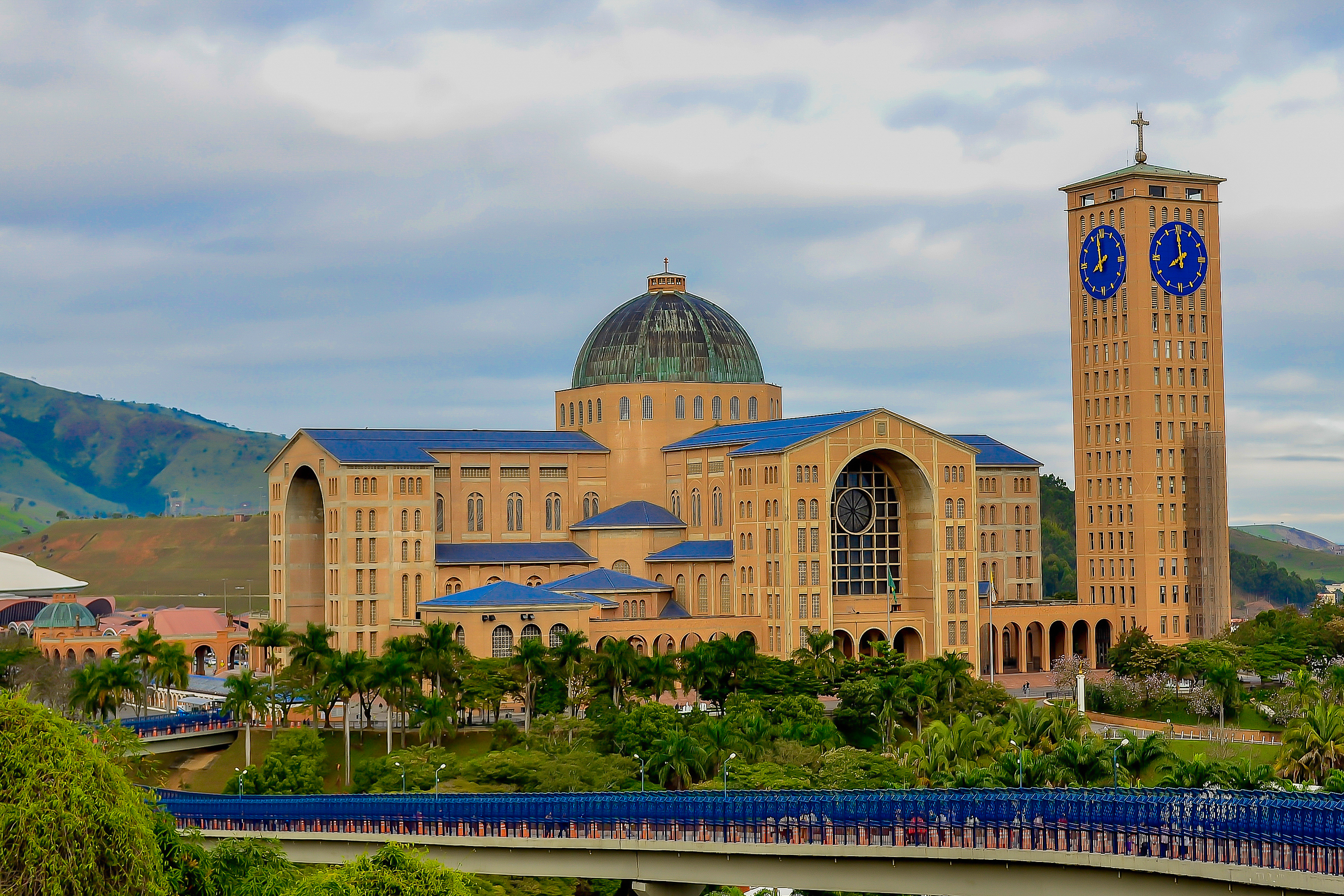
The Basilica of Our Lady of Aparecida is the second largest Catholic church in the world in interior area after the St. Peter's Basilica in the Vatican City.

Religion in São Paulo (2010)
1. Catholic Church (60.1%)
2. Protestantism (24.1%)
3. Spiritism (3.29%)
4. Other religions (4.43%)
5. Irreligious (8.14%)

According to the 2010 demographic census, of the total population of the state, there were 24 781 288 Roman Catholics (60.06%), 9 937 853 Protestants or evangelicals (24.08%), 1 356 193 spiritists (3.29%), 444 968 Jehovah's Witnesses (1.08%), 153 564 Buddhists (0.37%), 141 553 Umbanda and Candomblecists (0.34%), 81 810 Brazilian Catholic Apostolic Church (0.20%), 70 856 new Eastern religious (0.17%), 65 556 Mormons (0.16%), 51 050, Jewish (0.12%), 31 618 Orthodox Christians (0.08%), 20 375 spiritualists (0.05%), Esoteric 17 827 (0.04%), 14 778 Islamic (0.04%), 4,591 belonging to indigenous traditions (0.01%) and 1,822 Hindus (0.00%). There were still 3 357 682 people without religion (8.14%), 214 332 with indeterminate religion or multiple membership (0.52%), 50 153 did not know (0.12%) and 18 038 did not declare (0.04%).

=== Crime ===
São Paulo, as well as other states of Brazil, has two types of police forces to carry out public safety in their territory, the Military Police of São Paulo State (PMESP), the largest police in Brazil and the third largest in Latin America, with 138,000 soldiers, and the Civil Police of the State of São Paulo, which exercises judicial police function and is subordinate to the state government.

According to data from the "Map of Violence 2011", published by the Sangari Institute and the Ministry of Justice, the homicide rate per 100,000 inhabitants in the state of São Paulo is the lowest in Brazil. The number of homicides in São Paulo fell from 39.7 to 10.1 per 100,000 inhabitants between 1998 and 2014. The state, which occupied the 5th place among the most violent states in the country in 1998, then came to occupy the 27th position in 2016.

In 2019, according to data from the Public Security Secretariat, the state reached a rate of 6.27 homicides per 100 thousand inhabitants, a special reduction compared to the number recorded in 1999, which was 35.27 homicides per 100 thousand inhabitants. The state's current homicide rate is below what is considered bearable by the World Health Organization, which is below homicides per 100,000 inhabitants (2023). Other crime rates also fell during the period studied, such as rape, which saw a large reduction.

According to the 2022 Brazilian Security Yearbook, São Paulo has the lowest rate of violent deaths recorded in the country, having 7 of the 10 least violent cities in Brazil.

=== Health ===
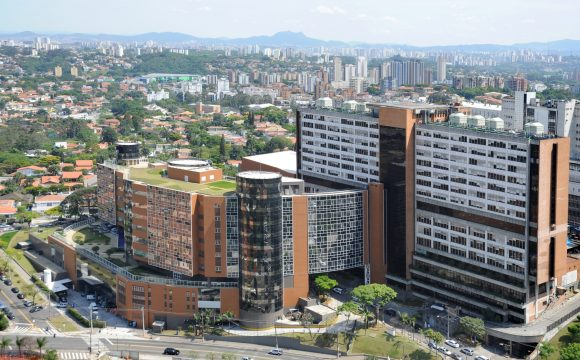
Hospital Albert Einstein, considered the best hospital in Latin America and one of the top in the world

The state of São Paulo is the country's main health hub, while its capital, the city of São Paulo, has established itself as the Latin American health capital, being the one that receives the most foreigners in search of medical treatments and diagnoses. The city receives patients from all over the world. The first healthcare institution outside the US to receive Joint Commission International (JCI) accreditation was the Albert Einstein hospital.

According to a survey carried out by IBGE in 2013, 71.8% of the population of São Paulo evaluates their health as good or very good — placing the State among those with the highest proportions of people who declared a positive self-rated health; the national average was 66.1%. In 2008, 72.7% of the population reported having regular medical appointments; 45.2% of the inhabitants consult the dentist regularly and 6.5% of the population was admitted to a hospital bed in the last twelve months. 33.7% of the inhabitants reported having a chronic illness and only 40.1% had health insurance. Another significant fact is the fact that 28.9% of the inhabitants declare that they always need the Family Health Unit Program — PUSF.

Regarding female health, 49.7% of women over 40 years of age had a clinical breast exam in the last twelve months; 64.9% of women between 50 and 69 years old had a mammography in the last two years; and 84.4% of women aged 25 to 59 had a cervical cancer screening in the last three years. More recent data from 2012 shows that the birth rate in the state of São Paulo was 14.71 per thousand inhabitants and the mortality rate was 13.17 per thousand live births, one of the lowest in the country.

=== Education and science ===
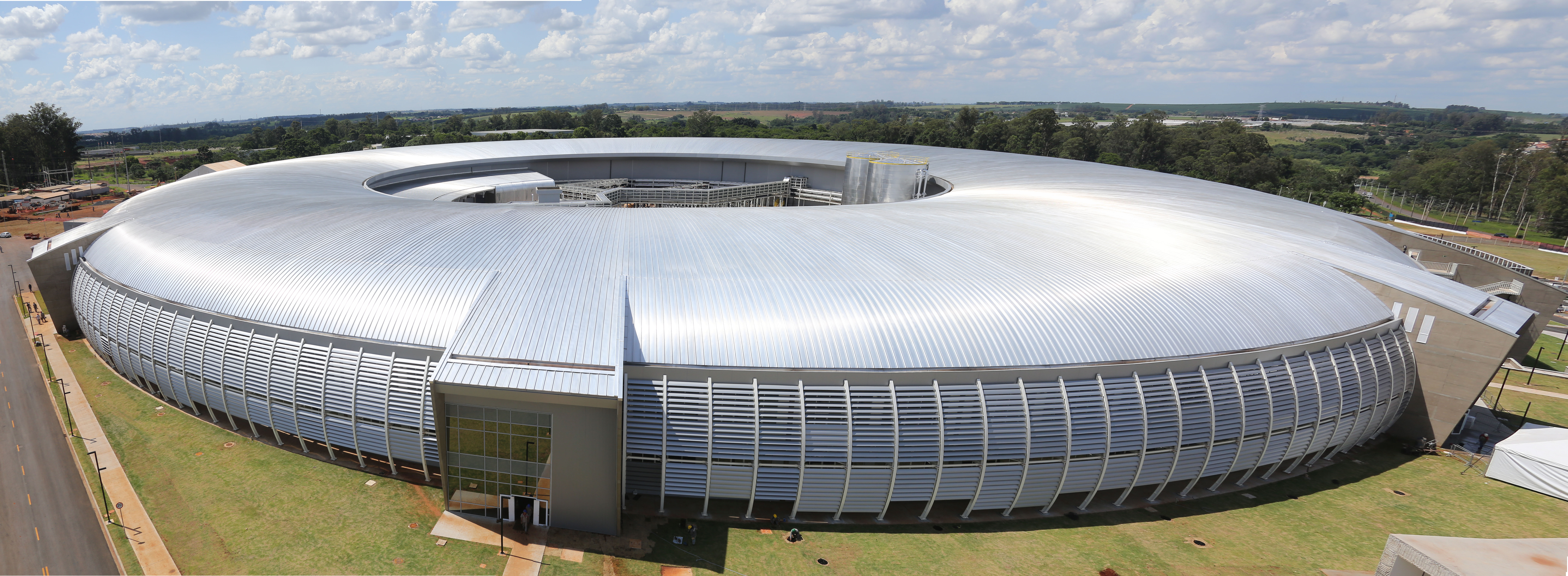
The Sirius particle accelerator building of Laboratório Nacional de Luz Síncrotron in Campinas, the only particle accelerator of this size in Latin America and the second in the world

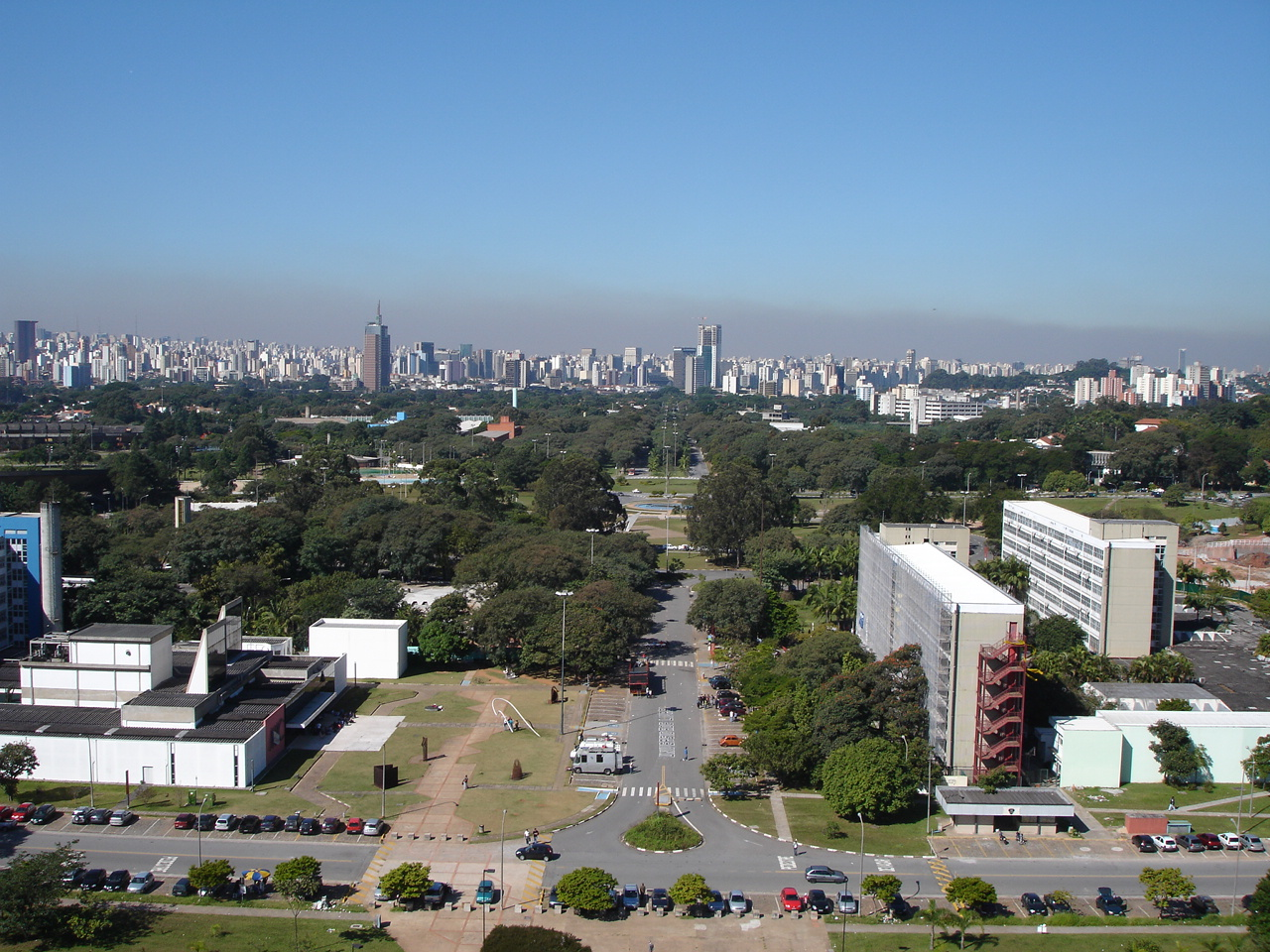
Aerial view of University of São Paulo in São Paulo, one of the world's renowned university centers

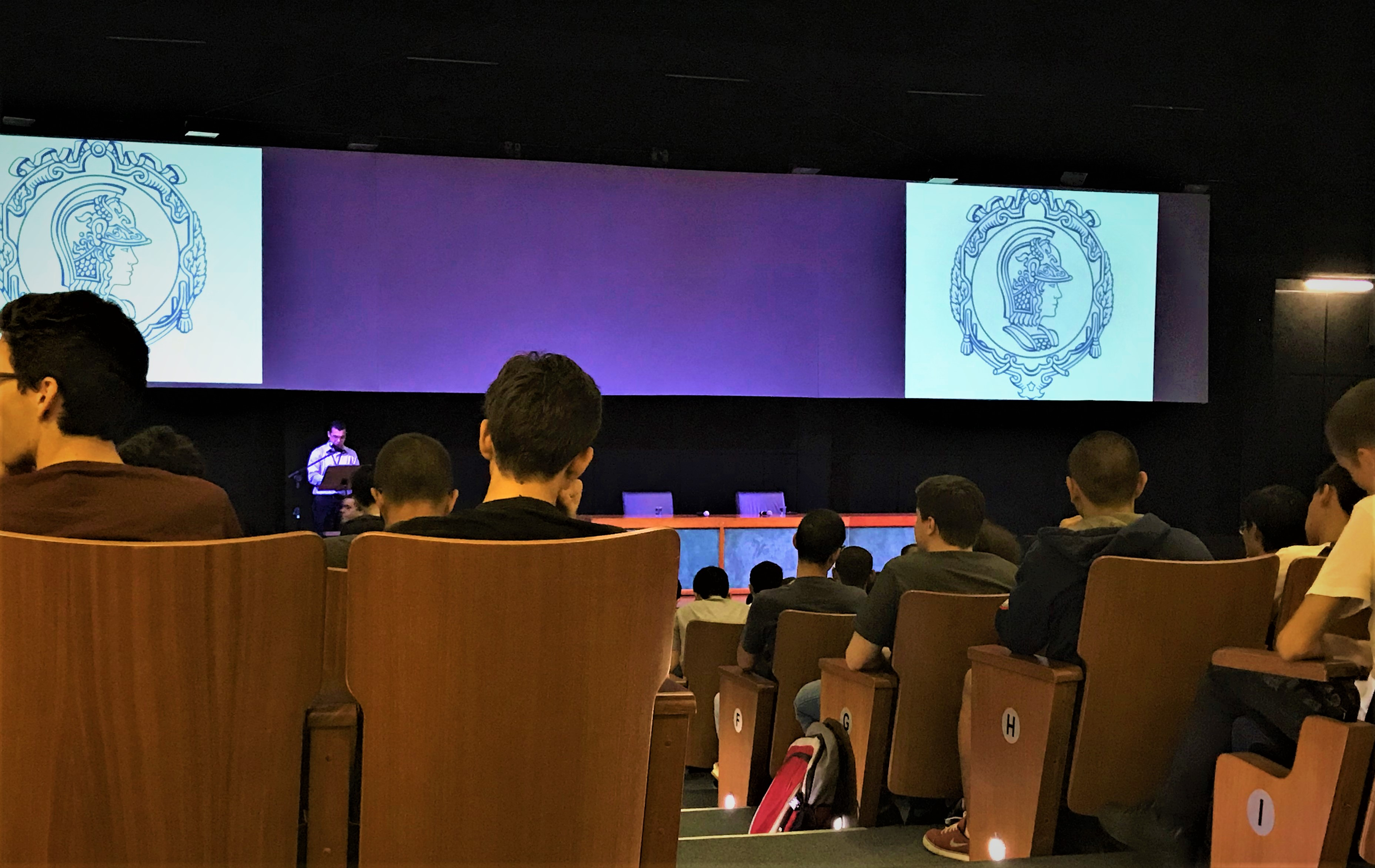
Admission ceremony of Polytechnic School of the University of São Paulo.

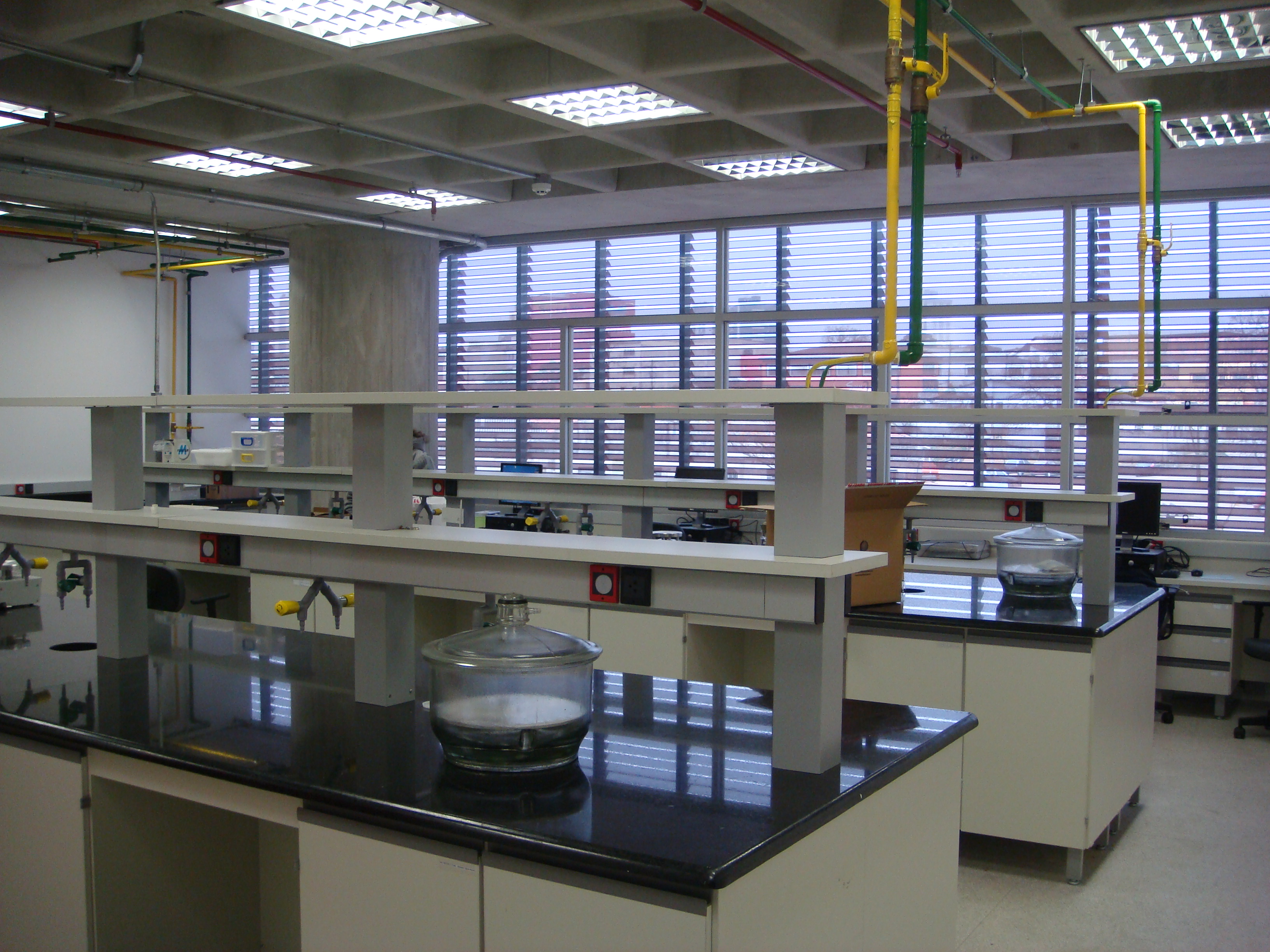
Teaching laboratory of Universidade Federal do ABC in Santo André.

Covered by a significant number of renowned educational institutions and centers of excellence, São Paulo is the largest research and development hub in Brazil, responsible for 52% of Brazilian scientific production and 0.7% of world production in the period between 1998 and 2002. Its capital is one of the world's main high-impact science centers. The illiteracy rate indicated by the last IBGE demographic census in 2022 was 2.2%, the 3rd lowest in the country, alongside Santa Catarina. The functional illiteracy rate was 13.2% in 2010. With 15.027 primary schools, 12.539 pre-school units, 5.639 secondary schools and more than 578 universities, the state's education network is the largest in the country.

The HDI education factor in the state in 2005 reached the mark of 0.921 - a very high level, in accordance with the standards of the United Nations Development Program (UNDP).

Among the many higher education institutions, the University of São Paulo (USP) stands out, classified as the best in Latin America and frequently cited among the best universities in the world, reaching 22nd position in 2021; the State University of Campinas (UNICAMP), the largest producer of research patents in Brazil; the São Paulo State University (UNESP), the 485th best university on the planet and the 16th best in Latin America. The three universities, all maintained by the São Paulo government, are maintained by around 10% state revenue from the Tax on Circulation of Goods and Services (ICMS) and by funds from public institutions that promote research, with emphasis on the Fundação de Amparo to Pesquisa do Estado de São Paulo (FAPESP) and the National Council for Scientific and Technological Development (formerly the National Research Council, whose acronym, CNPq, was maintained).

Among those maintained by the federal government, the Federal University of São Carlos (UFSCar), Federal University of São Paulo (UNIFESP), the Federal University of ABC (UFABC) and the Technological Institute of Aeronautics (ITA), the latter a center reference in engineering education. The state also has private universities of great national and international reputation, such as the Pontifical Catholic University of São Paulo (PUC-SP), the Universidade Presbiteriana Mackenzie, the Escola Superior de Propaganda e Marketing (ESPM), the Armando Alvares Penteado Foundation (FAAP ) and the Education and Research Institute (INSPER).

In addition to many universities, in the field of science and technology, São Paulo has important research institutes, including: Institute for Technological Research (IPT), Institute for Energy and Nuclear Research (IPEN), Butantan Institute, Biological Institute, Pasteur Institute, the Institute of Medicine Tropical (IMTSP), Forestry Institute, National Institute for Space Research (INPE), National Synchrotron Light Laboratory (LNS) and Agronomic Institute of Campinas (IAC).

==== Educational institutions ====
- Instituto de Pesquisas Energéticas e Nucleares (IPEN) (Nuclear and Energy Research Institute, Public);
- Instituto Tecnológico da Aeronáutica (ITA) (Air Force Technological Institute, Public);
- Universidade de São Paulo (USP) (University of São Paulo, Public);
- Universidade Federal de São Paulo (Unifesp) (Federal University of São Paulo, Public);
- Universidade Estadual Paulista (Unesp) (São Paulo State University, Public);
- Universidade Estadual de Campinas (Unicamp) (University of Campinas, Public);
- Universidade Federal de São Carlos (UFSCar) (Federal University of São Carlos, Public);
- Instituto Federal de Educação, Ciência e Tecnologia de São Paulo (IFSP) (São Paulo Federal Institute of Education, Science and Technology, Public);
- Instituto Mauá de Tecnologia (Mauá) (Mauá Institute of Technology, Private);
- Pontifícia Universidade Católica de São Paulo (PUC-SP) (Pontifical Catholic University of São Paulo, Private);
- Universidade Presbiteriana Mackenzie (Mackenzie) (Mackenzie Presbyterian University, Private);
- Universidade de Sorocaba (UNISO) (University of Sorocaba, Private)
- Fundação Getúlio Vargas (FGV) (Getúlio Vargas Foundation, Private);
- Pontifícia Universidade Católica de Campinas (Pontifical Catholic University of Campinas, Private);
- Universidade Federal do ABC (UFABC) (Federal University of ABC, Public);
- Faculdade de Medicina de Marília (FAMEMA) (Marília Faculty of Medicine, Public);
- Faculdade de Medicina de São José do Rio Preto (FAMERP) (São José do Rio Preto Faculty of Medicine, Public);
- Universidade Metodista de São Paulo (UMESP) (Methodist University of São Paulo, Private);
- Faculdade de Teologia Metodista Livre (FTML) (Free Methodist College, Private);
- Faculdade de Tecnologia do Estado de São Paulo (FATEC) (São Paulo State Technological College, Public);
- Universidade de Ribeirão Preto (UNAERP) (Ribeirão Preto, Private);
- Universidade de Marília (UNIMAR) (Marília, Private);
- Universidade Paulista (UNIP) (Private)

== Government and politics ==
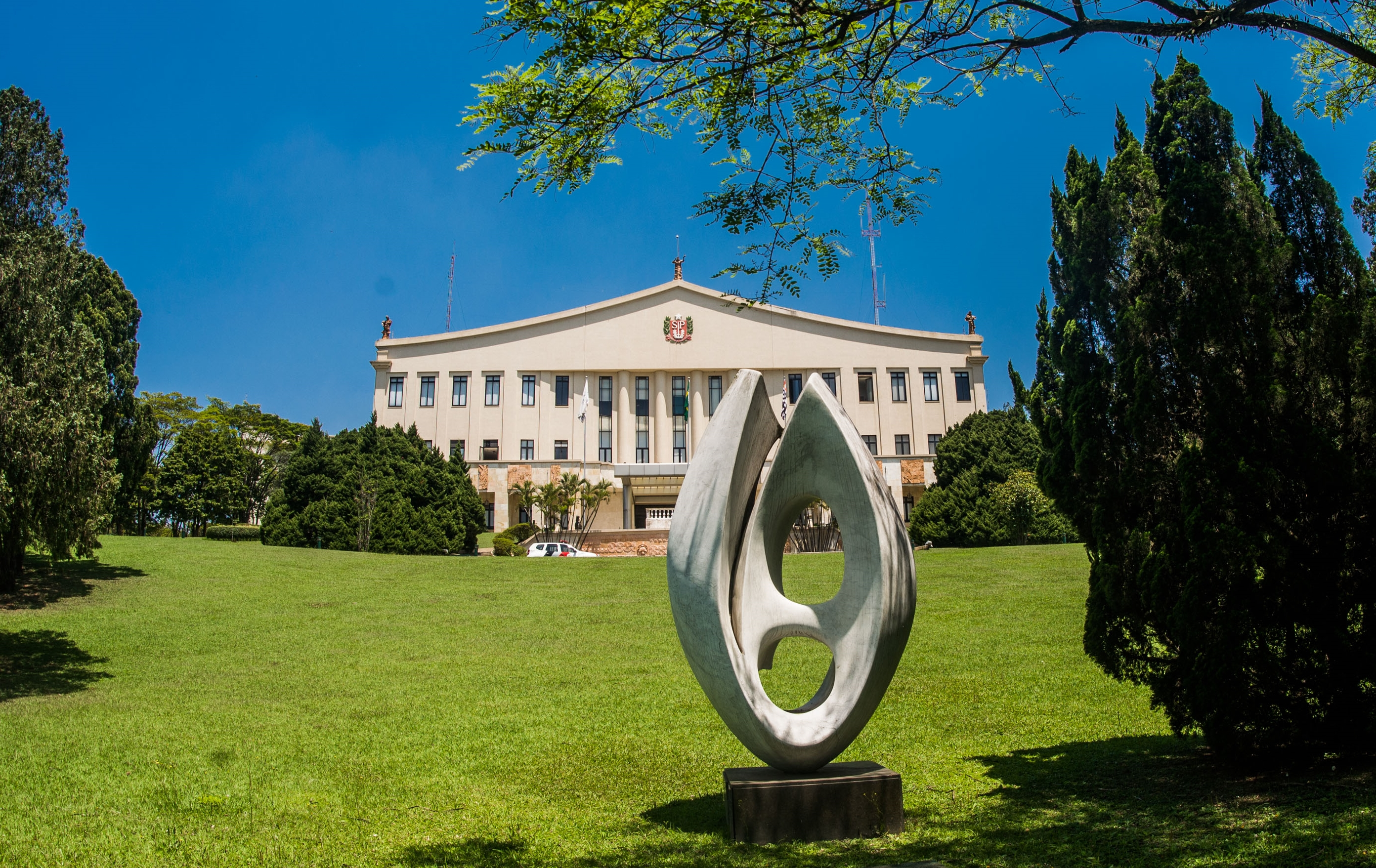
Palácio dos Bandeirantes, the seat of state government

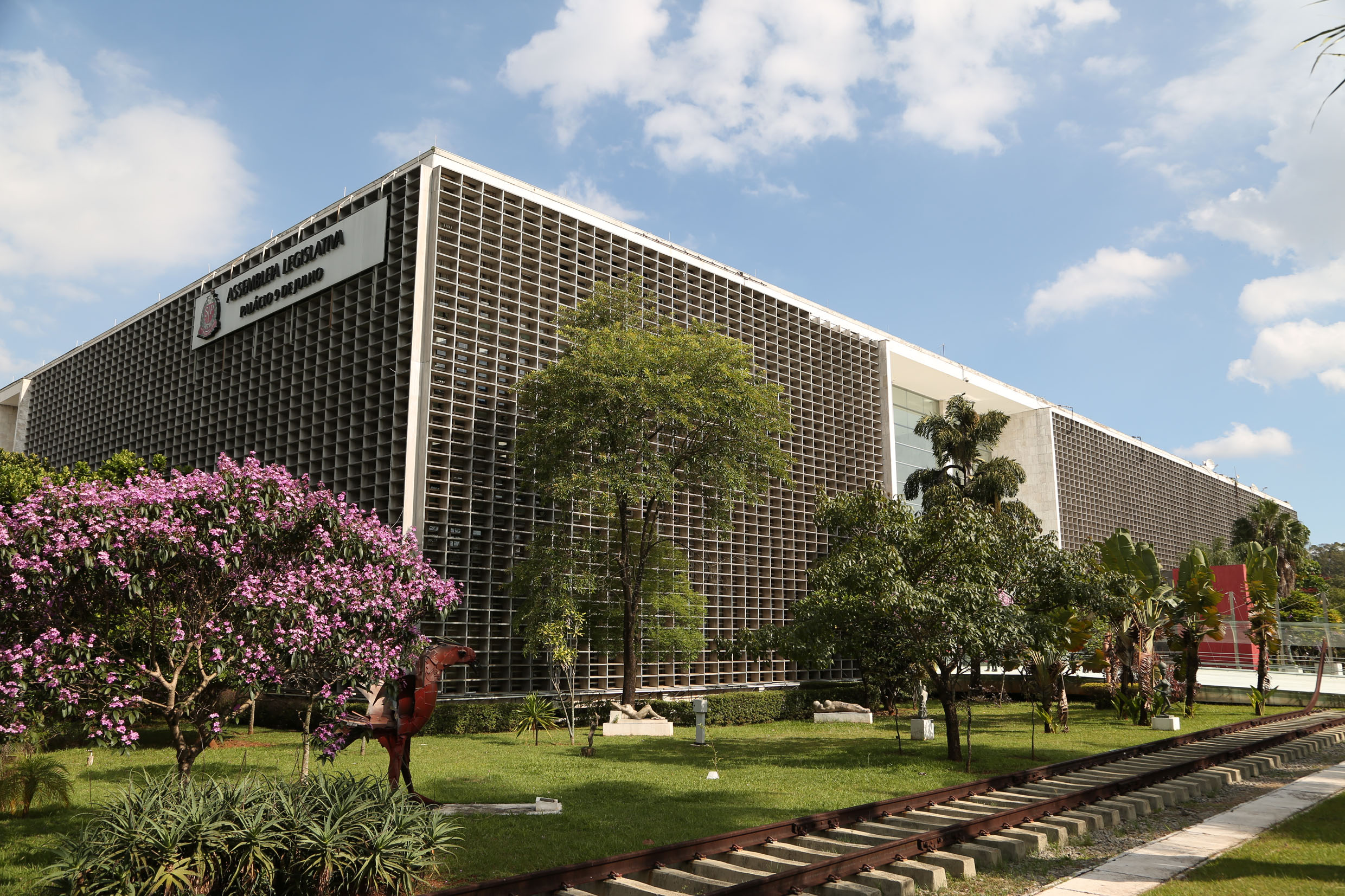
Legislative Assembly of São Paulo

The Brazilian Social Democracy Party (PSDB) held the governorship and the speakership of the state' Legislative Assembly from 1994 to 2022, when governor Rodrigo Garcia, lost the election to Tarcisio de Freitas (Republicanos). Local politicians of note (with party affiliations) include: former President of Brazil (1994–2002) Fernando Henrique Cardoso (PSDB), former president (2002–2010) Luiz Inácio Lula da Silva (PT), José Serra (PSDB), Geraldo Alckmin (PSB), Mário Covas (PSDB), Antonio Palocci (PT), Eduardo Suplicy (PT), Aloizio Mercadante (PT), Marta Suplicy (MDB), Gilberto Kassab (PSD), and Paulo Maluf (PP).

Three of last four Brazilian presidents, Fernando Henrique Cardoso (PSDB), Luiz Inácio Lula da Silva (PT) and Michel Temer (MDB) were politicians from São Paulo, although Cardoso was actually born in the state of Rio de Janeiro and Lula in Pernambuco. Cardoso and Lula respectively live in the cities of São Paulo and São Bernardo do Campo. The former president Jair Bolsonaro (PL) was born in small town of Glicério, in the state northwest, but built his political career in the state of Rio de Janeiro.

== Economy ==
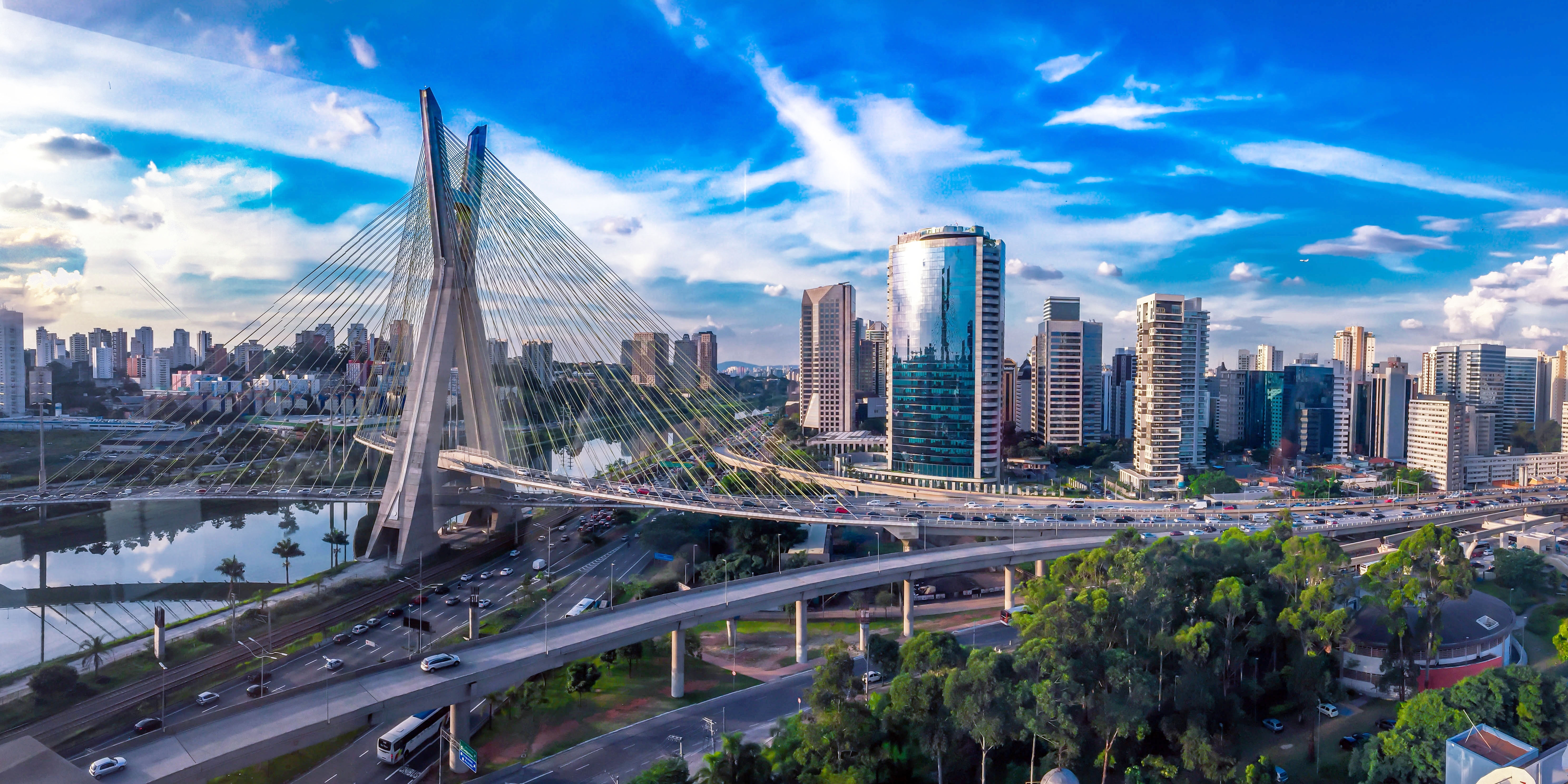
São Paulo City, an alpha global city, is the largest financial center in Latin America and the Southern Hemisphere, and one of the largest in the world

In 2009 the service sector was the largest component of GDP at 69%, followed by the industrial sector at 31%. Agriculture represents 2% of GDP. The state produces 34% of Brazilian goods and services. São Paulo (state) exports: vehicles 17%, airplanes and helicopters 12%, food industry 10%, sugar and alcohol fuel 8%, orange juice 5%, telecommunications 4% (2002).

São Paulo state is responsible for approximately a third of Brazilian GDP. The state's GDP (PPP) amounts US$1.221 trillion, making it the biggest economy in Latin America and in the Southern Hemisphere. Its economy is based on machinery, the automobile and aviation industries, services, financial companies, commerce, textiles, orange growing, sugar cane and coffee bean production.

São Paulo, one of the largest economic poles in both Latin and South America, has a diversified economy. Some of the largest industries are metal-mechanics, sugar cane, textile and car and aviation manufacturing. Service and financial sectors, as well as the cultivation of oranges, cane sugar and coffee form the basis of an economy which accounts for 34% of Brazil's GDP (equivalent to US$727.053 billion).

The towns of Campinas, Ribeirão Preto, Bauru, São José do Rio Preto, Piracicaba, Jaú, Marilia, Botucatu, Assis, and Ourinhos are important university, engineering, agricultural, zoo-technique, technology, or health sciences centers. The Instituto Butantan in São Paulo is a herpetology serpentary science center that collects snakes and other poisonous animals, as it produces venom antidotes. The Instituto Pasteur produces medical vaccines. The state is also at the vanguard of ethanol production, soybeans, aircraft construction in São José dos Campos, and its rivers have been important in generating electricity through its hydroelectric plants.

Moreover, São Paulo is considered one of the world's major producers of beans, rice, coffee, sugar cane, alcohol, flowers and vegetables, maize, cattle, swine, milk, cheese, wine, oil producers, oranges and other fruit. Textile and manufacturing centers such as Rua José Paulino and 25 de Março in the city of São Paulo, attract retail shoppers and wholesale buyers from across Brazil and from countries such as Cape Verde and Angola in Africa.

=== Primary sector ===
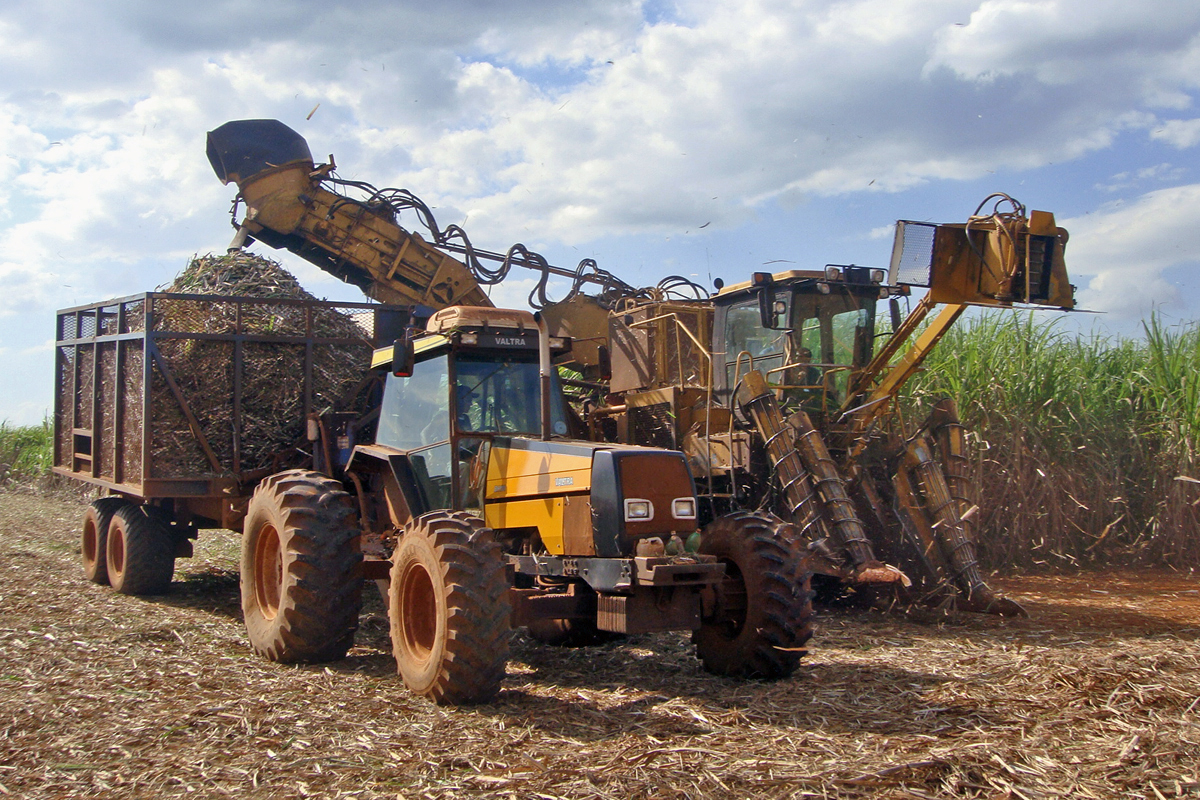
Harvesters in a field of sugar cane in Piracicaba

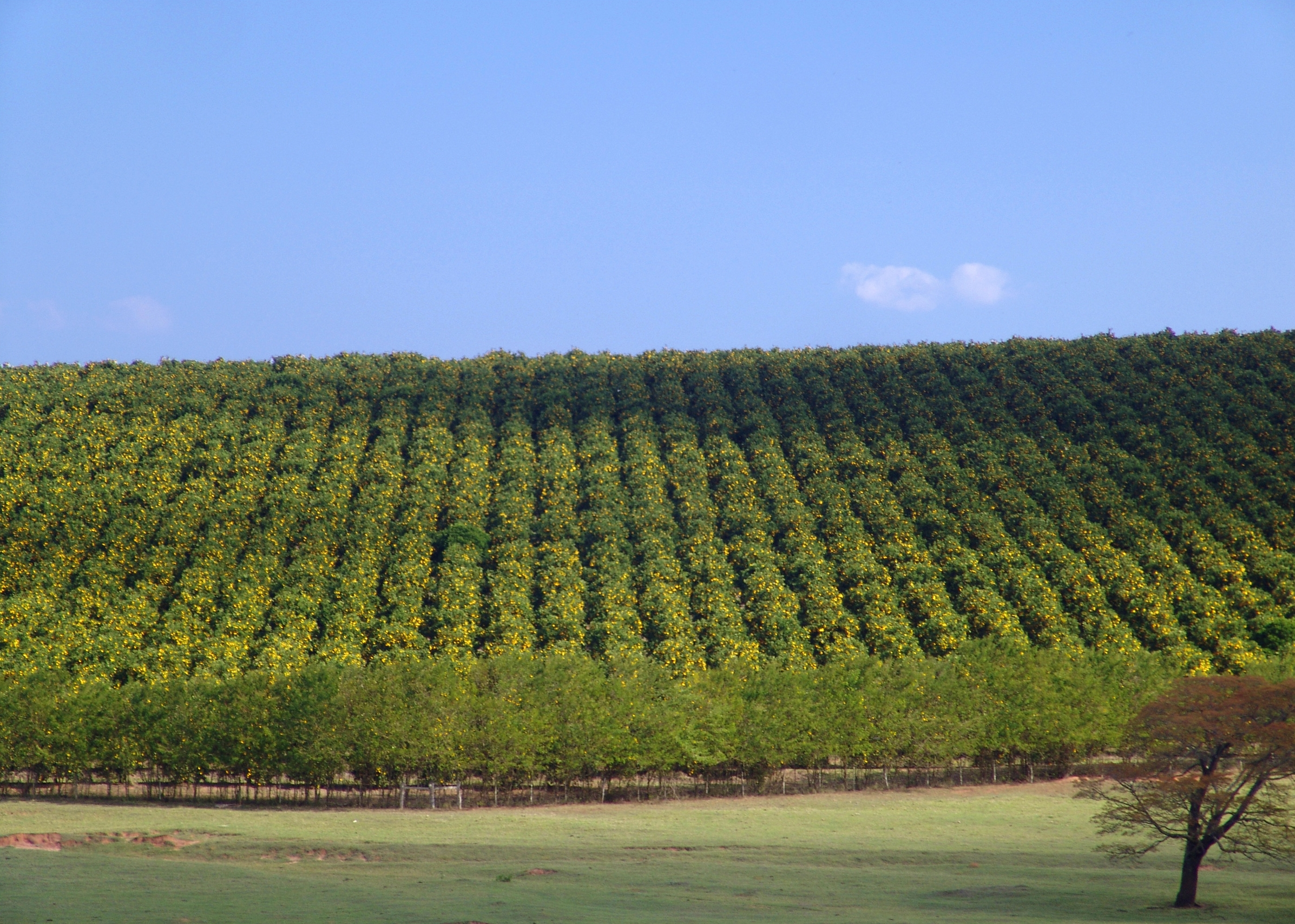
Orange in Avaré. São Paulo is the world's largest orange producer

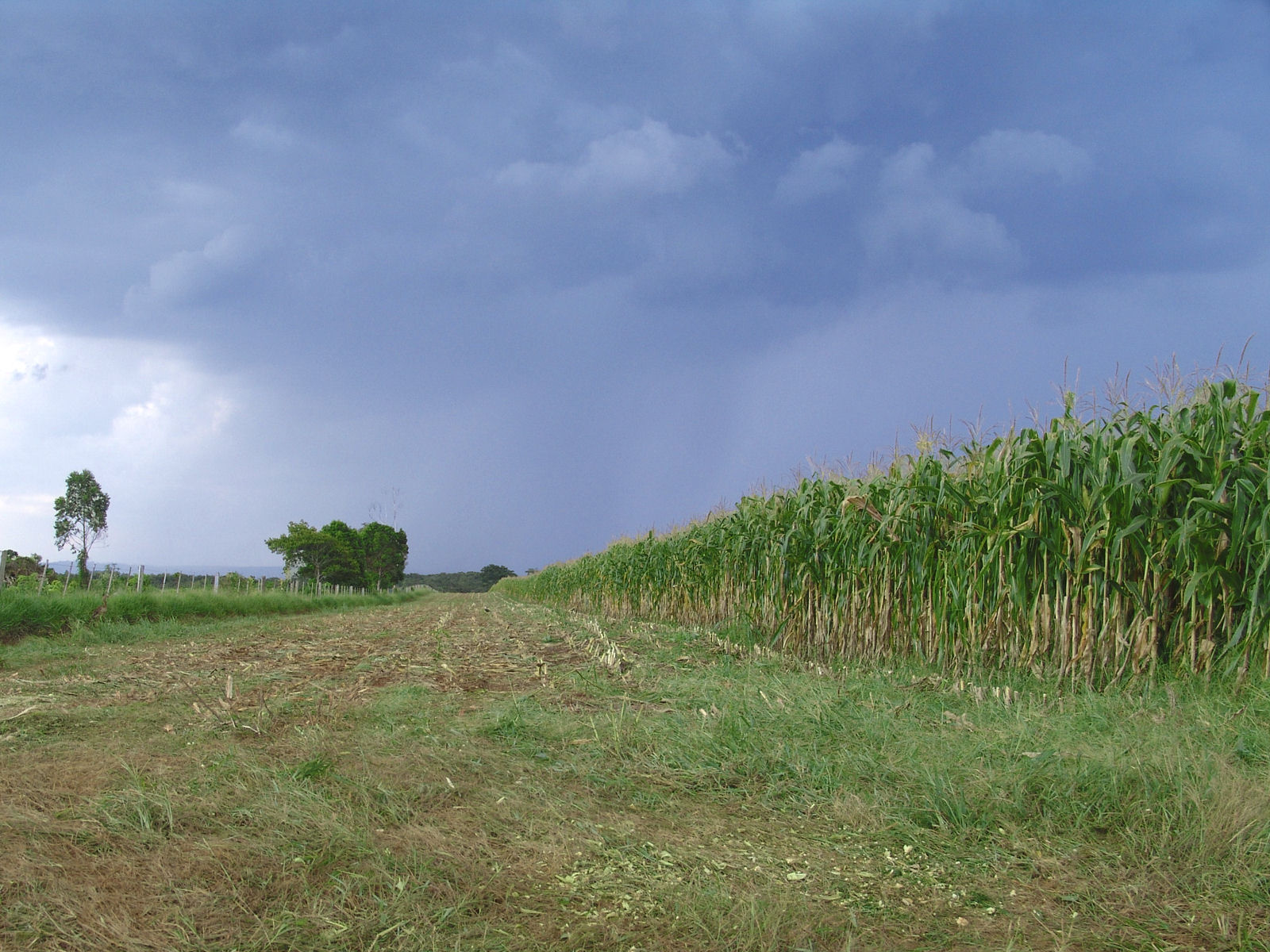
Corn in Avaré

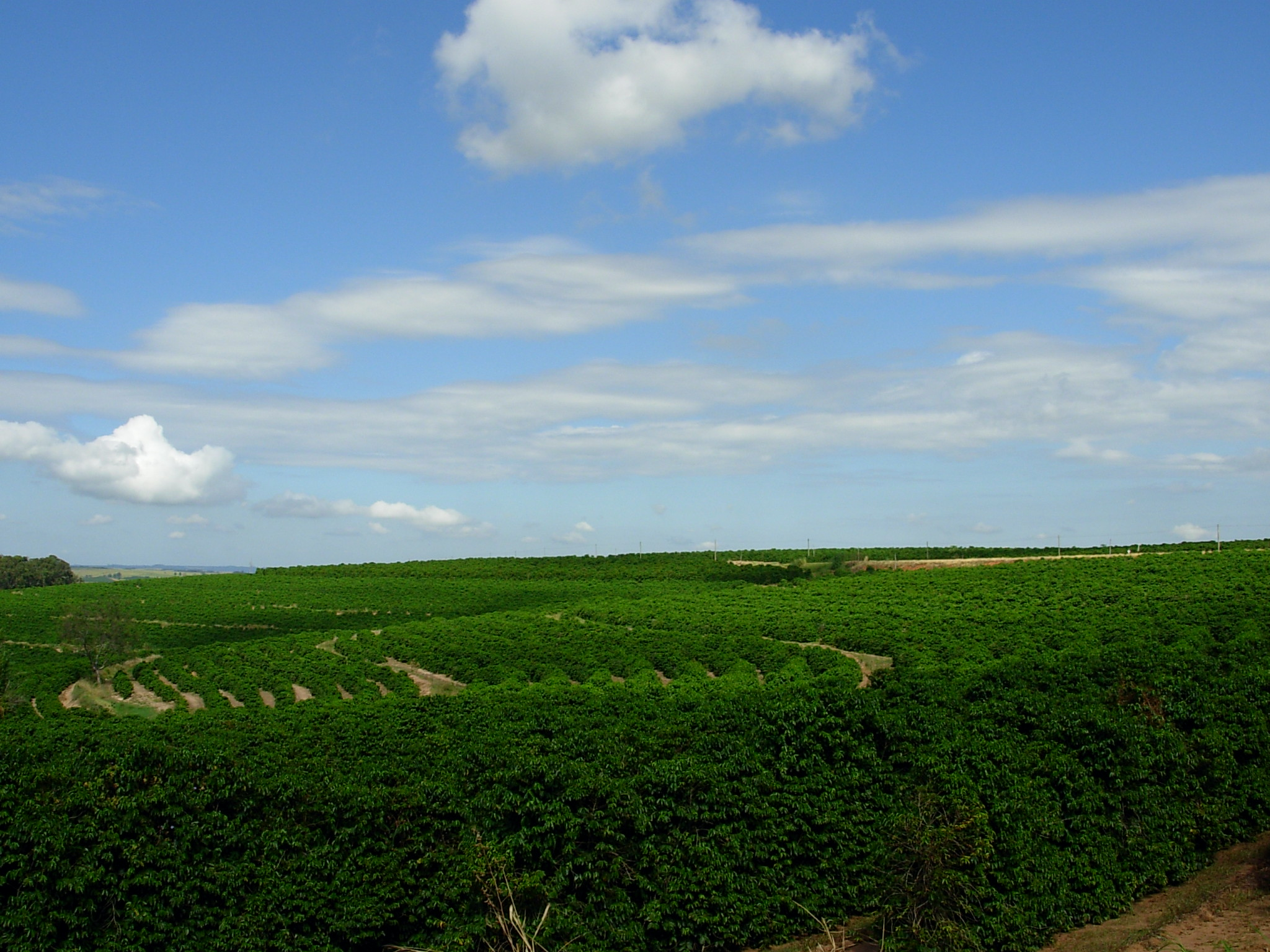
Coffee in Gália

In agriculture, it is a giant producer of sugar cane and oranges, and also has large production of coffee, soy, maize, bananas, peanuts, lemons, persimmons, tangerines, cassavas, carrots, potatoes and strawberries.

In 2019, São Paulo produced 425,617,093 tons of sugar cane. São Paulo production is equivalent to 56.5% of the Brazilian production of 752,895,389 tons, exceeds the production of India (2nd largest world producer of cane) in 2019 (which was 405,416,180 tons) and was equivalent to 21.85% of the world cane production in the same year (1,949,310,108 tons).

In 2019, São Paulo produced 13,256,246 tons of oranges. São Paulo production is equivalent to 78% of Brazilian production of 17,073,593 tons, exceeds the production of China (2nd largest orange producer in the world) of 2019 (which was 10,435,719 tons) and was equivalent to 16.84% of world production of orange in the same year (78,699,604 tons). Most of it is destined for the industrialization and export of juice.

In 2017, São Paulo represented 9.8% of the total national production of coffee (third place).

The state of São Paulo concentrates more than 90% of the national production of peanuts, and Brazil exports around 30% of the peanuts it produces.

São Paulo is also the largest national producer of banana, with 1 million tons in 2018. The country produced 6.7 million tons this year. Brazil was already the 2nd largest producer of the fruit in the world, currently in 3rd place, losing only to India and Ecuador.

The cultivation of soy, on the other hand, is increasing, however, it is not among the largest national producers of this grain. In the 2018–2019 harvest, São Paulo harvested 3 million tons (Brazil produced 120 million).

São Paulo also has a considerable production of maize (corn). In 2019, it produced almost 2 million tons. It is the sixth largest producer of this grain in Brazil. State demand is estimated at 9 million tons, for animal feed, which requires the State of São Paulo to buy corn from other units of the Federation.

In the production of cassava, Brazil produced a total of 17.6 million tons in 2018. São Paulo was the third largest producer in the country, with 1.1 million tons.

In 2018, São Paulo was the largest producer of tangerines in Brazil. About persimmons, São Paulo is the largest producer in the country with 58%. The Southeast is the largest producer of lemons in the country, with 86% of the total obtained in 2018. Only the state of São Paulo produces 79% of the total.

In 2019, in Brazil, there was a total production area of around 4 thousand hectares of strawberries. São Paulo ranked second in Brazil with 800 hectares, with production concentrated in the municipalities of Piedade, Campinas, Jundiaí, Atibaia and nearby municipalities.

With regard to carrots, Brazil ranked fifth in the world ranking in 2016, with an annual production of around 760 thousand tons. In relation to the exports of this product, Brazil occupies the seventh world position. Minas Gerais and São Paulo are the 2 largest producers in Brazil. In São Paulo, the producing municipalities are Piedade, Ibiúna and Mogi das Cruzes. As for potatoes, the main national producer is the state of Minas Gerais, with 32% of the total produced in the country. In 2017, Minas Gerais harvested around 1.3 million tons of the product. São Paulo owns 24% of the production.

Regarding the bovine herd, in 2019 São Paulo had approximately 10.3 million head of cattle (6.1 million for beef, 1 million for milk production, 3 million for both). The production of milk this year was 1.78 billion liters. The number of birds to lay eggs was 56.49 million heads. Production of eggs was 1.34 billion dozen. The State of São Paulo is the largest national producer with 29.4%. In the production of poultry for production in São Paulo, there was a production of 690.96 million heads in 2019, equivalent to an offer of 1.57 million tons of chicken. The number of pigs in the state in 2019 is 929.62 thousand heads. Production was 1.46 million head, or 126 thousand tons of pork.

In 2018, when it comes to chickens, the first ranking region was the Southeast, with 38.9% of the total head of the country. A total of 246.9 million chickens were estimated for 2018. The state of São Paulo was responsible for 21.9%. The national production of chicken eggs was 4.4 billion dozen in 2018. The Southeast region was responsible for 43.8% of the total produced. The state of São Paulo was the largest national producer (25.6%). The number of quail was 16.8 million birds. The Southeast is responsible for 64%, highlighting São Paulo (24.6%).

=== Secondary sector ===
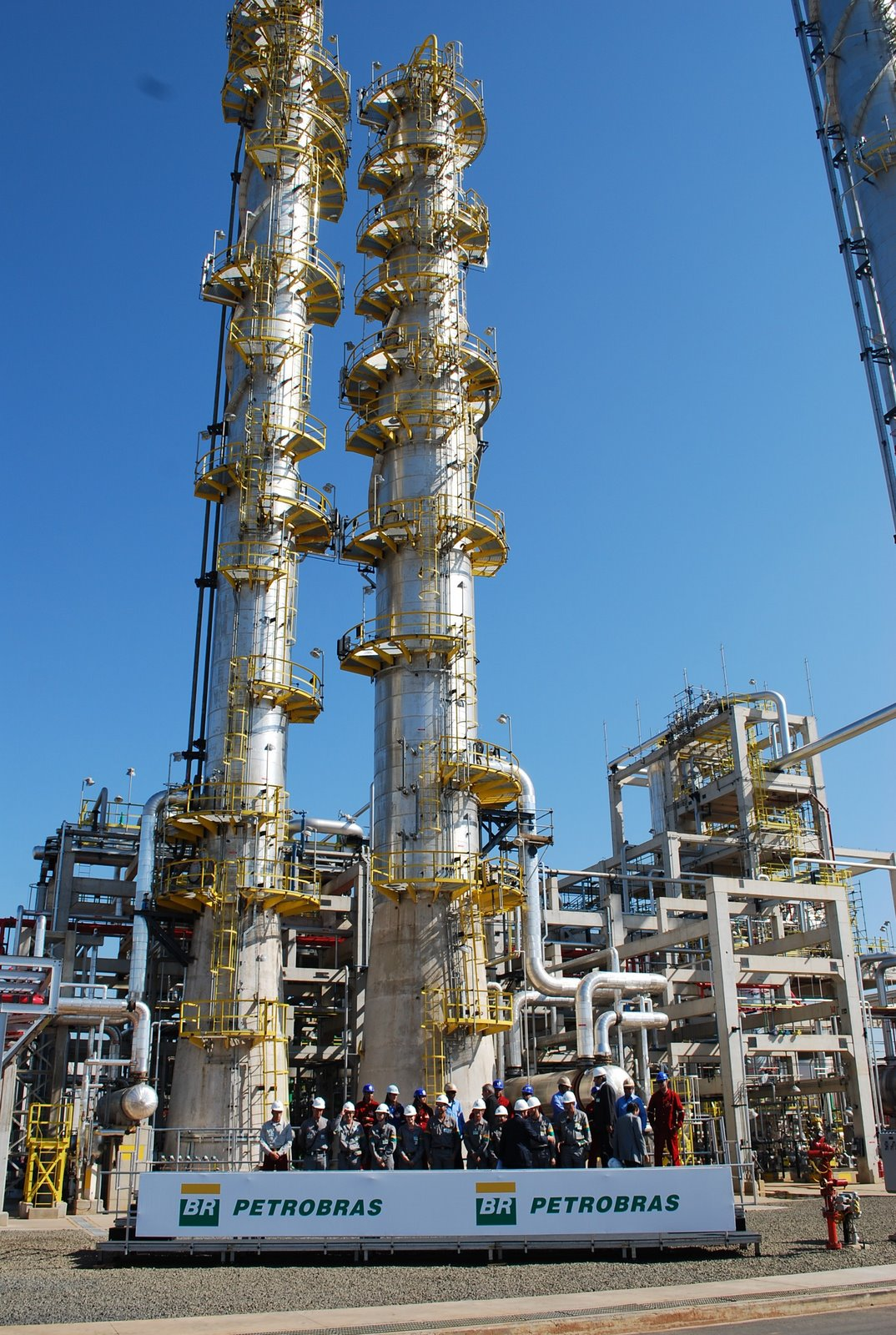
REPLAN, the largest oil refinery in Brazil, in Paulínia

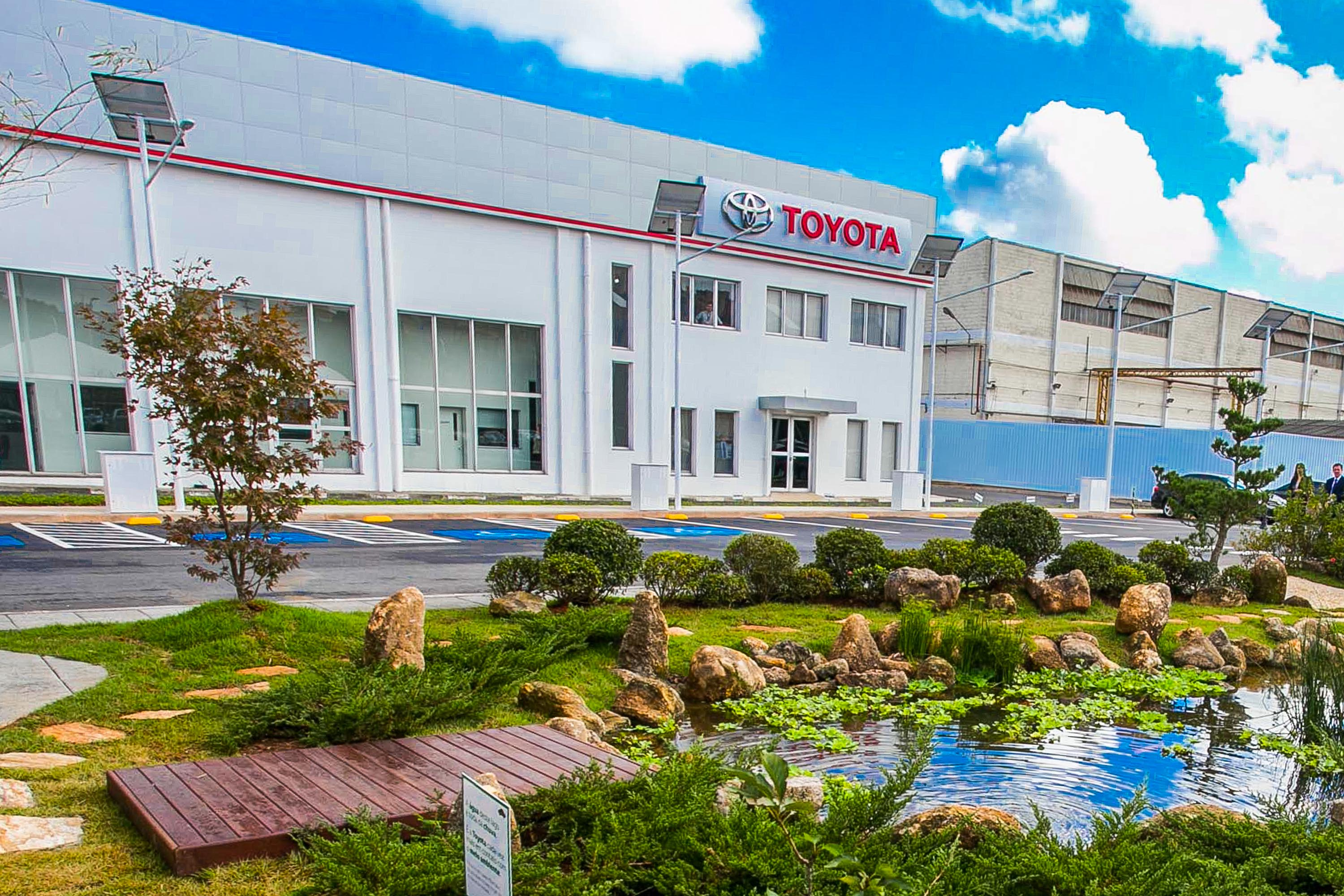
Toyota factory in São Bernardo do Campo

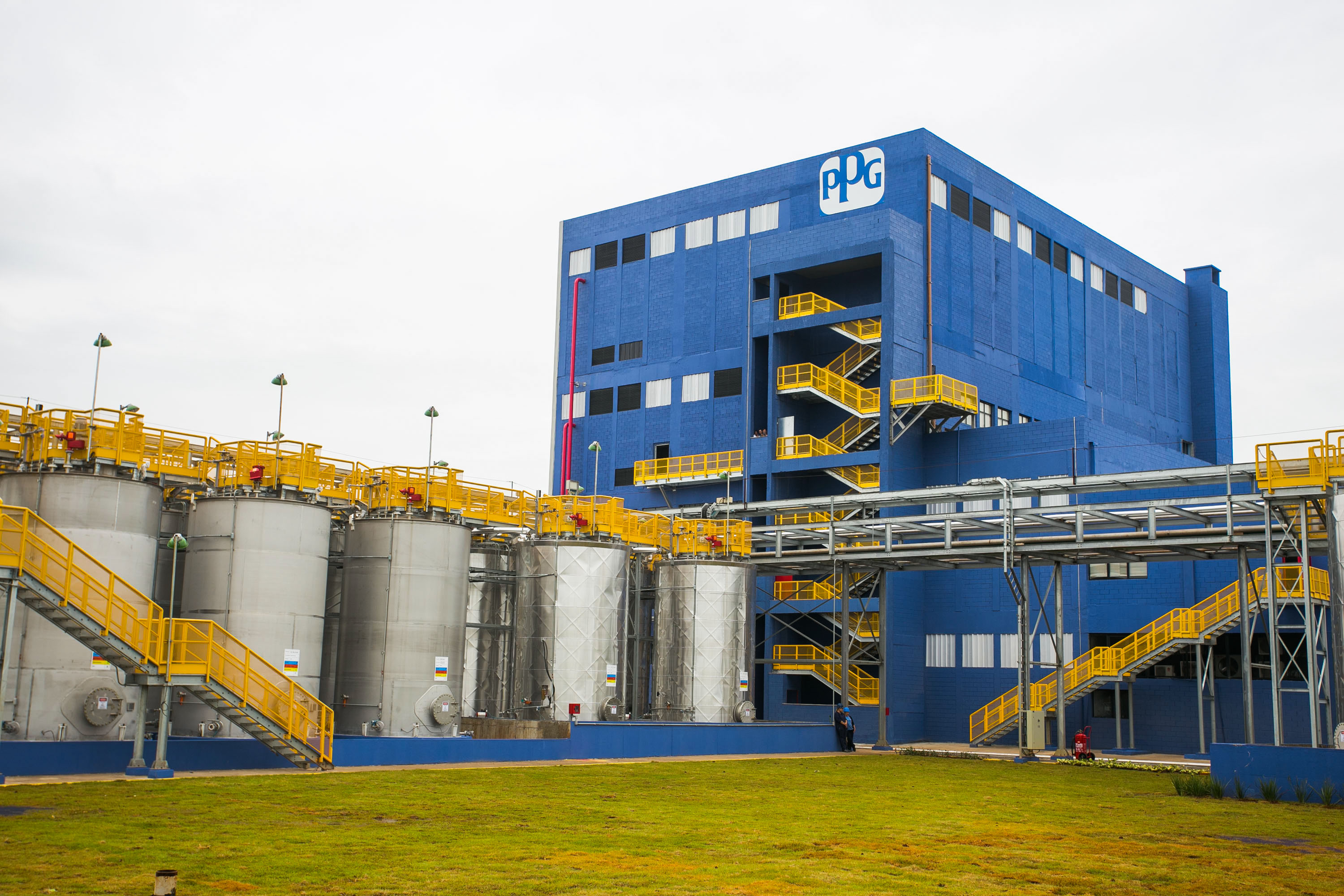
PPG Industries in Sumaré

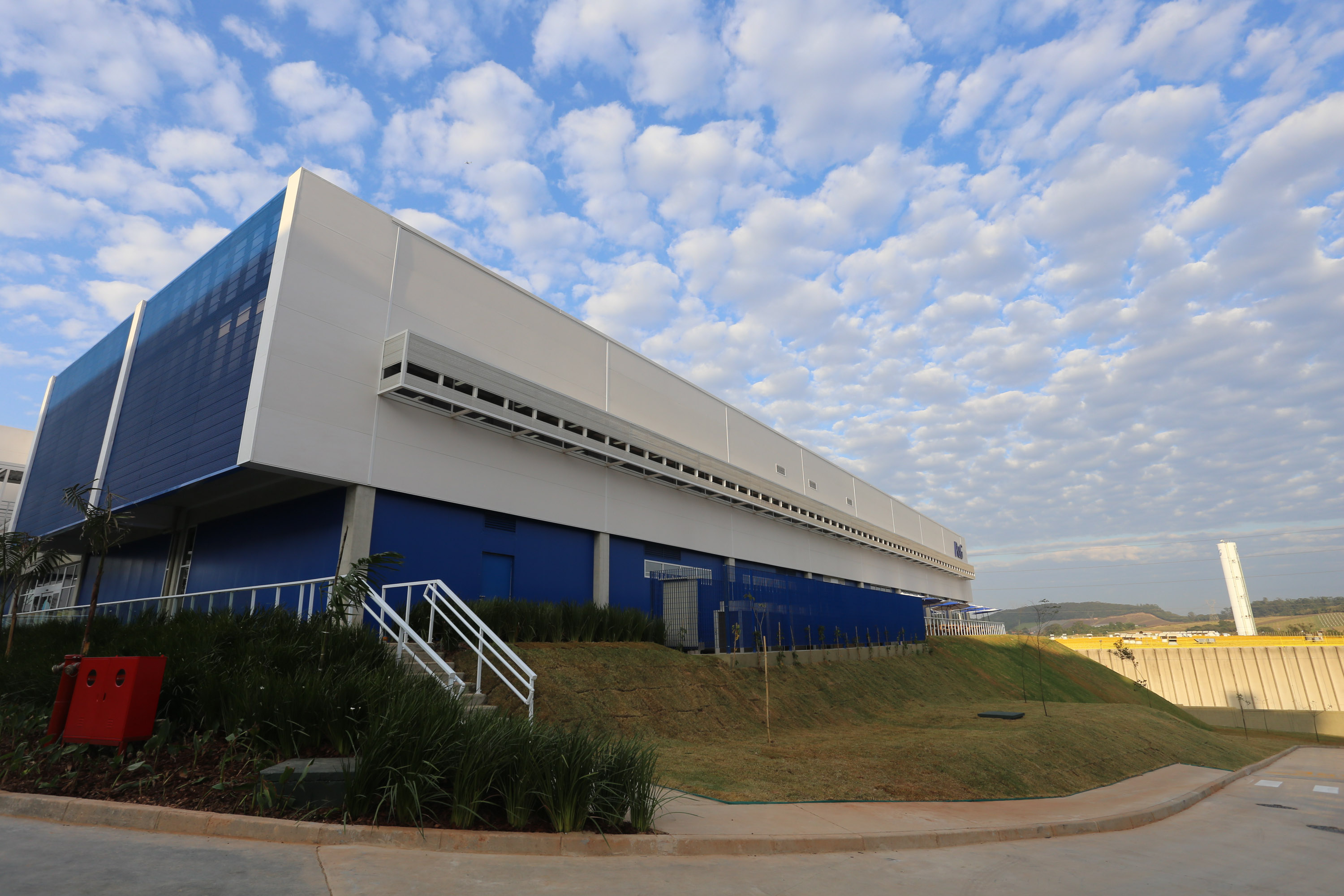
P&G factory in Louveira

Regarding industry, São Paulo had an industrial GDP of R $378.7 billion in 2017, equivalent to 31.6% of the national industry and employed 2,859,258 workers in the industry. The main industrial sectors are: construction (18.7%), food (12.7%), chemical products (8.4%), industrial services for public services, such as electricity and water (7.9%), and motor vehicles (7.0%). These 5 sectors concentrate 54.7% of the state's industry.

In 2019, Rio de Janeiro was the largest producer of oil and natural gas in Brazil, with 71% of the total volume produced. São Paulo is in second place, with an 11.5% share in total production.

In Brazil, the automotive sector represents about 22% of industrial GDP. ABC Paulista is the first center and largest automobile center in Brazil. When the country's manufacturing was practically restricted to ABC, the State represented 74.8% of Brazilian production in 1990. In 2017, this index decreased to 46.6%, and in 2019, to 40.1%, due to a phenomenon of internalization of vehicle production in Brazil, driven by factors such as unions, which made payroll and labor burdens excessively burdensome, discouraged investment, and favored the search for new cities. The development of ABC cities has also helped curb the appeal, due to rising real estate costs and a higher density of residential areas. São Paulo has factories of GM, Volkswagen, Ford, Honda, Toyota, Hyundai, Mercedes-Benz, Scania and Caoa.

In the production of tractors, in 2017, the main manufacturers in Brazil were John Deere, New Holland, Massey Ferguson, Valtra, Case IH and the Brazilian Agrale. They all have factories in the southeast, basically in São Paulo.

In the steel industry, Brazilian crude steel production was 32.2 million tons in 2019. Minas Gerais represented 32.3% of the volume produced in the period, with 10,408 million tons. The other largest steel centers in Brazil in 2019 were: Rio de Janeiro (8,531 million tons), Espírito Santo (6,478 million tons) and São Paulo (2,272 million tons). Some steel manufacturers in São Paulo are COSIPA (owned by Usiminas), Aços Villares and Gerdau, which has factories in Mogi das Cruzes and Pindamonhangaba, which produce special steel, and Araçariguama, which produces long steel for civil construction.

In 2011, Brazil had the sixth largest chemical industry in the world, with net sales of US$157 billion, or 3.1% of world sales. At that time, there were 973 chemical factories for industrial use. They are concentrated in the Southeast Region, mainly in São Paulo. The chemical industry contributed 2.7% to the Brazilian GDP in 2012 and was established as the fourth largest sector in the manufacturing industry. Despite registering one of the largest sales in the sector in the world, the Brazilian chemical industry, in 2012 and 2013, experienced a strong transfer of production abroad, with a drop in national industrial production and an increase in imports. A third of consumption in the country was supplied by imports. 448 products stopped being manufactured in Brazil between 1990 and 2012. This led to the interruption of 1,710 production lines. In 1990, the share of imported products in Brazilian consumption was only 7%, in 2012 it was 30%. The main companies in the sector in Brazil are: Braskem, BASF, Bayer, among others. In 2018, the Brazilian chemical sector was the eighth largest in the world, representing 10% of national industrial GDP and 2.5% of total GDP. In 2020, imports will occupy 43% of the internal demand for chemical products. Since 2008, the average use of capacity in the Brazilian chemical industry has been at a level considered low, ranging from 70 to 83%.

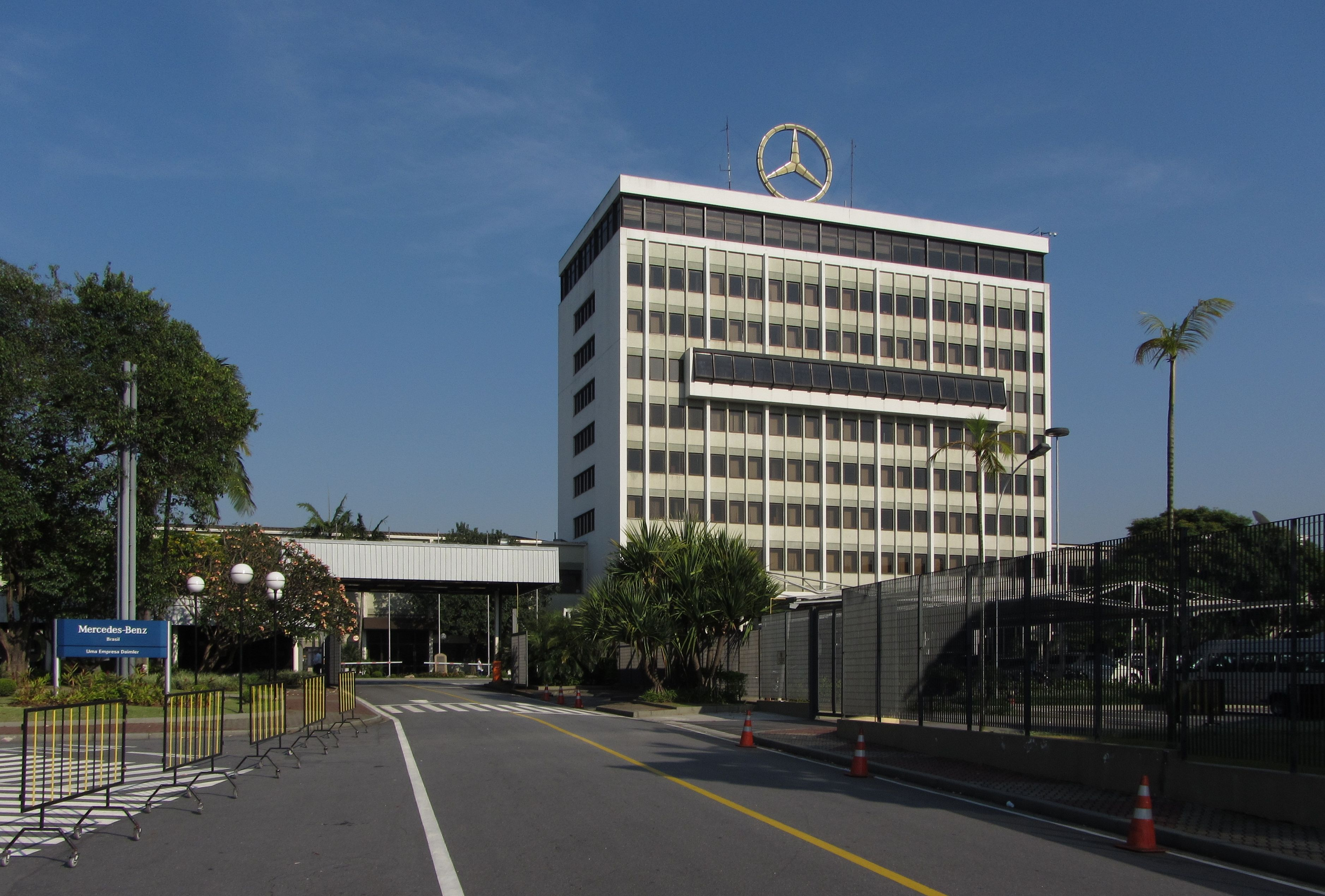
Headquarters of Mercedes-Benz Brazil in São Bernardo do Campo

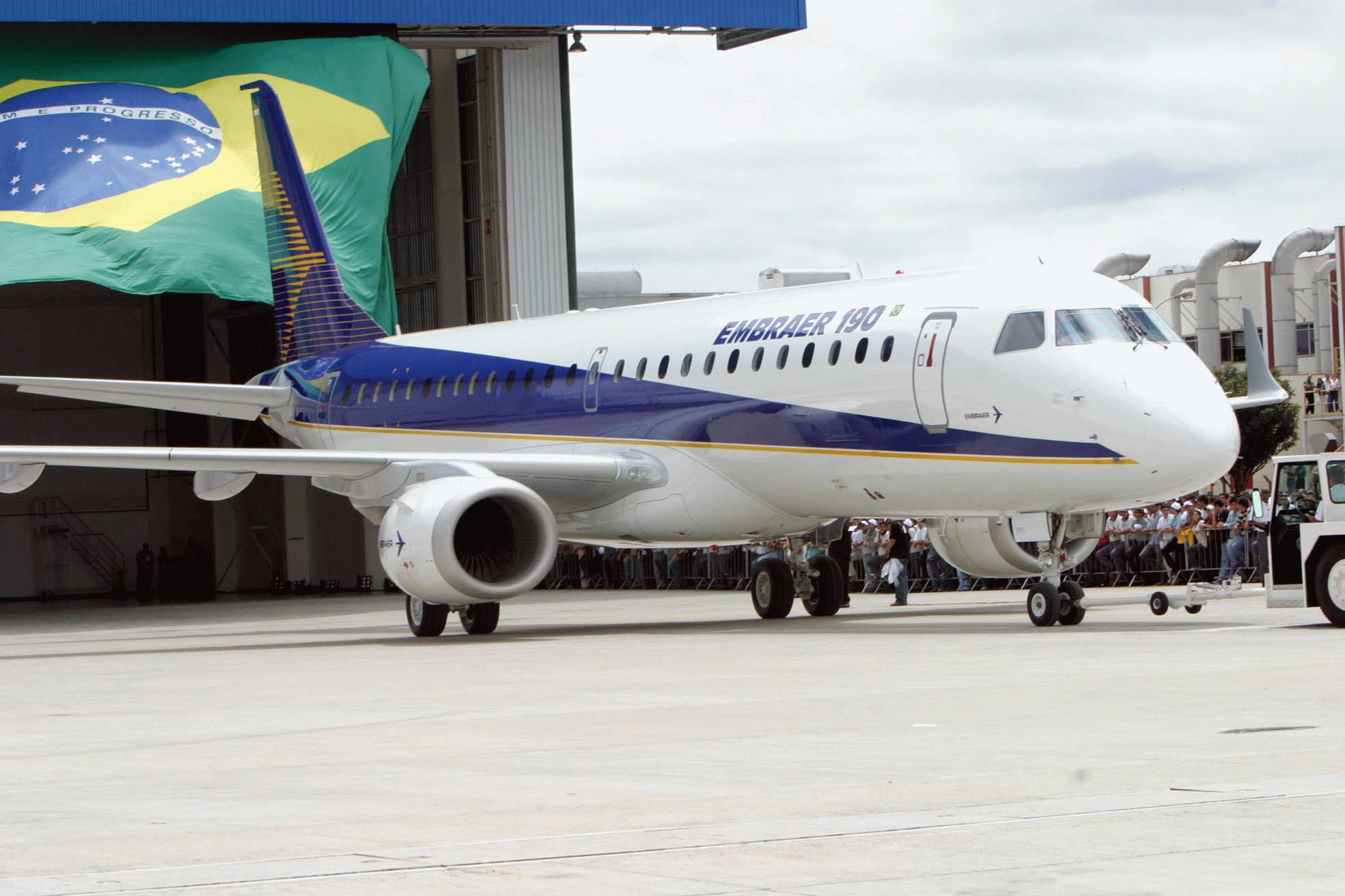
Embraer E-190, jet developed by company Embraer, in São José dos Campos

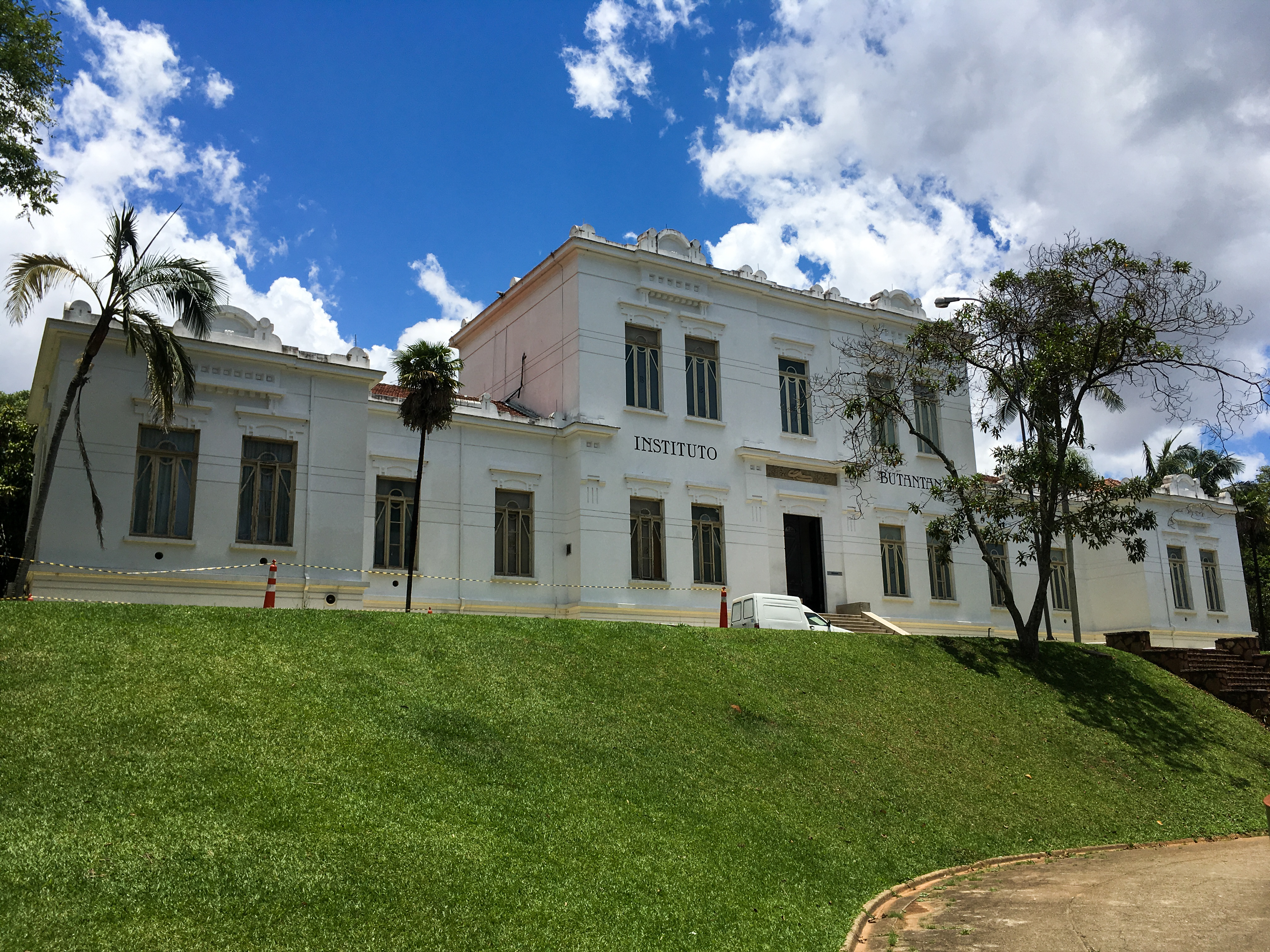
Instituto Butantan in São Paulo City

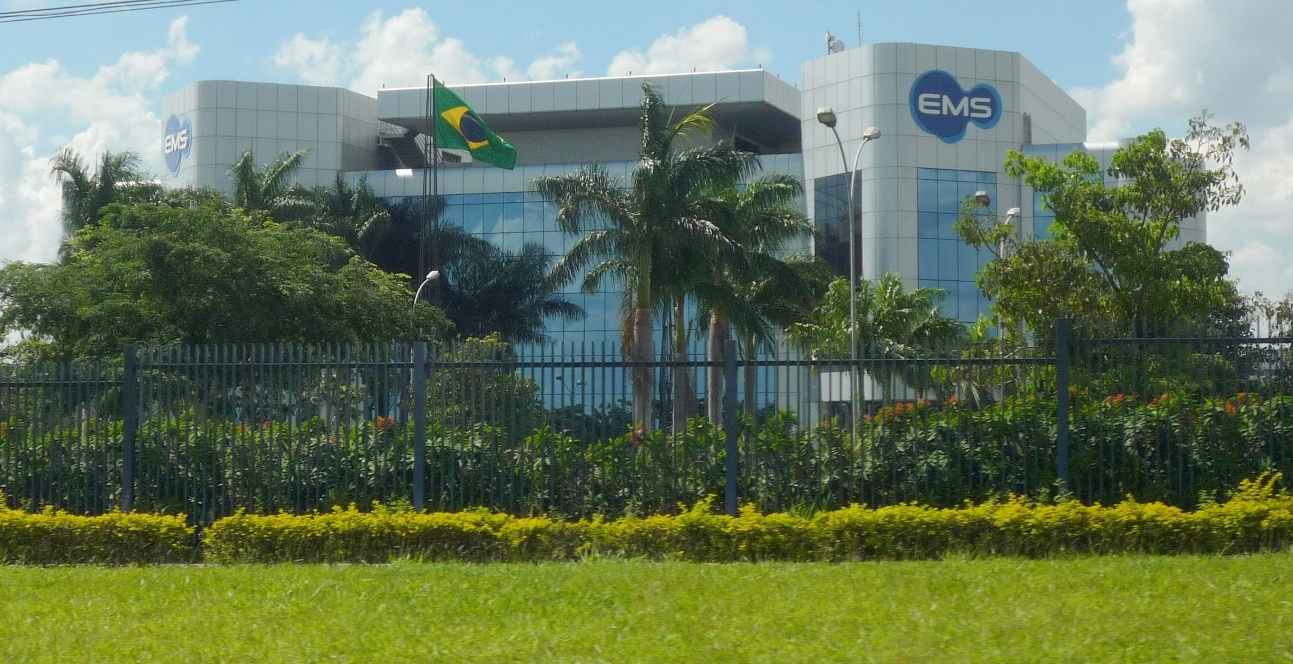
EMS headquarters in Hortolândia

In Food Industry, in 2019, Brazil was the second largest exporter of processed foods in the world, with a value of U $34.1 billion in exports. The income of the Brazilian food and beverage industry in 2019 was R $699.9 billion, 9.7% of the country's Gross Domestic Product. In 2015, the food and beverage industry in Brazil comprised 34,800 companies (not including bakeries), the vast majority of which were small. These companies employed more than 1,600,000 workers, making the food and beverage industry the largest employer in the manufacturing industry. There are around 570 large companies in Brazil, which concentrate a good part of the total industry income. São Paulo created companies such as: Yoki, Vigor, Minerva Foods, Bauducco, Santa Helena, Marilan, Ceratti, Fugini, Chocolates Pan, Embaré, among others.

In the Pharmaceutical Industry, most companies in Brazil have been established in São Paulo and Rio de Janeiro for a long time. In 2019, the situation was that, due to the tax advantages offered in states like Pernambuco, Goiás and Minas Gerais, companies left RJ and SP and went to these states. In 2017, Brazil was considered the sixth largest pharmaceutical market in the world. Drug sales in pharmacies reached around R $57 billion (US$17.79 billion) in the country. The pharmaceutical market in Brazil had 241 regularized and authorized laboratories for the sale of medicines. Of these, the majority (60%) have national capital. Multinational companies had approximately 52.44% of the market, with 34.75% in commercialized packaging. Brazilian laboratories represent 47.56% of the market in sales and 65.25% in boxes sold. In the distribution of medicine sales by state, São Paulo ranked first: São Paulo's pharmaceutical industry had a turnover of R $53.3 billion, 76.8% of total sales across the country. The companies that benefited the most from the sale of medicines in the country in 2015 were EMS, Hypermarcas (NeoQuímica), Sanofi (Medley), Novartis, Aché, Eurofarma, Takeda, Bayer, Pfizer and GSK.

In the footwear industry, in 2019 Brazil produced 972 million pairs. Exports were around 10%, reaching almost 125 million pairs. Brazil ranks fourth among world producers, behind China, India and Vietnam, and 11th among the largest exporters. Of the pairs produced, 49% were made of plastic or rubber, 28.8% were made of synthetic laminate, and only 17.7% were made of leather. The largest polo in Brazil is located in Rio Grande do Sul, but São Paulo has important shoe centers, such as the one in the city of Franca, specialized in men's footwear, in the city of Jaú, specialized in women's footwear and in the city of Birigui, specialized in children's footwear. Jaú, Franca and Birigui represent 92% of footwear production in the state of São Paulo. Birigui has 350 companies, which generate around 13 thousand jobs, producing 45.9 million pairs per year. 52% of children's shoes in the country are produced in this city. From Birigui came the majority of the most famous children's shoe factories in the country. Jaú has 150 factories that produce around 130 thousand pairs of cheap women's shoes per day. The footwear sector in Franca has around 550 companies and employs around 20,000 employees. Most of the country's most famous men's shoe factories come from São Paulo. Overall, however, the Brazilian industry has been struggling to compete with Chinese footwear, which has an unbeatable price due to the difference in tax collection from one country to another, in addition to the absence of strong Brazilian labor taxes in China. Brazilian businessmen have had to invest in value-added products, combining quality and design, in order to survive.

In the textile industry, Brazil, despite being among the 5 largest producers in the world in 2013, and being representative in the consumption of textiles and clothing, has very little insertion in world trade. In 2015, Brazilian imports ranked 25th (US$5.5 billion). And in exports, it was only 40th in the world ranking. Brazil's share of world textile and clothing trade is only 0.3%, due to the difficulty of competing in price with producers from India and mainly from China. The gross value of production, which includes the consumption of intermediate goods and services, of the Brazilian textile industry corresponded to almost R $40 billion in 2015, 1.6% of the gross value of industrial production in Brazil. São Paulo (37.4%) is the largest producer. The main productive areas of São Paulo are the Metropolitan Region of São Paulo and Campinas.

In Electronics industry, the billing of industries in Brazil reached R $153.0 billion in 2019, about 3% of national GDP. The number of employees in the sector was 234.5 thousand people. Exports were $5.6 billion, and the country's imports were $32.0 billion. Brazil, despite decades-long efforts to rid itself of dependence on technology imports, has yet to reach this level. Imports are concentrated on expensive components such as processors, microcontrollers, memories, magnetic disks, lasers, LEDs and LCDs mounted below. The cables for telecommunications and electricity distribution, cables, optical fibers and connectors are manufactured in the country. Brazil has two large centers for the production of electronic products, located in the Metropolitan Region of Campinas, in the State of São Paulo, and in the Free Trade Zone of Manaus, in the State of Amazonas. There are large, internationally renowned technology companies as well as part of the industries that participate in its supply chain. The country also has other smaller centers, such as the municipalities of São José dos Campos and São Carlos, in the state of São Paulo. In Campinas there are industrial units of groups such as General Electric, Samsung, HP and Foxconn, a manufacturer of Apple and Dell products. São José dos Campos, focuses on the aviation industry. This is where the headquarters of Embraer is located, a Brazilian company that is the third largest aircraft manufacturer in the world, after Boeing and Airbus. In the production of cell phones and other electronic products, Samsung produces in Campinas; LG produces in Taubaté; Flextronics, which produces Motorola cell phones, produces in Jaguariúna; and Semp-TCL produces in Cajamar. In the household appliances industry, sales were 12.9 million units in 2017. The sector had its peak in sales in 2012, with 18.9 million units. The brands that sold the most were Brastemp, Electrolux, Consul and Philips. Brastemp is originally from São Bernardo do Campo. São Paulo was also the place where Metalfrio was founded.

Several famous multinationals have factories in São Paulo, such as Coca-Cola, Nestlé, PepsiCo, Ambev, Procter & Gamble and Unilever.

=== Tertiary sector ===
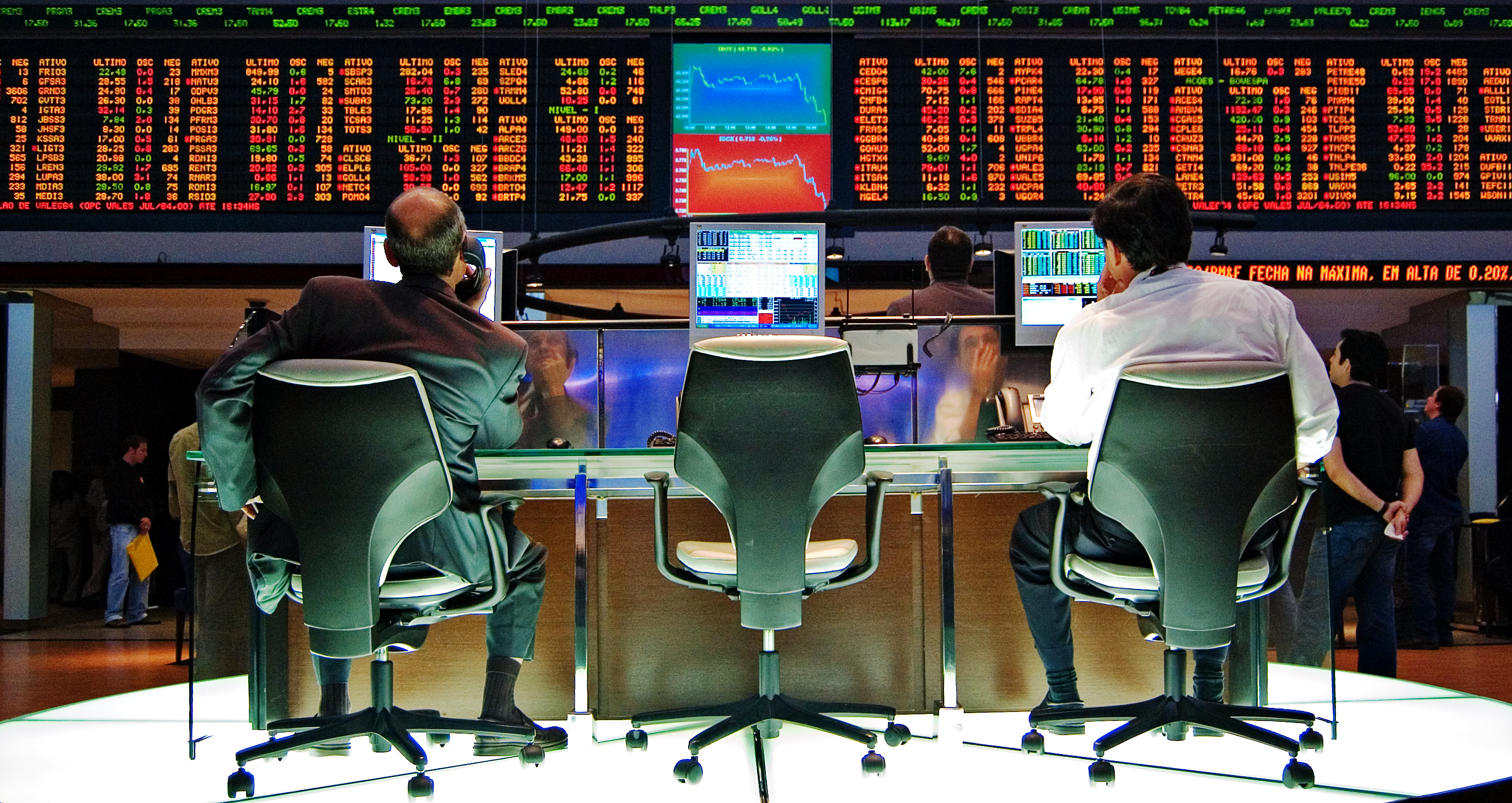
The São Paulo Stock Exchange (Bovespa)

The tertiary sector is the largest and most relevant sector of São Paulo's economy: in 2011, the share of services represented 70.46% of the total value added to the economy of the entire state.

According to the Map of Companies, from the Ministry of Development, Industry, Trade and Services (MDIC), there were 5,994,192 companies in the state (2023), and 17,047,181 workers worked for all these companies, with a general average salary of more than 3 minimum wages.

In São Paulo, in 2023, there were 5,193 agencies (financial institutions), which yielded 2,464,955,652,102 thousand reais in credit operations, 130,091,336,437 thousand reais in government demand deposits, 325,739,438,658 thousand reais in savings, 1,029,348,681,505 thousand reais in time deposits and 1,472,186,852 thousand reais in obligations to receive.

== Tourism ==
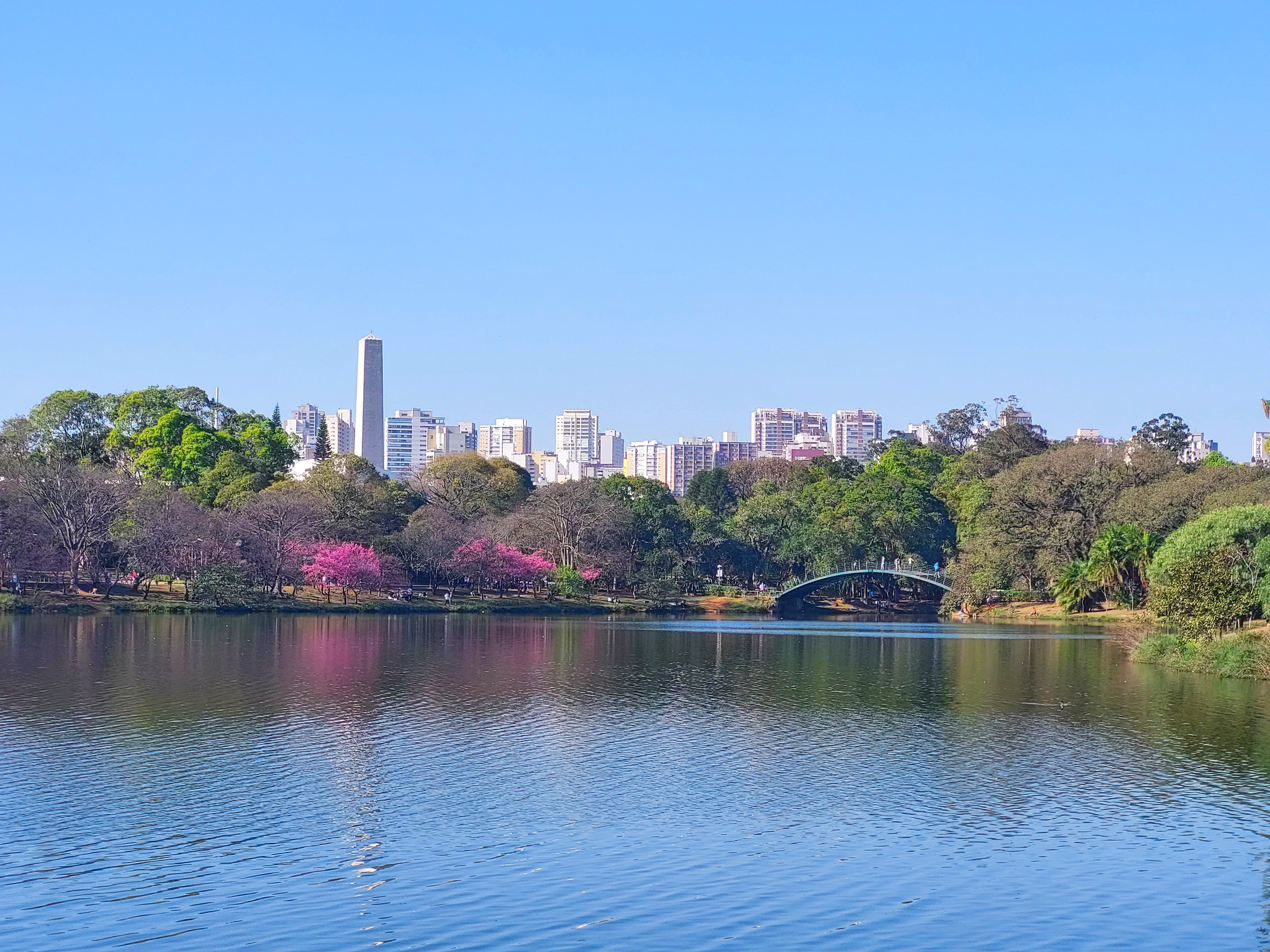
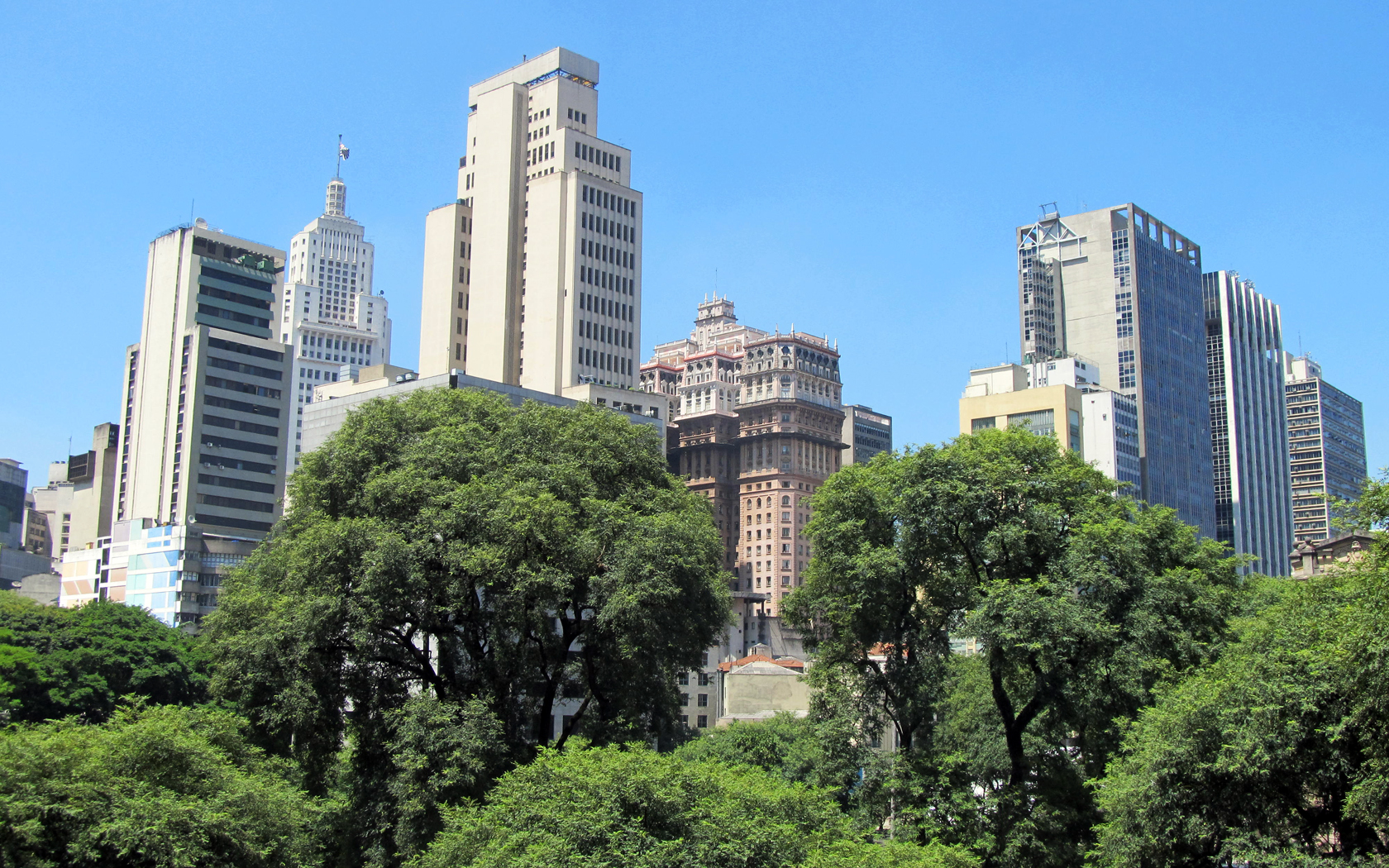
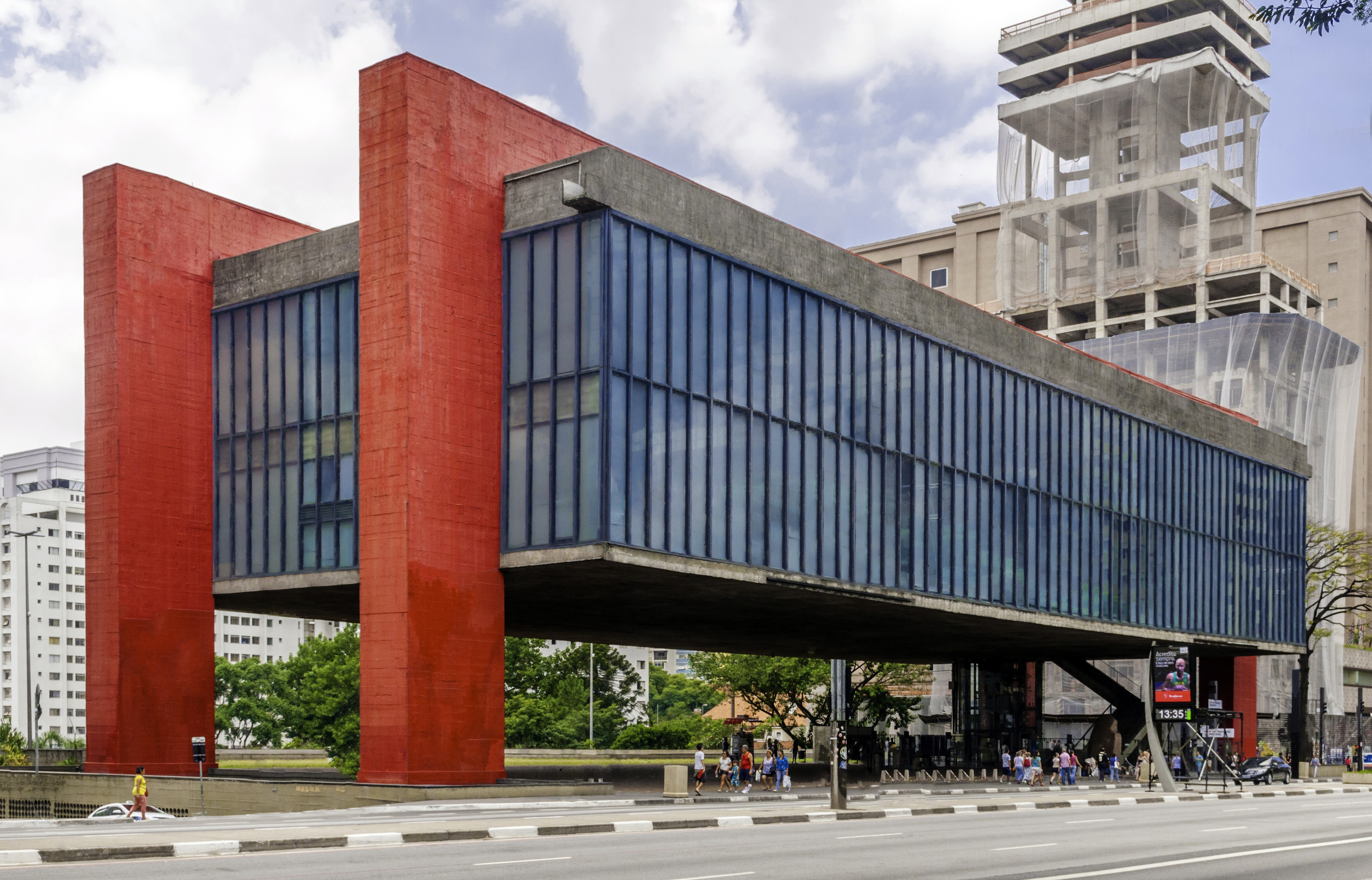
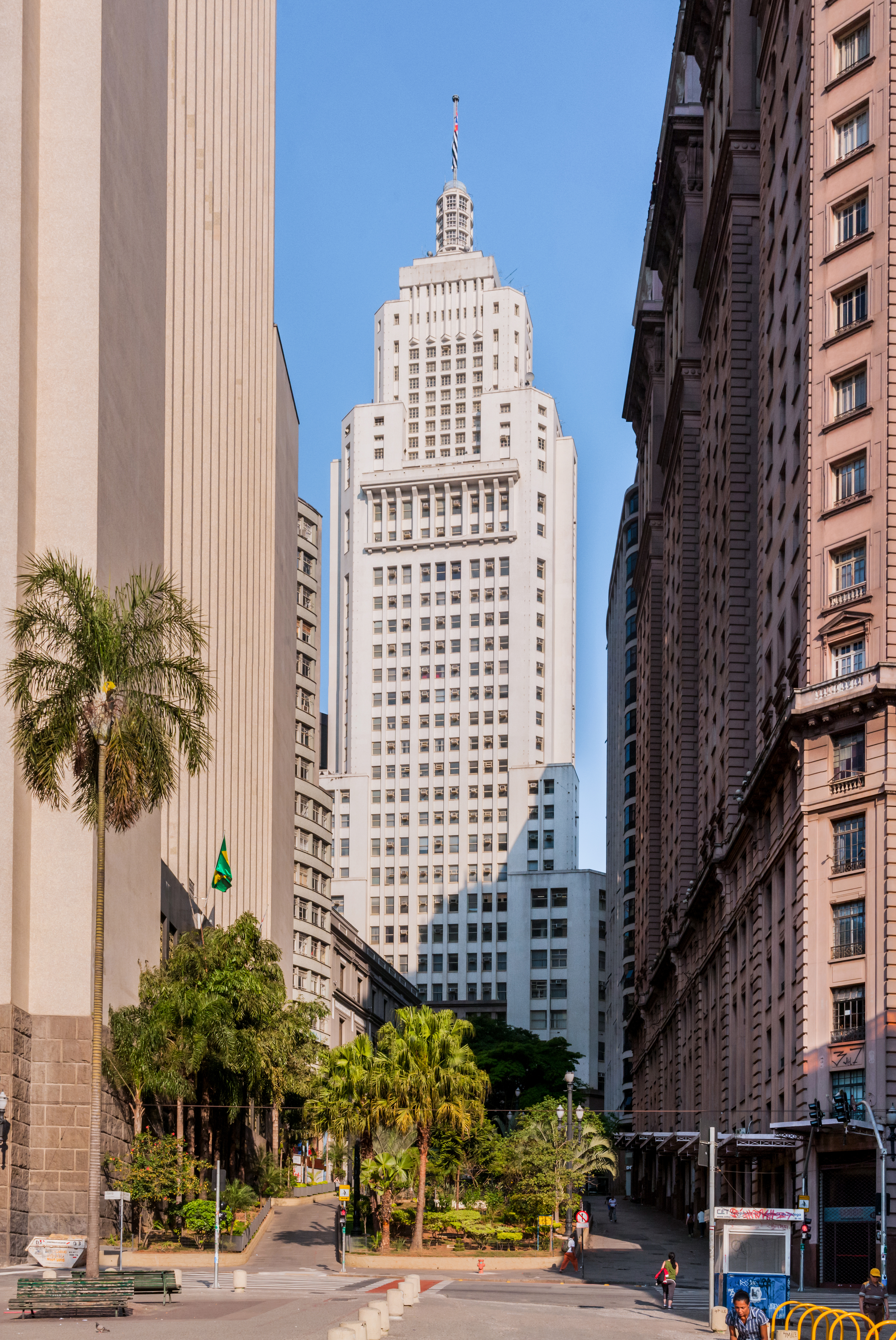
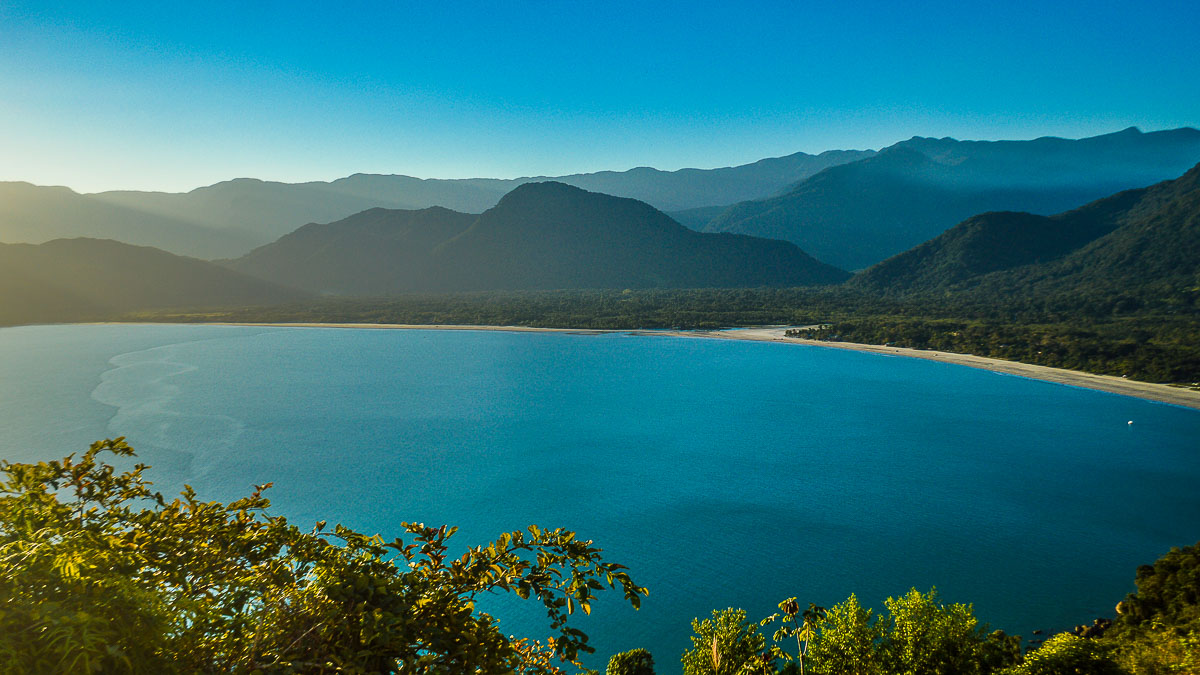
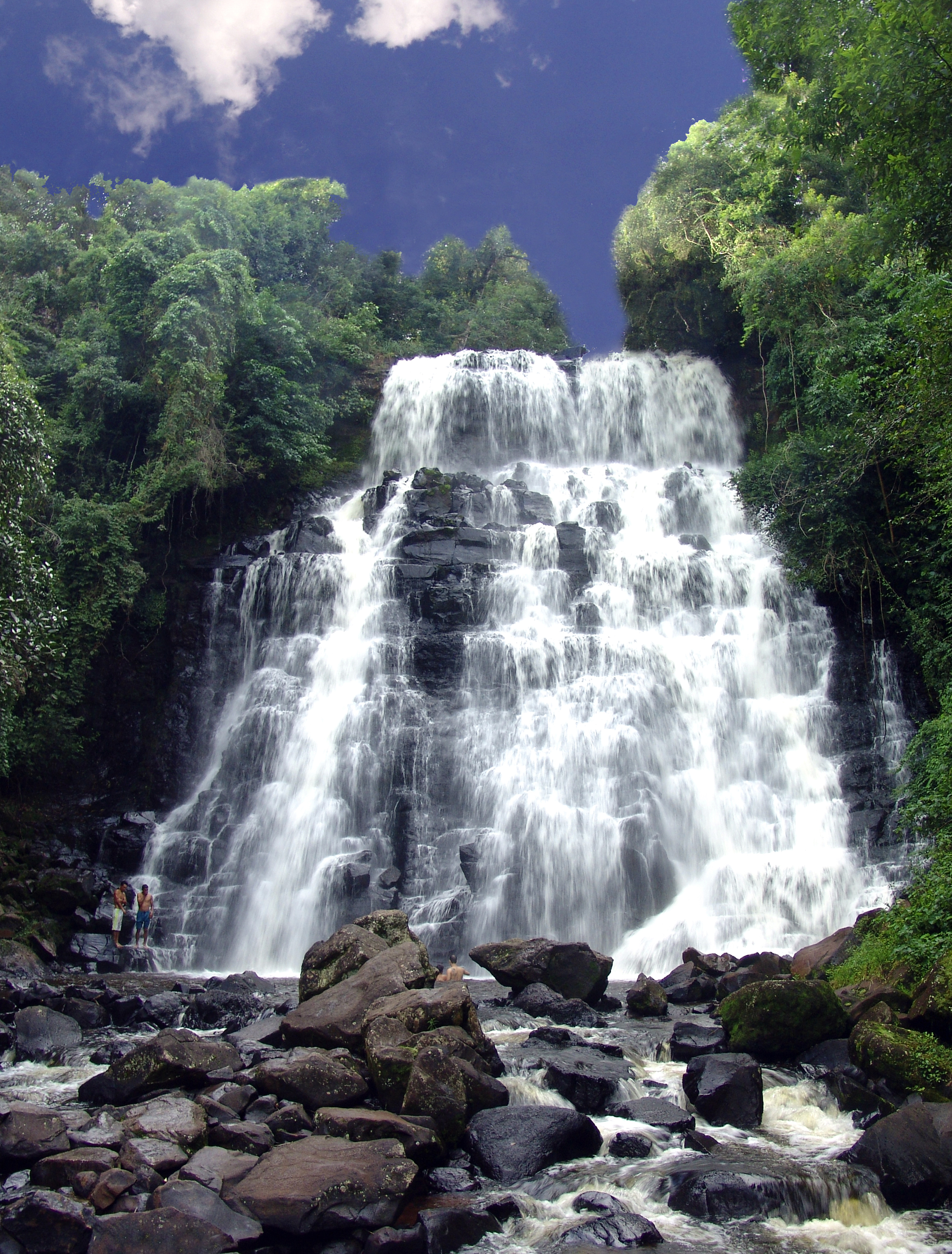
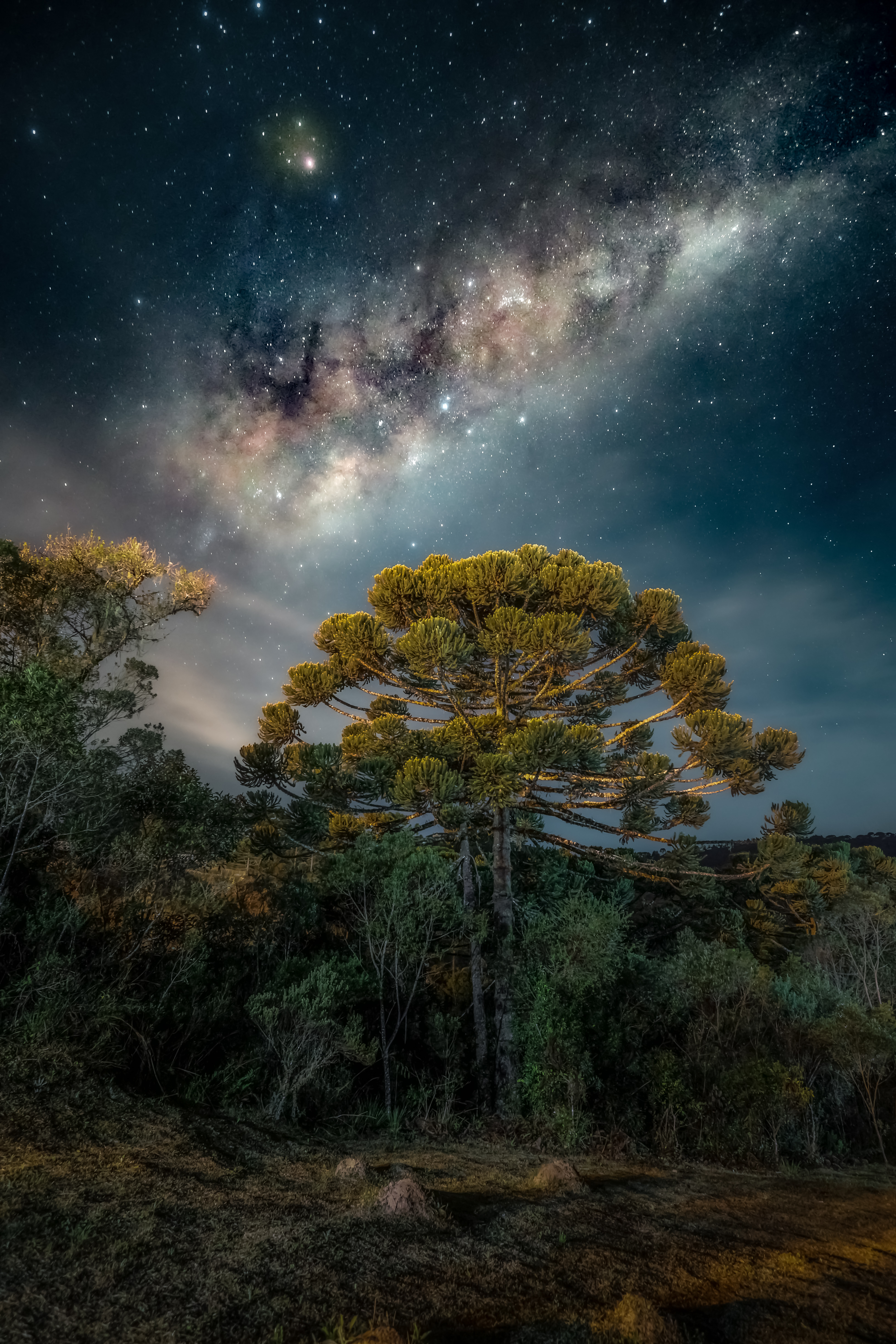
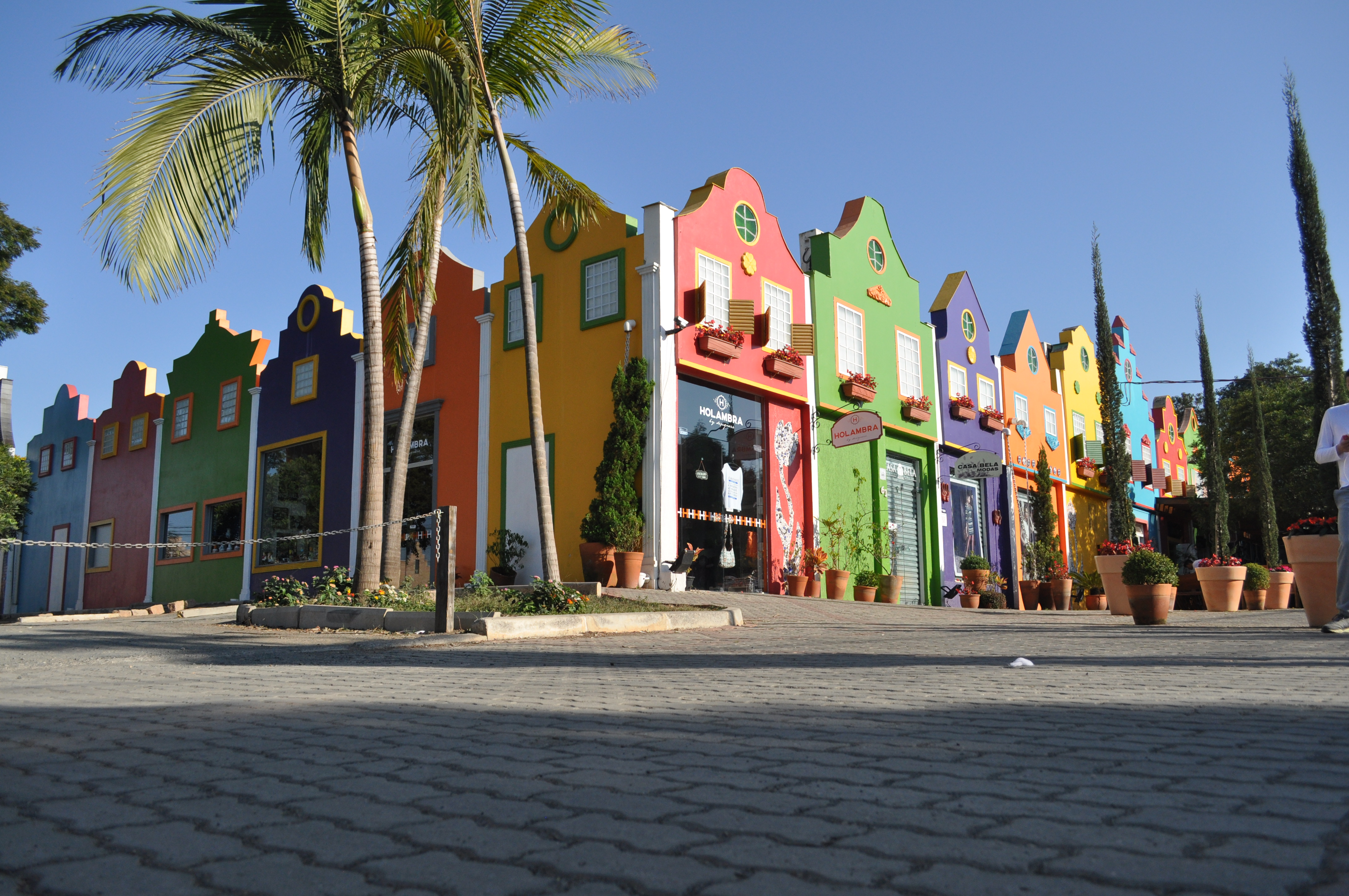
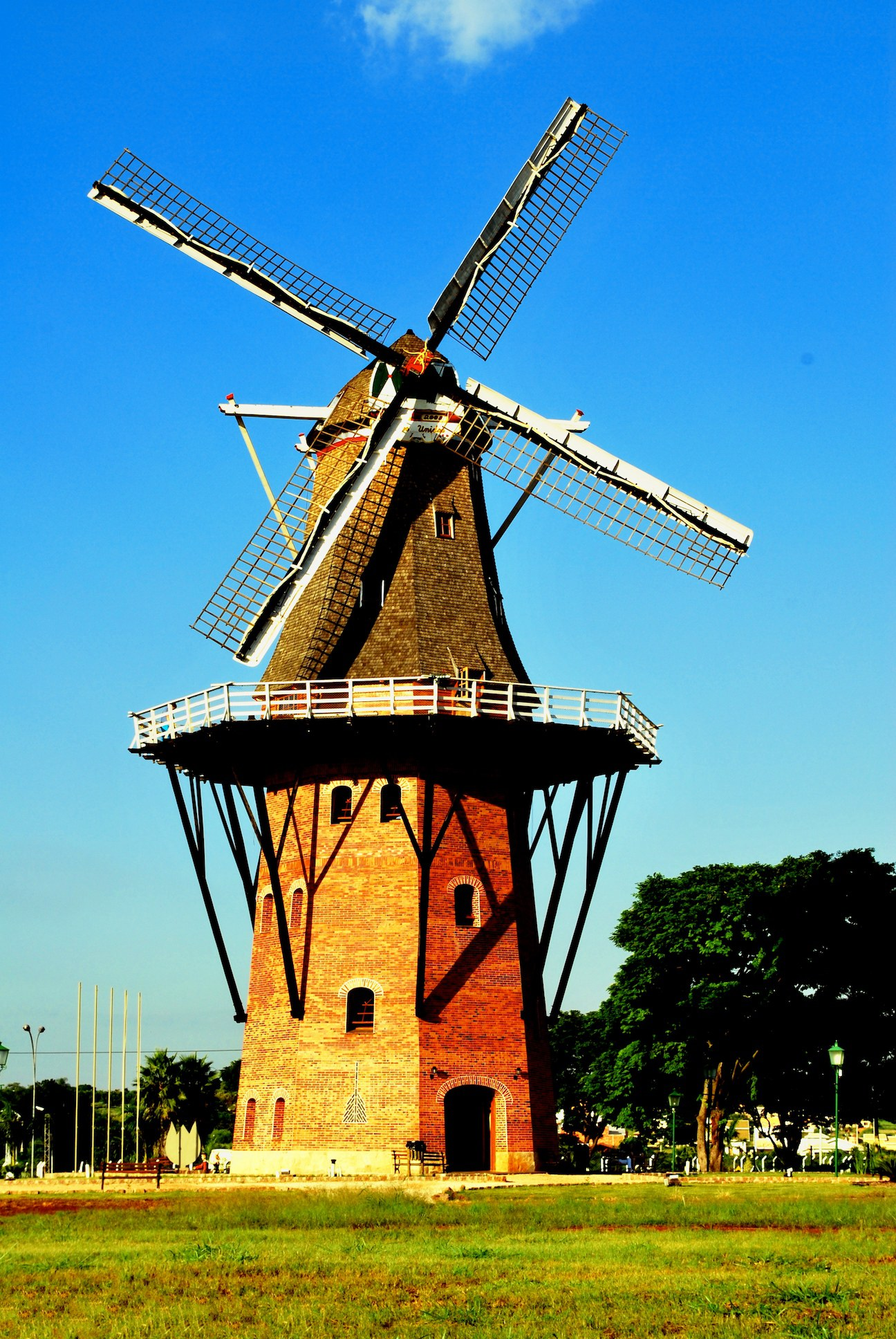
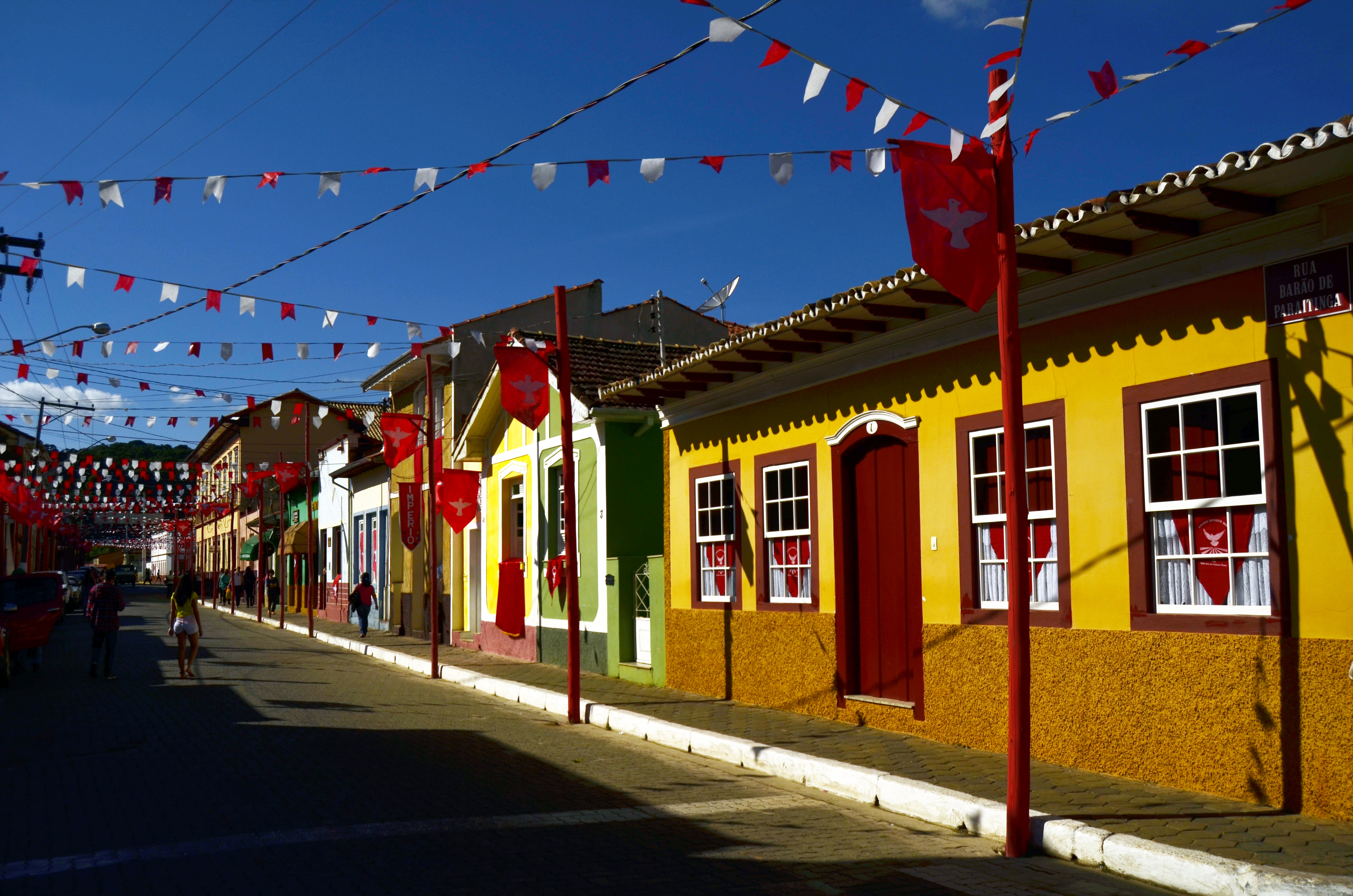
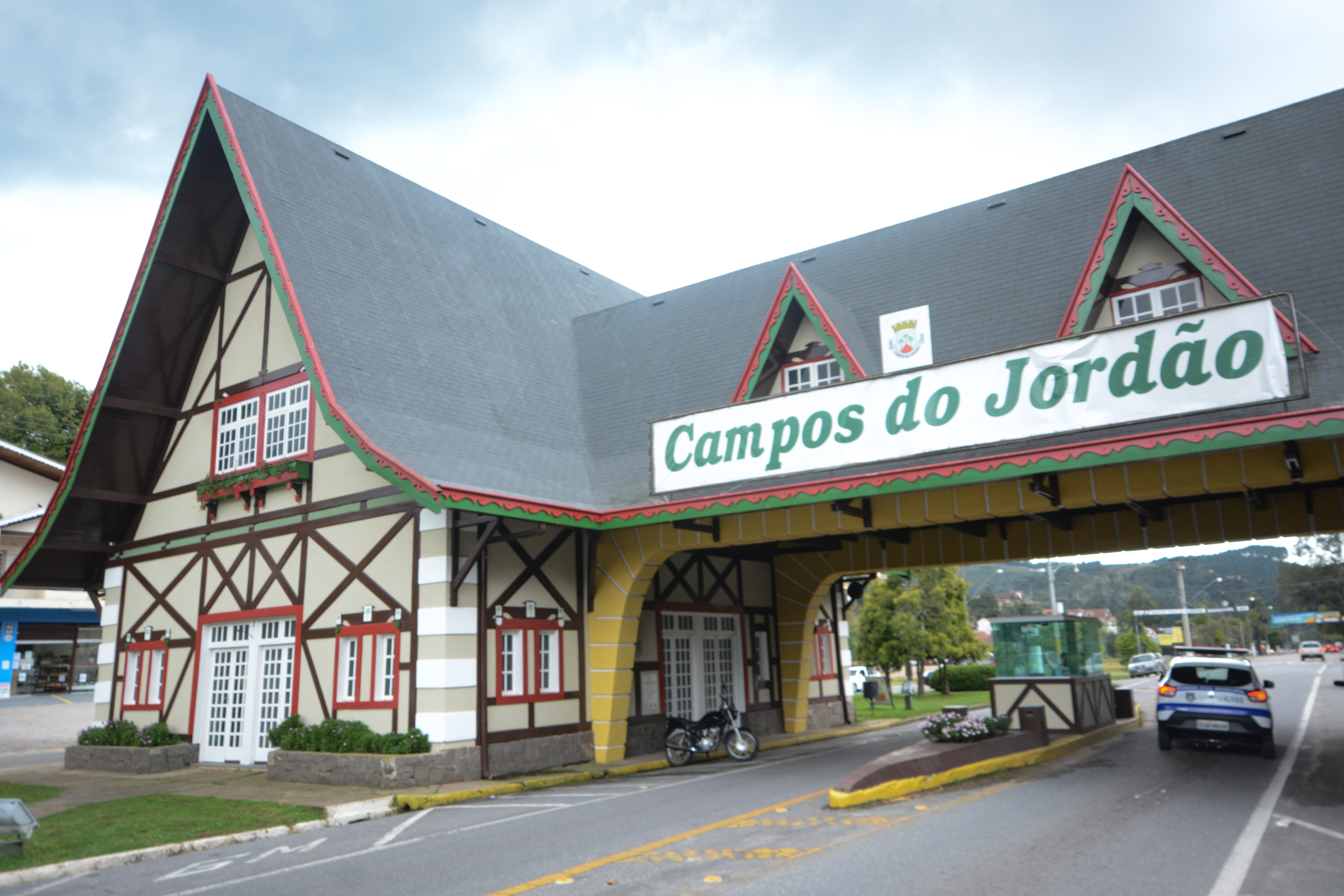
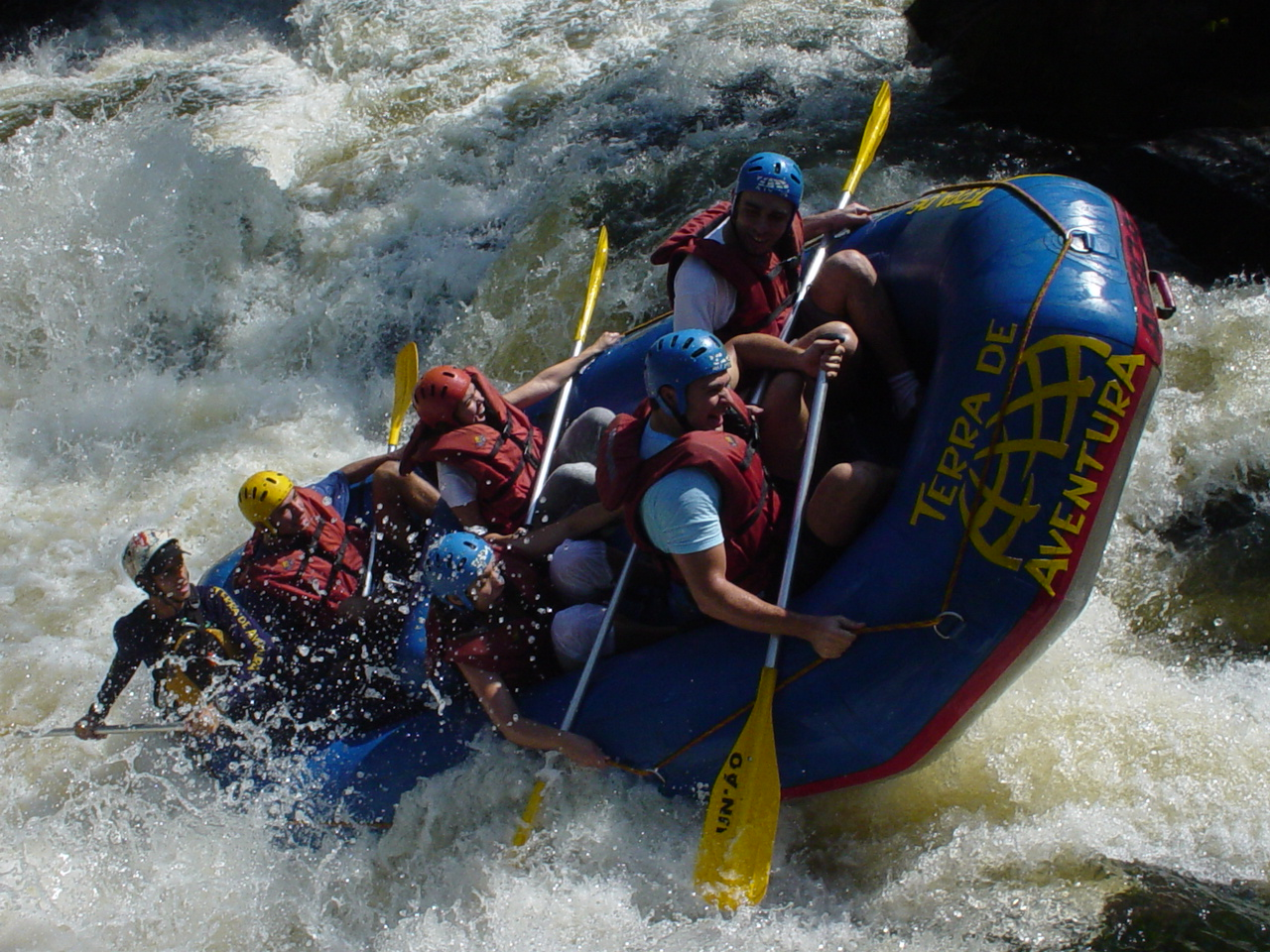
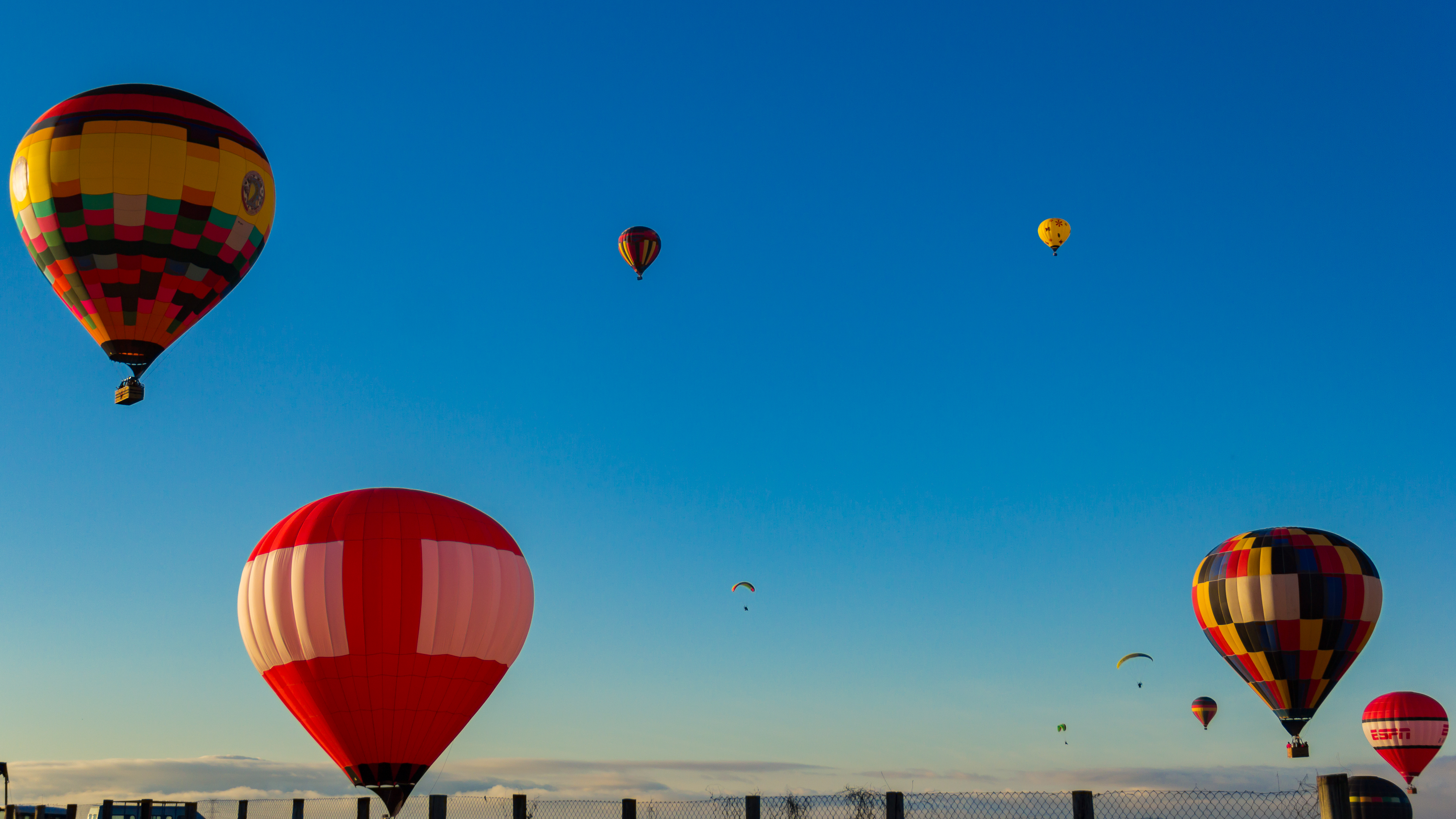
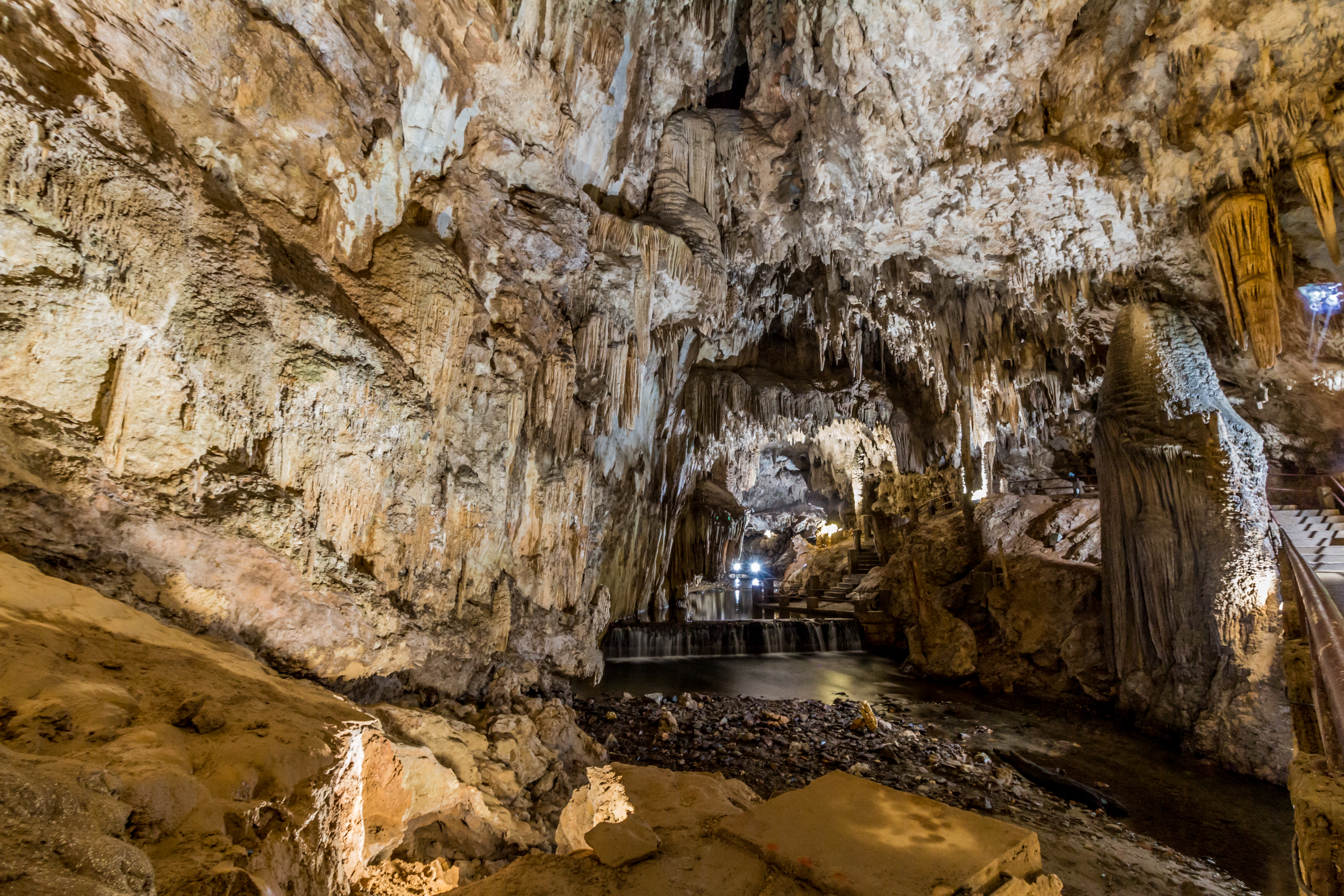
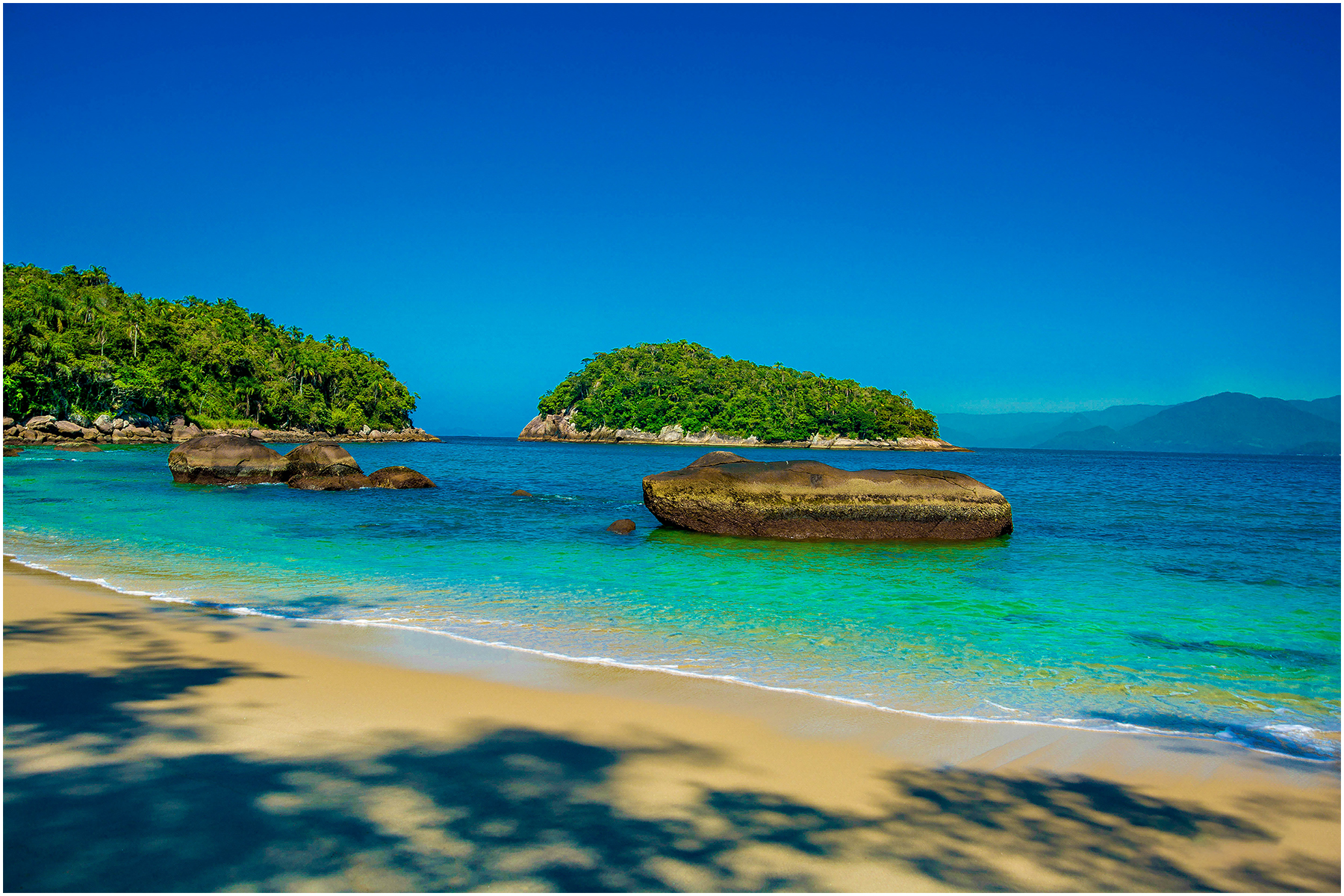
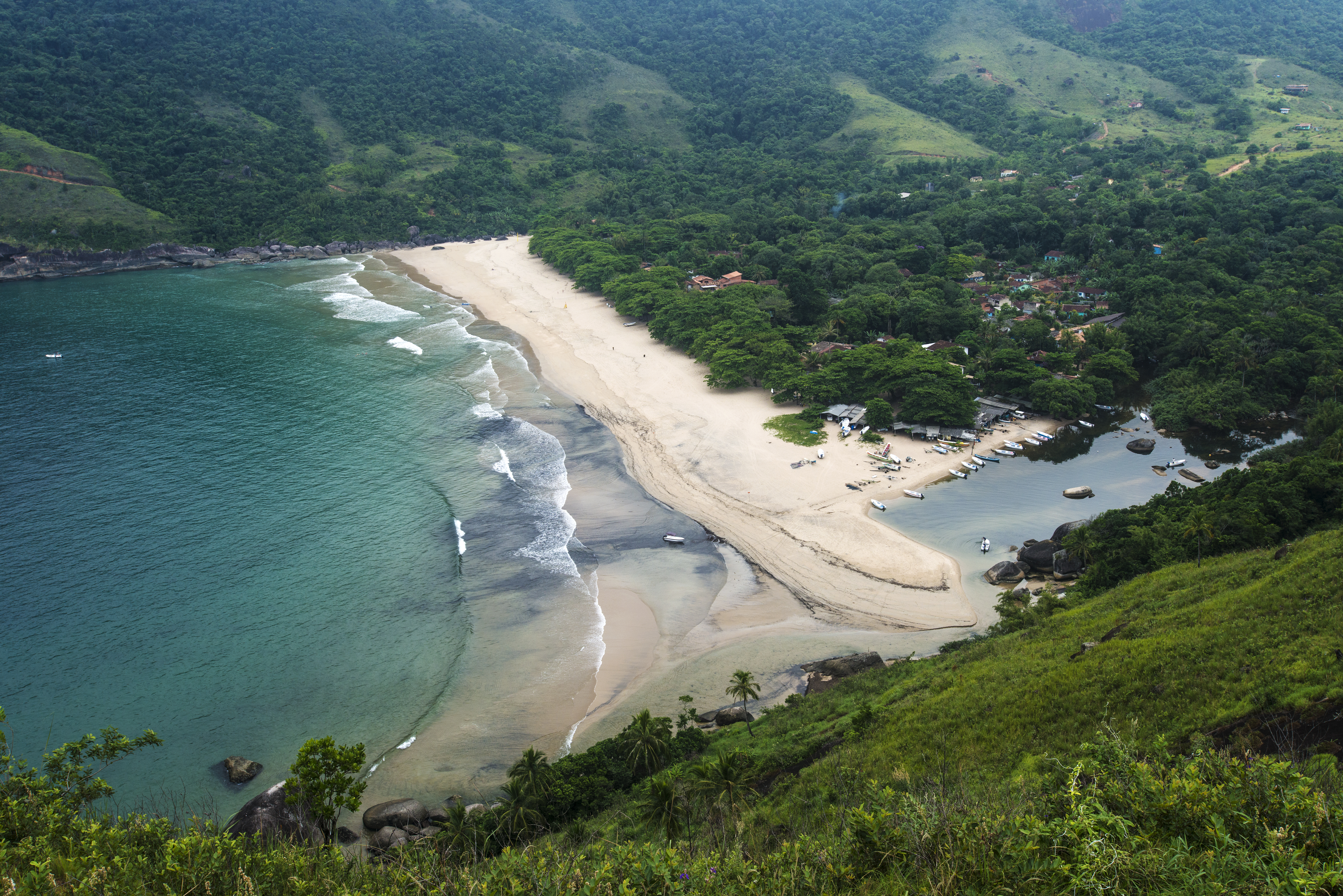
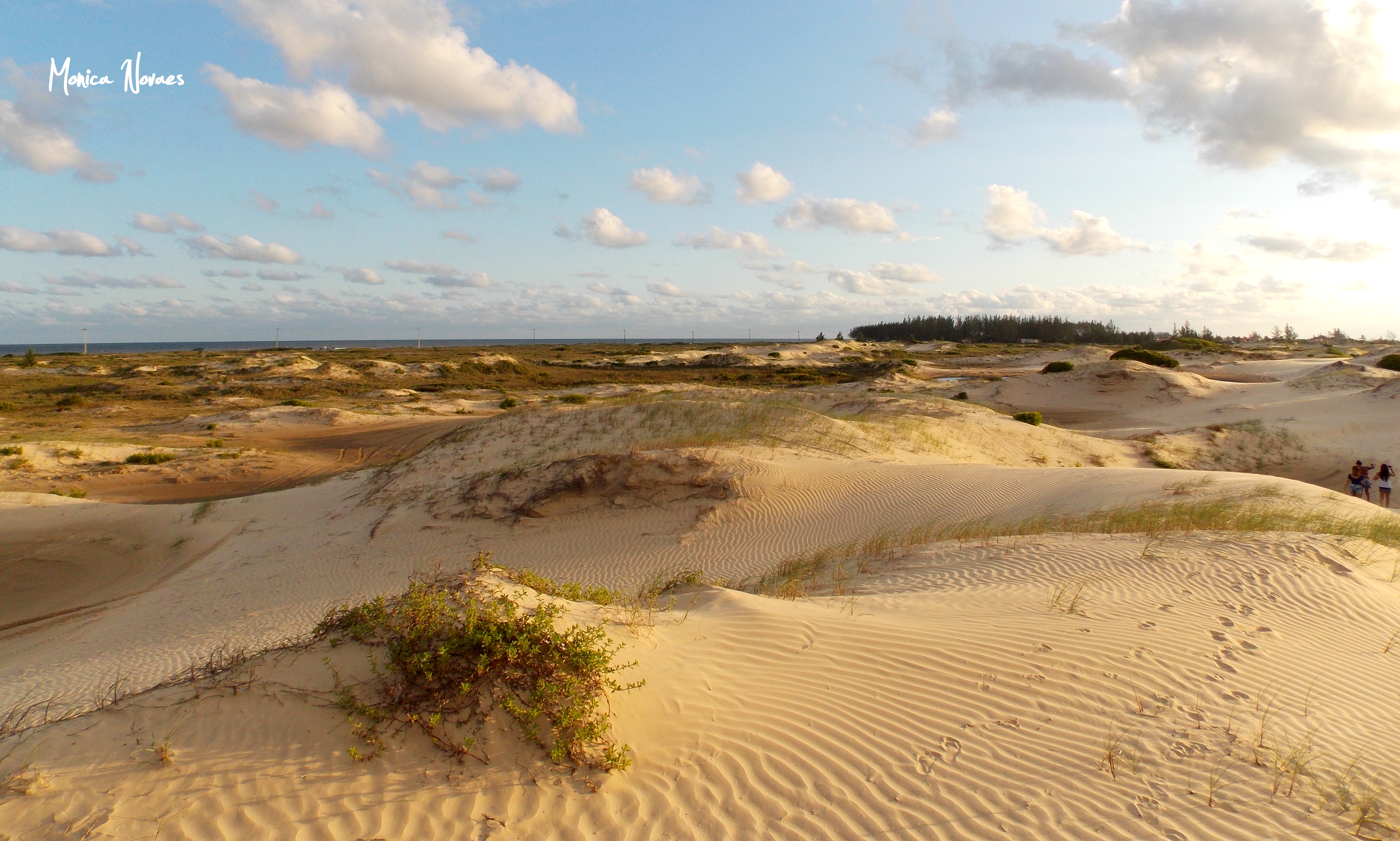
From top to bottom, and left to right: in the São Paulo City: Ibirapuera Park with the São Paulo Obelisk on the left; Avenida Paulista; MASP, and the Altino Arantes Building;
rest: Serra do Mar in Ubatuba, UNESCO World Heritage Site; Waterfall in the city of Águas de Santa Barbara; Araucária with the nucleus of the Milky Way in the background in Campos do Jordão; Center and Moinho Povos Unidos in Holambra; Historic Center of São Luiz do Paraitinga; city gate of Campos do Jordão; rafting in Brotas; ballooning in Boituva; Caverna do Diabo, in the Alto Ribeira Tourist State Park, considered a World Heritage Site by UNESCO; Ilha das Couves; Araçá Dunes in Ilha Comprida (another World Heritage Site), and Praia do Bonete

Tourism in the state of São Paulo is a large sector that serves millions of national and international tourists, representing 10% of its GDP, and stands out for being the most visited tourist hub in the country, its capital, São Paulo, is often the Brazilian city most sought after by national and foreign tourists, one of the ten most visited destinations in Latin America and the Caribbean and one of the 50 most visited cities on the planet, according to a Mastercard study. The state — the largest sending and receiving market (47 million) of tourists in the country — has multiple sites inscribed on the UNESCO World Heritage List and features cities or places of high cultural interest, offers various historical sites and attractions, monuments, museums and theaters, architecture, leisure, events, entertainment, business, natural beauty, diverse climate, rich culture and gastronomy, coastline with several beaches and caiçara culture, interior with numerous parks, canyons, abundance of water, rivers, waterfalls, swimming pools and natural reserves, thermal waters, ecotourism and tourist resorts, as well as rural and mountainous regions (where astrotourism is famous, and it is possible to see the Milky Way) that many appreciate for their beauty and tranquility, with typical caipira cuisine and culture, the which attracts visitors from different parts of the world.

Historical records about São Paulo's tourism date back to the 17th century, in the well-known travel reports about the territory of Brazil, which were made by explorers and travelers who examined new lands. However, the first known work written specifically about the São Paulo Province is "The trip to São Paulo in the summer of 1813" ("A viagem de São Paulo do verão de 1813"), by Gustavo Beyer; there, the author noted that "the Captaincy of São Paulo was considered a paradise in Brazil because of its altitude, its healthy and fresh air and its hospitable inhabitants". After this publication, many others of the genre appeared, such as the watercolor "The Navel of São Paulo" (1827), by Jean-Baptiste Debret, and works and/or reports by Augustin Saint-Hilaire (1819), Hércules Florence (1826) and Daniel Kidder (1837). During the 19th century, the movement of people within the national territory grew with the advent of new means of transport, mainly rail, and it was in the 20th century that São Paulo emerged as the main entry point for people in Brazil from different parts of the world due to its large supply of work, hotels, transport, leisure, entertainment and culture, as well as cities with a high quality of life, which was reflected (and still is reflected in the 21st century) in the large numbers of tourists. The capital was the scene of many of the country's main historical events. In the state, there are numerous cities, monuments and buildings listed by CONDEPHAAT, CONPRESP and IPHAN due to their importance as state and national historical heritage, as well as sites considered World Heritage and natural areas declared Biosphere Reserves of the Planet by UNESCO.

São Paulo has three tourism hubs: the capital, the coast and the interior. Known worldwide as the economic, financial and cultural center of Latin America and the "city that never sleeps", São Paulo city offers diverse tourism options, from business (which provides the city with around 45 thousand events per year, being the most visited city in the country) and shopping tourism to leisure tourism in Ibirapuera Park, for example, and ecotourism in waterfalls and conservation units considered World Heritage in Brazil. The south of the capital provides agroecology and sustainable tourism at the Ecotourism Hub of the Municipality of São Paulo. It also contains numerous museums that are among the best in the world, notably the São Paulo Museum of Art (MASP), and several restaurants that are also among the best, being one of the ten main gastronomic destinations on the planet (2022) and recognized as the "World Capital of Gastronomy". Furthermore, cultural tourism and events are highly sought after in famous theaters and cultural spaces, such as the Theatro Municipal, Pinacoteca, Memorial da América Latina, São Paulo Art Biennial, and São Paulo Fashion Week. Regarding historical and architectural tourism, the highlights include the Historic Center, Pátio do Colégio, Municipal Market, Luz Station, and iconic buildings and monuments in the country's history, such as Altino Arantes, Copan, Itália, Martinelli, Mirante do Vale, Hotel Unique, Conjunto Nacional, Octávio Frias de Oliveira Bridge, Catedral da Sé, Obelisk of São Paulo, Marco Zero, and Monumento do Ipiranga. In terms of sports, there are events at the Interlagos Circuit and the Morumbi, Neo Química Arena, and Pacaembu stadiums. LGBT tourism is also known in the capital, with the São Paulo LGBT Pride Parade being the largest in the world. São Paulo also has the largest Brazilian hotel chain.

In the interior of the state, there are also the most varied programs. It is known for its tourist resorts, municipalities that receive financial subsidies from the state government with the aim of promoting and encouraging tourism activities. These resorts are divided into four groups: tourist (32), spas (15), climate (12) and hydromineral (11). The interior is sought after for its climate — in cities such as Campos do Jordão, in winter, the city emerges as the main tourist reference state, with the Winter Festival and several other attractions in an environment where the temperature can drop down below 0 (zero) degrees (Celsius); Atibaia, Bragança Paulista, Santo Antônio do Pinhal, and São Bento do Sapucaí —, and also for offering diverse options for ecotourism, trails, adventure tourism and caving, mainly due to the fact that the state is home to 30% of the entire country's Atlantic Forest, with emphasis on the Alto Ribeira Tourist State Park (PETAR), Serra do Mar State Park and Southeast Atlantic Forest Reserves (World Heritage Site).

The interior also attracts tourists due to its parks with natural thermal waters and therapeutic properties in Águas de Lindóia, Águas de Santa Bárbara, Águas de São Pedro, Barretos, Ibirá, Lins and Olímpia (these cities are some of those considered "hydromineral resorts"), and amusement parks, including Hopi Hari, a major theme park in Brazil, in the Metropolitan Region of Campinas; Hot Beach and Thermas dos Laranjais, the most visited water park in Latin America and the fifth in the world (both located in Olímpia); Wet'n Wild, and Thermas Water Park. Hydrotourism in the Circuito das Águas (Water Circuit, regions where hydromineral resorts are located) is very popular, as well as enotourism in São Roque and São Miguel Arcanjo. Cities such as Piracicaba, Boituva, Sorocaba and Rio Claro are world famous for ballooning.

Rural destinations are among the most sought after by travelers visiting the state. With more than 1,200 registered rural properties and 10 gastronomic routes mapped across the state, São Paulo has become one of the main tourist destinations in the world. Furthermore, rural tourism and caipira culture, folklore and typical festivals are also part of the attractions of the interior, as well as historical buildings from the 16th, 17th and 18th centuries. Religious tourism is another sector that attracts people from different parts of the world, with the Basilica of Our Lady of Aparecida (Aparecida, the most important city for religious tourism in Brazil) and the Temple of Solomon (São Paulo) being widely visited.

The coastline of São Paulo state along the South Atlantic Ocean is the 5th longest in the country and, along its 622 km, has beaches and leisure options in the most diverse styles, being a national precursor of mass sun and beach tourism, with cities such as Guarujá, Ilhabela, Praia Grande, Santos, Ubatuba being some of the most desired in the country. Among the paradisiacal and most visited beaches in the state and which are often listed among the most beautiful and/or best in Brazil and the world (with Blue Flag certification), there are: Praia do Tombo, Praia Almada, Brava, Praia do Bonete, Calhetas, Camburi, Castelhanos, Cedro, Guaratuba, Enseada, Fazenda, Mococa, Pernambuco, Picinguaba, Barra do Sahy, Barra do Una, Juqueí, Ilha das Couves and Riviera de São Lourenço. Historical tourism is also very popular both on the coast and in the rest of the state due to its historical importance for the country, especially in Cananeia (considered one of the largest marine life nurseries on the planet), Itanhaém, Iguape, Paranapiacaba, Santana de Parnaíba, São Luiz do Paraitinga, São Vicente (the first village in Brazil), and Santos. On Ilha Comprida, declared a Biosphere Reserve by UNESCO, it is possible to find both natural reserves and dunes, the last in the state, in the Ilha Comprida Environmental Protection Area.

=== Historic sites ===
One of the most culturally and historically rich states in the country, São Paulo has several monuments and buildings listed by Condephaat and IPHAN.

Sertanista House, Casa do Sítio da Ressaca, Casa do Sítio Tatuapé, Sítio Morrinhos, Solar da Marquesa de Santos. Engenho dos Erasmos, Butantã's House.

== Infrastructure ==
=== Transport ===
The state of São Paulo has the most modern large-scale infrastructure in the country, being the only one equivalent to developed countries and the only one that, consequently, is capable of providing industrial diversity. Its road system is the largest among the federative units in Brazil. In November 2021, the state had, between federal, municipal and state highways, a network of 199,975 km (176,675 km municipal, 22,219 km state and 1,075 km federal) with 34,753 km paved, and of these, 6,346 km are double lane highways (2 lanes or more of traffic in each direction). With 654 km, the Rodovia Raposo Tavares (SP-270) is the longest highway in the state and connects the capital, where it begins in Butantã, to the west of São Paulo, extending to the border with Mato Grosso do Sul in Presidente Epitácio.

São Paulo's highways are considered the most modern and, compared to other Brazilian highways, the best in the country in terms of general state of conservation. The administration of some of them was transferred to the private sector from the end of the 1990s, within a broader privatization program. The winning companies in the bidding process were forced to make a series of investments and meet quality targets, but, despite the improvement in accident statistics, the charging of a toll considered high by Brazilian standards provokes criticism of the privatization model.

==== Airports ====
Every day nearly 100,000 people pass through São Paulo-Guarulhos International Airport (IATA: GRU, ICAO: SBGR), which connects Brazil to 28 countries. There are 370 companies established there, generating 53,000 jobs. The original airport's two terminals are designed to handle 20.5 million passengers a year, but the recently opened third terminal expanded the capacity for 42 million users.

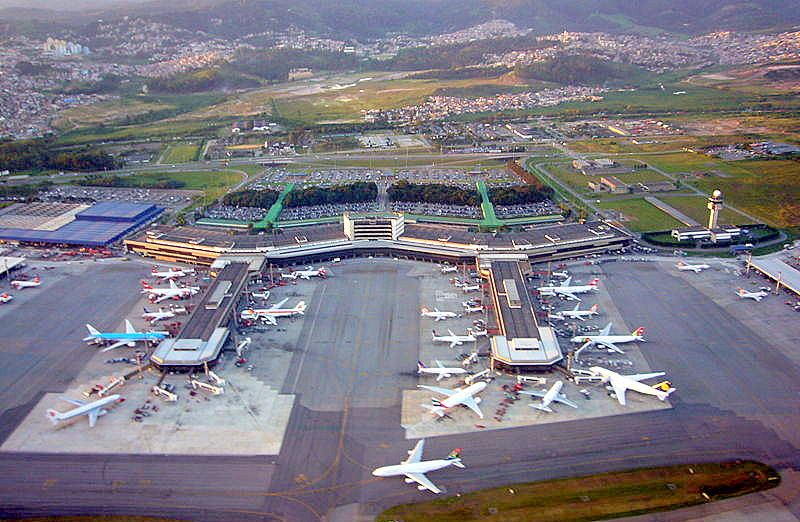
São Paulo-Guarulhos International Airport – the largest airport in the country and one of the busiest in the world

São Paulo International Airport is also one of the main air cargo hubs in Brazil. The roughly 100 cargo flights a day carry everything from fruits grown in the São Francisco Valley to medications. The airport's cargo terminal is South America's largest and stands behind only Mexico City's in all of Latin America. In 2013, over 343 thousand metric tons of freight passed through the container terminal.

São Paulo–Congonhas Airport or just Congonhas Airport (IATA: CGH, ICAO: SBSP) is one of São Paulo's three commercial airports, situated 8 kilometres (5 miles) from the city downtown at Washington Luís Avenue, in the Campo Belo district. It is owned by the City of São Paulo and managed by Infraero. In 2013, it was the busiest airport in Brazil in terms of aircraft movements and the second busiest in terms of passengers, handling 209,555 aircraft movements and 17,119,530 passengers.

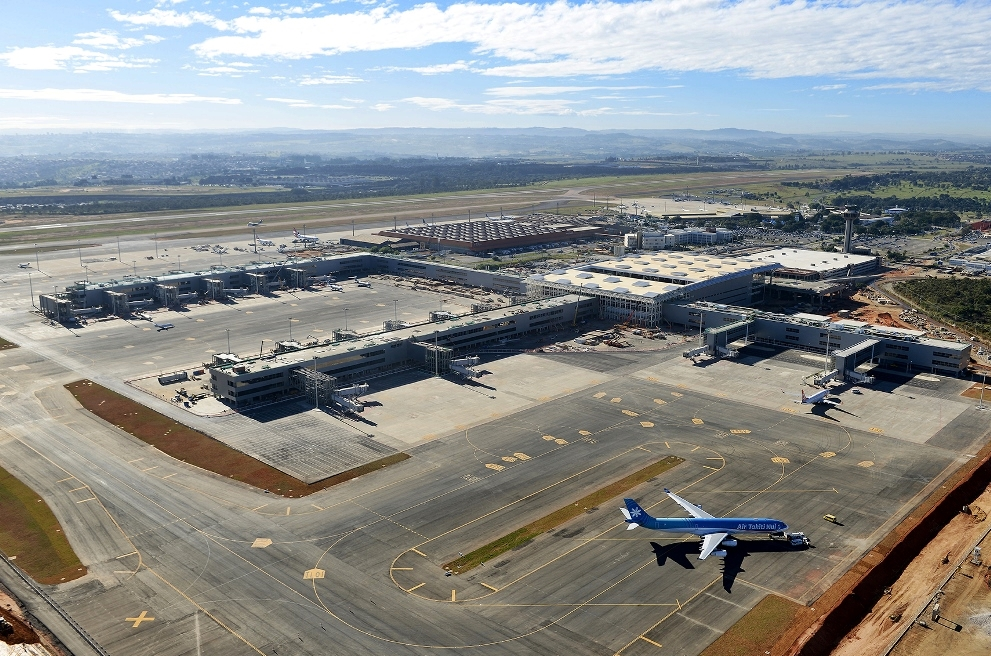
Viracopos International Airport in Campinas

Located 14 kilometers from downtown Campinas and 99 kilometers from the city of São Paulo, Viracopos-Campinas International Airport (IATA: VCP, ICAO: SBKP) can be reached by three highways: Santos Dumont, Bandeirantes and Anhanguera. The city of Campinas is one of Brazil's leaders in technology. Besides excellent highway connections, it is the location of major universities and many high-tech companies. Because of this, the airport is one of Infraero's highest investment priorities. The old "landing field" as it was called has become one of the main connection points in Latin America.

The air cargo import/export terminal of Campinas has an area of over 81,000 square meters. The airport began to concentrate in the international air cargo sector in the 1990s and today this is the airports leading source of revenue. Since 1995, Infraero has been investing to implement the first phase of the airport's master plan, making major improvements to the cargo and passenger terminals. The first phase was completed in the first half of 2004, when the airport received new departure and arrival lounges, public areas and commercial concessions. In 2012, the airport received a new terminal, it has since been privatized.

==== Railways ====
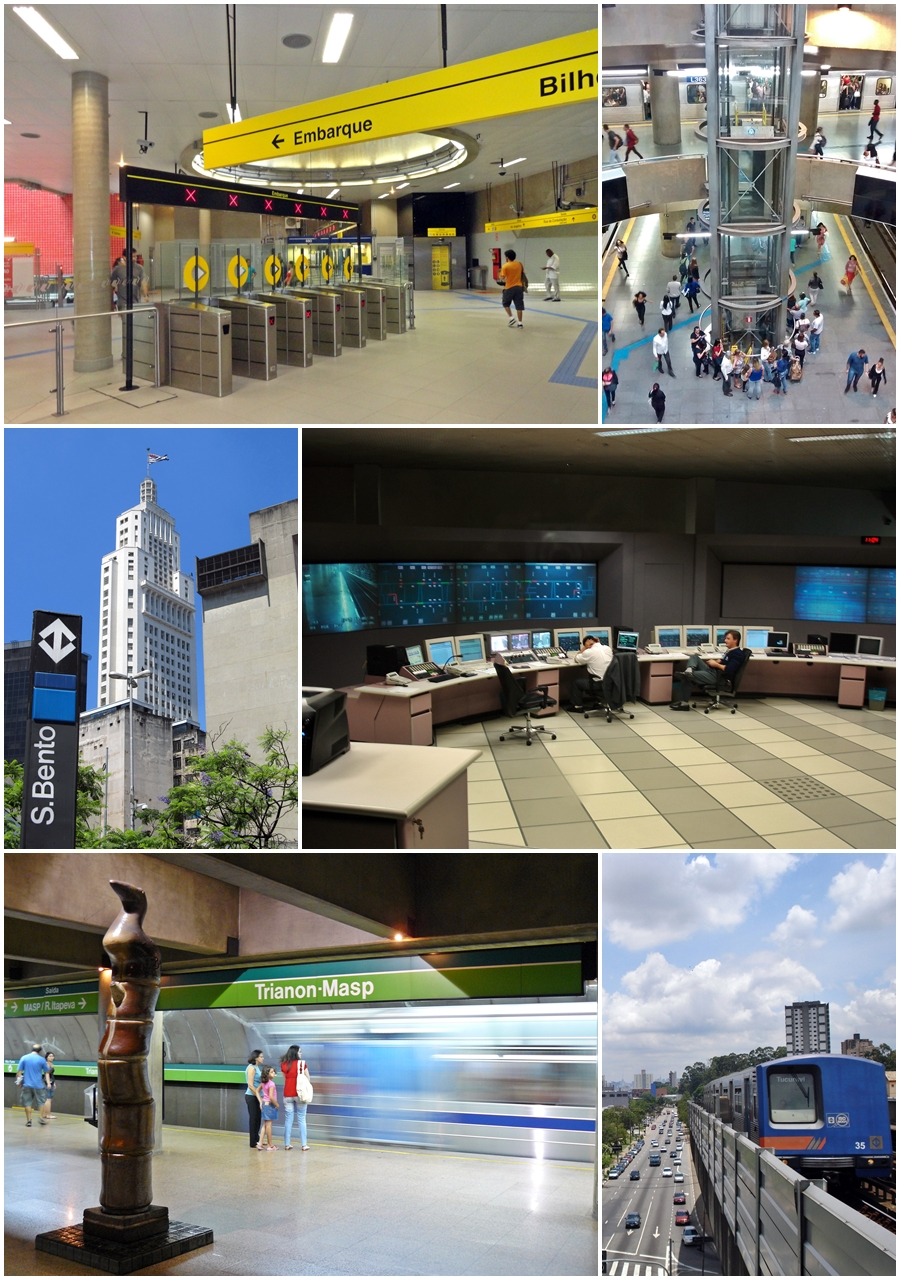
São Paulo Metro (subway) urban transit system, one of the best and cleanest metro systems in the world

In rail transport, the state has more than 5,000 km (3,100 mi) of railways, which comes from the banks of the Parana River on the border of São Paulo and Mato Grosso do Sul, to the Port of Santos, on the Atlantic coast, for the carriage of goods. The first of such urban transit systems in Brazil and South America, it began operations in 1974. It consists of four color-coded lines: Line 1-Blue, Line 2-Green, Line 3-Red and Line 5-Lilac; Line 4-Yellow started to work in May 2010, and will be completed only in 2016.

The metro system carries 2.8 million passengers a day. Metro itself is far from covering the entire urban area in the city of São Paulo. Another company, Companhia Paulista de Trens Metropolitanos (CPTM), ["São Paulo Metropolitan Train Company"] works along with the metro system and runs additional commuter railways converted into light rail service lines, which total six lines (numbers 7, 8, 9, 10, 11 and 12), 261 km long, serving 89 stations. Metro and CPTM are integrated through various stations. Metro and CPTM both operate as state-owned companies, and have received awards in the recent past as one of the cleanest systems in the world by ISO9001. The São Paulo metro transports three million people by day. A regional rail network is also proposed.

==== Highways ====
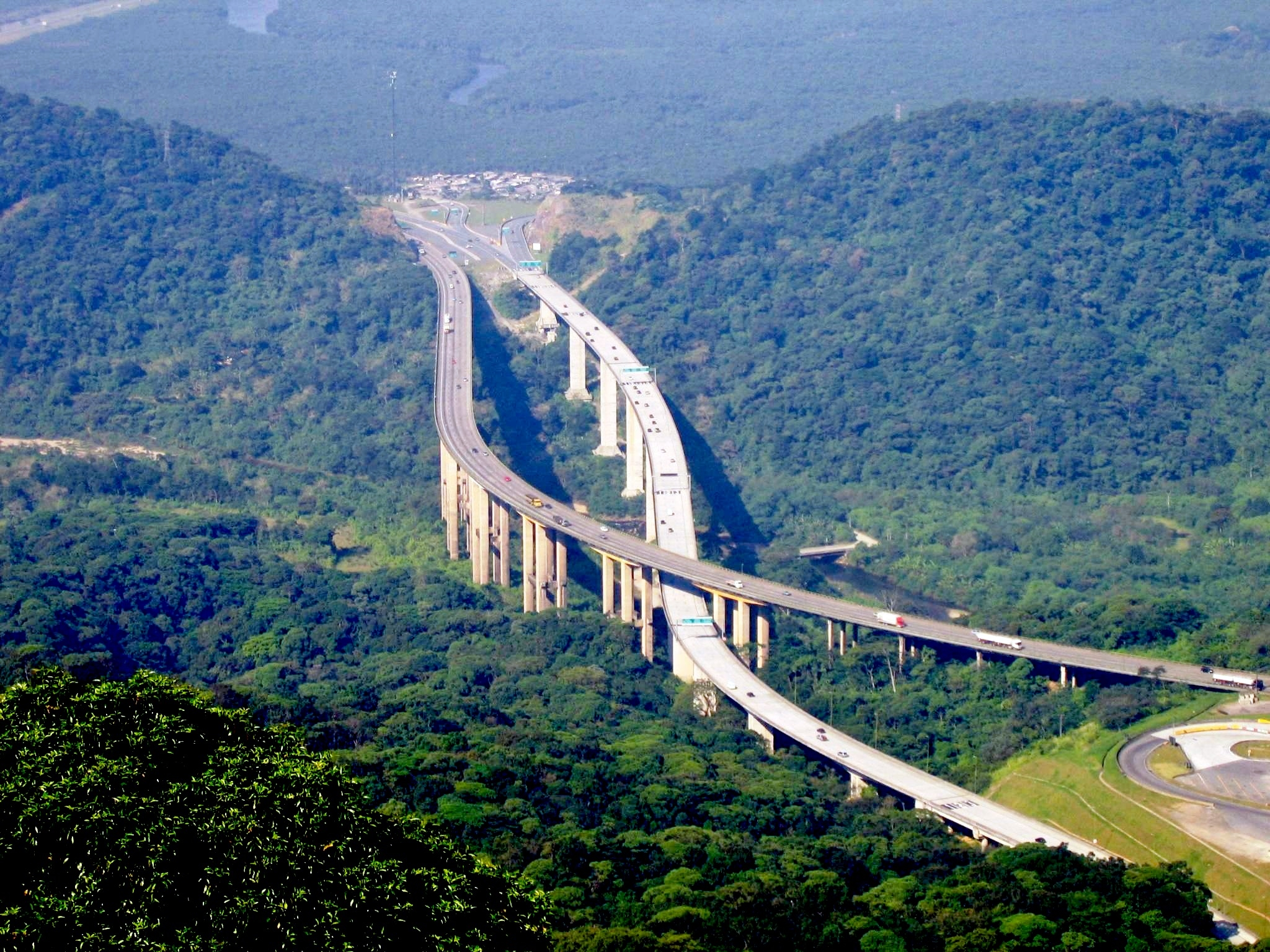
Rodovia dos Imigrantes (SP-160), considered one of the best highways in the country, crossing the Serra do Mar.

The highway system of São Paulo is the largest state system of the Brazilian Highway System, surpassing the 199,975 km (124,259 mi). It is an interconnected network, divided into three levels: municipal (176,675 km (109,781 mi)); state (22,219 km (13,806 mi)); and federal (1,075 km (668 mi)). More than 90% of São Paulo population is about 5 km (3.1 mi) from a paved road.

In November 2021, the State of São Paulo had, between federal, municipal and state highways, a network of 199,975 km (124,259 mi) with 34,753 km (21,595 mi) paved, and of these, 6,346 km (3,943 mi) are duplicated highways (2 lanes or more of traffic in each direction). São Paulo's highways are considered the most modern in the country and the state is the only one in Brazil which has a duplicated network with density at the level of a developed country, even with a better network than that of several European countries.

The State of São Paulo has more dual carriageways than any country in Latin America with the exception of Mexico, and, according to a survey by the Confederação Nacional do Transporte (National Transport Confederation), the road system of the state is the best in Brazil, with 59.4% of its roads classified as "excellent". The survey also found that of the 10 best Brazilian highways, nine are in São Paulo.

The São Paulo highway system, however, is heavily criticized for the high cost imposed on its users. The state of São Paulo concentrates more than half of the toll roads in Brazil and a new toll plaza is created every 40 days average. According to a report of the Folha de S.Paulo, the cost of tolls to travel the coastal path of 4,500 km (2,800 mi) of the federal highway BR-101, which connect Rio Grande do Norte to Rio Grande do Sul, is cheaper than to go through the 313 km (194 mi) of highways separating the municipalities of São Paulo and Ribeirão Preto. The prices charged by private concessionaires who run the system are frequent targets of complaints from drivers.

=== Ports ===
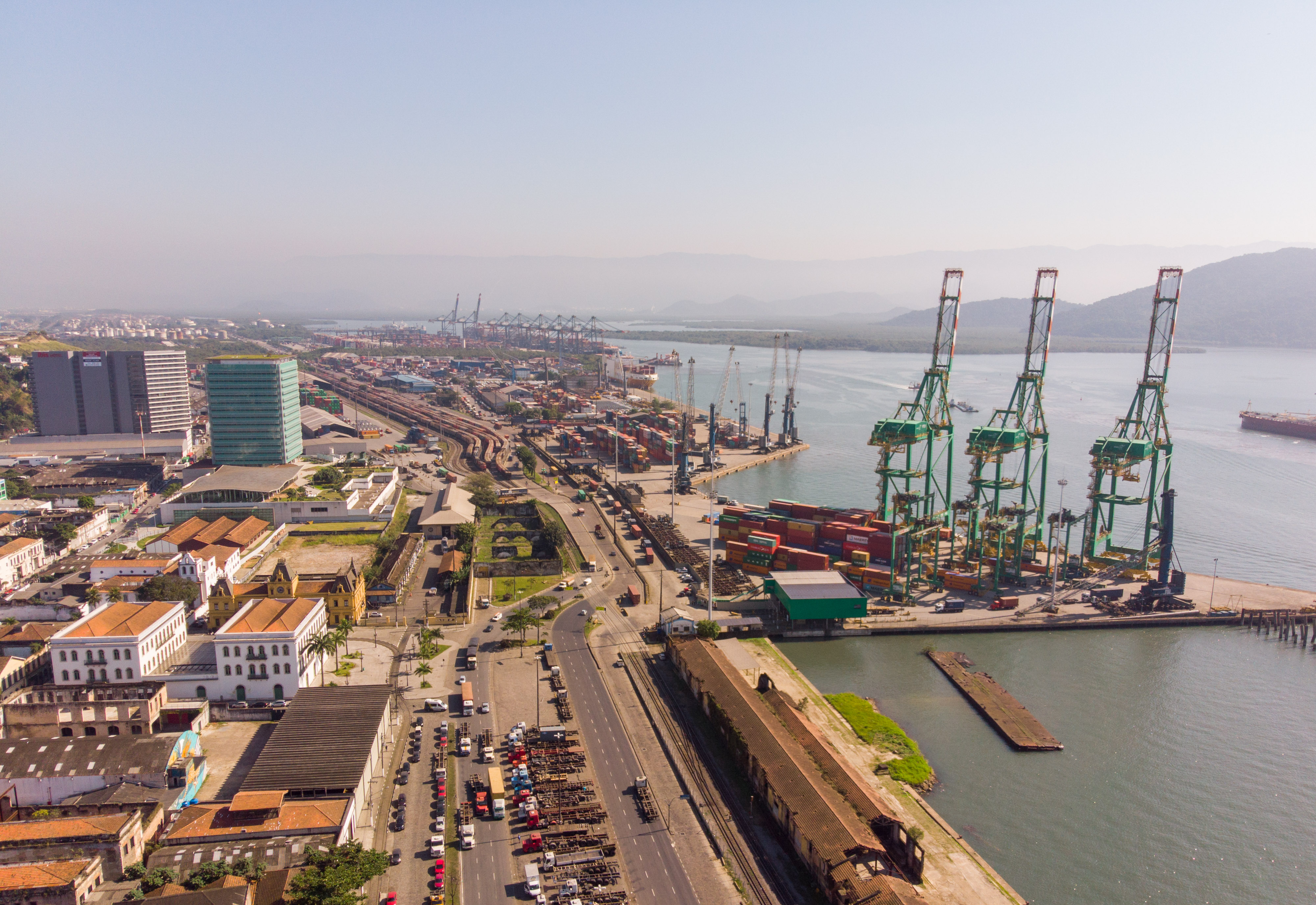
Port of Santos, the busiest in Brazil and one of the fifty largest ports in the world.

In maritime transport, the state of São Paulo has two major ports: the Port of Santos, located in municipality of Santos and occupies the 39th position in the world by containerized cargo; and the Port of São Sebastião, located in São Sebastião (San Sebastian) municipality.

== Sports ==
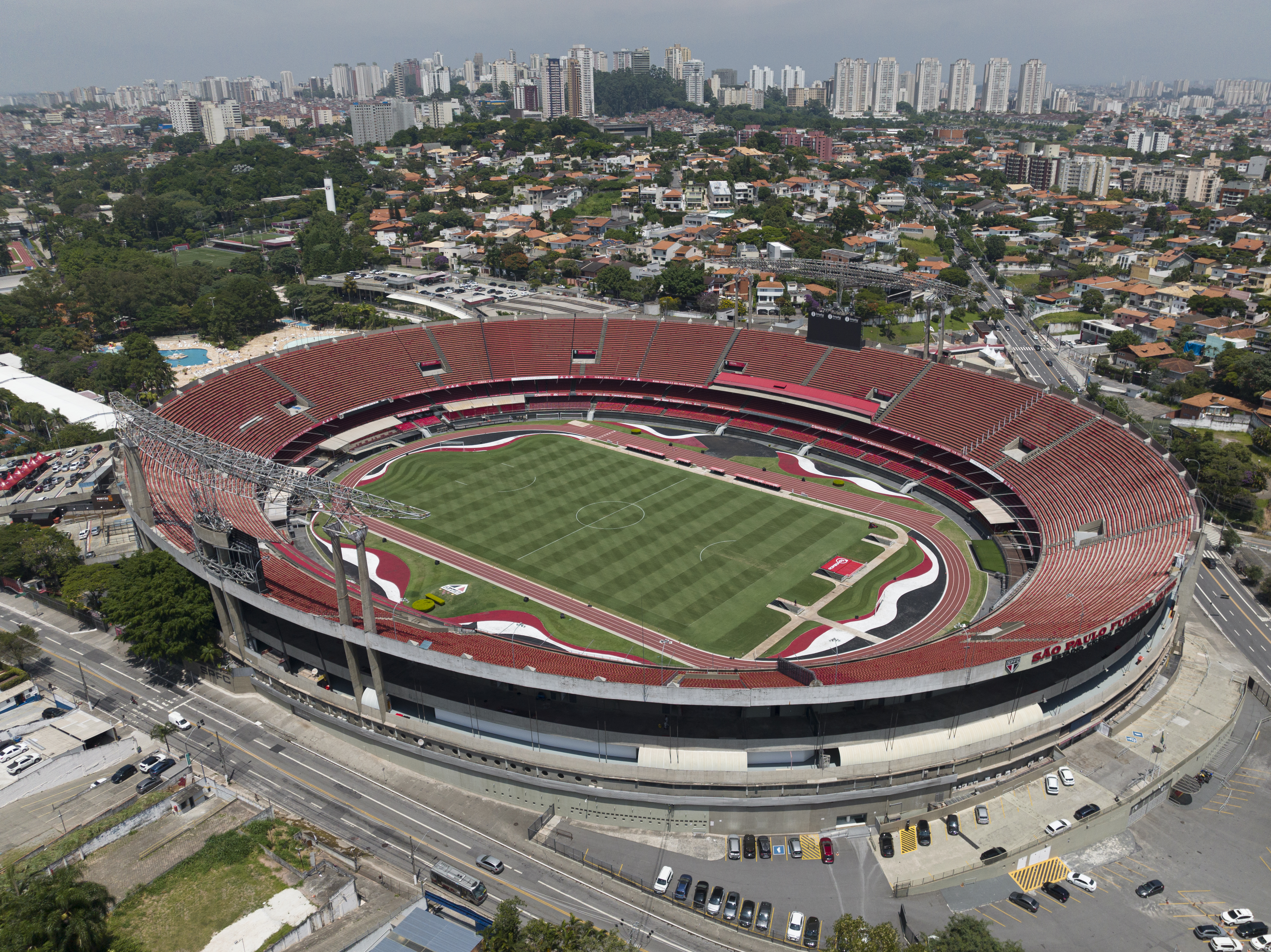
Morumbi Stadium.

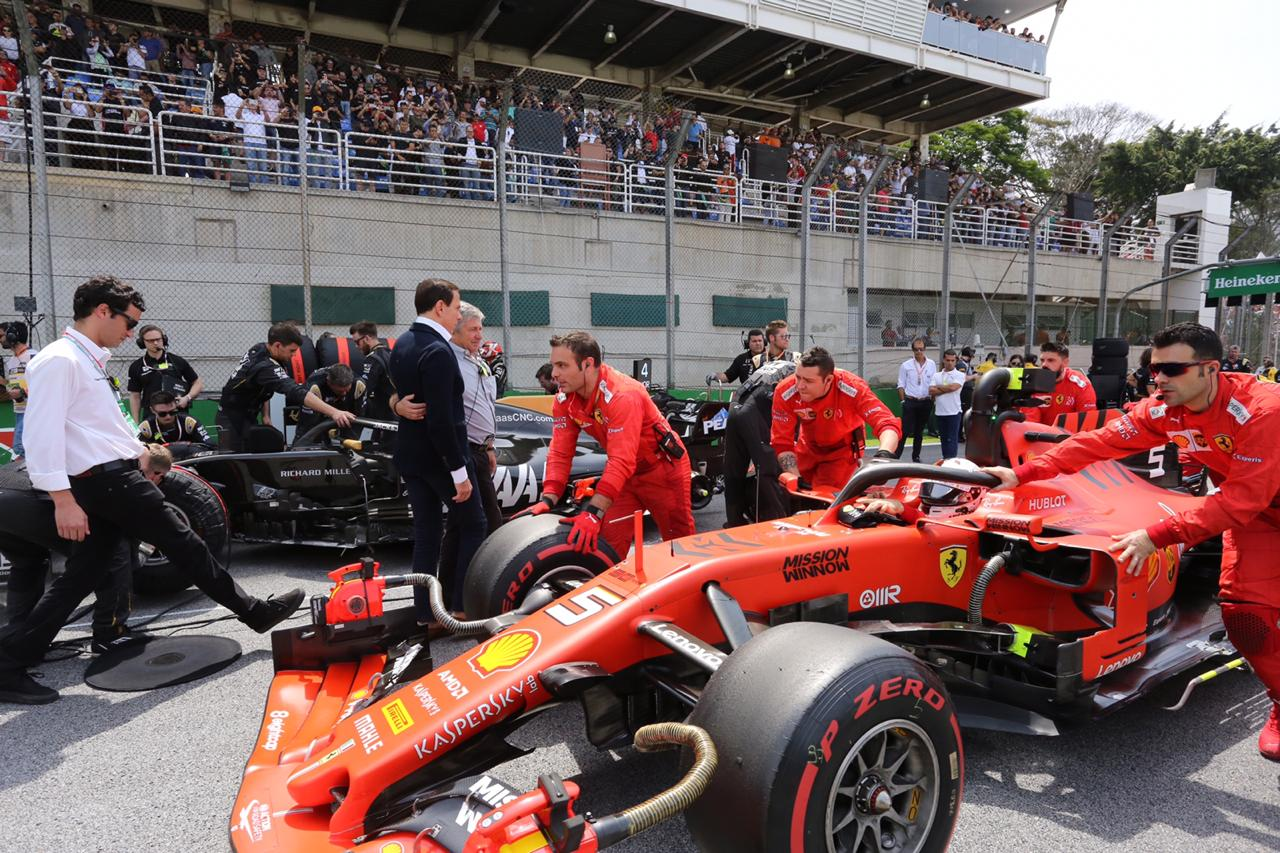
Brazilian Grand Prix in Interlagos.

Football is the most popular sport in the state. The biggest clubs from the state are Palmeiras, São Paulo, Santos, Corinthians, Ponte Preta, Guarani, Portuguesa, XV de Piracicaba. Other sports like Basketball and Volleyball are also quite popular. Most of the main athletes and sportsmen in the history of Brazil come from São Paulo, such as: Ayrton Senna, César Cielo, Oscar Schmidt, Hortência Marcari, Éder Jofre, Robert Scheidt, Emerson Fittipaldi, Aurélio Miguel, Rogério Sampaio, Alex Barros, Gustavo Borges, Ricardo Prado, Adhemar da Silva, João Carlos de Oliveira, Maurren Maggi, Fabiana Murer, Thiago Braz, Alison dos Santos, Arthur Zanetti, Rebeca Andrade, Rubens Barrichello, Felipe Massa and many others. The state has some of the strongest sports clubs and associations in the country, such as Pinheiros in multiple sports (swimming, athletics, volleyball, judo etc.) Unisanta in swimming, Osasco in volleyball, Franca in basketball, between others.

São Paulo hosted the opening game in the 2014 FIFA World Cup, that took place in Brazil.

=== Corrida de São Silvestre ===
The São Silvestre Race takes place every New Year's Eve in São Paulo. It was first held in 1925, when the competitors ran about 8,000 metres across the streets. Since then, the distance raced has varied, and it is now fixed at 15 km. Registration takes place from 1 October, with the maximum number of entrants limited to 15,000. In 1989, The São Silvestre Race became two races, the masculine and the feminine competition. There is also a children's race called São Silvestrinha.

=== Brazilian Grand Prix ===
The Brazilian Grand Prix (Portuguese: Grande Prêmio do Brasil) is a Formula One championship race which occurs at the Autódromo José Carlos Pace in Interlagos. In 2006 the Grand Prix was the final round of the FIA Formula 1 World Championship. The Spanish driver Fernando Alonso won the 2006 drivers championship at this circuit by coming second in the race. The race was won by the young Brazilian driver Felipe Massa, driving for the Scuderia Ferrari team.

== See also ==
- List of municipalities in São Paulo by HDI
- List of municipalities in São Paulo
- List of people from São Paulo
- List of São Paulo state symbols
- History of the state of São Paulo
- History of the city of São Paulo
- Interior of São Paulo
