= Solar da Marquesa de Santos =

18th-century manor house in São Paulo, Brazil

Coordinates: 23°32′55″S 46°37′56″W

Marquesa de Santos Manor
- Solar Marquesa de Santos
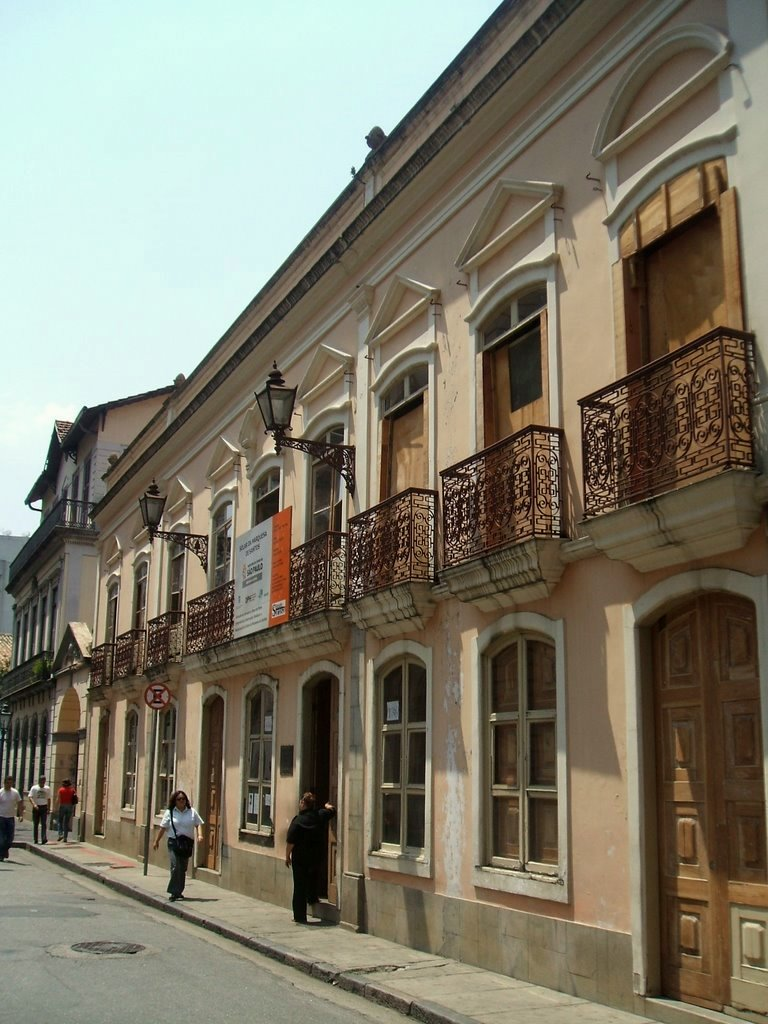
- Façade of the Marquesa de Santos Manor House
- Interactive map of the Marquesa de Santos Manor area

General information
- Location: São Paulo, Brazil, Brazil
- Completed: 18th century

Design and construction
- Awards: Listed property by the Council for the Defense of Historical, Archaeological, Artistic and Tourist Heritage (CONDEPHAAT)

The Solar da Marquesa de Santos is a manor house located in central São Paulo, Brazil, that hosts several cultural exhibitions and is currently the headquarters of the Cidade de São Paulo museum.

The residence, made of rammed earth blocks, was built around the second half of the 18th century. Between 1834 and 1867, the building served as a home for Domitila de Castro, Marchioness of Santos, who acquired the property from the heiress of Brigadier Joaquim de Moraes Leme after the break in her relations with Pedro I of Brazil.

In 1880, it was put up for auction and bought by the Diocesan Mitra, which installed the Episcopal Palace there. The entity carried out several works on the site, resulting in modifications to the structure.

Between 1909 and 1967, the building was used by the São Paulo Gaz Company, which made other changes in the building until it was expropriated by the City Hall. In 1971, the manor was declared a historical monument of the State of São Paulo and named a municipal heritage. In 1975, it became the headquarters of the Municipal Secretary of Culture.

Because of the many changes in its structure, the building had to undergo two restorations, the first in the 1960s and the second in 1990. The second floor still preserves the original walls of rammed earth and wattle and daub from the 18th century.

== History ==
The first references in documents to the Solar da Marquesa de Santos are dated between 1739 and 1754, which show the existence of four houses at do Carmo Street (currently Roberto Simonsen Street) belonging to André Alvares de Castro. According to the records of that century and the architectural analysis made by the Departamento do Patrimônio Histórico (DPH), two of these houses were probably joined, which would have originated the manor house.

Brigadier José Joaquim Pinto de Morais Leme received the building as payment for debts in 1802.

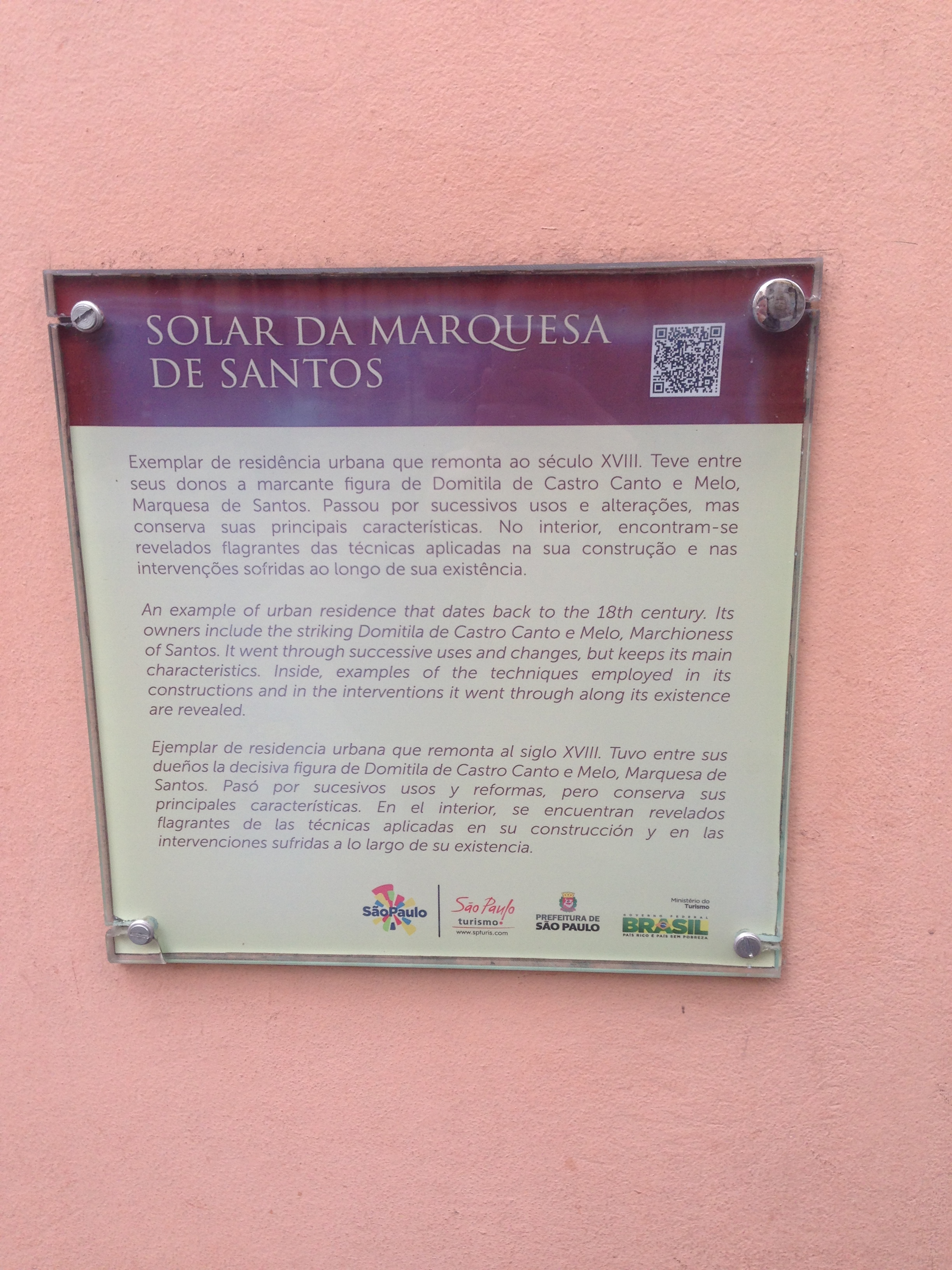
Manor house information sign

When she returned from Rio de Janeiro and after the end of her relationship with Pedro I, Domitilla de Castro acquired from the Brigadier's heiress house number 3 at do Carmo Street, for eleven contos and four hundred thousand réis, and made several changes in the building during the time she owned it, between 1834 and 1867. Because of the famous parties, soirees, and balls held by the Marchioness, the residence came to be called Palacete do Carmo ("Carmo Palace"), and became known as one of the most aristocratic properties in São Paulo. With the death of Maria Domitilla in 1867, the property ownership passed to her son, Commander Felício Pinto de Mendonça e Castro.

In 1880, the residence was put up for auction and bought by the Diocesan Mitra, which installed the Episcopal Palace and made reforms to the structure, such as the construction of a chapel and a crypt under the main altar. It was probably during this period that the façade of do Carmo Street gained the neoclassical feature that is maintained until today.

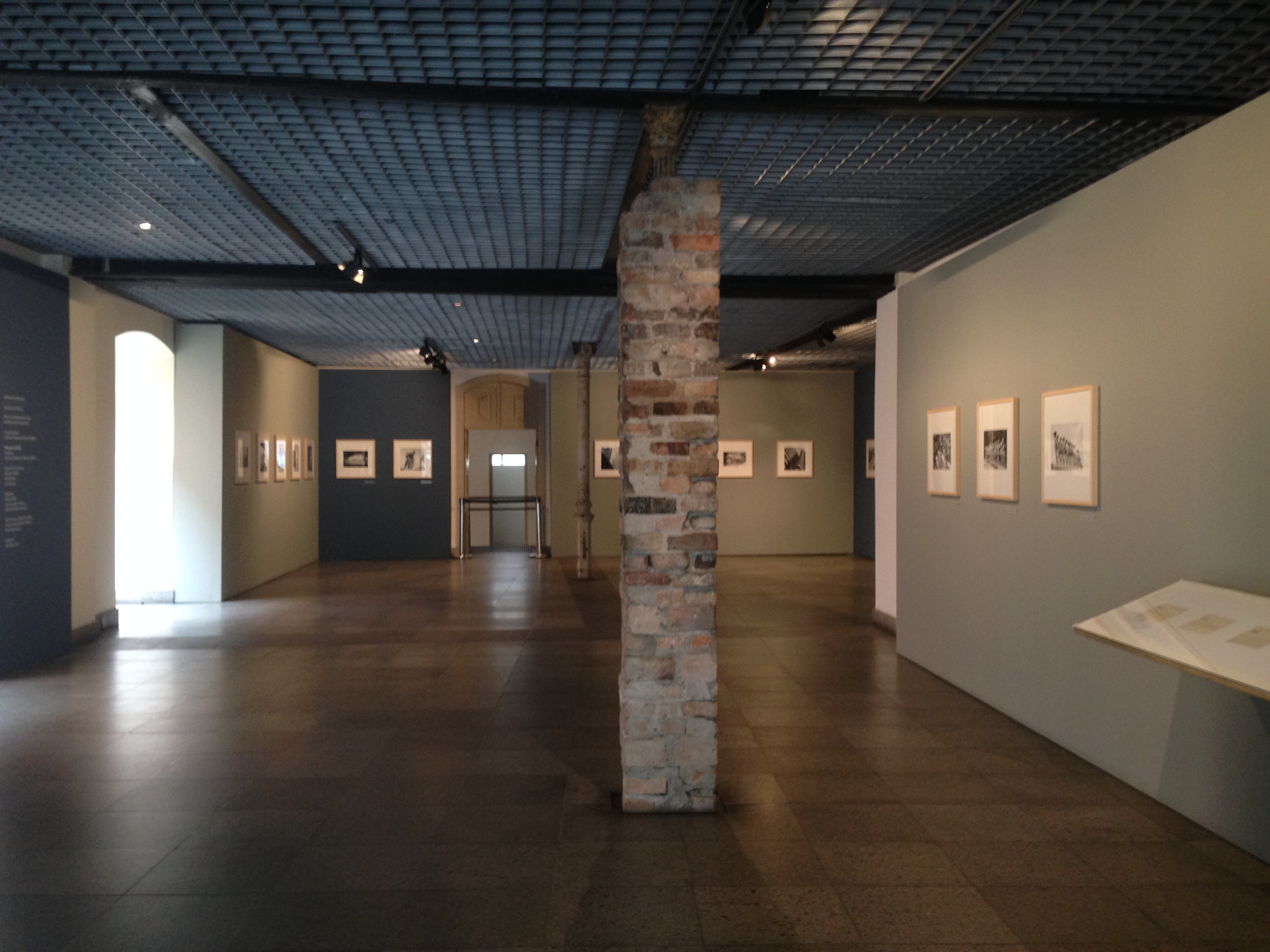
Hall of the Solar Marquesa de Santos

In 1909, the property was bought by The São Paulo Gaz Company, which set up its offices there. To adapt to its new use, the house underwent new modifications and was expanded: Walls were demolished and the windows and doors were transformed into storefronts. In order to improve lighting and ventilation, a patio was opened on the right side of the lot, changing the design of the roof. A skylight was also introduced in one of the rooms on the second floor in 1916.

In 1934, the first of the annexes was built, and five years later, the rest, completely altering the rear façade. Internal changes were made, such as the introduction of stairs, elimination, and addition of openings.

In 1965, a new intervention aimed to recover the colonial characteristics of the property: The main façade was recomposed, taking the features used today. The storefronts on the main façade were eliminated, and the series of three openings on the first floor, under the largest balcony, was restored to accommodate the use of the store of the Companhia Paulista de Gás (formerly The São Paulo Gaz Company). After two years, the city government expropriated the Gas Company and kept all its properties, including the manor house.

On June 15, 1971, the Solar da Marquesa de Santos was listed as a historical monument of the State of São Paulo and incorporated into the municipal heritage. In 1975, it became the headquarters of the Municipal Secretariat of Culture and the newly created Department of Historical Heritage (DPH).

=== Restoration works ===
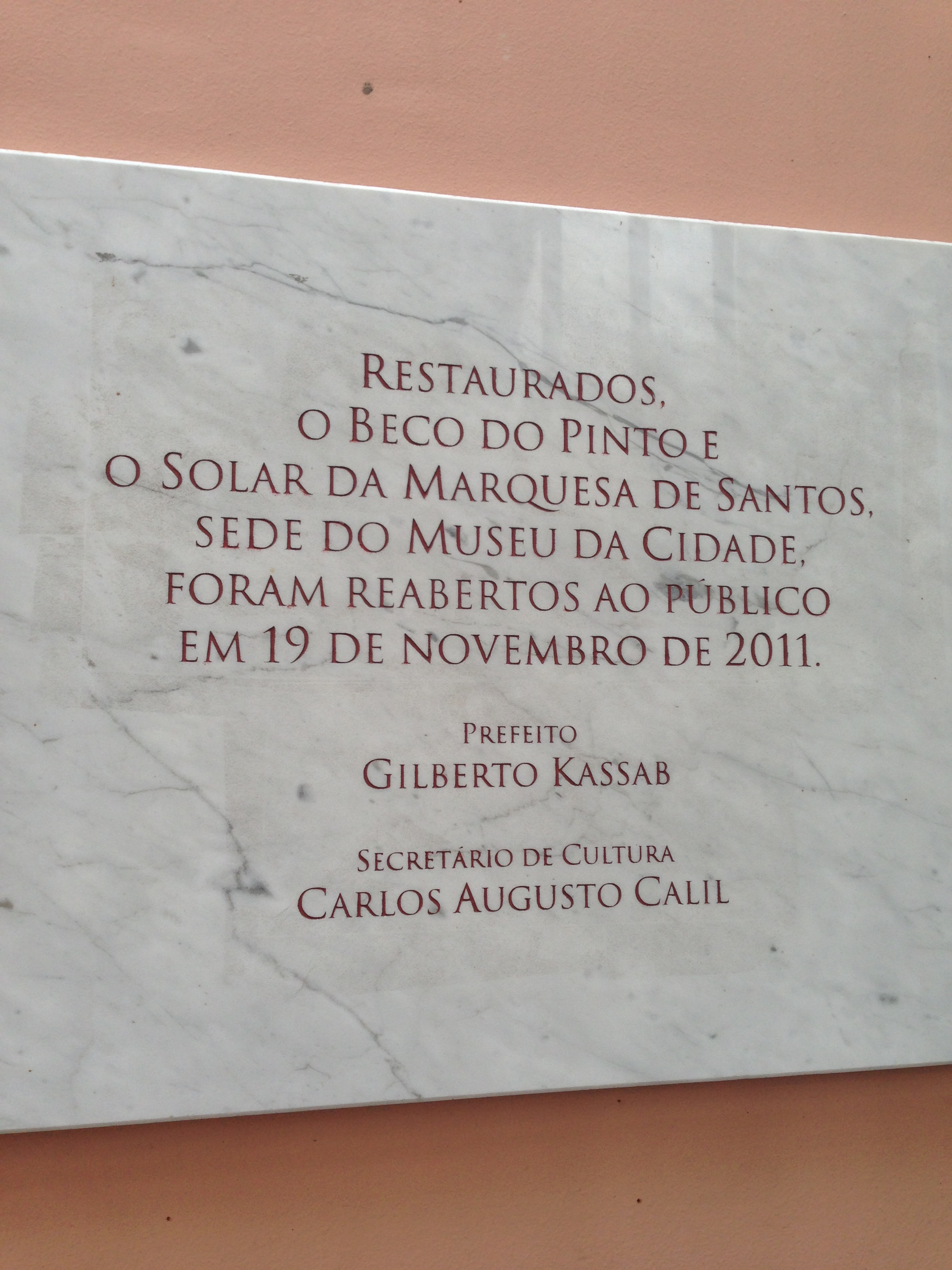
Plaque for the reopening of the Solar Marquesa de Santos.

The adaptations made to the building during the various uses of the site caused its original features to be modified. Because of this factor, in 1991 restoration work was carried out based on an analysis of the building's constructive evolution. The restoration preserved the characteristics of the various modifications made during the construction. The environment of the first floor was preserved, the traces of the sidewalk used in the 18th century were preserved in the inner courtyard, and the interventions made during the 1960s were undone and demolished. Still during the restoration phase, the wattle and daub and rammed earth walls were preserved and left exposed, as well as some paintings and floors. To finish the restoration, the neoclassical features of 1965 were maintained on the façade.

The manor house underwent two more restorations, in 1996 and between 2008 and 2011. After the restoration process was completed, the residence was reopened to the public on November 19, 2011, and it is still possible to find some utensils, such as a bed, mirror, and a lounger used by the Marchioness.

== Architectural Features ==
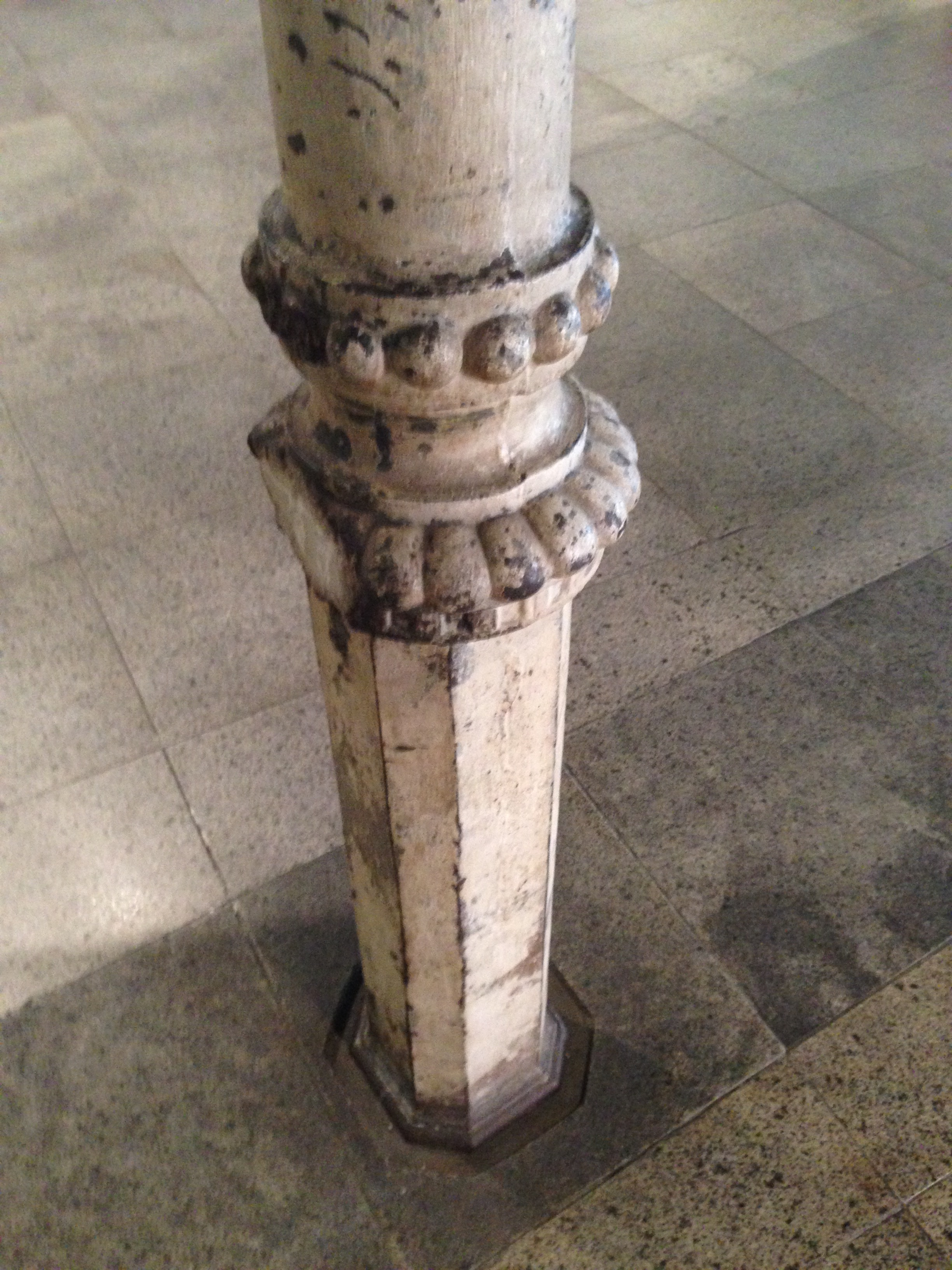
Column of the Solar Marquesa de Santos

The Solar da Marquesa de Santos is seen as one of the rare examples of an urban residence characteristic of the XVIII century. The building maintains the architectural characteristics resulting from the many renovations carried out over the centuries. Some of the original characteristics of the construction can be found on the site, such as the rammed earth walls and some concrete and brick masonry structures. The house is composed of a two-story main building on Roberto Simonsen Street and also has five-story annexes facing Bittencourt Rodrigues Street, built in the 1930s and 1940s.

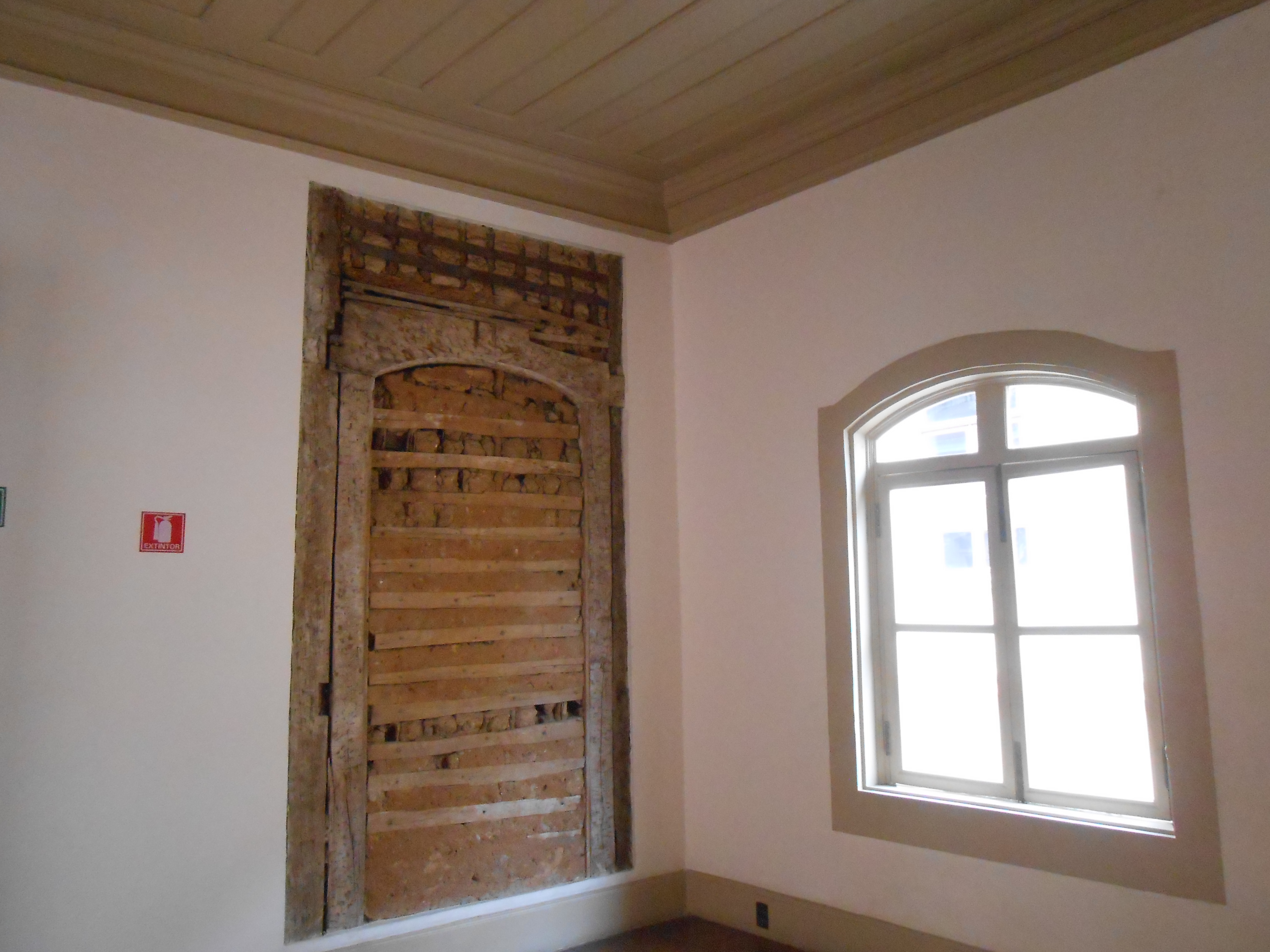
Original wall in rammed earth.

The main façade maintains the neoclassical composition of the nineteenth century, with fronts, balconies concealing the ceramic tile roof, framed openings, and balconies in detailed metalwork. All the openings of the residence keep padded wooden frames, and the balcony doors also have wooden shutters and, like the windows, are externally followed by wooden frames with glass panes.

On the first floor, it is possible to see the changes made in the twentieth century, such as the granite floor, with demarcations of the foundations discovered in the archaeological excavations, and the modular aluminum ceiling. The second floor maintains more ancient characteristics, such as the vestiges of mural paintings, and the floorboards and panels with gilding.

== Historical and cultural significance ==
The Solar da Marquesa de Santos building is located near the Pátio do Colégio, the place where the city of São Paulo began and was founded. Thus, the Solar da Marquesa de Santos is seen today as the oldest and main example of urban housing in São Paulo. Even after undergoing many changes in its structure, many of the original features are still preserved, which brings to the house a great historical and cultural significance linked to the 18th century.

Visitors to the Solar can find on-site furniture and household utensils that were used by the Marchioness de Santos herself, such as her bathtub, a piano, and portraits done by artists of the time. The museum's collection also features photographs of the city at the time of its construction.

=== Listing ===
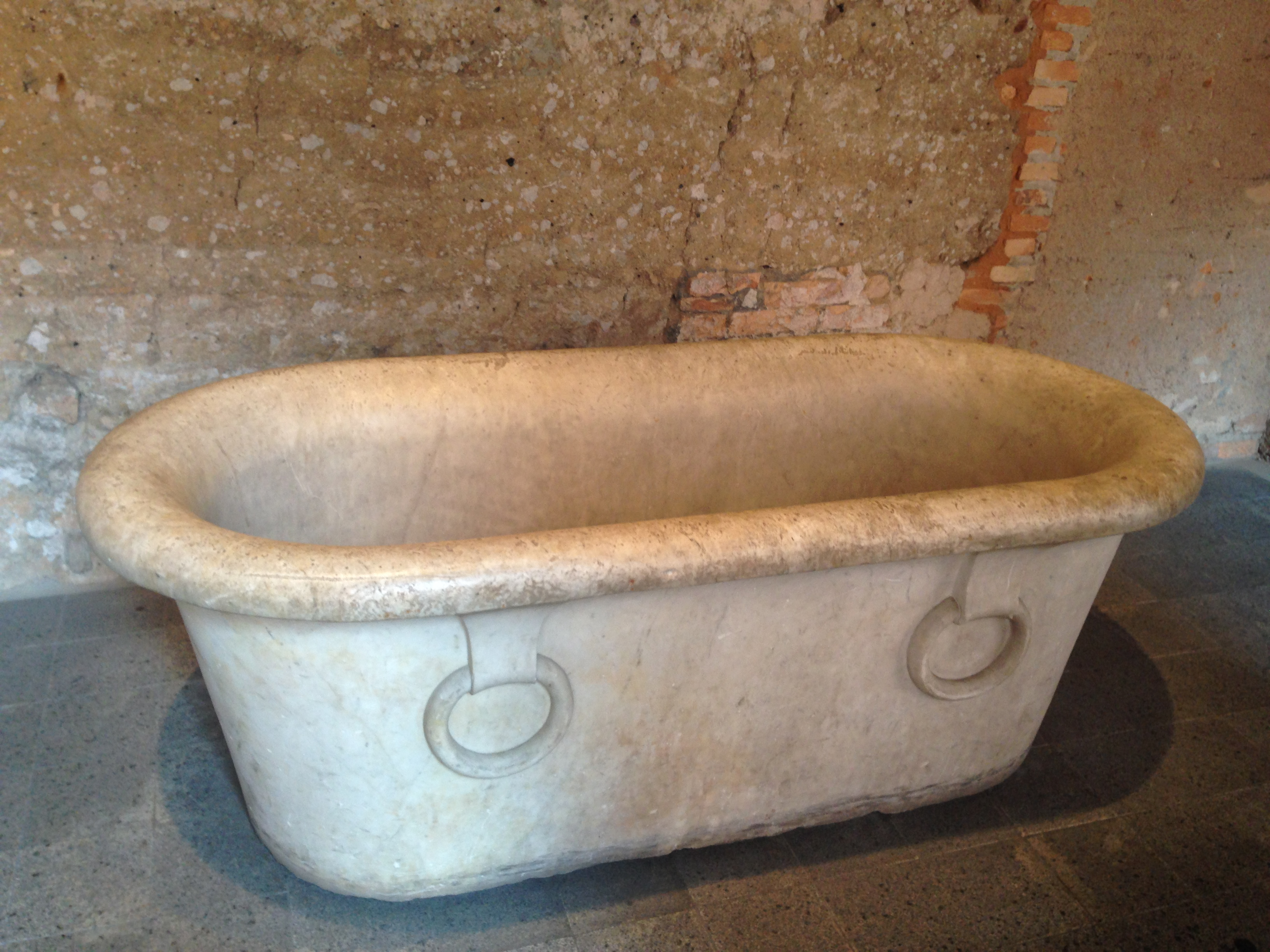
The bathtub used by Domitila de Castro

Through the Resolution of 06/14/1971 of the Council for the Defense of Historical, Archaeological, Artistic and Tourist Heritage (CONDEPHAAT), the listing of the Solar da Marquesa de Santos as a historical monument was published in the Diário Oficial of the State of São Paulo on June 15, 1971.

The complete document with the process of listing the heritage site is scanned and available for consultation online. Also available are the processes with the request for restoration of the manor house from 1988 and 2003.

=== Tableware from Solar da Marquesa ===
The porcelain fragments found during the excavations were divided into three groups: The first as a result of the landfill made at the site, the second possibly from the residents of the manor house, and the third, a small group but created by presenting fragments discrepant from the rest found at the site. The fragments from the first group, related to the landfill, are estimated to be from 1700 to 1840, mainly due to the absence of decorative types on the pieces analyzed. The second group contains fragments of European porcelain from the late 19th century and Brazilian porcelain from the 20th century. The third group has a suggested dating of the 19th century, with the presence of one fragment of Portuguese faience and one of Chinese porcelain, in addition to 5 fragments of European porcelain.

== Current state ==
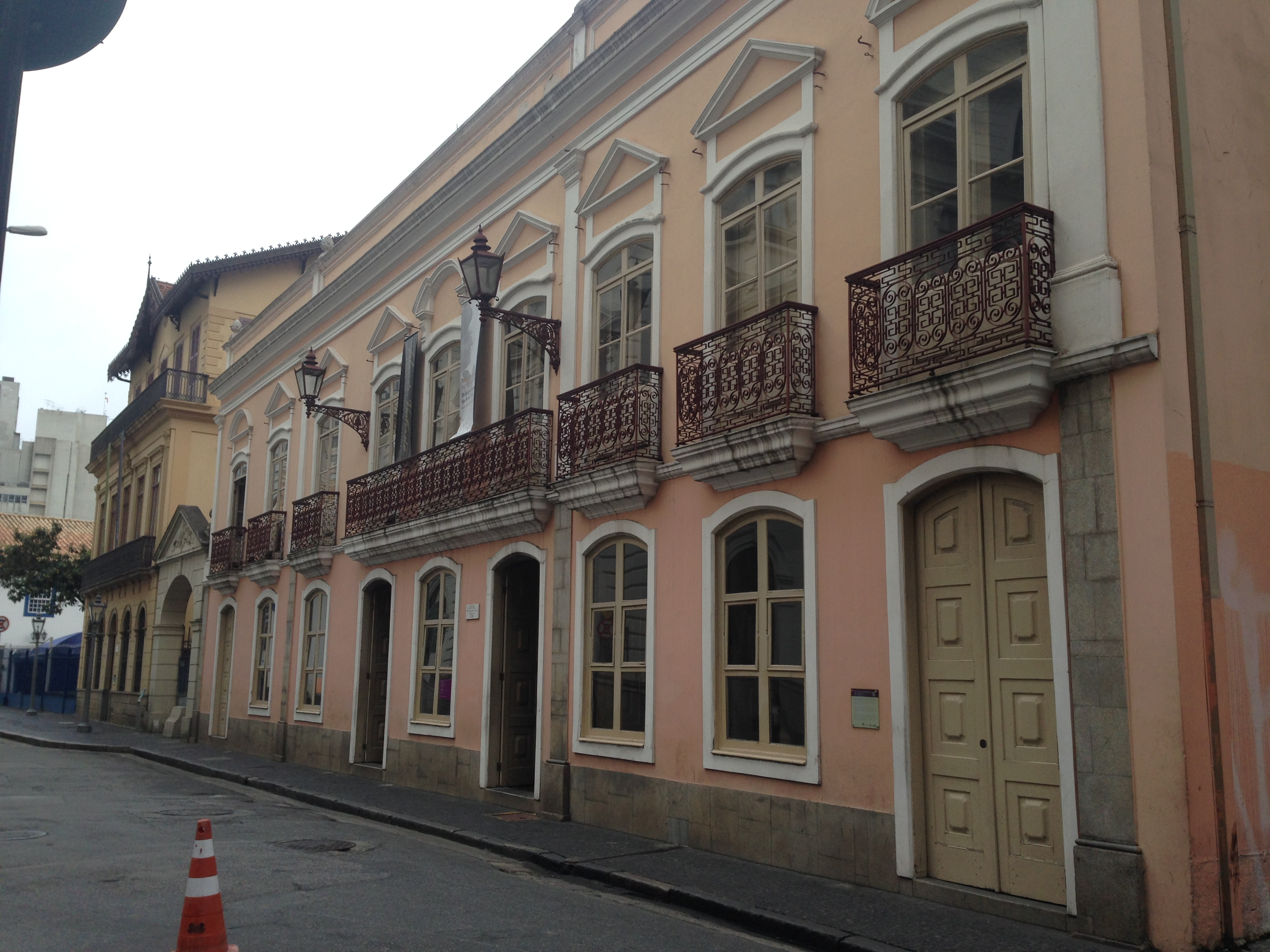
Restored façade

The restorations made in the manor were responsible for maintaining and bringing back characteristics that had been modified in the 19th century, such as the paneled ceilings, the floors, and the paintings.

When visiting the manor, it is possible to find parts of the original walls, which were left exposed to inform what techniques were used to build the residence. Other constructive characteristics that have been kept until today are the maçonnerie de pisé dating from the 18th century. It was also decided to preserve the building's façade with the neoclassical style added in 1965.

Currently, the Solar da Marquesa de Santos is used as the headquarters of the Museum of the City of São Paulo and hosts several exhibitions.

== See also ==
- Pátio do Colégio
- Sertanista House
- Casa do Sítio da Ressaca
- Colonial architecture of Brazil
- Domitila de Castro, Marchioness of Santos
