= Sertanista House =

17th-century Brazilian residence

- Casa do Sertanista (Brazilian Portuguese)
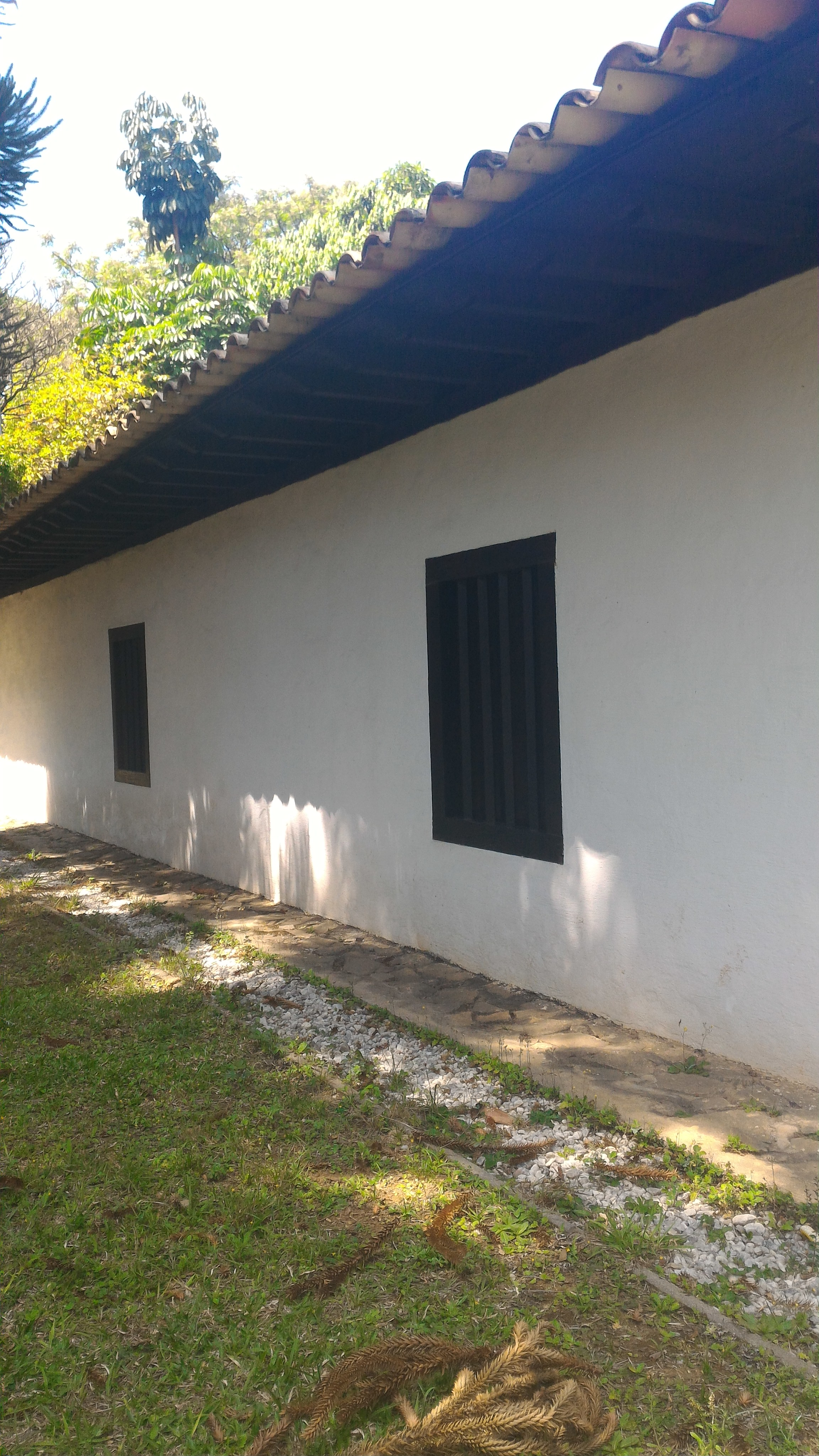
- Interactive map of Sertanista House
- 23°35′02″S 46°43′16″W
- Location: São Paulo, São Paulo, Brazil

History
- Built: 17th century

The Sertanista House or Caxingui House is a residence built in the middle of the 17th century in the neighborhood of Caxingui, in São Paulo.

The construction, a piece from the Brazilian colonial period, shows several typical characteristics of the bandeirista house, with walls in rammed earth (a construction technique known to characterize all the buildings in the city of São Paulo from the 16th, 17th, and 18th centuries), a four-fluted roof, and an earthen floor. The re-entrant porch, also a typical characteristic of the bandeirista houses, is limited on one side by a wall, and on the other side, by a small compartment.

In 1958, the house was donated to the city of São Paulo by Cia. City de Melhoramentos, its owner at the time. Between 1966 and 1970, the building underwent restoration work, and from then on it housed the Sertanista Museum, with a collection dedicated to indigenous culture, which remained there until 1987. Between 1989 and 1993, it was the headquarters of the Indigenous Culture Center of the Union of Indigenous Nations and, in 2000, housed the Rossini Tavares de Lima Folklore Museum. The Sertanista House currently belongs to the architectural collection of the Museum of the City of São Paulo, along with 12 other historic houses spread throughout all regions of the city of São Paulo. They are characterized by being Heritage Education spaces, and may or may not contain contemporary art exhibits, photographs or furniture from the museum's own collection in their interiors, as well as being topics for discussions about the heritage and history of the city of São Paulo.

== History ==
The exact date of construction of the Sertanista House is unknown. However, the year 1843 was found marked on the roof tiles and its architectural structures date back to the bandeirista houses built in the 17th century. According to the study conducted by architect Luís Saia, the building would correspond to a rural residence of the richest farmers of the region at the time. However, for him, the construction proves to be well before this time.

The first owners of the house are also unknown, but the rumor is that it belonged to Father Belchior de Pontes. According to the documentation, the remains of the construction were owned in 1917 by Alberto Christie, who sold 22 bushels of land to Alberto Penteado. Later, in 1937, his son, Carlos Alberto de A. Prado, sold the site to Cia. City de Melhoramentos, which separated a small area and donated it to the City Hall in 1958, responsible for promoting its first reform. In 1970, once the restoration work was concluded, the Sertanista Museum was installed, focusing essentially on indigenous culture. The Sertanista House hosted many other museums during the following years and, in 1983, it was recognized as a historical heritage of the city of São Paulo, given its architectural, cultural, and historical importance, and considered of public interest, integrating the Museum of the City of São Paulo.

== Architecture ==
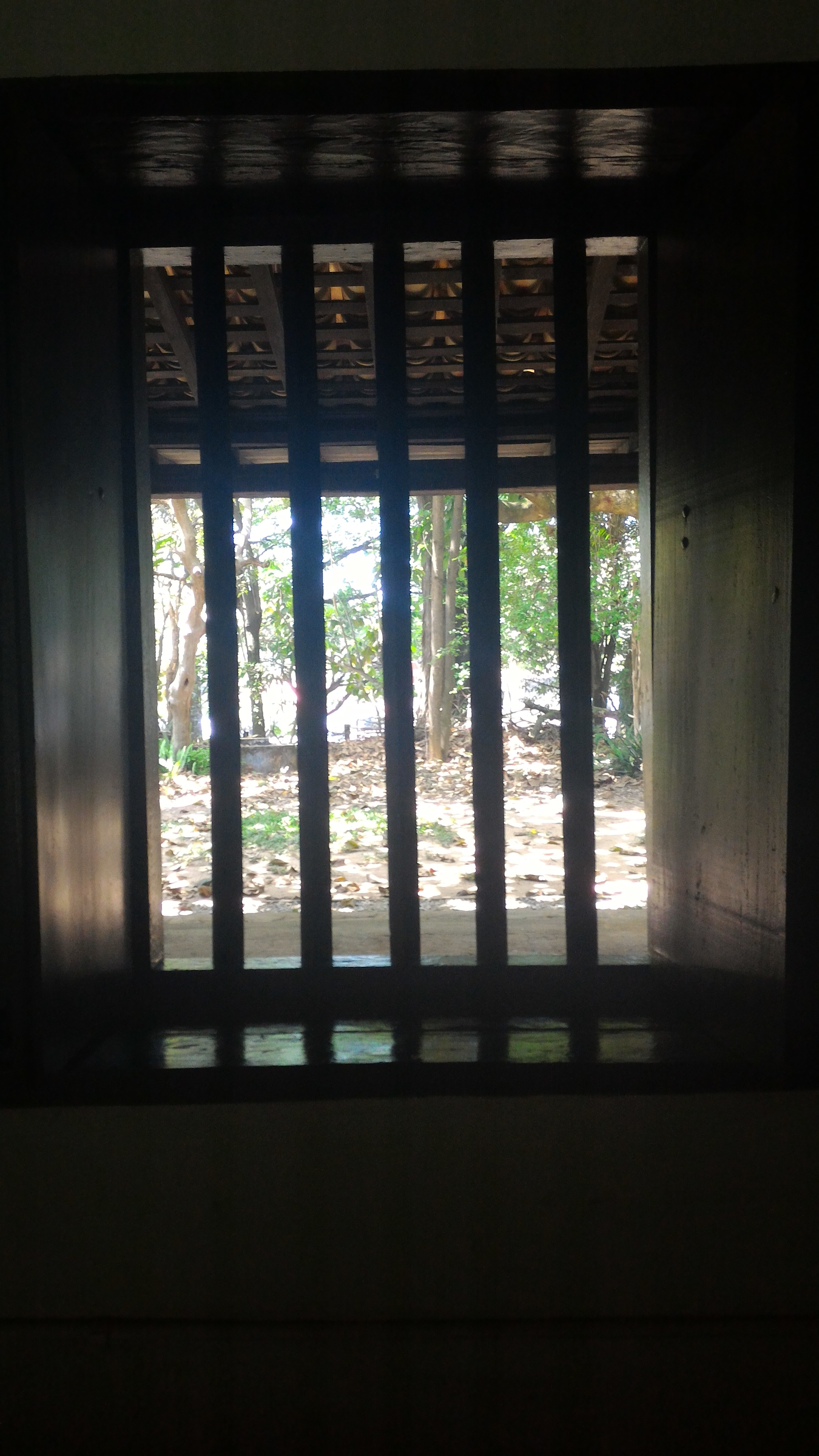
Detail of the windows of the house.

The architecture of the Sertanista House dates back to the old houses of the city's wealthiest farmers. The construction of the original residence was made of rammed earth and wattle and daub. The rammed earth method of the time consisted of adding a mixture of clay, cattle dung, and pebbles to a wooden form to assemble what would become the walls. However, the rammed earth of São Paulo presents a unique characteristic, in which the wall is built from the earth itself, as was the case with the Sertanista House. To avoid the natural humidity of the ground, the paintings on the walls were made of tabatinga.

The house floor plan is regular, similar to the other houses of the bandeirantes of the time, being a one-story model that shows a closed and rigid layout, with few windows. Its roof is classified as four-sloped, which, in those days, had the tiles molded on the slaves' thighs. The rooms also demonstrate the customs of the time. Upon entering the house, there is a main space that connects the hallway to all the other rooms. There is also a back porch that resembles other buildings of the period. This layout was defined in a strict and rigid manner that said much about its occupants; with a border strip, which had on its sides the chapel and the guest room, the bandeirantes marked a boundary between their private and public lives. The strictness of the construction also helped to avoid Indigenous attacks.

The location of the property is also related to the habits of the bandeirantes at the time. It was common to give preference to high points and, when the topography was not favorable for the construction of houses, artificial platforms were created. In addition, the Sertanista House has a privileged position on the map, as it is located about 150 meters from the right bank of the Pirajuçara Stream. This was a privilege because, at the time, the bandeirantes could only move around along the waterways. Therefore, the house presents not only its residential character, but also its military character by being strategically located.

In the renovation, which took place starting in 1966, the house received structural reinforcement in masonry and bricks.

== Historical and cultural significance ==
The Sertanista House dates back to the era of the coffee elites and all its colonial heritage, as do other heritage sites located in the region, which are Sítio da Ressaca, Sítio Santa Luzia, Sítio Itaim, Bandeirante House, and Sítio do Capão. In this way, the Sertanista House serves as another object of architectural study for scholars to have access to buildings from the time of the bandeirantes in São Paulo. Restoring the memory of these properties was a way to rekindle the cultural legacy of the city, seeking to recover the daily life and neighborhoods of the city so that the population can get an overview of the period and learn about the city's origins.

== Heritage Protection ==
The building was classified as a heritage site on December 28, 1983, by the Council for the Defense of Historical, Archaeological, Artistic and Tourist Heritage of the State of São Paulo - CONDEPHAAT, and later, on April 5, 1991, by the Municipal Council for the Preservation of the Historical, Cultural and Environmental Heritage of the City of São Paulo - CONPRESP.

== Current Condition ==
The Sertanista House underwent a restoration in 1966, adopting the same criteria as previous experiences, such as the one at the Bandeirante House. The restoration lasted until 1970, when the house became the Sertanista Museum, from which it got its name, and hosted exhibitions about the indigenous culture. Until 1987, several exhibitions and shows were held with the indigenous collection that stayed there. However, in that year, the house was closed due to the need for conservation works, interrupting the museum activities that had been carried out until then.

In 1989, the Sertanista House became home to the Nucleus of Indigenous Culture (NCI). In 1993, it underwent new restorations and between 2000 and 2007 it housed the collection of the Rossini Tavares de Lima Folklore Museum. The building remained closed for quite some time for further restoration, decupinization and storm water drainage, and then reopened in 2013 for an exhibition by artist Sandra Cinto. It is now part of the group of buildings that belong to the Museum of the City of São Paulo.

In 2016, people who were interested had access to enter historic properties for the Heritage Journey, a place in which they could explore the materials left behind. At this event, they were able to observe toy scraps from the 20th century located in the house.

== Gallery ==
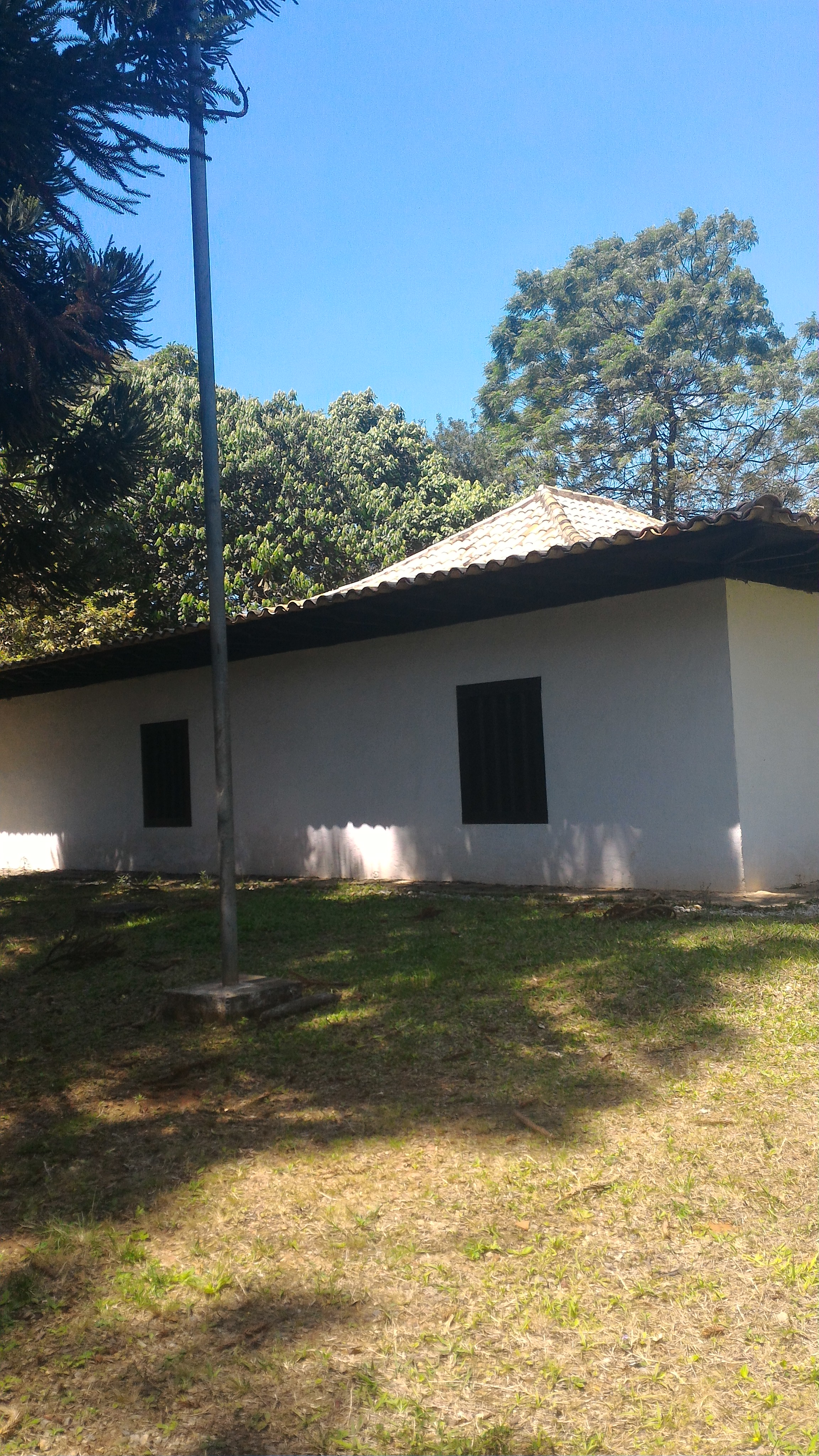
Side of the Sertanista House.

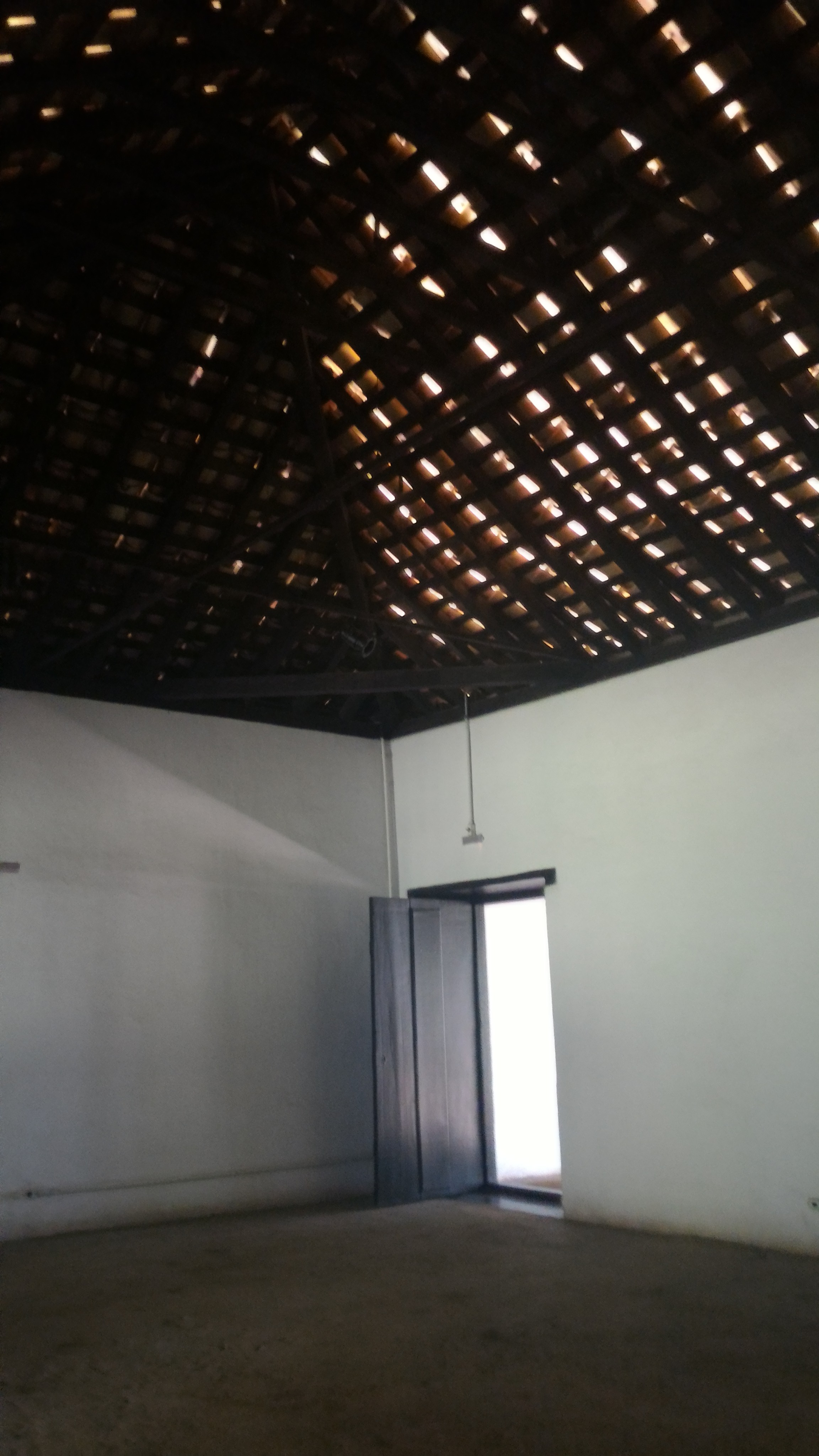
View of the main and largest room in the house.

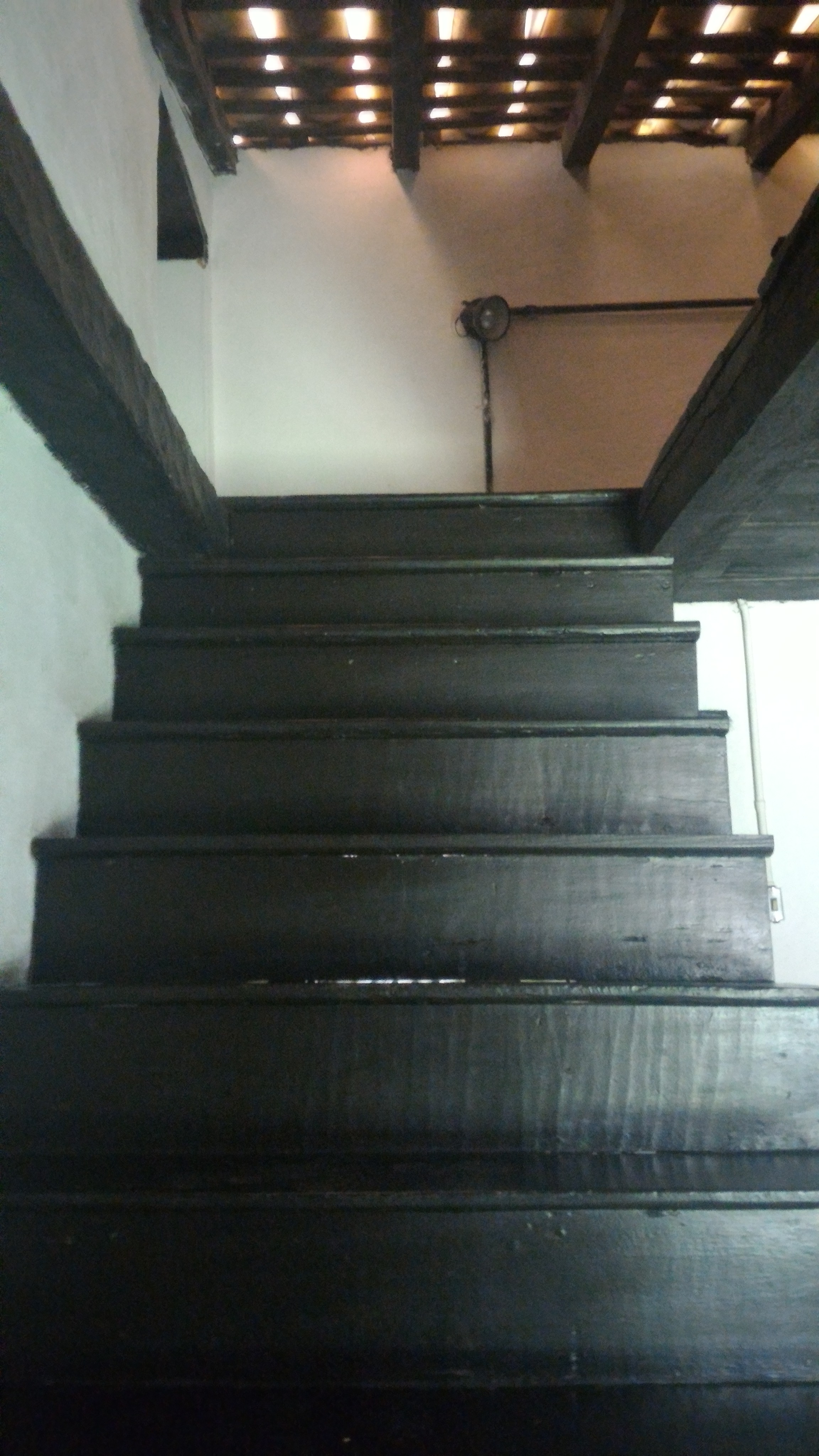
Stairs leading up to the attic.

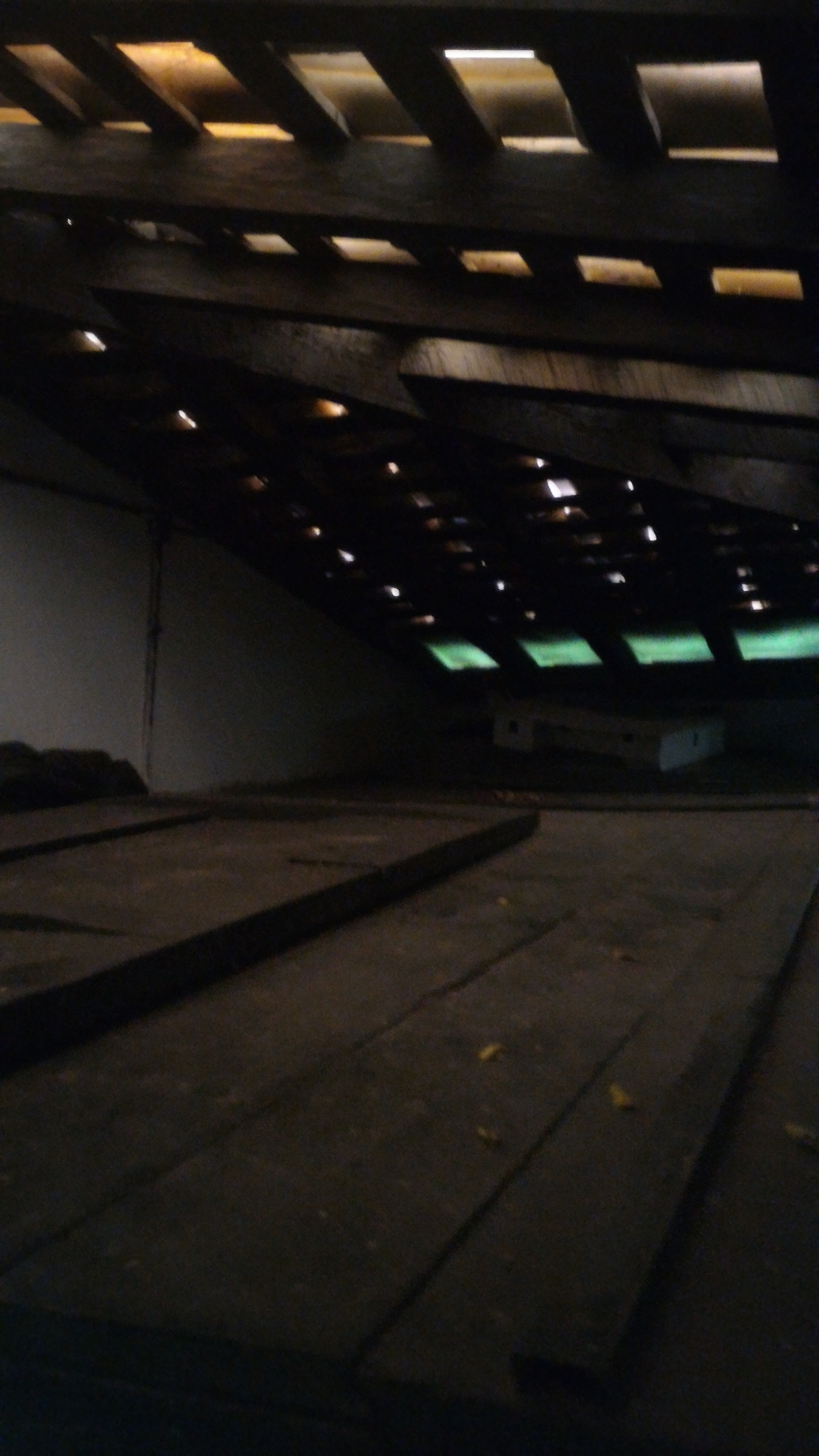
Attic of the house.

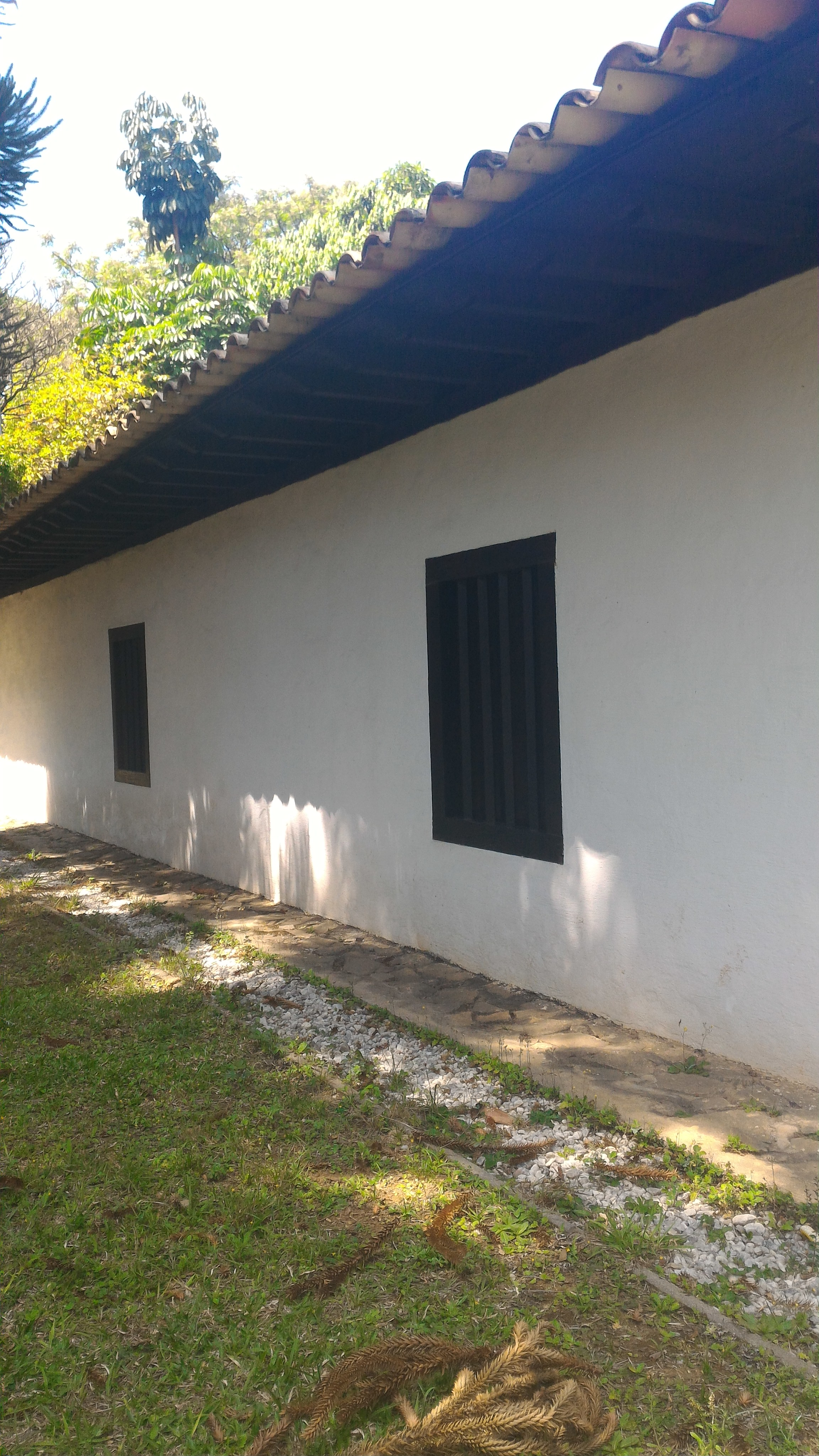
Side view of the house.

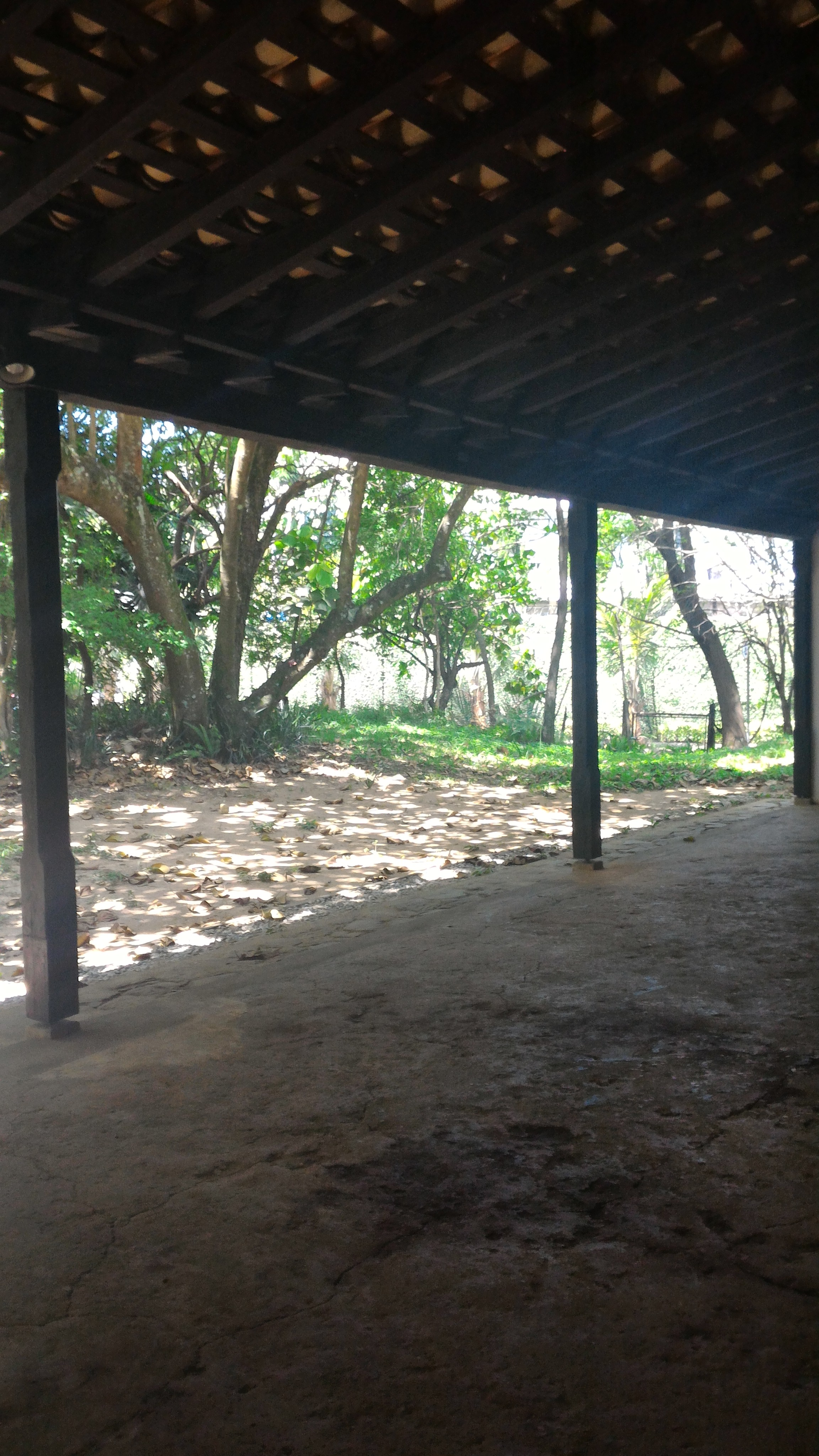
Back view of the house.

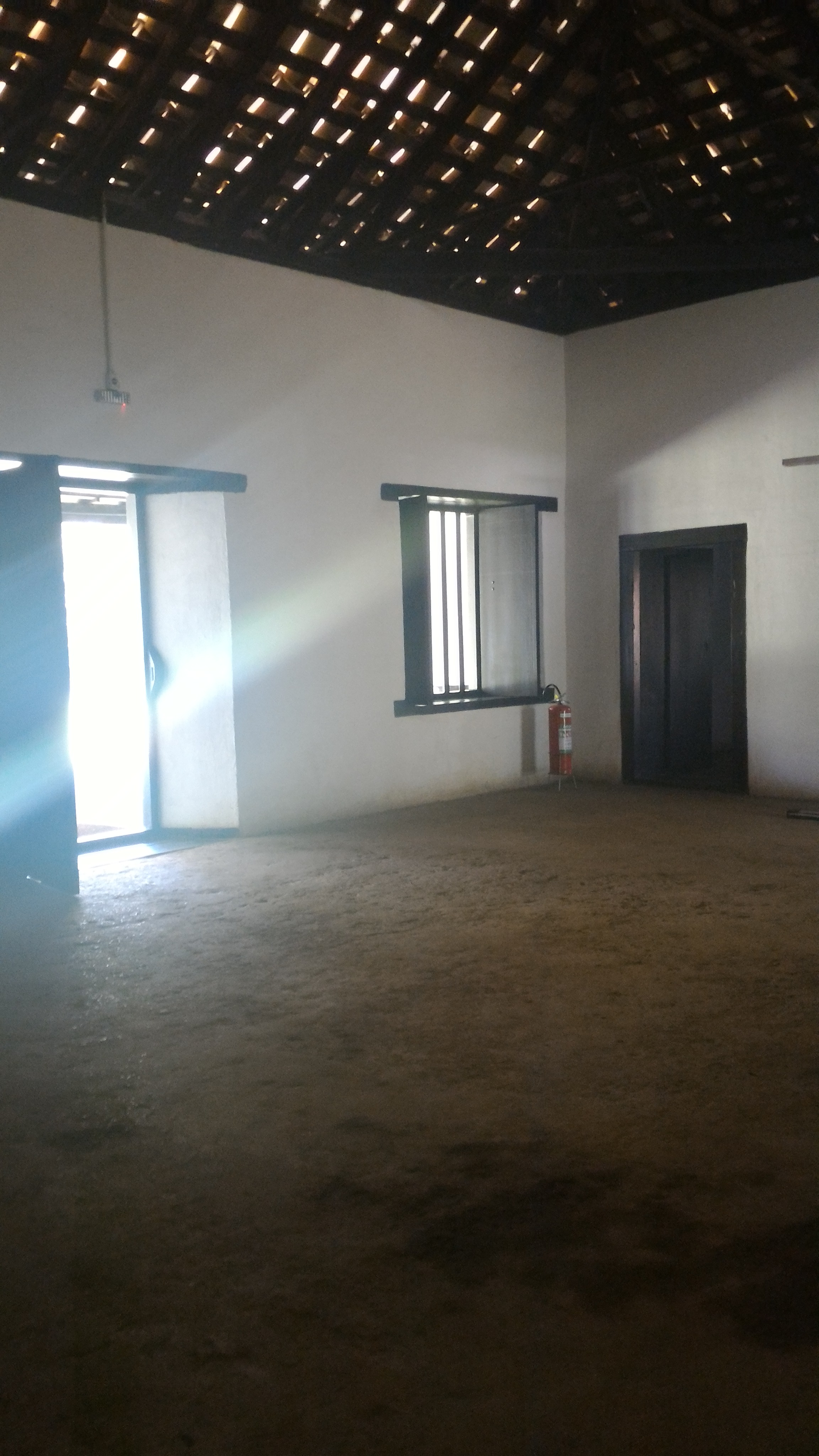
View from another angle of the main and largest room in the house.

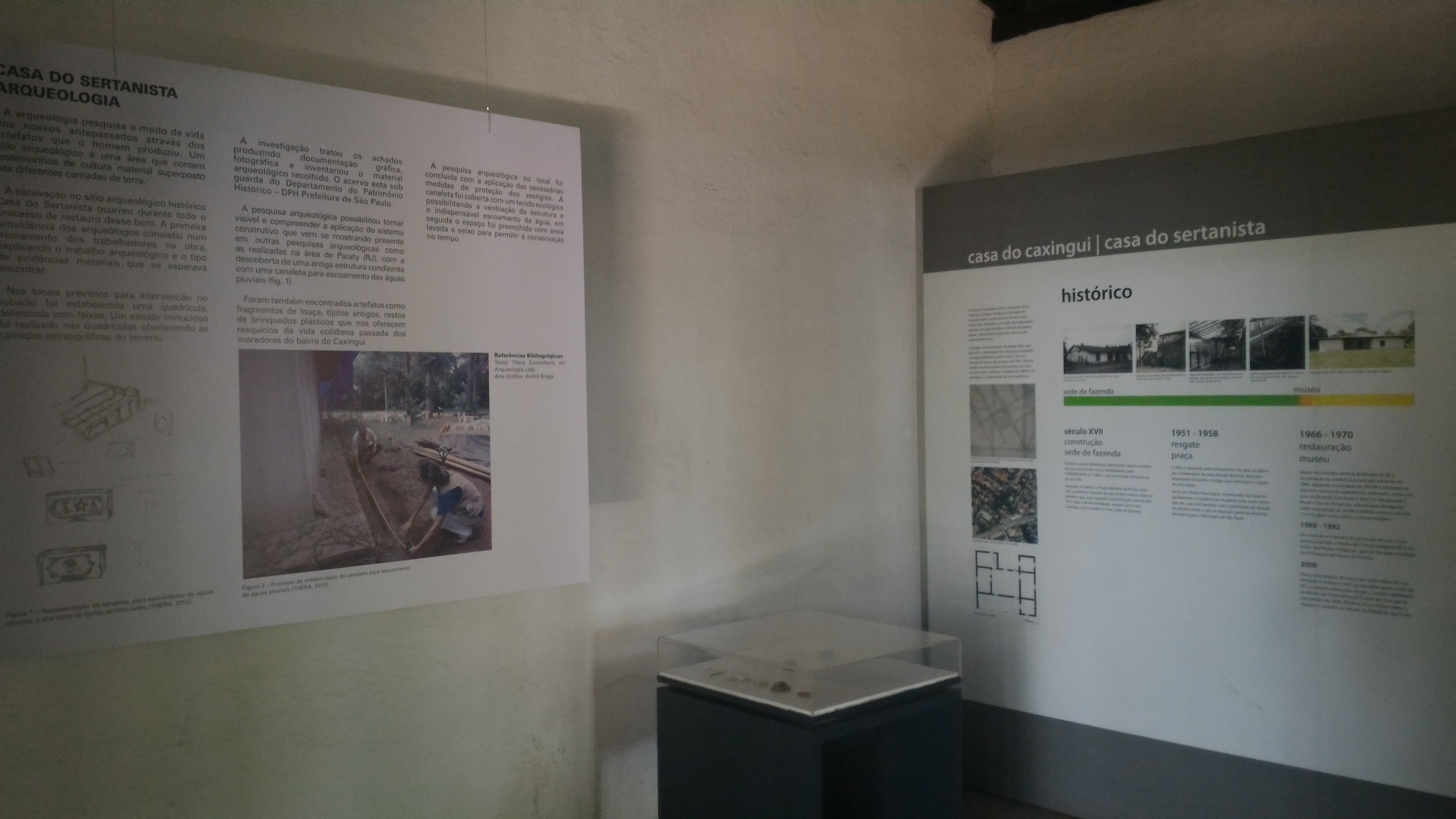
Small museum located in one of the rooms of the house.

== See also ==
- Bandeirantes
- Casa do Sítio da Ressaca
- Solar da Marquesa de Santos
- Sítio Morrinhos
- Council for the Defense of Historical, Archaeological, Artistic and Tourist Heritage
