= Statue of Borba Gato =

Monument in São Paulo, Brazil

Coordinates: 23°37′58″S 46°41′32″W

Borba Gato
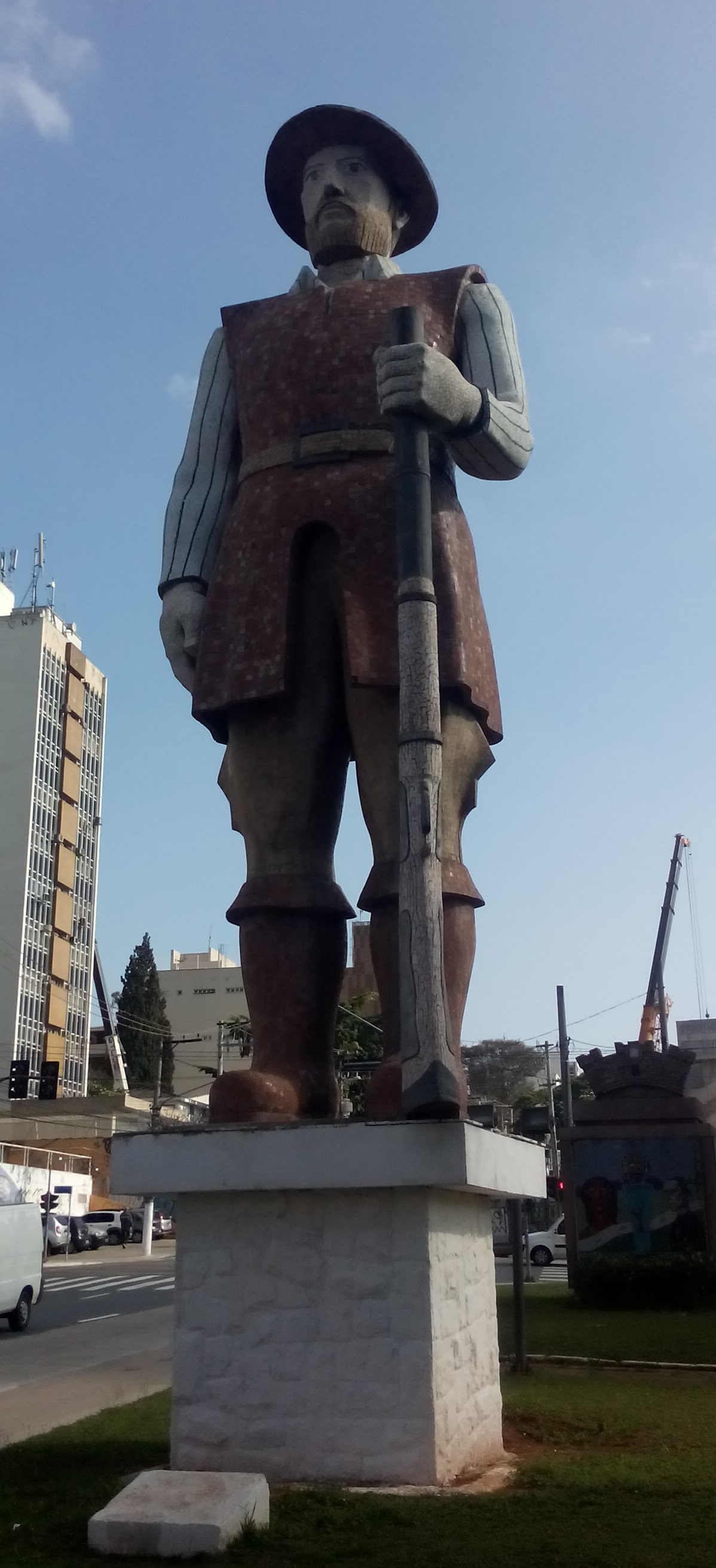
- Artist: Júlio Guerra
- Year: 27 January 1957; 68 years ago
- Location: Santo Amaro; São Paulo, SP

The Borba Gato is a monument in the municipality of São Paulo, in Brazil, considered one of its most famous postcards, located in the Augusto Tortorelo de Araújo Square, in the Santo Amaro district.

== History ==
=== Origins ===
The monument is a tribute to Manuel de Borba Gato, who was born in 1649 in São Paulo, in what is now the Santo Amaro district, and died in Sabará, Minas Gerais, in 1734. Borba Gato, who during his youth accompanied his father-in-law Fernão Dias Paes in search of emeralds, would become a famous bandeirante in the colonization of Minas Gerais and an allied leader of the Paulistas during the War of the Emboabas, a conflict that broke out in the first half of the 18th century in the territory of the Captaincy of São Vicente, between Paulista bandeirantes against Portuguese, Spaniards and other people from other parts of Portuguese America; the defeat of Borba Gato's bandeirante army had consequences such as the division of the Captaincy of São Vicente and the displacement of Paulistas to areas that today correspond to the states of Goiás, Mato Grosso and Mato Grosso do Sul, in the Center-West of Brazil. Manuel de Borba Gato is also known for having been the first to discover gold in the Das Velhas River, place of the legendary Sabarabuçu mines, which earned him the appointment of guarda-mor (inspector of customs).

=== Construction ===
The monument's author, Júlio Guerra, a proud Caipira, started the project in 1957 in his backyard, located on Avenida João Dias, in Santo Amaro. When he had finished sculpting the plaster, Guerra cut it into various parts and shaped it; inside he began to structure his giant with mortar and lay colored basalt and marble stones, covering it; the stones came from various places – those covering the gibão – a leather vest, common among Bandeirantes – came from the Minas Gerais municipalities of Congonhas and Ouro Preto, while those on the face were fragments of pink marble, brought from Portugal; white marble was also used, brought from Paraná state. Some local children had the opportunity to contribute to the construction of the work by laying stones for the statue; a boy wearing boots served as a model for Guerra to perfect Borba Gato's boots.

The sculptor, who did not opt for bronze, a material often used in the construction of statues and monuments, had to come up with a creative solution to structure his work – as Borba Gato is large and streetcar tracks were recurrent in the region, as the modal was beginning to be left aside, Guerra decided that this material would be ideal to support his work. Thus, what supports him are streetcar tracks inside, two of which are vertical, following the legs and one horizontal at shoulder height.

When finished, it was 10 meters high (13 meters including its pedestal) and weighed 20 tons. It was hollow inside and had four air vents to prevent the material from swelling. The work, which began in 1957, was planned to be inaugurated in 1960, the date on which Santo Amaro would have celebrated its 400th anniversary as a town, but due to the death of one of Guerra's sons by drowning in 1958, the monument was only inaugurated in 1963. Borba Gato came to be seen as the guardian of Santo Amaro, becoming one of São Paulo's most famous postcards and part of the Inventário de Obras de Arte em Logradouros Públicos da Cidade de São Paulo, maintained by the Department of Historic Heritage (DPH).

Behind the Borba Gato monument is a cube-shaped structure covered with four mosaic panels with images of Joseph of Anchieta and Caiubi (Tibiriçá's indigenous brother), with the coat of arms of the former municipality of Santo Amaro and the Jurubatuba river in the center. Among other historical figures portrayed by Júlio Guerra in the structure are the couple João Paes and Suzana Rodrigues (who appear donating the image of Saint Amaro), a metallurgist, the poet Paulo Eiró and the Jesuit priest Belchior de Pontes. There are also references to the first German settlers and a local iron factory, the first in South America.

== Vandalism ==
After the 2010s, the statue became the target of repeated protests and acts of vandalism, due to rumors that have never been proven that Manuel de Borba Gato allegedly carried out acts of sexual violation, predation, murder and genocide against indigenous people, although historically, his only known crime is the murder of an emissary of the crown, Rodrigo de Castelo Branco, in 1682, which led the bandeirante to choose to live in isolation for around fifteen to eighteen years among the Botocudo Indians, even to the point of being respected as a leader.

=== Attack in 2021 ===
The most notorious act of vandalism took place in July 2021; under the influence of a wave of protests in the United States following the murder of George Floyd, which involved the toppling of a series of monuments to historical figures, when Paulo Galo, leader of the Entregadores Antifascistas, and Danilo Silva Oliveira, self-declared members of the Peripheral Revolution movement, wrapped the pedestal of the Borba Gato statue with tires and set them on fire with gasoline.

In December 2022, Galo was sentenced to 3 years in prison on an open regime, replaced by community service, while other defendants in the attack were acquitted. Former president of Brazil Luiz Inácio Lula da Silva used his social networks to express his indignation at Paulo Galo's imprisonment; Political of São Paulo figures such as Erica Malunguinho, a native of Recife but active in São Paulo, compared Borba Gato to Adolf Hitler; Luana Alves Silva and Guilherme Boulos proposed removing Borba Gato and replacing him with historical figures from other Brazilian states, such as quilombola leaders Tereza de Benguela, related to the history of Mato Grosso, and Zumbi, from Pernambuco. The mayor of São Paulo, Ricardo Nunes, lamented the attack and said that the restoration of the statue would be funded by a businessman. Eduardo Bueno, a writer, journalist and former member of the Workers' Party, known for producing history content, opposed the attack, arguing that the wrong statue was burned and that Borba Gato never persecuted indigenous people.
