= Jabaquara (district of São Paulo) =

District of São Paulo, Brazil

Coordinates: 23.6364°S 46.6459°W

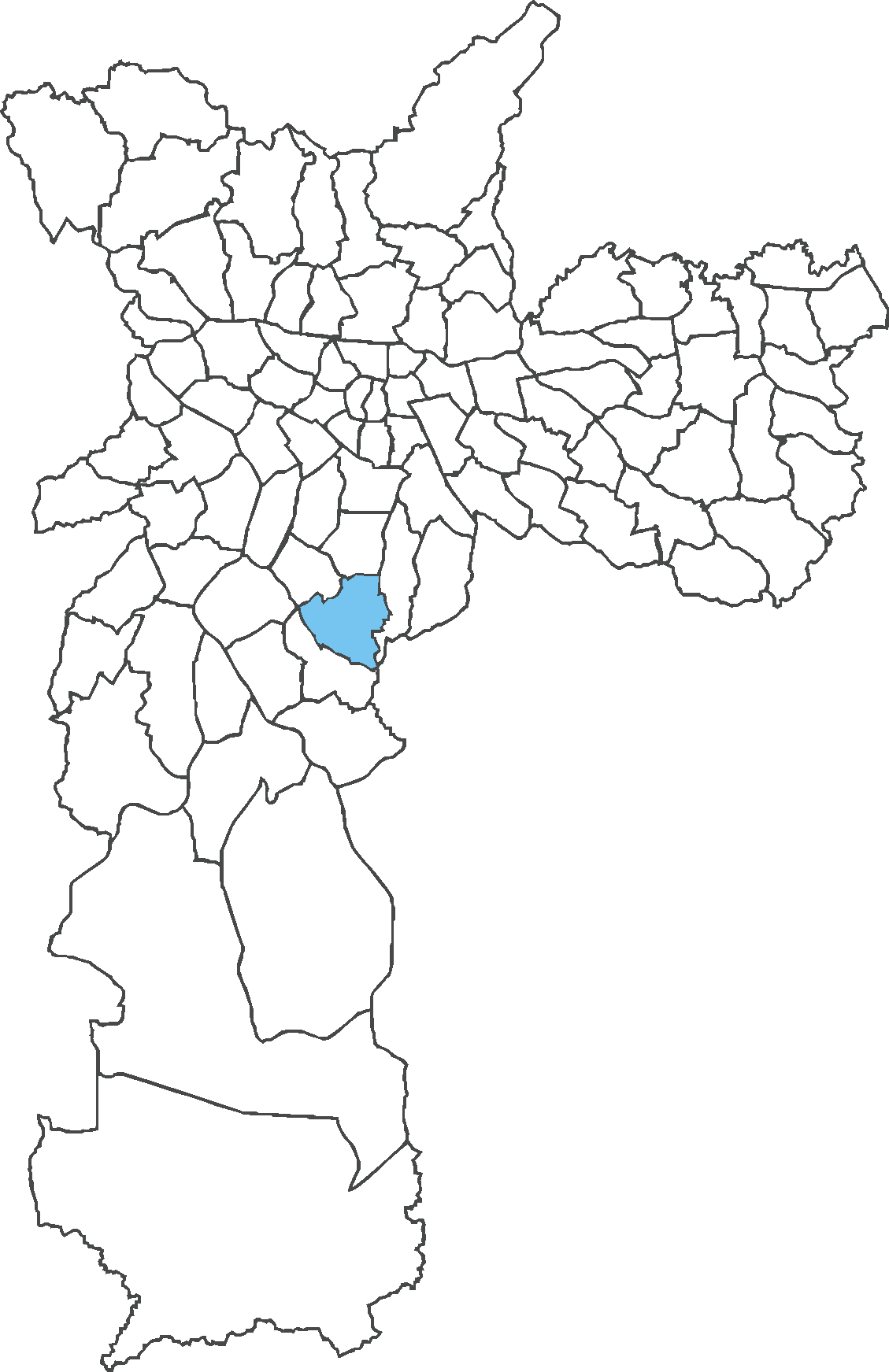
- District of the city of São Paulo
- Country: Brazil
- State: São Paulo
- Municipality: São Paulo
- Subprefecture: Jabaquara

Area
  - Total: 14.10 km^{2} (5.44 sq mi)

Population (2007)
  - Total: 223,780
  - Density: 15,871/km^{2} (41,110/sq mi)
- Website: Subprefecture of Jabaquara

Jabaquara is one of 96 districts in the city of São Paulo, Brazil. The name Jabaquara comes from tupi, îababa (escape) and kûara (den). Most probably due to several quilombos that existed in the area.

Avenida Engenheiro Armando de Arruda Pereira is the main road that runs through the district. This road is part of the São Mateus–Jabaquara Metropolitan Corridor, which connects with the ABC Paulista region. The district is also home to a section of the Rodovia dos Imigrantes located in the capital of São Paulo.

== See also ==
- Casa do Sítio da Ressaca
