= Municipal Council for the Preservation of the Historical, Cultural and Environmental Heritage of the City of São Paulo =

Public organization in São Paulo, Brazil

- Conselho Municipal de Preservação do Patrimônio Histórico, Cultural e Ambiental da Cidade de São Paulo
- Coat of arms of the municipality of São Paulo
- Abbreviation: CONPRESP
- Founded: December 27, 1985; 40 years ago
- Headquarters: São Paulo, São Paulo; Brazil
- Members: 9
- President: João Cury (2020-2023)
- Website: www.prefeitura.sp.gov.br/cidade/secretarias/cultura/conpresp/

The Municipal Council for the Preservation of the Historical, Cultural and Environmental Heritage of the City of São Paulo (Portuguese: Conselho Municipal de Preservação do Patrimônio Histórico, Cultural e Ambiental da Cidade de São Paulo), also known as CONPRESP, is a commission linked to the Municipal Department of Culture and supported by the technical staff of the Department of Historical Heritage (DPH).

CONPRESP is the agency responsible for the registration of cultural, natural and historical properties in the city of São Paulo in order to preserve them according to artistic, architectural and urbanistic values. CONPRESP and DPH are interdependent and responsible for deliberating on the cultural and environmental preservation of the municipality.

It was created under Law No. 10.032, on September 27, 1985, as a collegiate cultural advisory agency linked to the Municipal Department of Culture. Its attributions, amended by Laws No. 10.236 on December 16, 1986, and No. 14.516 of October 11, 2007, stipulate that CONPRESP can grant approval for the listing of movable and immovable property, communicate the registration to similar bodies and claim benefits for the owners of these properties.

== Members ==
The board is composed of one full member and one alternate member from the following representations:

- CMSP - Municipal Chamber of São Paulo;
- CREA - Regional Council of Engineering and Agronomy of São Paulo;
- DPH - Department of Historical Heritage (Department Director);
- IAB - Institute of Architects of Brazil - São Paulo Branch;
- OAB - Order of Attorneys of Brazil - São Paulo Branch;
- SMDU - Municipal Department of Urban Development;
- SEL - Municipal Licensing Department;
- SMC - Municipal Department of Culture;
- SMJ - Municipal Department of Justice.

== Organization ==
As established in the regiment, the council is composed of:

- Presidency;
- Chair's advisory body;
- Plenary;
- Executive secretary;
- Advisory body.

The bodies must nominate a representative and an alternate who will be chosen by the mayor. The president and vice-president will be chosen by a vote of its members at a meeting held specifically for this purpose. The candidate with the majority of votes wins.

=== Operation ===
The council must meet periodically twice a month, with the possibility of extra sessions whenever the situation demands it, as long as they are summoned by the president or a majority of its members. Among other duties, the executive secretary is responsible for writing up the records of each meeting in order to be signed by the president and the councillors present and then published in the city's official gazette.

All of the council's resolutions and deliberations are decided by a majority vote of the members present. The decisions regarding the designation of a landmark are based on studies conducted by the technical staff or by a private initiative. The document is formalized in the Livro do Tombamento, which contains the resolutions and definitions of the classification process and the area covered.

== CONPRESP's functions ==
- Decide on the total or partial protection of movable and immovable property, whether publicly or privately owned;
- Inform the state and federal registry offices about the registration of property;
- Formulate the guidelines and strategies necessary to guarantee the preservation of cultural and natural assets;
- Delimitation of the area surrounding a listed property in order for it to be properly controlled;
- To promote the preservation and enhancement of the landscape, environments and ecological spaces that are important for maintaining environmental quality and guaranteeing physical and ecological memory;
- Promote a strategy for monitoring the preservation and use of protected properties;
- Adopt the measures provided for in Law No. 10.032, which are necessary for the effects of patrimony to be achieved;
- In case of exceptional necessity, decide on proposals to revise the heritage process;
- Maintain permanent contact with public and private, national and international organizations, in order to obtain resources, technical and cultural cooperation for planning the stages of preservation and revitalization of the municipality's cultural and natural assets;
- When necessary and at a higher level of complexity, to express an opinion on projects, plans and proposals for construction, conservation, repair, restoration and demolition, as well as on applications for licenses to operate commercial activities or provide services in buildings located in areas defined as cultural and natural heritage preservation zones.

== Seal of Cultural Value of the City of São Paulo ==
In August 2016, seven sites in the city were awarded the seal of Cultural Value of the City of São Paulo, formalized in December 2015 by CONPRESP, with the purpose to honor venues that represent the place's social and cultural identity. Unlike a protected landmark, the seal does not require the owner to submit any project to intervene in the space to the council. However, the initiative does not guarantee preservation, only social mobilization for the preservation of the recognized asset.

Among the seven places that were awarded the seal of Cultural Value in the first half of 2016 are: the Carlino Restaurant, founded in 1881, and the Italianinha, Quatorze de Julho and Santa Tereza Bakeries, in operation since 1896, 1897 and 1872, respectively. Also awarded the seal are the Parque das Acácias (APRACS) and Parque das Hortênsias buildings, both from the 1950s, and the Casa da Bóia Metais e Hidráulica, the oldest rust store on Florêncio de Abreu Street, founded in 1898, which features a museum about trade and São Paulo's industrial era.

The seal of Cultural Value is effective for up to five years and can be renewed by CONPRESP and DPH, according to the preservation of the site. The first seven properties to receive the award were selected after a survey of the oldest establishments, based on the records of the São Paulo Trade Association and requests from the municipality's citizens. The council intends to select other places that are considered by the population to be part of their historical heritage.

== Legislation ==
=== Laws ===
Law	Date	Content
No. 8.204	January 13, 1975	Creation of the Municipal Department of Culture.
No. 8.252	May 20, 1975	Creation of the Department of Artistic Information and Documentation.
No. 14.223	September 26, 2006	Composition of the urban landscape of the city of São Paulo.
Organic Law of the City of São Paulo	1990	Includes articles on cultural and environmental preservation.
No. 10.032	December 27, 1985	Creation of a Municipal Council for the Preservation of the Historical, Cultural and Environmental Heritage of São Paulo.
No. 10.236	December 16, 1986	Amends provisions of Law No. 10.032, of December 27, 1985.
No. 14.405	May 21, 2007	Refers to the preservation of public property in municipal school activities.
No. 14.406	May 21, 2007	Establishment of the Permanent Program for the Protection and Conservation of the Intangible Heritage of São Paulo.
No. 14.424	June 1, 2007	Edition of the Municipal Atlas of the Historical, Archaeological, Architectural, Landscape and Cultural Heritage of the City of São Paulo and other measures.
No. 14.516	October 11, 2007	Changes and adds provisions to Law No. 10.032, of December 27, 1985, as amended by Law No. 10.236, of December 16, 1986, and provides other measures.
No. 14.517	October 16, 2007	Establishment of the Municipal Public-Private Partnerships Program; creates the Companhia São Paulo de Parcerias (SPP) and provides other measures.
No. 14.690	February 12, 2008	Partial use of the tax form collected from the IPTU of the city of São Paulo to broadcast messages of utility and interest to the public.
No. 12.350	June 6, 1997	Grants tax incentives to property owners or sponsors of external restoration and conservation work on properties located in the Special Intervention Area.
No. 13.712	January 7, 2004	Grants tax incentives for cinemas located in buildings accessed by a public thoroughfare or in semi-public spaces with gallery circulation, in exchange for social and cultural benefits.
No. 14.256	December 29, 2006	Institution of the Administrative Installment Payment of Tax Debts (PAT) in São Paulo.
No. 13.106	December 29, 2000	Grants exemption and discount from property tax to specific buildings and provides other measures.
No. 14.096	December 8, 2005	Establishment of the Selective Incentives Program for the region around Luz Station, in the central area of the city of São Paulo.
No. 13.496	January 7, 2003	Creation of the Selective Incentives Program for the central area of São Paulo according to the terms specified.
No. 14.718	April 25, 2008	Prohibits tax exemptions or benefits and the authorization of environmental licensing and certification in the specified cases and provides other measures.
No. 14.720	April 25, 2008	It regulates the disclosure of data on officials, employees and civil servants linked to the Municipal Government on the agency's website and provides other measures.
No. 14.719	April 25, 2008	Allegation of public utility of private areas for the implementation of Aclimação Park.
No. 15.201	June 18, 2010	Adds information to the sole paragraph of art. 5 of Law no. 10.032.

=== Decrees ===
Decree	Date	Content
No. 50.989	November 13, 2009	Establishes the constitution of the Municipal Council for the Preservation of the Historical, Cultural and Environmental Heritage of the City of São Paulo (CONPRESP), instituted by Law No. 10.032, of December 27, 1985.
No. 49.356	March 31, 2008	Prescribes the provisions of the sole paragraph of article 6 of Law No. 14.029, of July 13, 2005, and paragraph 2 of article 21 of Law No. 14.141, of March 27, 2006.
No. 48.488	July 3, 2007	Appoints Municipal Secretaries to regulate access and ratify agreements or other terms of cooperation involving the digital map of the city of São Paulo.
No. 48.379	May 25, 2007	Transfer of responsibilities to the Municipal Housing Secretariat (SEHAB).
No. 48.368	May 23, 2007	Determination of the Commission for the Protection of the Urban Landscape (CPPU).
No. 48.223	March 23, 2007	Creation of the Environmental Guard Inspectorate.
No. 48.163	February 28, 2007	Dispensation of article 116 and 127 on the Special Cultural Preservation Zone (ZEPEC).
No. 47.493	July 20, 2006	Determination of the São Paulo Cultural and Environmental Heritage Protection Fund (FUNCAP).
No. 47.824	October 27, 2006	Addresses the responsibilities of the Commission for Integrated Analysis of Building and Land Development Projects (Caieps) and cancels Decree No. 41,864 of April 4, 2002.
No. 47.950	December 5, 2006	Regulation of Law No. 14.223, of September 26, 2006.
No. 37.302	January 27, 1998	Regulation of Law No. 12.350 of June 6, 1997.
No. 44.493	March 15, 2004	Regulation of Law No. 13.496 of January 7, 2003.
No. 45.682	December 30, 2004	Regulation of Law No. 13.712 of January 7, 2004.
No. 46.996	February 13, 2006	Regulation of Law No. 14.096 of December 8, 2005.
No. 47.950	December 5, 2006	Regulation of Law No. 14.223 of September 26, 2006.
No. 49.245	February 25, 2008	Regulation of article 50 of Law 14.223 of September 26, 2006.

== See also ==
- Council for the Defense of Historical, Archaeological, Artistic and Tourist Heritage
- Department of Historic Heritage of São Paulo
