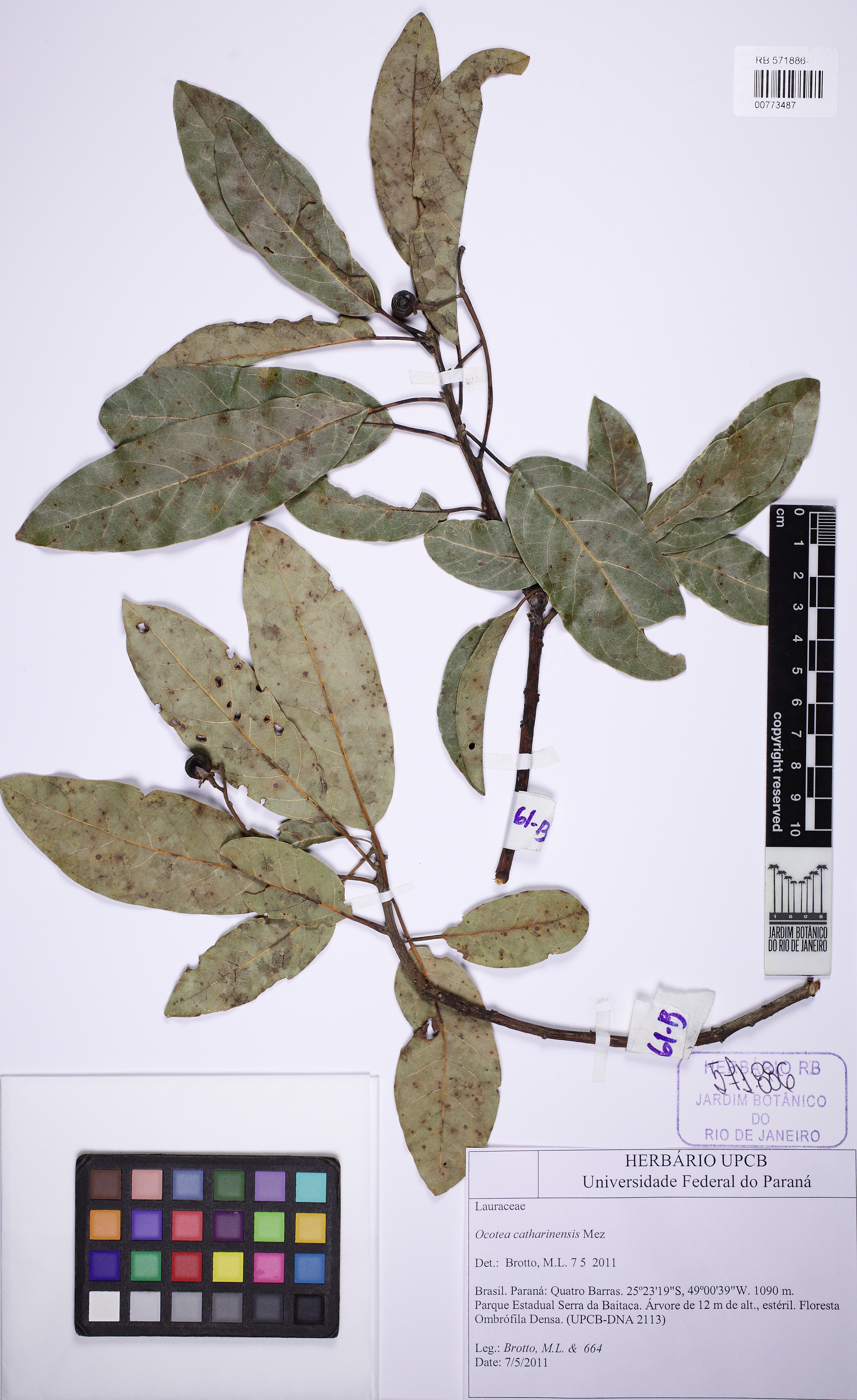

Conservation status
- Vulnerable (IUCN 2.3)

Scientific classification
- Kingdom: Plantae
- Clade: Embryophytes
- Clade: Tracheophytes
- Clade: Spermatophytes
- Clade: Angiosperms
- Clade: Magnoliids
- Order: Laurales
- Family: Lauraceae
- Genus: Ocotea
- Species: O. catharinensis

Binomial name
- Ocotea catharinensis Mez

Synonyms
- Heterotypic Synonyms: Nectandra dubia Hassl.

= Ocotea catharinensis =

Species of tree

Ocotea catharinensis is a species of flowering plant in the family Lauraceae. It is a slow-growing evergreen, a valuable hardwood tree of broad ecological importance, and it is threatened by habitat loss and by overexploitation for its timber and essential oils.

== Distribution ==
The tree is endemic to southeastern Brazil in the Atlantic Forest ecoregion.

It is found in Paraná, Rio de Janeiro Rio Grande do Sul, Santa Catarina, and São Paulo states.

It can be a dominant canopy tree in the tropical rainforests of these states. It grows on deep, rich, well-drained soils on slopes between 30–900 metres (98–2,953 ft) in elevation.

== Description ==
Ocotea catharinensis is a slow-growing monoecious evergreen hardwood up to 40m tall. Its flowers are small and hermaphrodite. The ovary is glabrous with a well developed ovule. Often not all the locelli are fertile.

It is a honey-bearing tree and its fruits are eaten by birds and mammals, including the endangered monkey Brachyteles arachnoides.

== Uses ==
The tree is badly overexploited for its valuable hardwood, its essential oils with their (linalool) content, and for various pharmaceutical compounds or prospects such as neolignans. From the early- to mid-20th century the wood was popular for the flooring of houses in the Brazilian coastal State of Santa Catarina.

== Conservation ==
In 1997 it appeared in the IUCN Red List as a Vulnerable species, which it retains currently. Since then it has been described as "on the verge of extinction" and research is being published on prospects for its somatic propagation.
