= Council for the Defense of Historical, Archaeological, Artistic and Tourist Heritage =

- Conselho de Defesa do Patrimônio Histórico, Arqueológico, Artístico e Turístico
- Founded: 1968
- Website: www.condephaat.sp.gov.br

The Council for the Defense of Historical, Archaeological, Artistic and Tourist Heritage (Portuguese: Conselho de Defesa do Patrimônio Histórico, Arqueológico, Artístico e Turístico), or CONDEPHAAT, protects, values and communicates information about cultural heritage in the State of São Paulo, Brazil. This includes monuments, buildings, natural areas, and historical areas, amongst other things. The council was started in 1968. It is linked with SEC-SP.

== See also ==
- Sertanista House
- Casa do Sítio da Ressaca
- Department of Historic Heritage of São Paulo
