= Sítio Morrinhos =

18th-century heritage site in São Paulo, Brazil

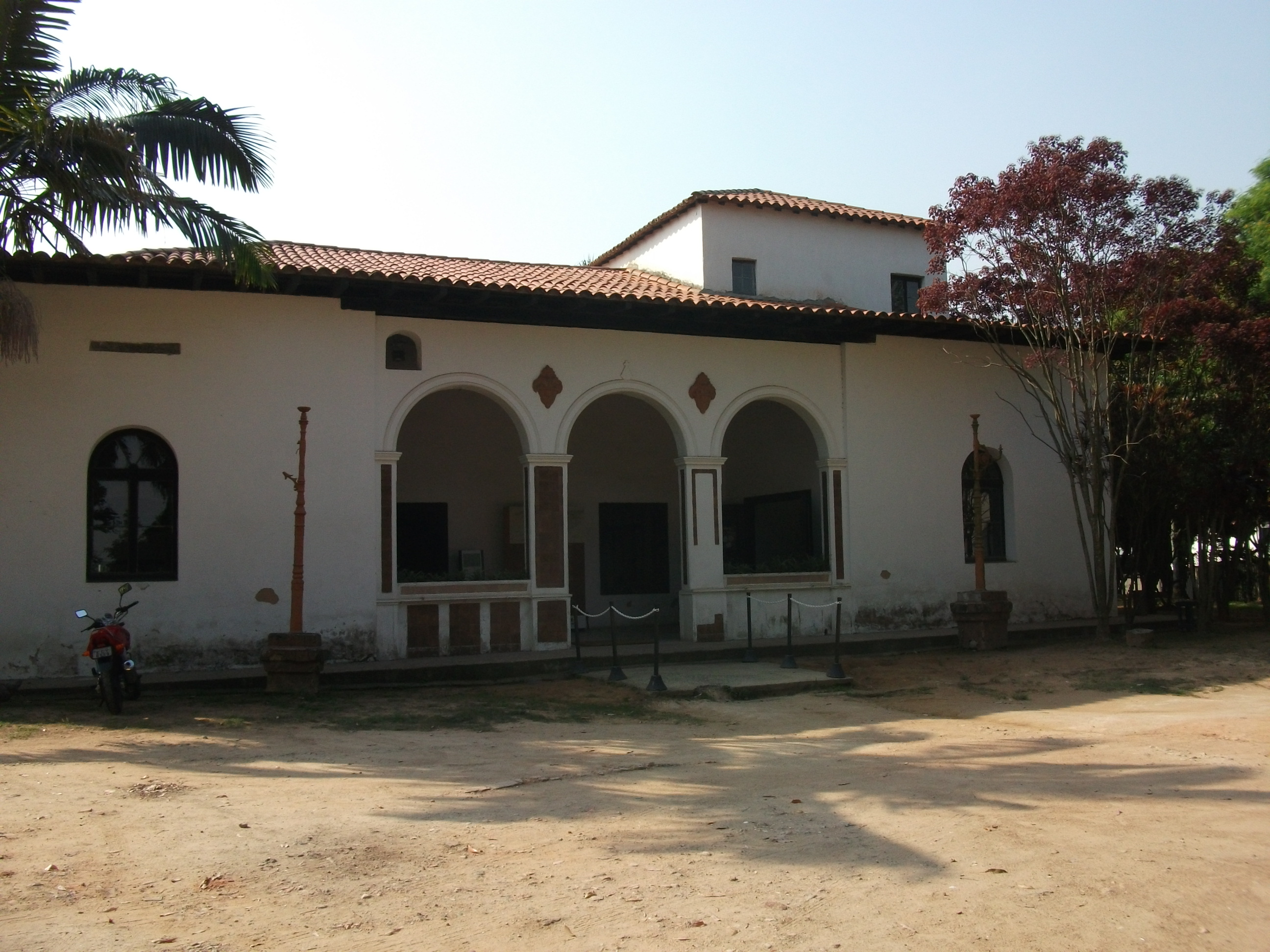
- Entrance to Sítio Morrinhos
- Interactive map of the Sítio Morrinhos area

General information
- Location: São Paulo, Brazil, Rua Santo Anselmo, 102 - CEP 02525-080 - São Paulo, SP
- Coordinates: 23°30′23″S 46°38′58″W
- Completed: 1702
- Owner: City of São Paulo

Design and construction
- Awards and prizes: Heritage site listed by CONDEPHAAT (1975)

Website
- http://www.museudacidade.sp.gov.br/

Sítio Morrinhos ("Morrinhos Farm") or Chácara de São Bento ("São Bento Farm") is an architectural complex, which consists of a main house built during the 18th century and a few annexed buildings from the 19th and 20th centuries. It is part of the collection of Historic Houses, under the responsibility of the Museum of the City of São Paulo, in Brazil. It was previously managed by the Department of Historic Heritage (DPH) of the Municipal Secretariat of Culture of São Paulo.

The site also houses the São Paulo Museum and Archeology Center, whose collection and administration are still under DPH's responsibility. Coordinated by Paula Nishida, the site is dedicated to excavations and scientific research by the Department of the Municipal Secretariat of Culture. The museum's collection contains around 1 million pieces.

== History ==
The Department of Historic Heritage (DPH) did extensive and intensive research in 1983 into the history of the complex. Soon it contributed to archeological and architectural investigations. The historian Márua Roseni Pacce was the leader in this process and worked together with archaeologists, restoration specialists, and other professionals.

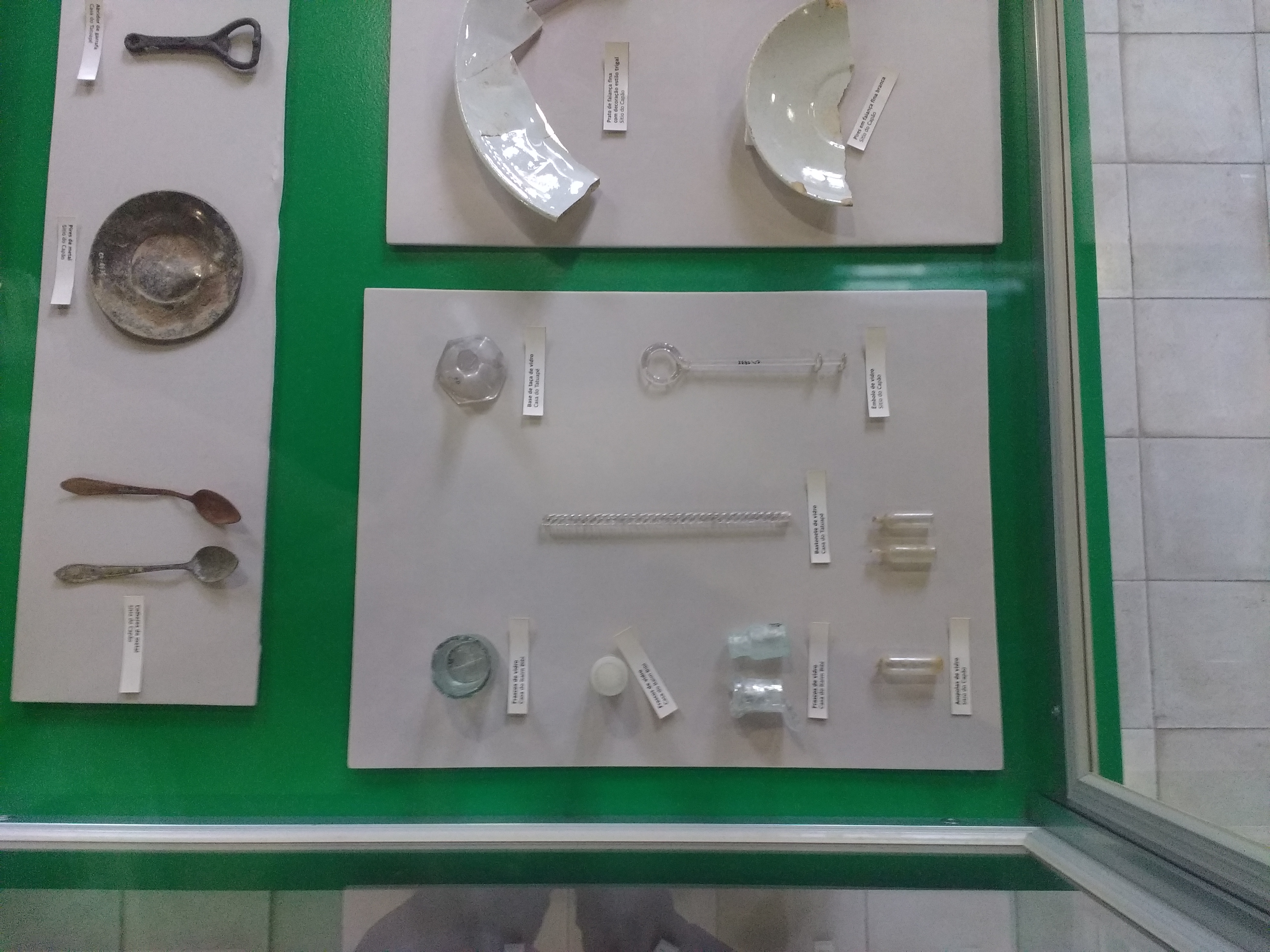
Artifacts from the Benedictine period.

Dr. Paulo Zanettini, owner of the company Zanettini Arqueologia, and coordinator of the archeological projects carried out at the site, tells about the process in the following words:

"I began my learning at the Morrinhos site in the 1980s, returning recently to carry out new investigations. It is a very rewarding job because the site is of great relevance to the history of the North Zone and São Paulo as a whole."

According to the survey, the main house was built in 1702. It is worth knowing that this date is written on the wood of the main entrance door of the house and that the first owners were Antônio Mendes de Almeida, Captain José de Góes e Moraes, Colonel Luiz Antônio Neves de Carvalho, and Francisco Antônio Baruel, Count of Milleville. The construction of the headquarters is attributed to José de Góis Morais, a wealthy Paulistan connected to mining.

In addition, it was discovered that the property was used as a resting farm, and also as a farmhouse where many rural activities were developed, such as pottery making, crop cultivation, cattle, and animal breeding. The labor used by the owners was essentially slave labor.

In 1902, exactly two hundred years after its construction, the complex was put up for auction because the Count could not pay his creditors. At the time, it was bought by the Paulistan Pedagogical Association, which represented the São Bento Monastery. Because of this, the old site began to have a new function, serving as a country house for the monastery members to rest on the weekends. Until the end of the 1940s, the property remained in the hands of the monastery. After this, there was a negotiation, in which the Camargo Correia S/A company became the new owner.

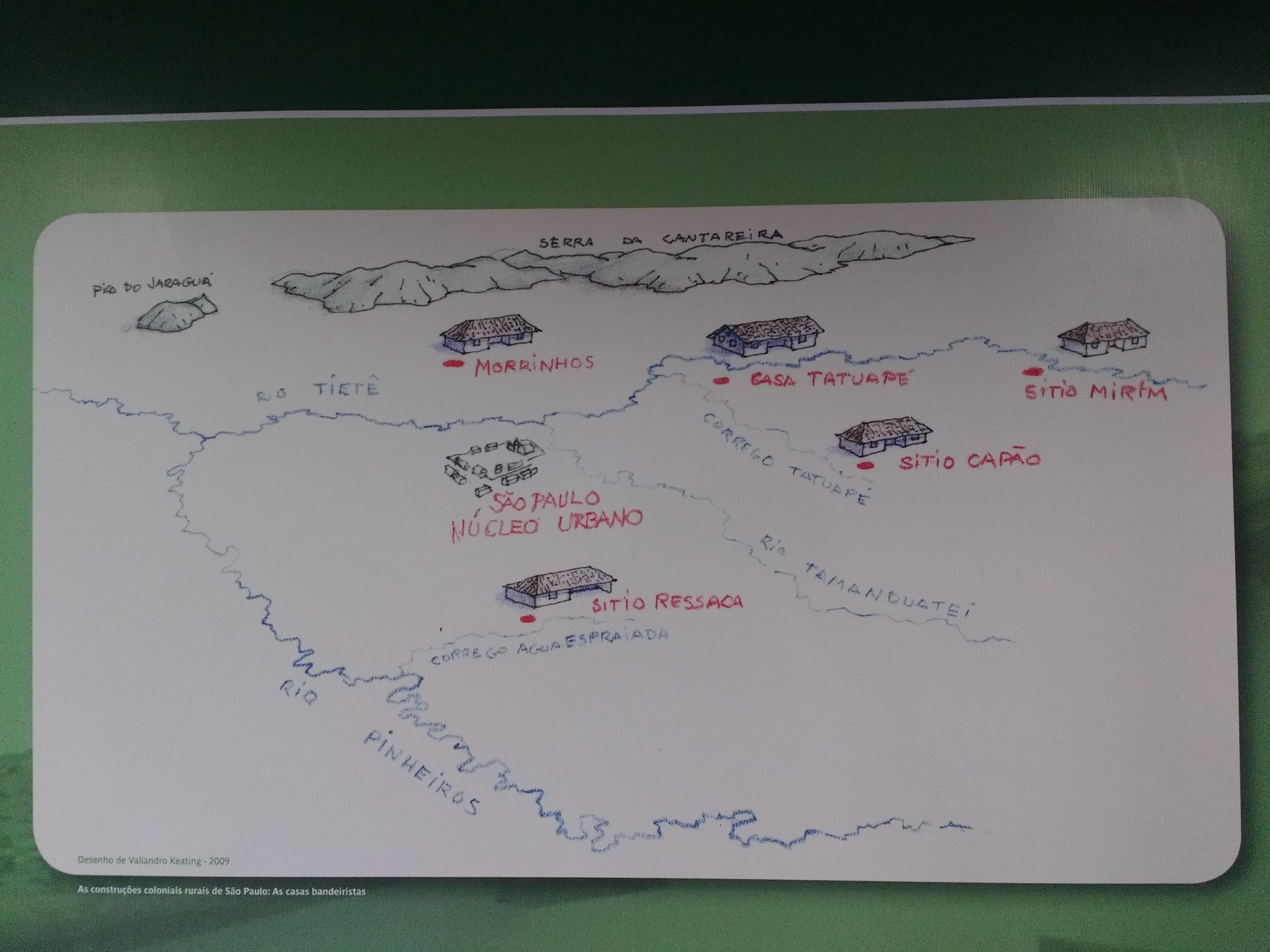
Drawing of the bandeirista houses contained in Sítio Morrinhos.

In 1948, this allowed the subdivision of the area around the site that was eventually named Jardim São Bento. This name is a tribute to the São Bento Monastery. However, the area was donated to the City of São Paulo by Sebastião Ferraz de Camargo, one of Camargo Correa's partners.

After these events, the two parts of the division had very different fates. While the new neighborhood, Jardim São Bento, prospered, with wide, tree-lined streets and high-standard housing, the historic site, in turn, suffered strong deterioration over the years.

Built with the rammed earth technique, Sítio Morrinhos survived without restoration for decades. As it has never been open to the public since its donation, it has been mostly forgotten. However, the course of the site changed when it underwent a structural intervention in the 1980s, a period when abandonment was at its peak.

After emergency work in 1984, Sítio Morrinhos would not be given a complete restoration until almost 20 years later, in 2000. A thorough restoration process was carried out, after exhaustive historical research and archaeological prospection work. A few years later, already fully restored, the site was opened to visitors, offering a collection of archaeological pieces.

=== Relevance ===
Rodolfo Bueno, one of the residents of the Jardim São Bento neighborhood recounts with nostalgia the visits to the property during his childhood "Sítio Morrinhos is very significant because it reminds me of sweet memories of my childhood. When I was a boy, I used to go there with my parents. At that time there was a caretaker. I can't remember his name, but I remember well his simple and helpful manner. He kept, by his own account, a small farm, and from there he made his living by selling chickens, eggs, chicks, and pigs. I loved going to that place, I used to watch those trees out front, and they are still there, just the way I knew them."

== Structure ==
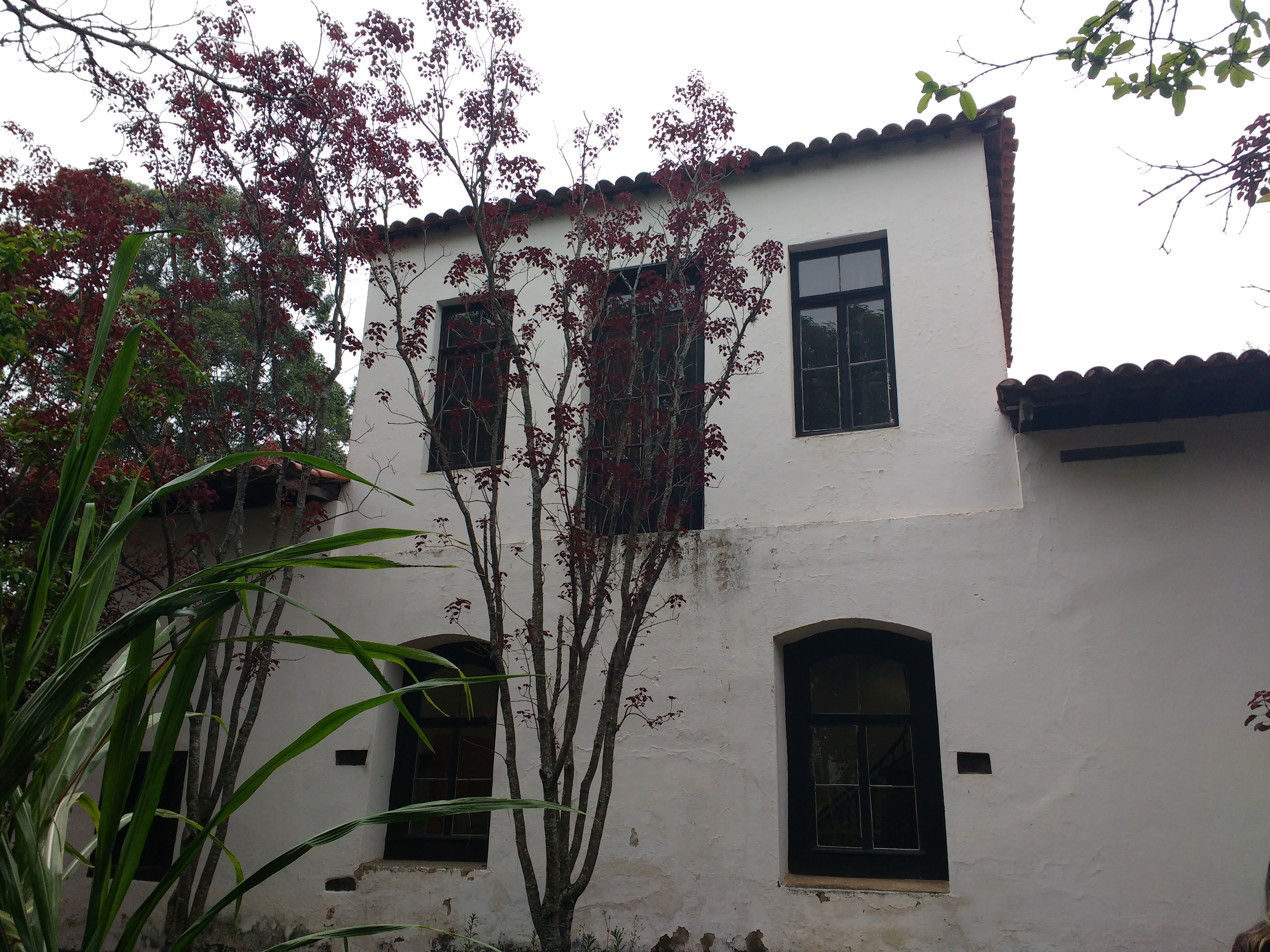
View from the back of the main house of Sitio Morrinhos.

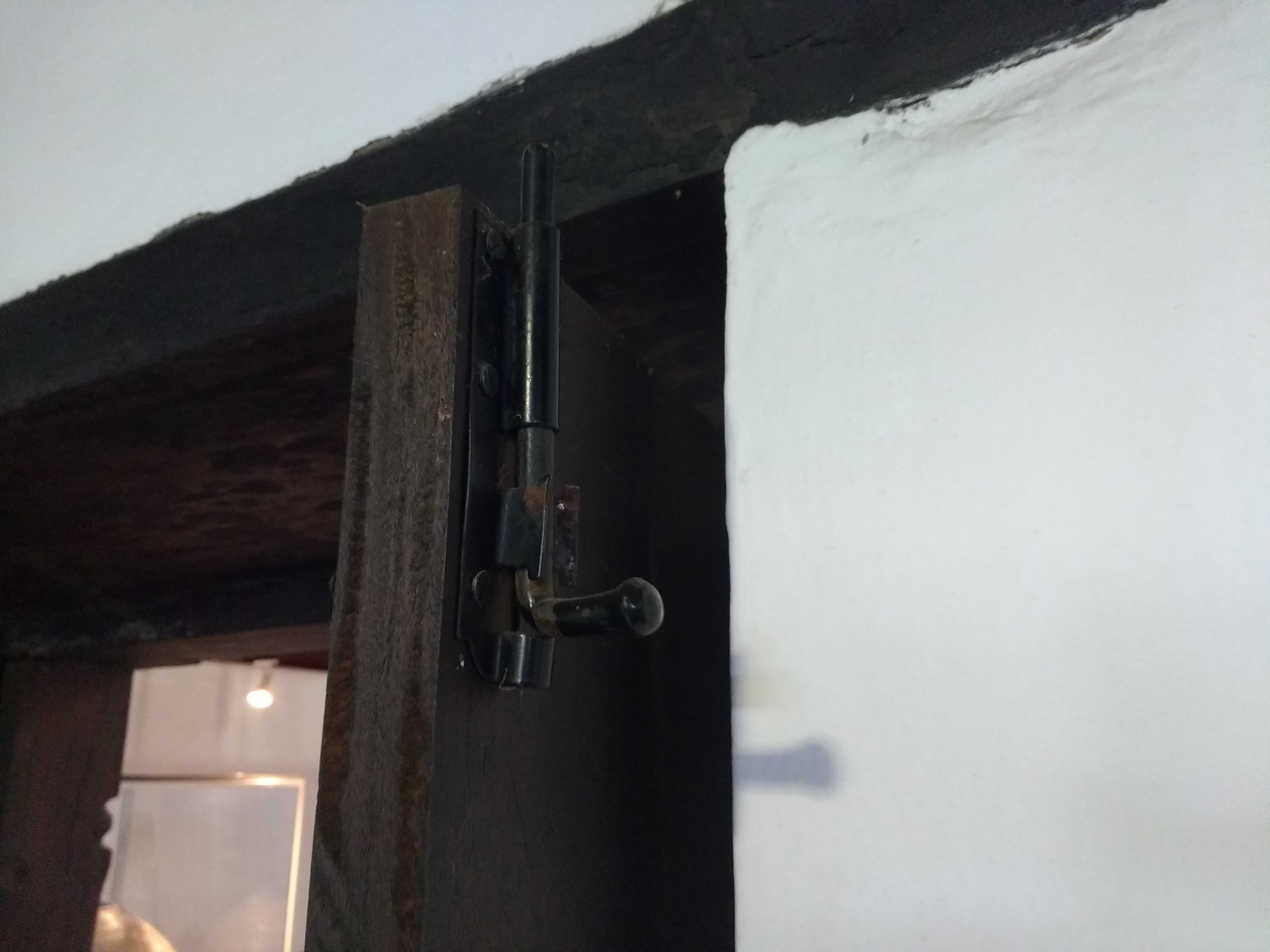
Lock made by the Benedictines.

Sítio Morrinhos was constructed with rammed earth, a technique that compresses and punches the earth into wooden molds and layers it until it reaches the desired thickness. The adjoining buildings are of brick masonry and were erected later, in the mid-nineteenth and early twentieth centuries. The structure of the site harkens back to the period when the bandeirantes explored parts toward the city in search of riches and settled in nearby villages.

The structure of the main house contains on the first floor five rooms and a porch, and on the second floor, there is one small bedroom ("camarinha"). The attached buildings, that served as senzalas (Note: Large dwellings that were used to house slaves in the mills and plantations of Colonial Brazil and the Empire of Brazil between the 16th and 19th centuries.) in the old days, are built of brick masonry.

== Complex ==
The space is often visited by schools. However, it does not receive the number of visitors expected of a museum and archaeological site of this size. The number of visitors per month averages 570. Among them, students of architecture are the majority.

The complex consists of a main house, a typical bandeirista style house from the colonial period, and annexed buildings. Among them are an activities area, and a library specialized in archeology, where it is possible to consult and photograph records on archeological history.

At the site, besides the archeology center and the exhibition space, there is an auditorium that contains audio and image equipment geared toward lectures.

Currently, a total preservation area of 20,000 square meters is estimated.

== São Paulo Archeology Center ==
The Sitio Morrinhos Museum is also home to the São Paulo Archeology Center since 2009. The center's main focus is São Paulo archeology and its scientific discoveries. The documents and artifacts are from the 18th to 20th centuries, coming from the excavations and archeological research carried out by the Department of Historical Heritage (DPH) throughout the capital of São Paulo. In total, the collection has 100 thousand objects. The items on display are from up to 8 thousand years ago and tell stories from prehistory to the present day. Most of these are stored in boxes, away from public view.

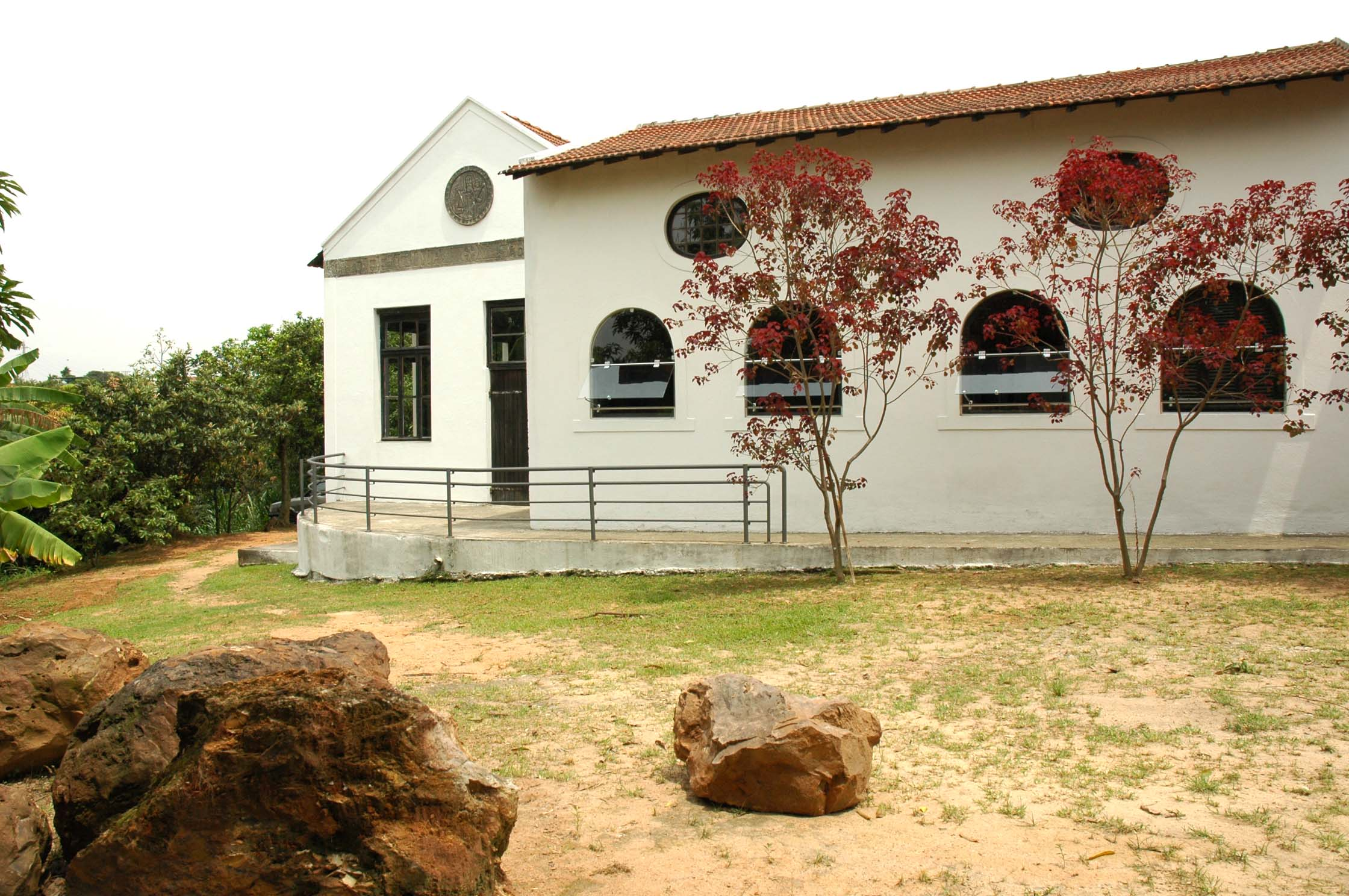
View from the left side next to the entrance gate of Sítio Morrinhos.

The financing of the center was done through judicial compensation. In 2006, the Morumbi Lithic Site (one of the main archeological sites in São Paulo) was held by three real estate companies that damaged it during a construction project. The companies were sued by the Federal Public Ministry and were obliged to pay for the maintenance of the conservation works of Sitio Morrinhos and the implementation of the center.

The center is coordinated by archaeologist Paula Noshida since 2010. In a report, Paula tells about the work of professionals in her area: "We archaeologists work with a context, a sum of factors and data that can tell us about the populations, societies or groups that produced these pieces. That said, I consider all the pieces interesting, especially the set of artifacts that represent the Morumbi Lithic Site because it brings us the history of the populations that inhabited the city of São Paulo between 5,000 and 6,000 years ago and that is not known to most people."

== Location ==
The site is located at the top of the hill at 102 Santo Anselmo Street, Jardim São Bento, in the northern part of São Paulo. It is surrounded by many leafy trees. Thus, even though it has a tourist attraction sign, it goes unnoticed by people passing by Avenue Braz Leme, approximately 290 meters away. There are well-known landmarks around the site, such as Campo de Marte, Marginal Tietê, and downtown buildings. From inside the site, among the trees, one can see them.

== Gallery ==
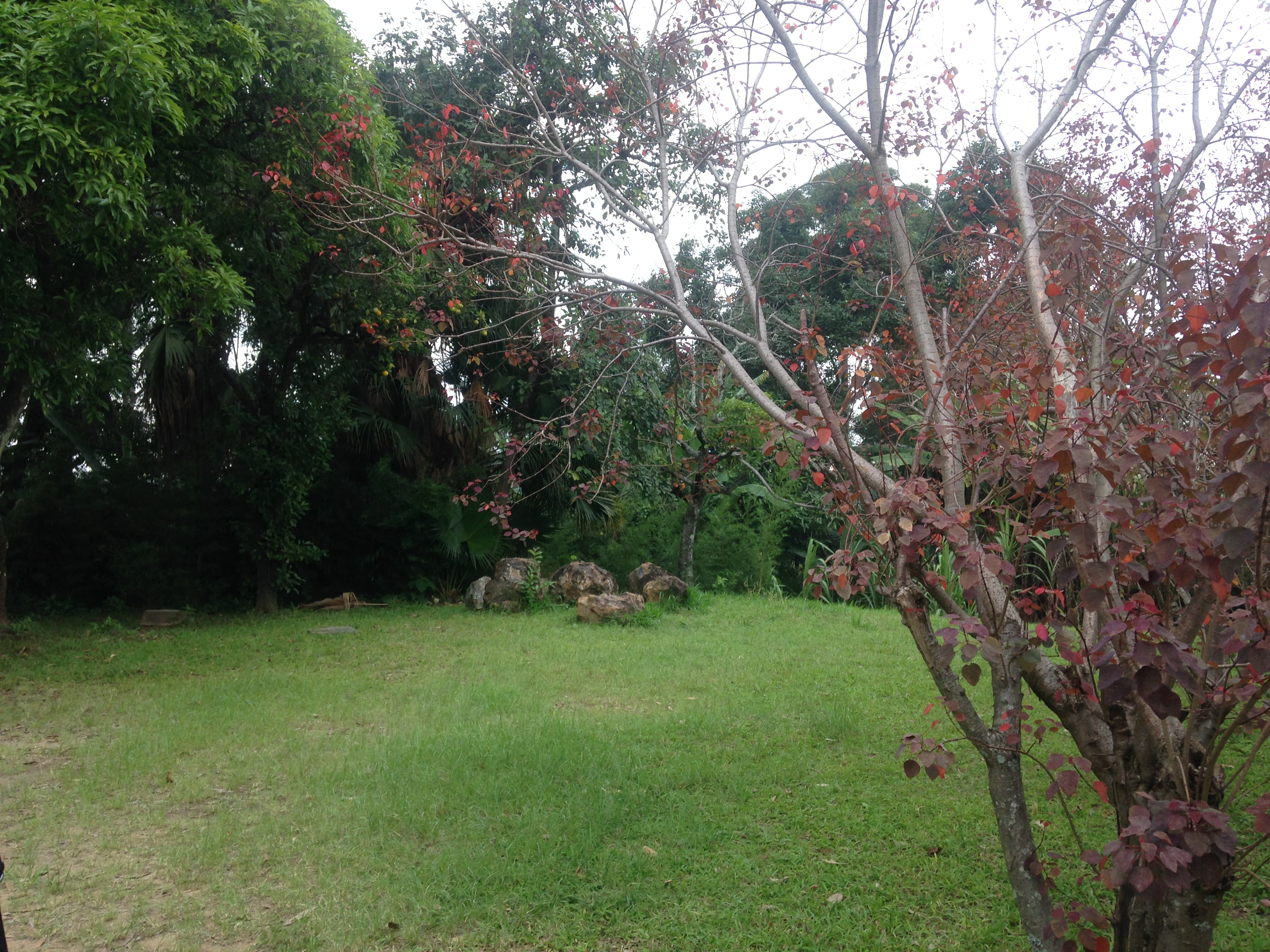
Garden.

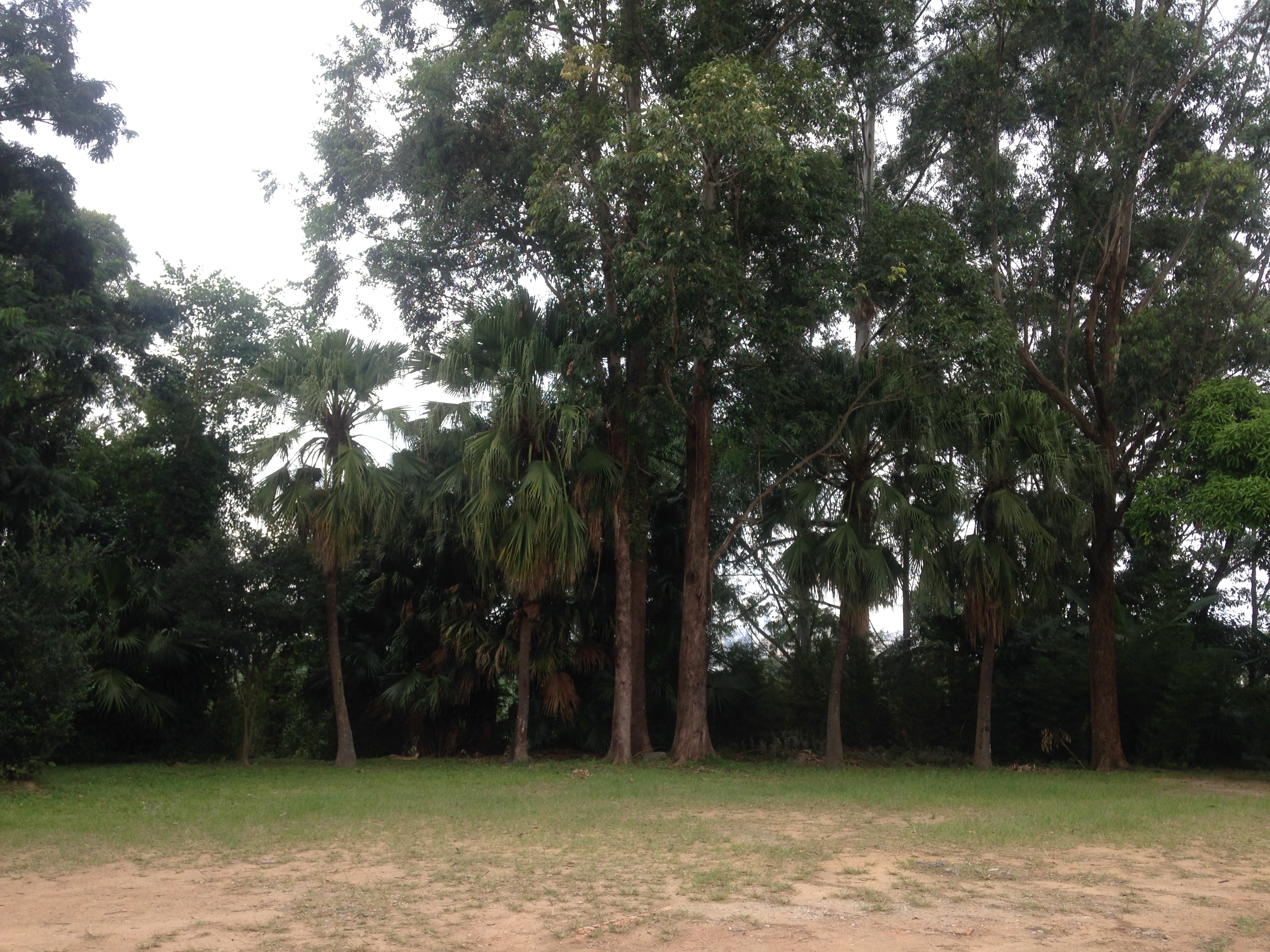
Garden with the trees around the complex.

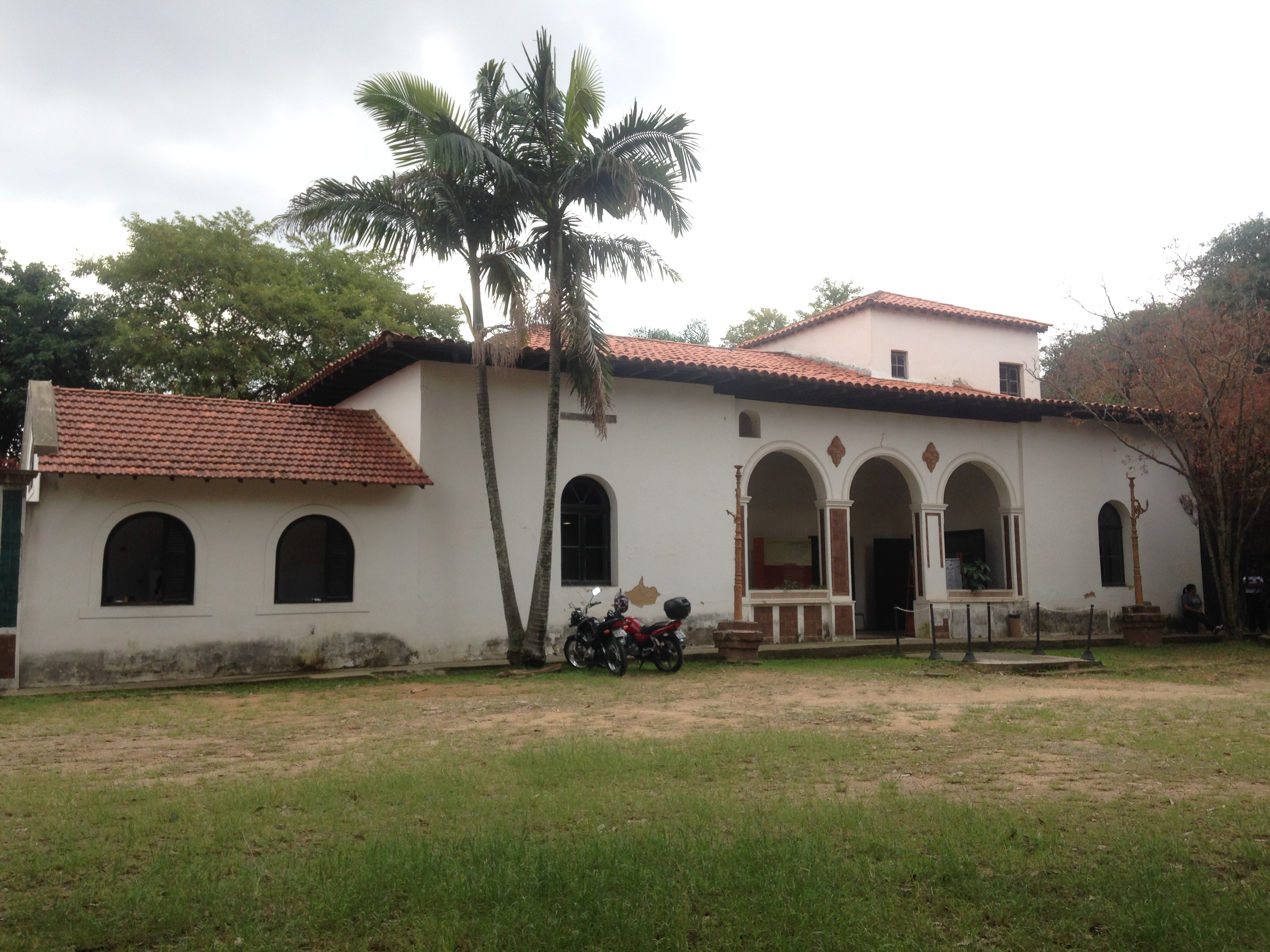
Façade.

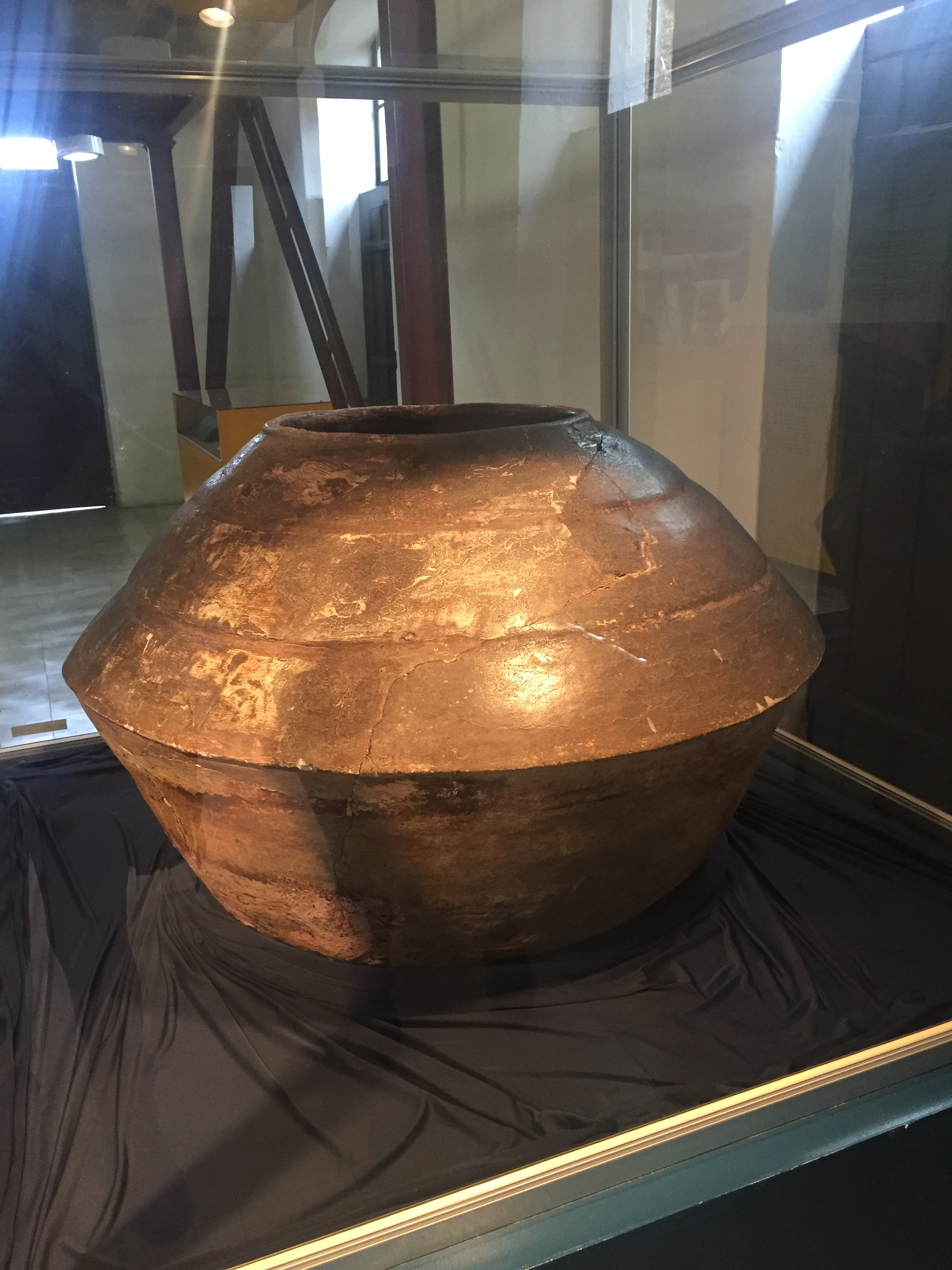
Funeral urn used to bury bodies before coffins were invented.

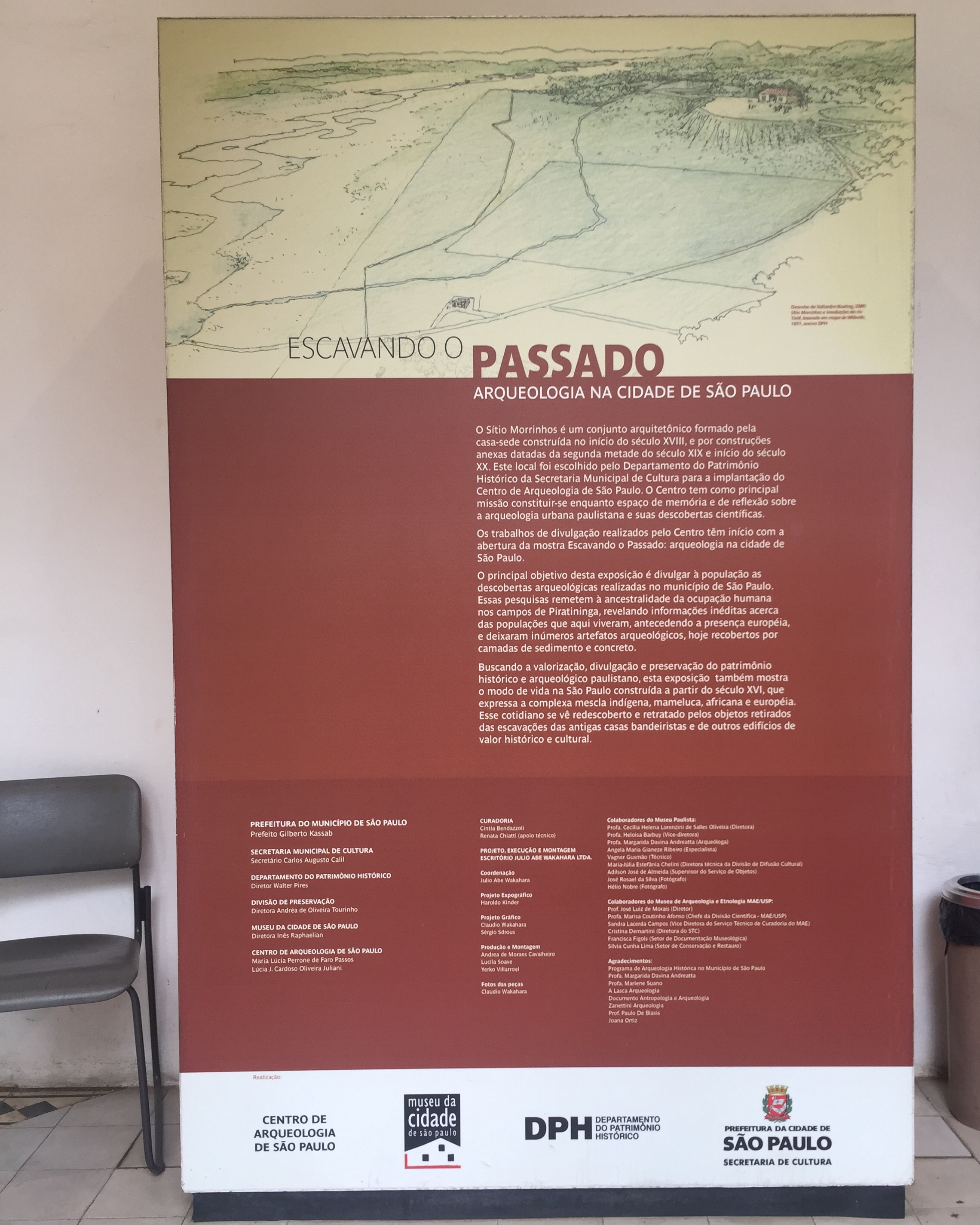
Banner explaining the museum at the entrance.

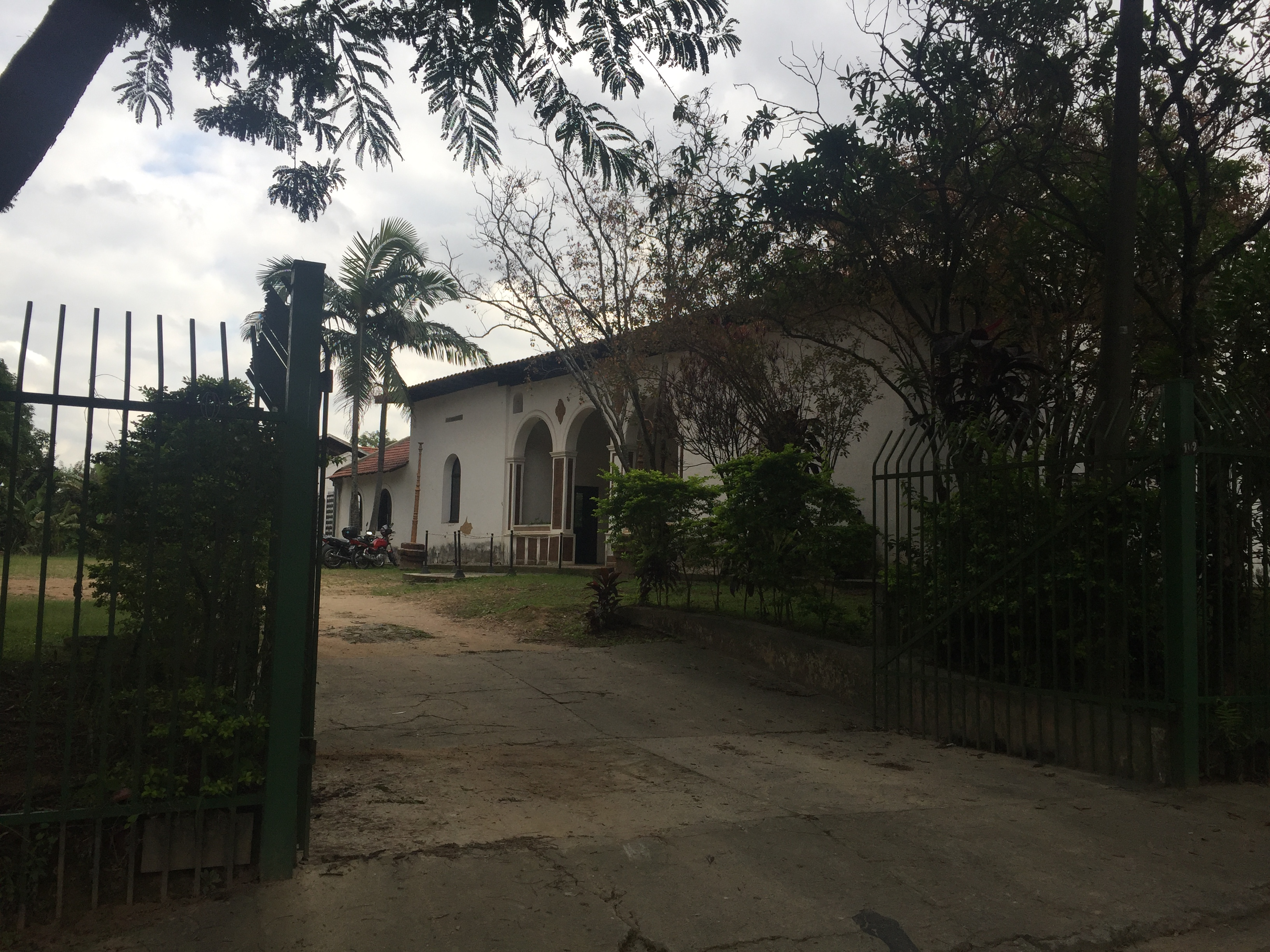
Entrance to the Sítio Morrinhos complex.

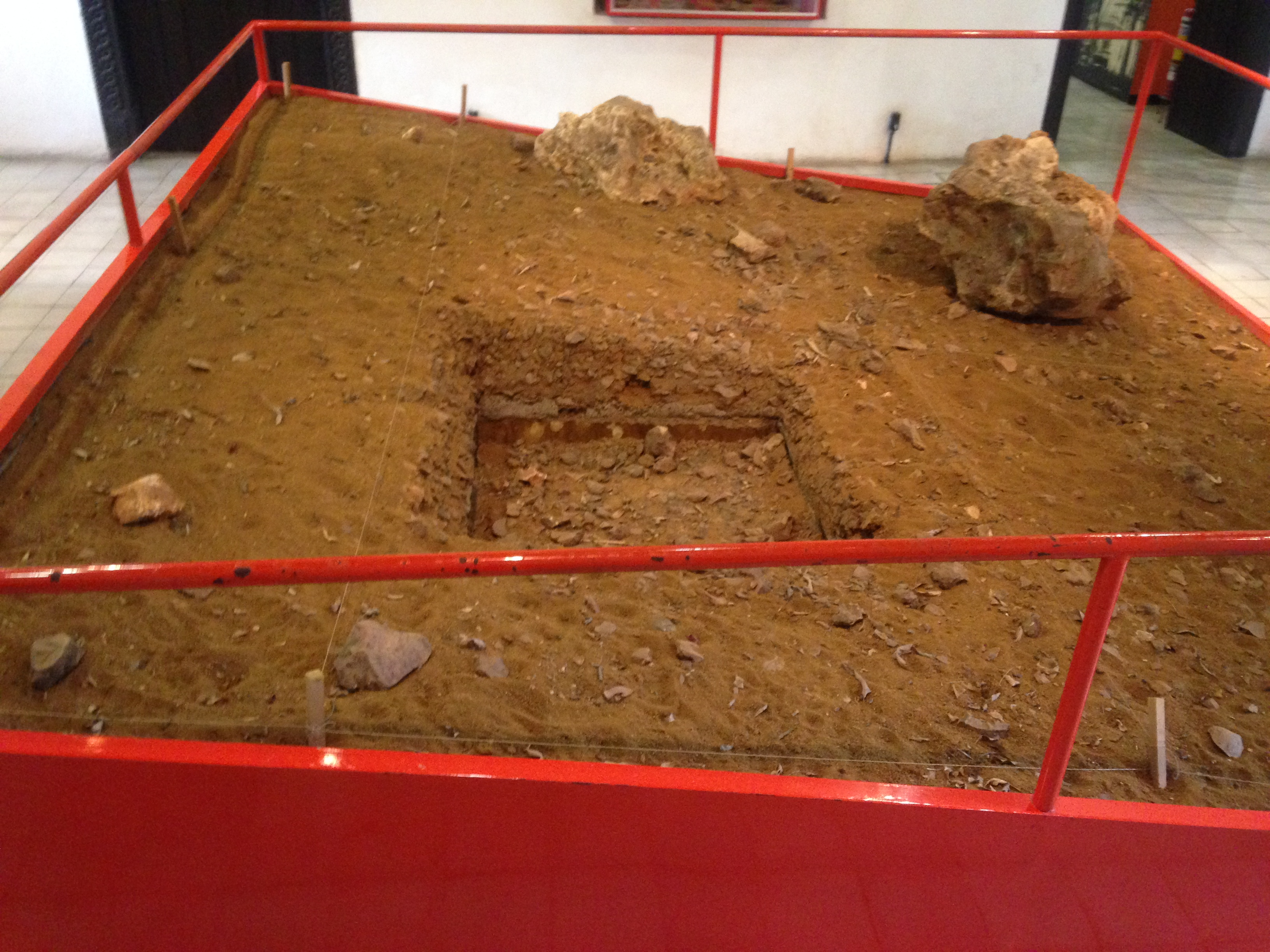
Representation of the original excavation of the Morumbi Museum.

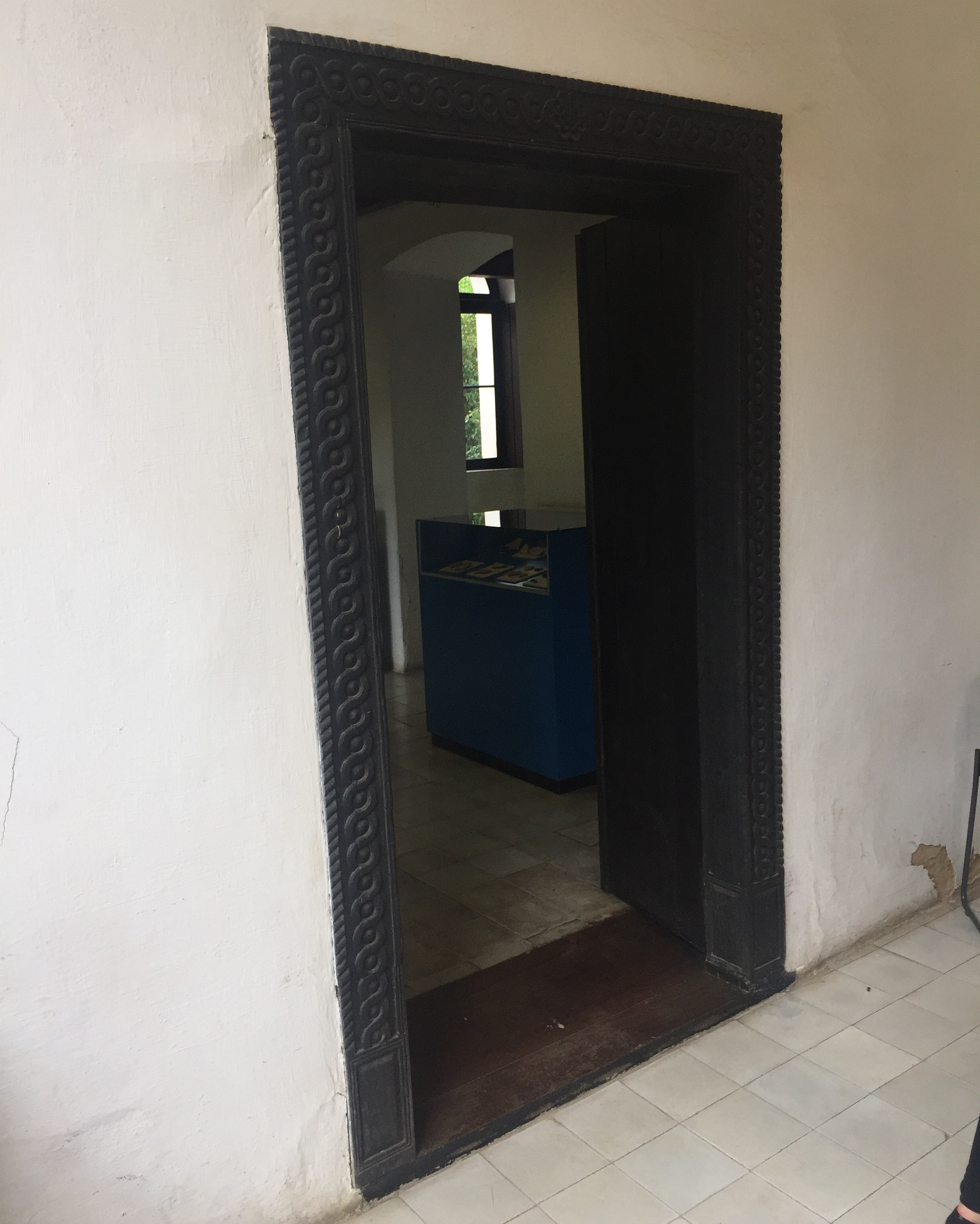
Door with ornament details.

== See also ==
- Sertanista House
- Butantã's House
- Casa do Sítio Tatuapé
- Solar da Marquesa de Santos
- Colonial architecture of Brazil
