= Butantã's House =

Building in São Paulo, Brazil

- Casa do Butantã
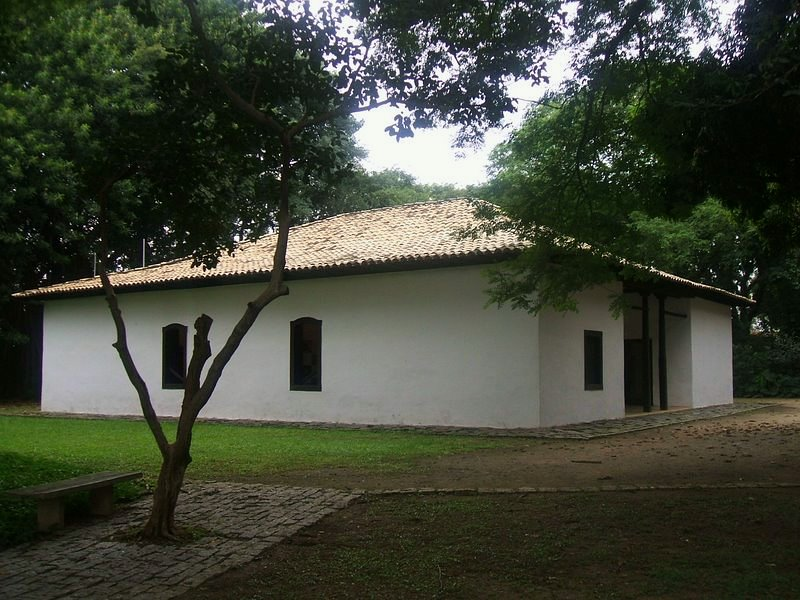

- Location within São Paulo
- Alternative names: Bandeirante's House

General information
- Type: House
- Architectural style: Colonial style, Bandeirista style
- Classification: State heritage (CONDEPHAAT)
- Location: São Paulo, Brazil
- Coordinates: 23°33′40″S 46°42′35″W

The Butantã's House (Portuguese: Casa do Butantã), also known as the Bandeirante's House (Casa do Bandeirante), is a historic building constructed in the Bandeirista architectural style during the Brazilian colonial period. It is located in the Butantã district of São Paulo, Brazil. Built in the first half of the 18th century, the house represents a typical model of rural dwellings in São Paulo from that era and was originally situated in a large area on the outskirts of the city’s early urban center. The building serves as a rare example of colonial architecture that has witnessed the urban and social transformations of São Paulo since the early centuries of Portuguese colonization. Its structure preserves elements characteristic of São Paulo's colonial construction techniques, particularly taipa de pilão (rammed earth) and taipa de mão (wattle and daub), both commonly used in Bandeirista architecture.

Currently the site on which the house stands constitutes the Monteiro Lobato Square. This space was reserved for the preservation of the property when the neighborhood was developed by the City Company. During the 1950s, for the commemorations of the 4th Centennial of the city of São Paulo, the house was the object of a restoration project by Luís Saia. The house was listed by the Council for the Defense of Historical, Archaeological, Artistic and Tourist Heritage (Conselho de Defesa do Patrimônio Histórico, Arqueológico, Artístico e Turístico - CONDEPHAAT) in 1982.

== History ==
=== Historical context ===
The Treaty of Tordesillas, concluded in 1494, named a meridian 370 leagues from the archipelago of Cape Verde, giving the land east of this line to Portugal, and the land west to Spain. Inaccuracies in the exact demarcation of this line led to disputes between the two kingdoms. While the Portuguese claimed that the line passed through the region of present-day Buenos Aires, the Spanish maintained that it passed through Cananéia. To secure Portuguese occupation of the American territories between 1543 and 1536, King John III of Portugal divided Brazil into hereditary captaincies. These divisions were unequal in extent, requiring a subsequent redistribution of land. From 1580 onward, following the Iberian Union under Philip II of Spain, the inhabitants of São Paulo—known as Paulistas—turned their attention to Paraguay and the Potosí mines. At the end of the 16th century, the captaincy of São Vicente had become the main point of expansion into the interior (sertão).

Since 1530, the Portuguese understanding of territorial occupation had been shaped by natural borders, particularly the major rivers. As a seafaring nation, and given the abundance of rivers in Brazilian territory, inland expansion was guided by river courses. The river basins also defined the regions occupied by indigenous populations, who, despite lacking formal territorial borders, fiercely defended their lands through warfare. With the arrival of the colonizers, these conflicts translated into shifting alliances with either the Portuguese or the Spanish.

The complex fluvial system formed by the Grande, Pinheiros, Tamanduateí, and Tietê rivers made the Piratininga plateau an ideal forward connection towards the basins of the Paraguay, Paraná and Uruguay Rivers. Simultaneously, it facilitated efficient circulation within the plateau itself. The routes connecting the coast of São Vicente to the Piratininga plateau followed pre-existing Indigenous trails. This network of roads, combining land and river paths, provided access to the sertão, extending toward Paraguay and the frontier between Portuguese and Spanish domains.

Bandeirista houses were distributed across the territory to secure control of land and river routes. In addition to defending the Piratininga plateau, they served as logistical bases for expeditions into the sertão. On the Spanish side, the frontier policy relied on Jesuit missions, which were established to protect strategic routes and prevent Paulista incursions into Paraguayan territory.

In the early decades of the 17th century, Jesuit missions were concentrated in three main regions: Itatim (in present-day Mato Grosso do Sul), Guairá (south of the Paranapanema River, current Paraná) and Tape (central region of Rio Grande do Sul). These attacks took place between 1616 and 1648. With the Jesuit threat neutralized and territorial control secured, the Paulistas launched a series of exploratory expeditions in search of precious metals and stones in Brazil’s interior. In 1640, after the restoration of Portuguese independence, the Paulistas also took part in the campaigns that expelled the Dutch from the Northeast. These expeditions led to the discovery of mineral-rich areas in Minas Gerais, Goiás, and Cuiabá. The bandeirista houses, initially built as expedition bases, evolved into the headquarters of large agricultural estates that supplied the mining regions.

On the Spanish side, Jesuit missions were established west of the Uruguay, Paraná, and Paraguay rivers, occupying the area between Spanish colonies. The Portuguese vision of territorial boundaries based on river systems ultimately prevailed, overriding the abstract demarcation set by the Treaty of Tordesillas. The Tietê River remained a primary route of penetration into the interior, linking São Paulo to Mato Grosso through the use of monsoons.

Adapted to serve as estate headquarters, the bandeirista houses remained in use until the introduction of coffee cultivation, which brought about new architectural styles. Despite these changes, rivers continued to function as natural boundaries.

=== Bandeirista houses in São Paulo ===
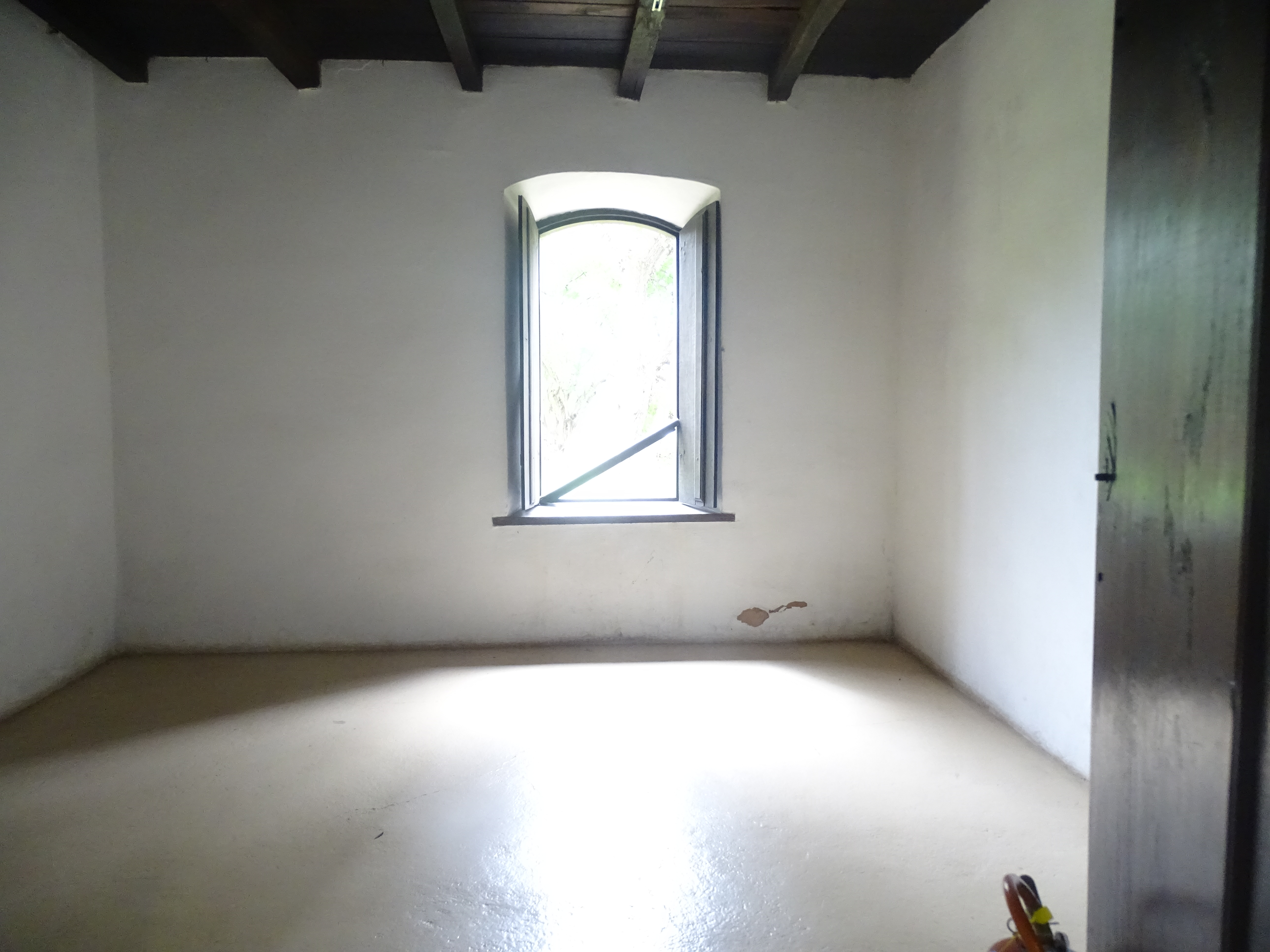
One of the rooms of the Bandeirante's House.

São Paulo was originally founded under the name Piratininga. Seeking to distance themselves from the Crown’s direct control and to find a climate more similar to that of Europe, Jesuits and Portuguese settlers of modest means left the coast, crossed the Serra do Mar mountain range, and established the settlement inland. For an extended period, the population was composed primarily of impoverished settlers and Indigenous peoples living near the villages. One of the main responses to the economic hardship of the region was the organization of expeditions into the sertão in search of gold and for the capture of Indigenous peoples from enemy tribes. These expeditions gave rise to the Bandeiras and to the Bandeirantes—the term used for the Portuguese settlers who led or participated in such ventures.

The Bandeirante’s House is a preserved example of architecture from the period of São Paulo’s early development. It was originally located on lands known as Uvatantan, a Tupi-Guarani language term meaning "very hard land". This area is now part of the Butantã district. The land initially belonged to the Portuguese settler Afonso Sardinha and his wife, who bequeathed it to the Jesuit order. The house later passed through several owners, none of whom were Bandeirantes. Despite this, the house acquired the name "Bandeirante’s House" in 1954, during the celebrations of São Paulo’s 400th anniversary. The naming was part of an initiative to recreate a site representing the Bandeirante period in mid-20th-century São Paulo. Located near the banks of the Pinheiros River, the house is a rare surviving example of colonial-era architecture in the city. It is notable for its construction in taipa de pilão (rammed earth) and its high ceilings. While the Pinheiros River was straightened in the 20th century, the house remains close to its original riverside location. At the time of its construction, proximity to water was practical, as rivers were the primary means of transportation.

=== Bandeirantes ===
The Bandeirantes were individuals active during the 16th and 17th centuries in colonial Brazil who undertook expeditions into the interior in search of gold, precious stones, and Indigenous people to enslave. These expeditions were generally divided into two categories: Bandeiras, which were privately organized, and Entradas, which were organized by the colonial government. The routes followed the river systems of the region, particularly the Tietê and Pinheiros Rivers. The best known bandeirantes were Manuel Borba Gato, Fernão Dias Pais Leme and Bartolomeu Buenou da Silva. They came mainly from the towns of São Paulo and São Vicente. They were among the first Europeans to explore the interior of what is now Brazil.

=== Owners ===
Following the expulsion of the Jesuits in 1759 and the confiscation of their assets, the property was put up for public auction. It is likely that during this period the house passed into private hands, eventually becoming the property of the Vieira de Medeiros family. The family later sold the estate to the City Company of Land and Improvement. Recognizing the historical significance of the structure, then referred to as the “Old Butantã House,” the company donated both the house and the entire city block on which it stands to the Municipality of São Paulo.

== Architecture ==
=== Features ===
The Bandeirante's House is considered one of the most faithful representations of the living conditions of the Bandeirantes and Paulista rural landowners of the colonial period. The rectangular structure measures 17.70 by 20.20 meters and is composed of twelve rooms, each with a defined function. The building includes two porches—one at the front and one at the rear. The front porch features a low wall approximately one meter in height.

The main entrance opens into a central living room that provides access to the other primary rooms. A second door leads to the dining room, which is adjacent to two smaller rooms. One of these was likely used for domestic work and contained objects such as a weaving loom, spinning wheel, folding machine, and hammock loom. This room connects to the rear porch, which in turn provides access to a storage area used for harnesses and baskets, and which also functioned as a workshop. Another room was used to store food and drinking water. One of the doors leads to a small chapel where masses and novenas were held. The bedrooms were originally lined with wide planks of Ocotea catharinensis. These were removed after the house was vacated by former occupants. The windows in the bedrooms were secured with wooden bars, and the rooms were occasionally used as a form of confinement for children as a disciplinary measure.

Stoves were not commonly used in rural Paulista residences during the 17th and much of the 18th centuries. No traces of indoor stoves were found in the Bandeirante’s House, suggesting that outdoor cooking—on stones, in accordance with Indigenous practices—was adopted. Cooking likely occurred on the rear veranda, which provided ventilation for smoke and easy access to the backyard. The house has a wide, sloped roof, designed to facilitate the runoff of rainwater and fallen debris. It is covered with canal tiles, which offer limited protection against cold fronts and strong winds. The floor is constructed of rammed earth, a common technique during the period.

=== Wattle and daub wall ===
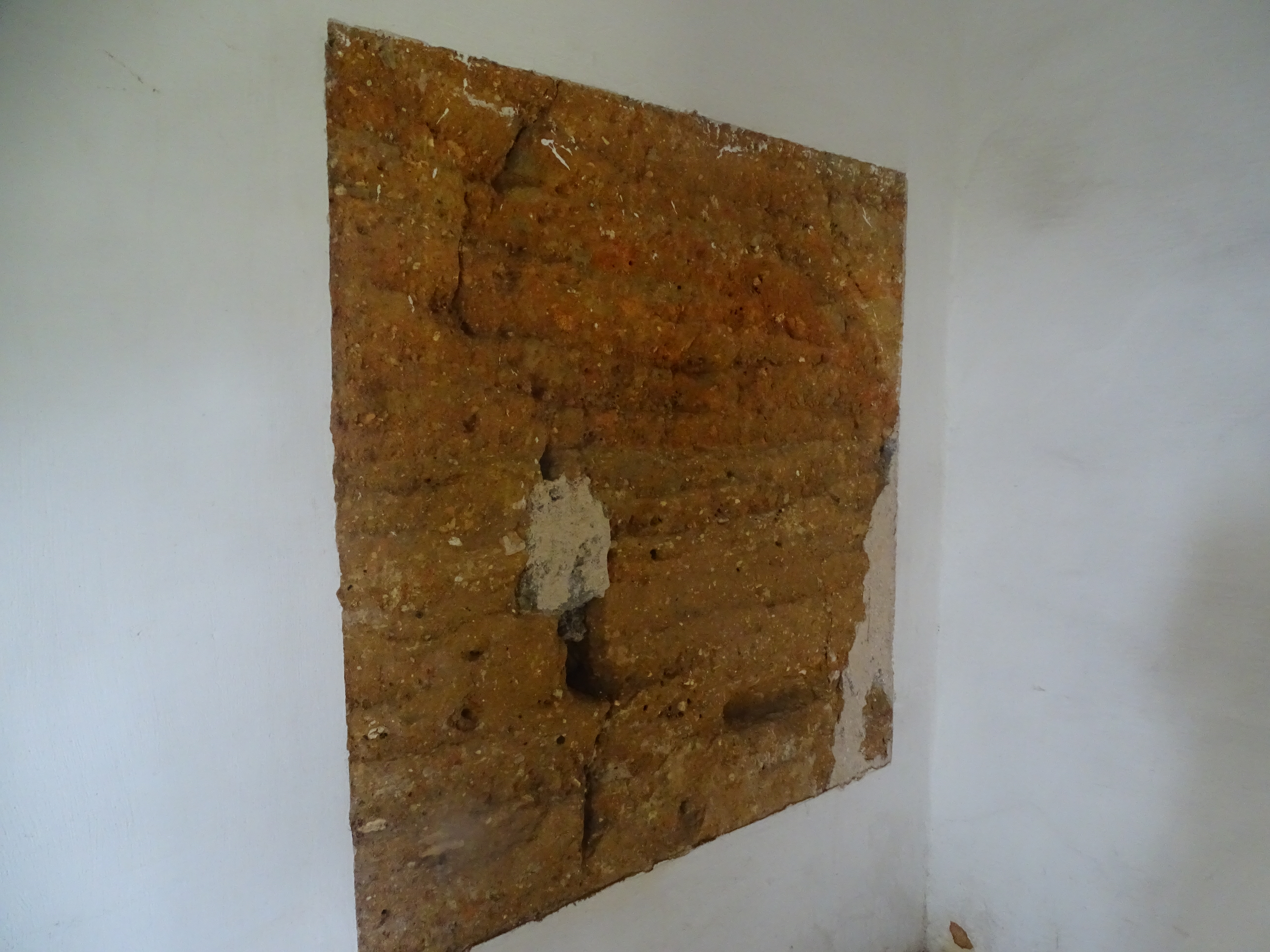
Wattle and daub wall.

Bandeirista houses are notable for their construction using wattle and daub, a traditional building method employing rammed earth. This technique was widely used in São Paulo for more than two centuries and proved to be more durable than previously assumed. The walls of the Bandeirante’s House reach 5.5 meters in height and are approximately 50 centimeters thick. The building features a distinctive structural design consisting of two rectangular rings of walls. The inner ring defines the main distribution rooms, while the outer ring outlines the external boundaries of the house and is interrupted by the two porches. The average height of the walls is 3.8 meters. Additional walls connect and reinforce the two main structural rings.

=== External area ===
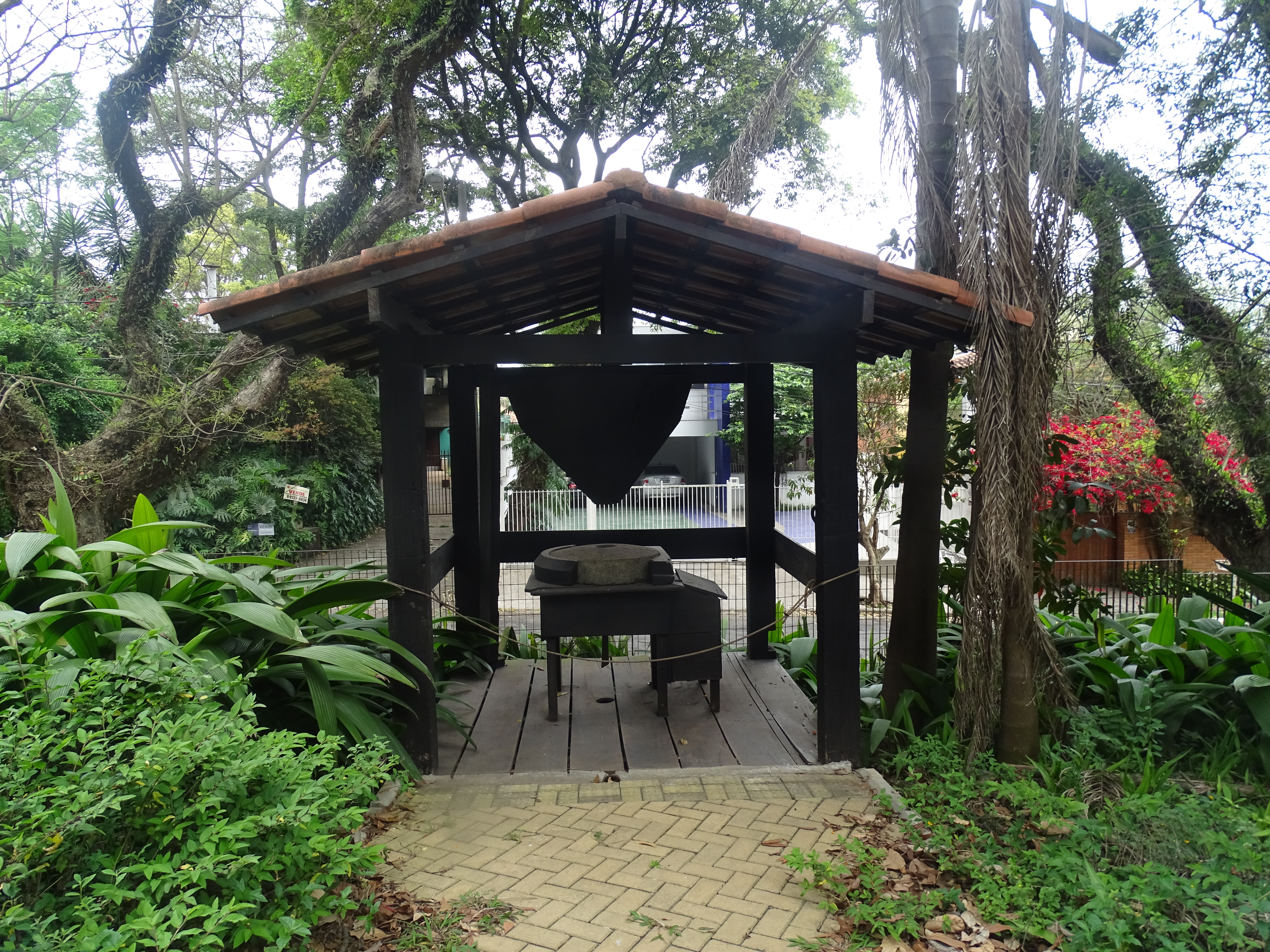
Maize milling instrument.

Historically, a wall constructed from wattle and daub surrounded the house, enclosing the land on all sides except the riverside. A large wooden gate allowed entry. These walls were built for defense, particularly in response to the presence of Indigenous groups in the surrounding area. There are two gardens near the house. The larger one, planted with trees such as silk floss trees, faced the Pinheiros River and was accessible through a gate. The smaller garden, located to the left of the entrance, was reserved for private use by the residents and featured ornamental plants, including begonias and climbing vines. A bed of medicinal plants was also maintained. Near the exit leading to the old riverbed of the Pinheiros River, a maize mill—still present today—was used since the house's early years.

== Current status ==
=== Heritage and cultural importance ===
Originally built for residential purposes, bandeirista houses gradually acquired additional meanings as they were incorporated into the municipal public heritage. Although there is no documentary evidence confirming that Bandeirantes or Sertanistas (explorers of the sertão) lived in the house, the Bandeirante’s House was restored to serve as a symbol of this historical period. The building became a cultural site designed to represent a specific interpretation of São Paulo’s past, particularly from the 1950s onward, when such houses were converted into museums. Today, the Bandeirante’s House is recognized as a cultural space capable of supporting diverse museological practices and public engagement. It is part of the city’s protected heritage and is located in a zone with regulations that ensure the preservation of its historical and architectural context.

- Heritage Registration Process Number: 22262/82
- Heritage Resolution: Resolution No. 02 of January 24, 1983

=== Restoration ===
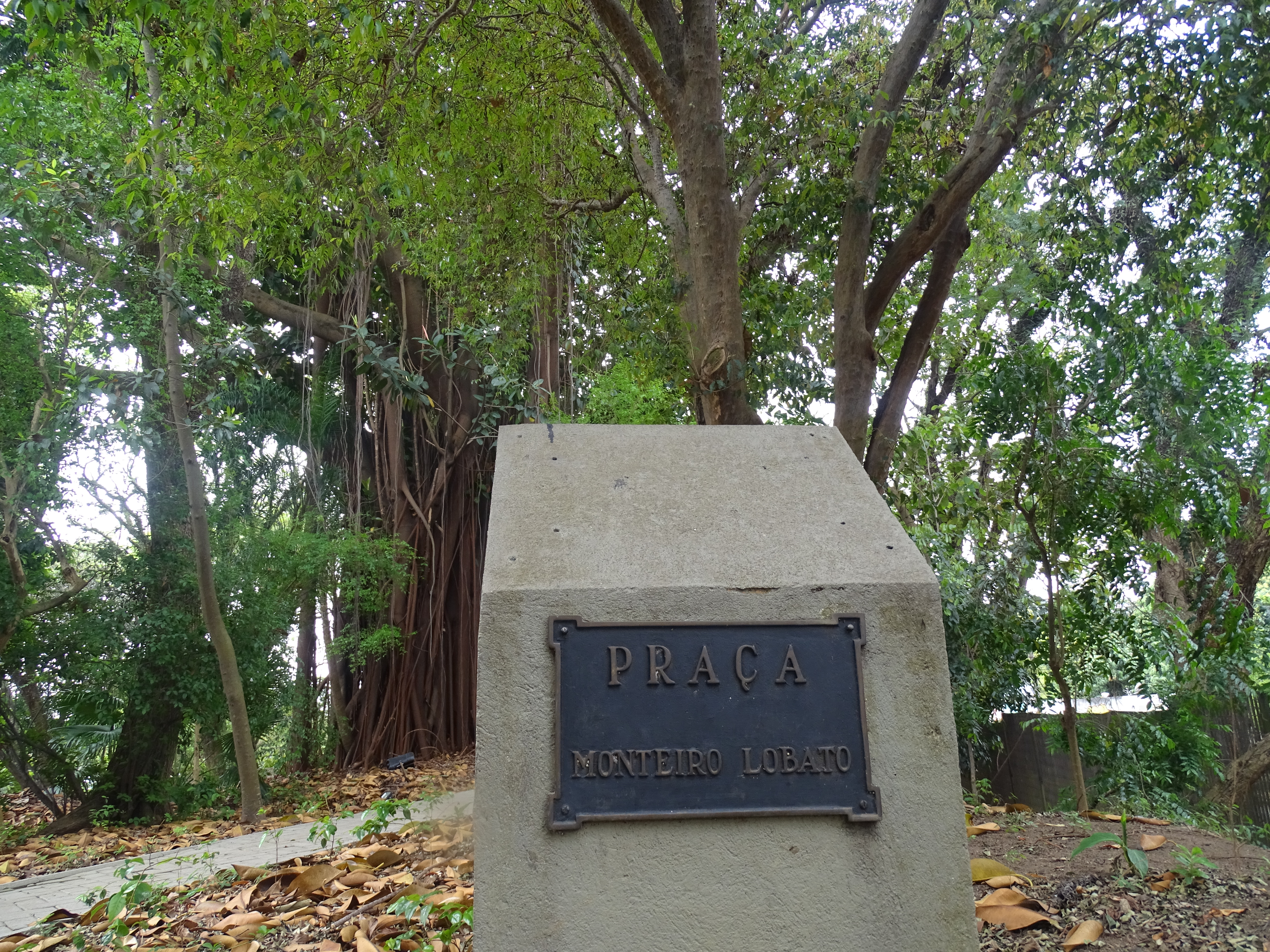
Nowadays, the exterior has become the Monteiro Lobato Square.

In March 1954, Guilherme de Almeida, then president of the Commission for the IV Centennial of the City of São Paulo, sought to lend a regional character to the anniversary celebrations by highlighting the city’s historical past. He proposed the restoration of the Bandeirante’s House, which at the time was abandoned and at risk of collapse. The aim was to recreate the environment of a typical rural residence from the Bandeirante era by furnishing the house with period-appropriate furniture and objects. The restoration project was made possible through the intervention of Carlos A. Gomes Cardim Filho, and the house was officially granted to the IV Centennial Commission by the mayor. The overall direction of the restoration was assigned to Paulo Camilher Florençano. Technical aspects of the architectural restoration were overseen by Luiz Saia of the National Historic and Artistic Heritage Board (SPHAN), who addressed the challenges of preserving a structure of this kind with great care. Benedito Pacheco was hired as the lead technician. Landscaping and garden services were managed by Artur Etzel, director of the City Hall Parks Department.

=== Nowadays ===
Over the course of more than 450 years, the city of São Paulo has undergone significant transformations. Buildings such as the Bandeirante’s House serve as rare physical links to its early history. In recent years, the house has hosted various cultural events, exhibitions, and performances, expanding its role as a museum dedicated to preserving and presenting the history of the bandeirista period and the broader development of São Paulo.

=== Gallery ===
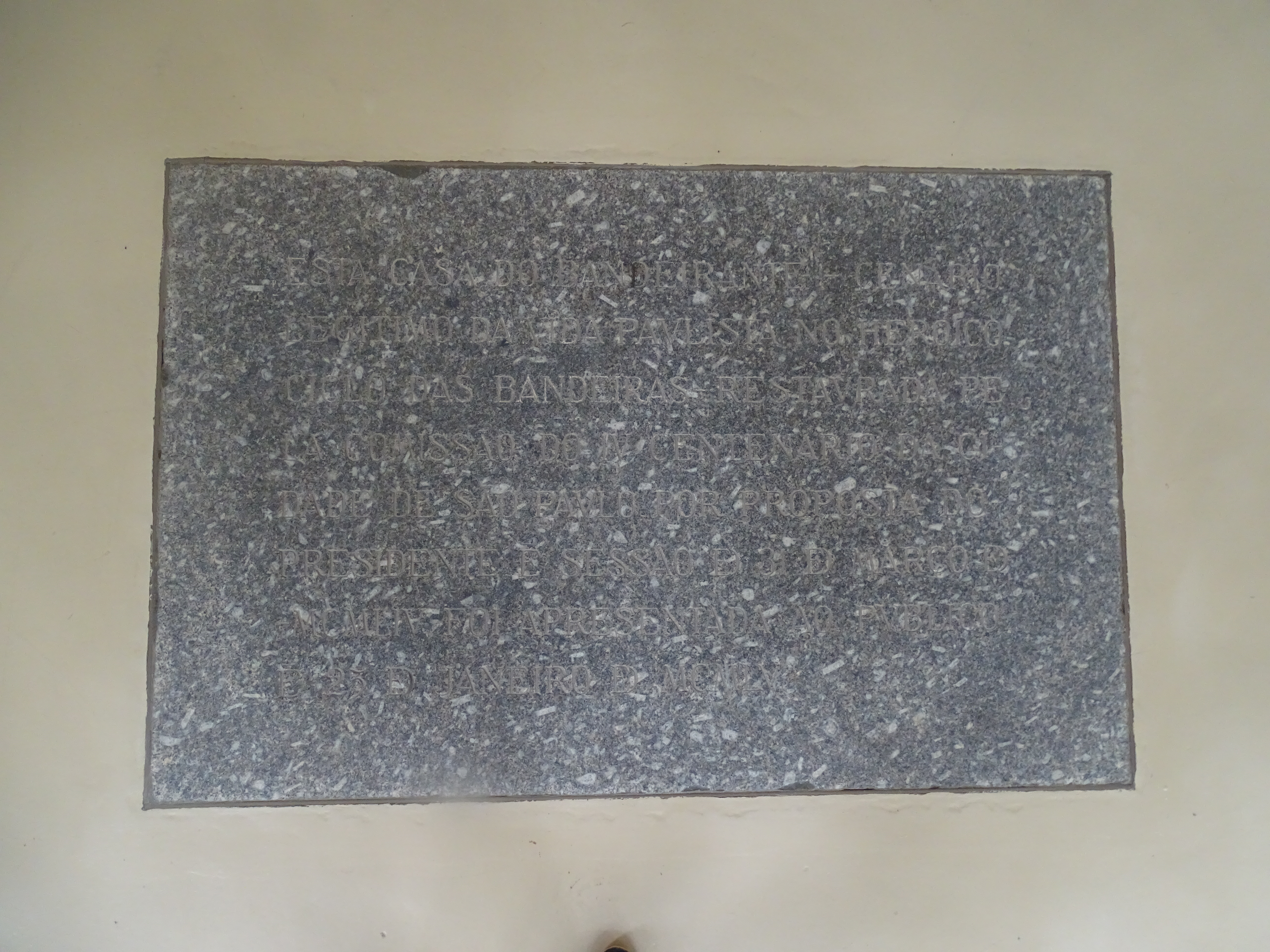
Floor sign at the entrance.

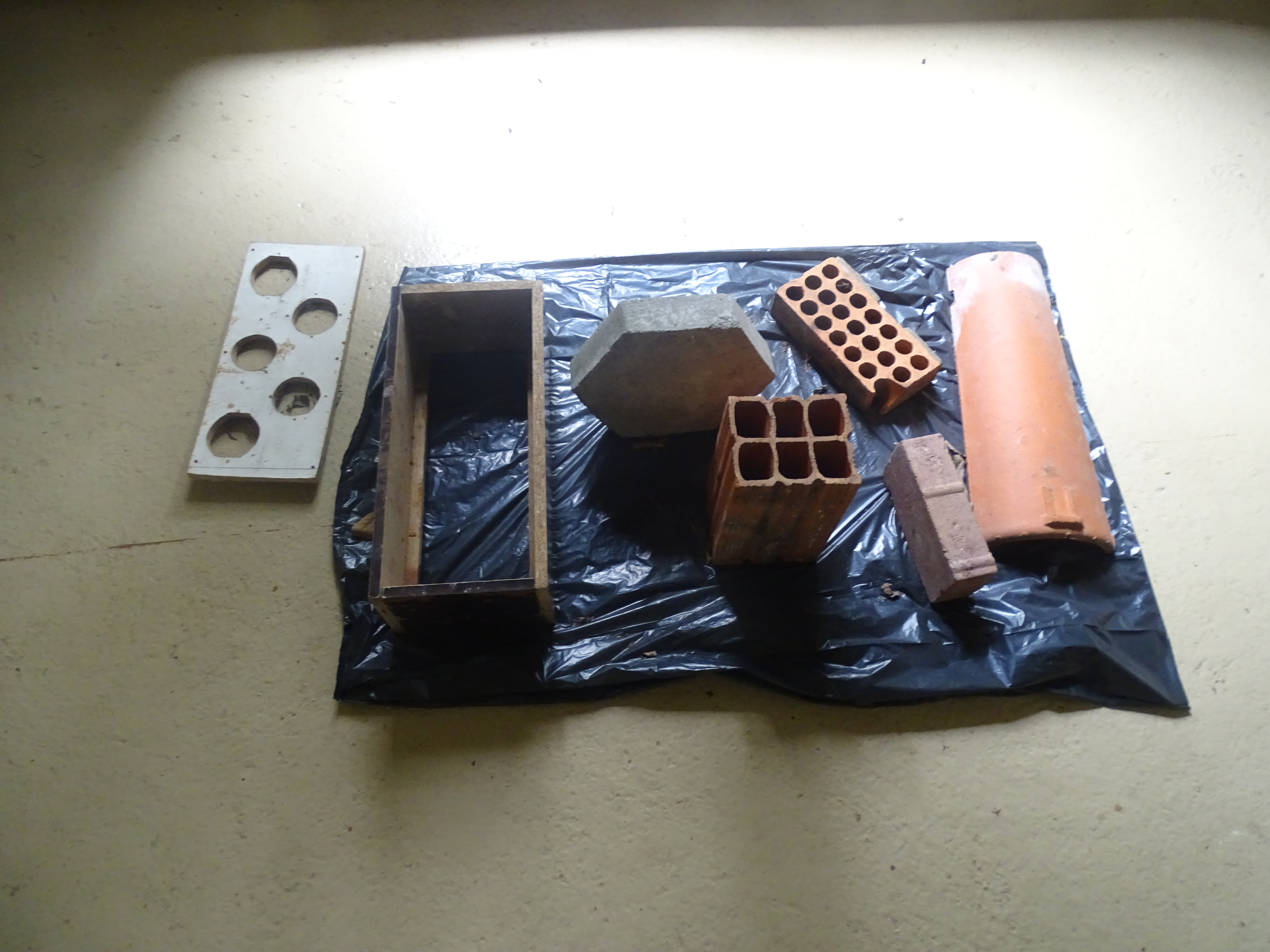
Materials used for the house construction.

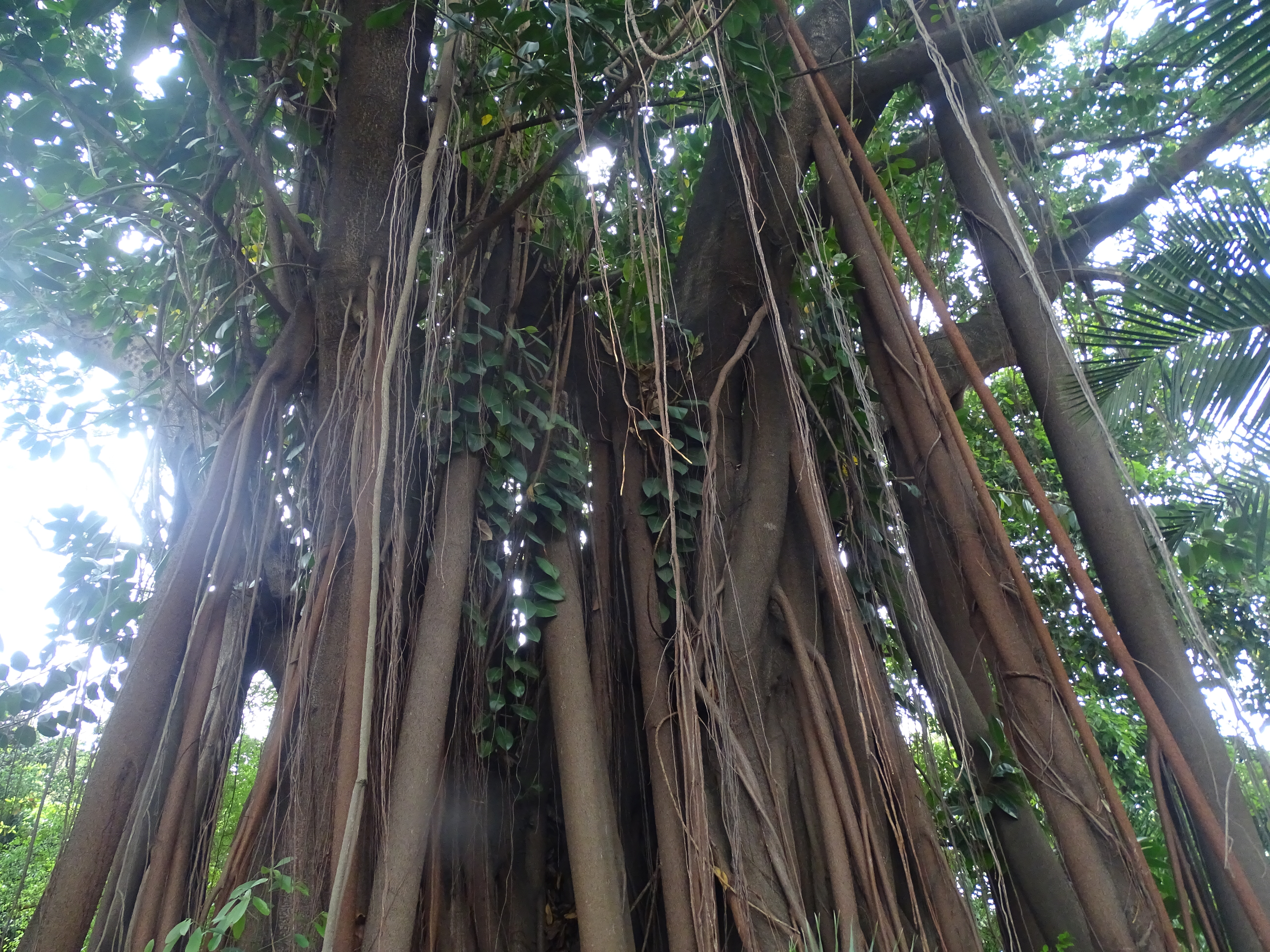
One of the largest trees in the city at the Bandeirante's House.

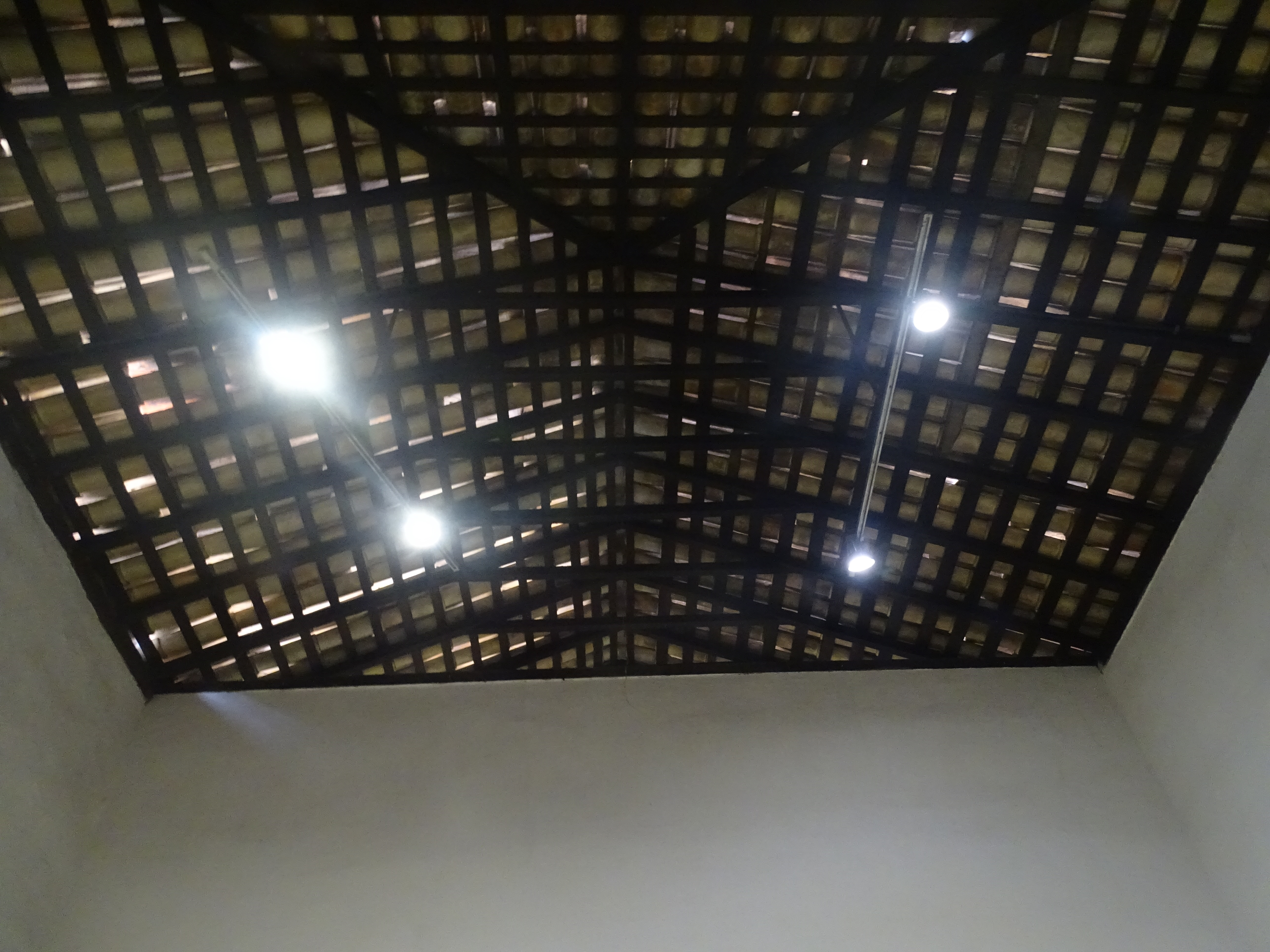
Ceiling of the Bandeirante's House.

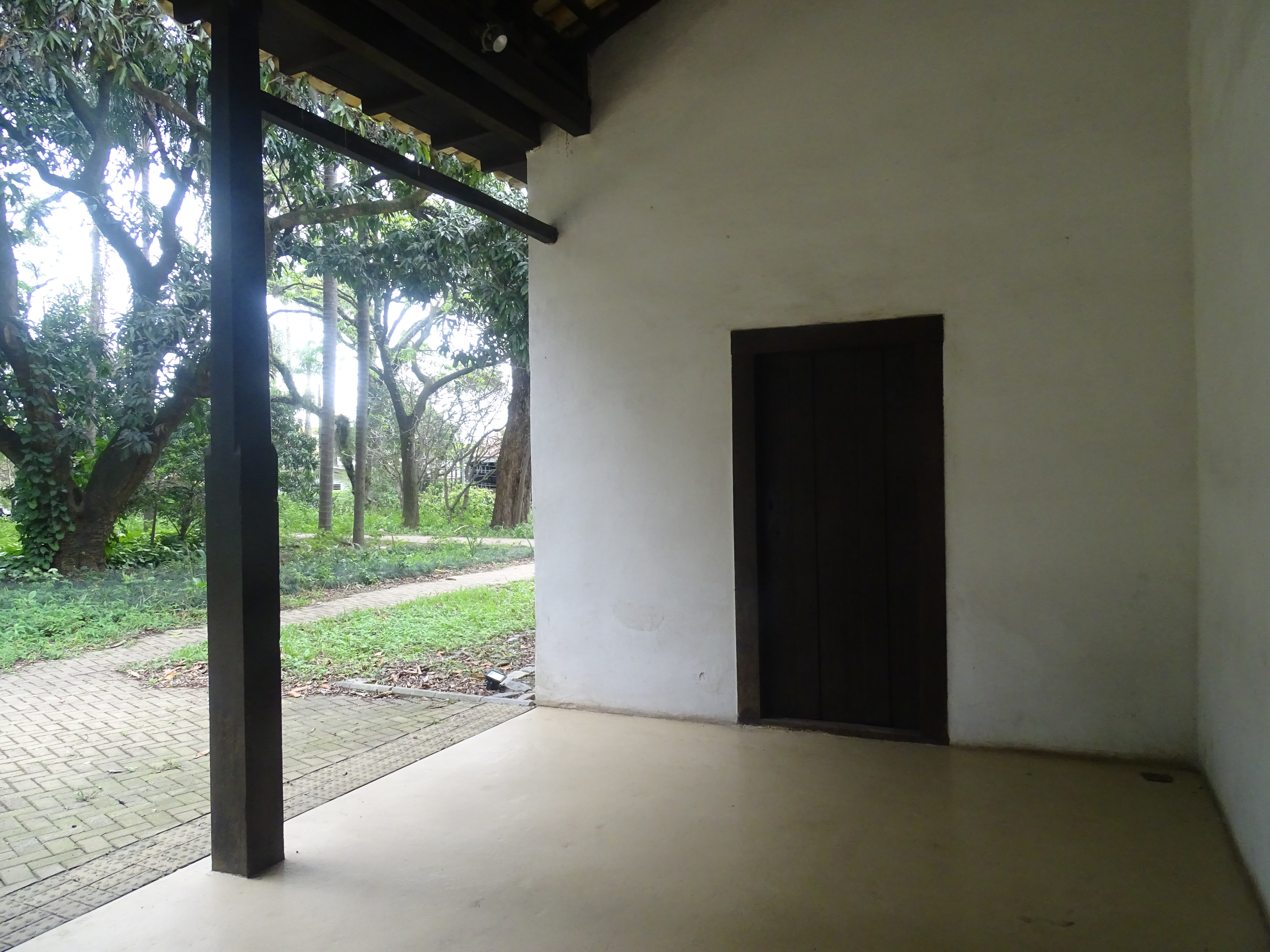
Exterior and kitchen of the Bandeirante's House.

== See also ==
- Colonial architecture of Brazil
- Mannerism in Brazil
- Casa do Sítio Tatuapé
- Sítio Morrinhos

== Bibliography ==
- Saia, Luiz (1972). A Morada Paulista (in Portuguese). São Paulo: Perspectiva. ISBN 978-85-273-0605-8.
