= Casa do Sítio Tatuapé =

17th-century listed building in São Paulo, Brazil

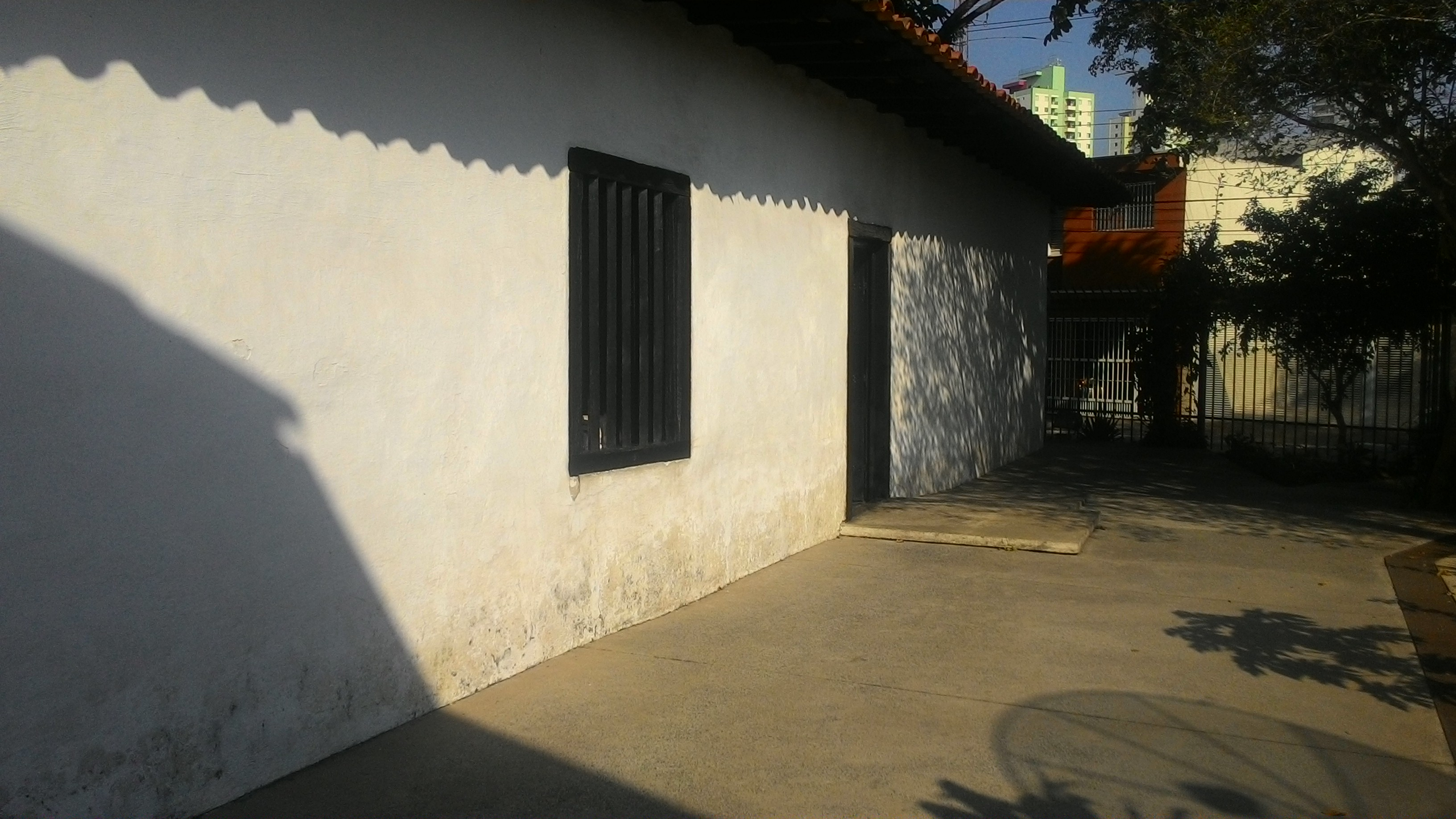
- Today the house is used as a museum and is a heritage site.
- Interactive map of the Casa do Sítio Tatuapé area

General information
- Architectural style: Bandeirista
- Location: São Paulo
- Coordinates: 23°32′0″S 46°34′56″W
- Completed: Estimated between 1668 and 1698

Design and construction
- Architect: Mathias Rodrigues da Silva
- Awards and prizes: Heritage site listed by IPHAN (1957) CONDEPHAAT (1975)

Casa do Sítio do Tatuapé ("House of the Tatuapé" in English) is a characteristic construction of the bandeirista cycle, from the 17th century, located in the Tatuapé district, at 49 Guabijú street, in São Paulo, Brazil. Built in 1668 and 1698 by Mathias Rodrigues da Silva, it was erected using the rammed earth technique and contains six rooms and two attics, which distinguishes it from other examples from the colonial period by having a gable roof (inclined planes for water drainage). It is the oldest bandeirista house in the city of São Paulo, and one of the few from its period still preserved in the city. Its listing is dated October 22, 1951, process number 353-T, inscription number 291 in the IPHAN (Institute of National Historical and Artistic Heritage) Historical Book.

== History ==
It is estimated that the house was built between 1668 and 1698, by Mathias Rodrigues da Silva, administrator of the lands of Father Matheus Nunes de Siqueira, who owned land in the region. The description of this property appeared for the first time in the inventory of Catharina d'Orta, the administrator's wife. The house functioned as a dwelling for 150 years, sheltering muleteers who traveled the country. It later served as a pottery producing exclusively tiles, and then bricks after the arrival of the Italians. Its establishment was near a watercourse, and only then the house would become a pottery.

The Casa do Sítio de Tatuapé was built in the center of a farm that already had a cattle corral and a small church ("ermida"). Some historians say that this property also belonged to João Ramalho, although they have never been able to prove it. It is also pointed out that the construction was used for the insertion of a dyehouse.

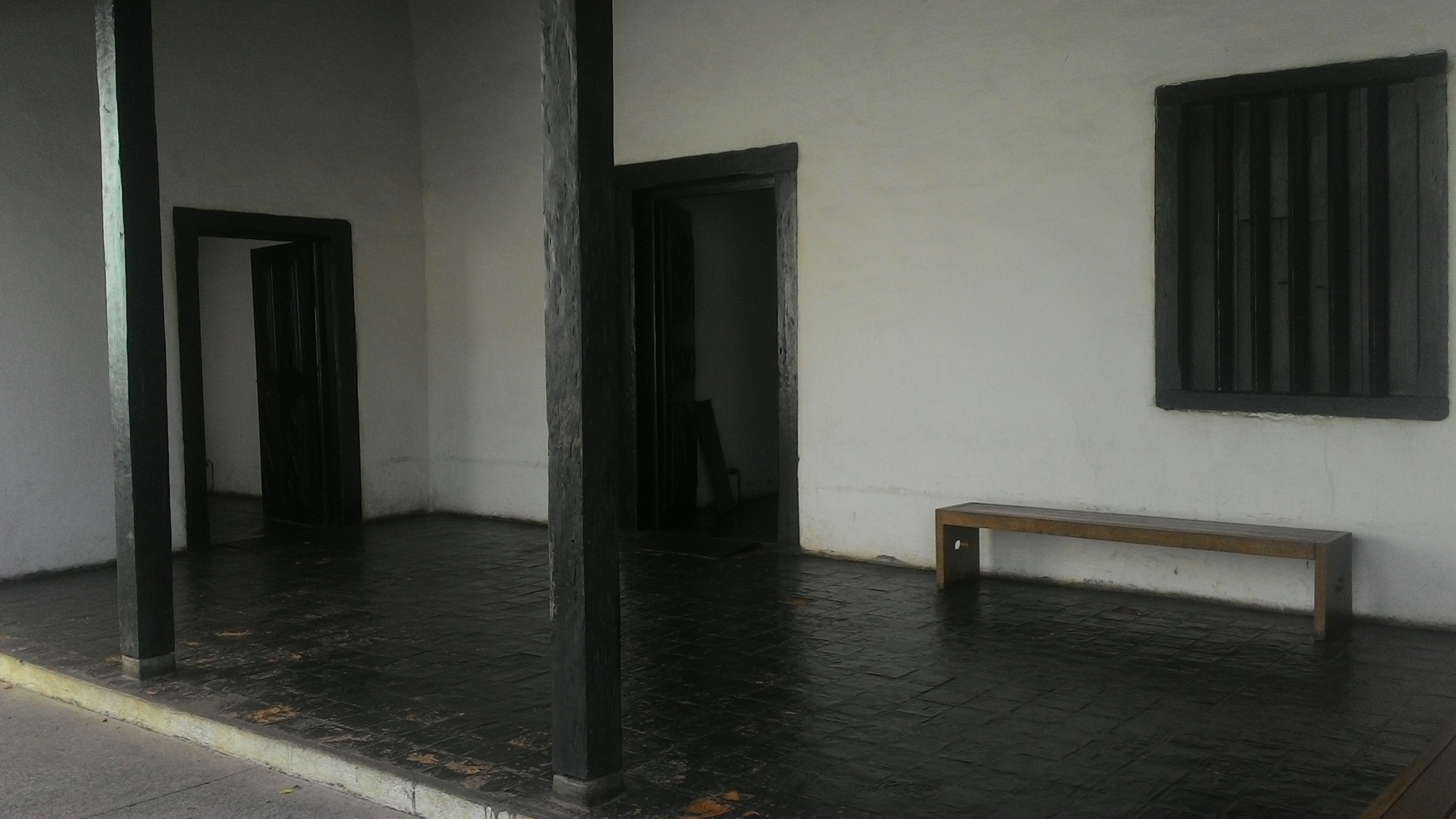
External area of the house

Its last owner was Elias Quartim de Albuquerque, who resided there from 1877 until 1943 when he died without leaving descendants or a will. In May 1944, by charter, permission was granted to sell the property where the house is located to Faustina Quartim de Albuquerque Pacini, Elias' sister. Through a deed drawn up in April 1945, the house was then sold and acquired by the Textillia weaving mill. With the subdivision of the property, the house still remained there until the land was expropriated by the city government in 1979. Earlier, in 1950, the company proposed the donation of land to the city government to subdivide the area, but the donation never took place. Case No. 172.842 and 1965, in the name of Textillia weaving mill, still reveals the existence of other residents in the house.

"There are residents in the house. Mr. Nicola Marcílio, who is now 68 years old, lives there. According to his wife, he was born there and has always lived there, and his parents were employees of the Quartim family, descendants of the Barons Silva Gameiro. Other families live there, in rooms rented by Mr. Nicola Marcilio. This citizen, on the advice of others, has paid and keeps the receipts in his possession, the taxes and fees charged by the City, to Tecelagem Textillia S. A."

As of Decree No. 14,817 of December 16, 1977, the house was declared of public utility by the Municipality of São Paulo. Between 1979 and 1980, under the responsibility of the Department of Historical Heritage (DPH), together with the Paulista Museum of USP, archaeological research was carried out and subsequently the property underwent restoration work.

The renovation allowed for the reconstruction of unstable parts of the structure and the same process of rammed earth was used as in the original work. The woodwork and the roof were also redone. Other aspects such as windows and doors were restored and, thanks to an archaeological intervention in the house to highlight characteristics of the period, the dirt floor was preserved in the rooms.

It was opened to the public in 1981, in 1991 underwent conservation work, and reopened in 1992. Its mud walls are up to 60 cm thick. It has a rectangular plan and a gable roof, and its size is 919 m^{2}.

It has been part of the Historical Heritage of the city of São Paulo since it was listed by IPHAN.

== Architecture ==
Its rectangular plan is 16.50 x 13.55 meters, with three rows of rooms and only one reentrant alprendre ("corridor") facing the east. It has a characteristic gable roof formed by hinged rafters supported directly on the ridge and groundsill beams. The joints, at three points, cancel lateral thrusts on the walls, which causes only normal forces to be transmitted.

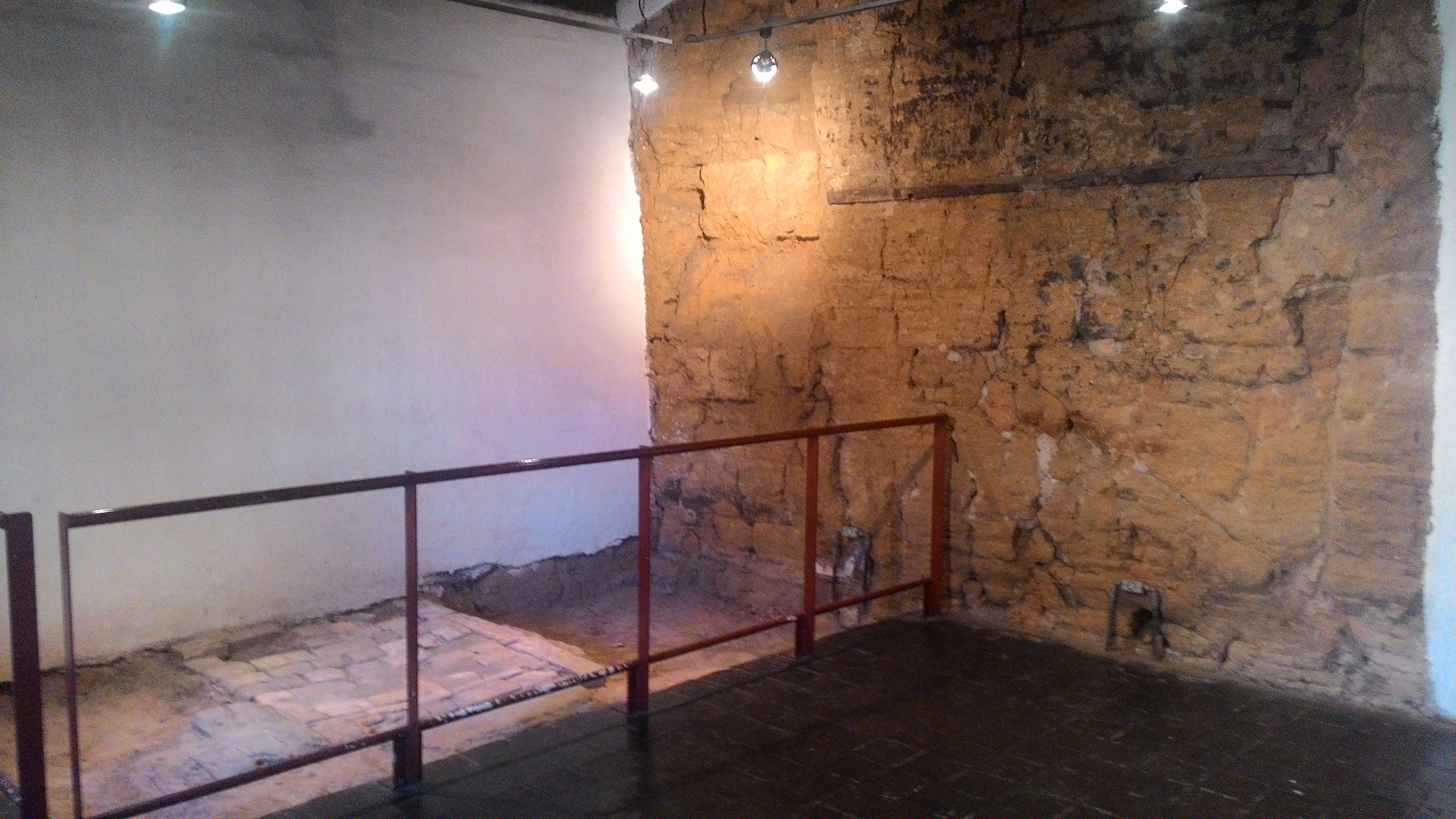
Rammed earth wall

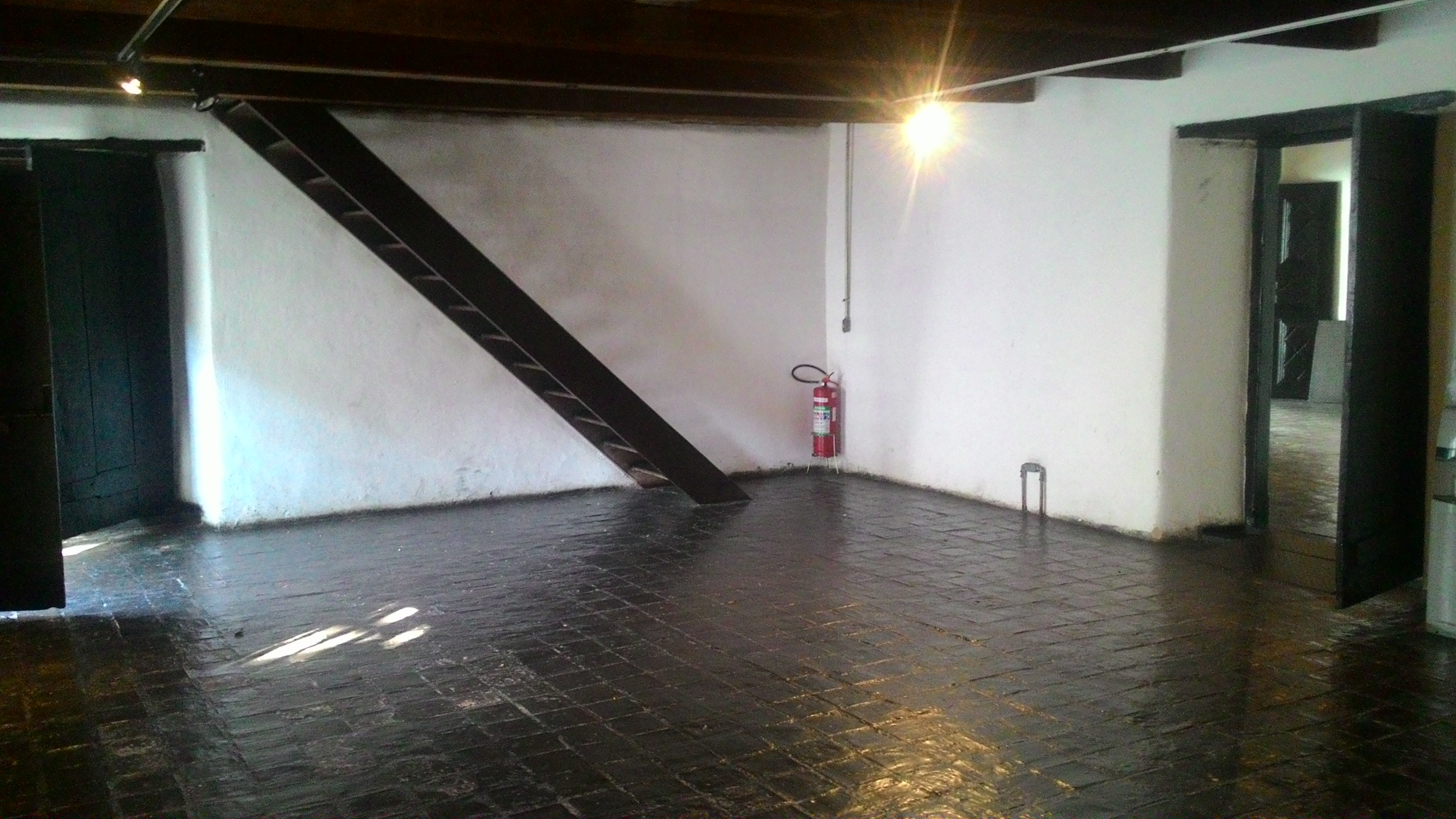
Canela-preta wood floor and doors

The walls were built using the technique of rammed earth, with a thick and massive appearance. Inside, a central door was structured, with a porch, flanked by two front rooms, in addition to the guest rooms and the chapel, also called the hermitage, which no longer exists. It also opens to a main hall, through which one has access to other rooms or alcoves, and it also has two attics that differ from other examples of the colonial period in that they have only a gable roof. The main hall is a gathering area for the family itself and also for the slaves.

An original and predominant aspect in the doors and windows of the building is still the wood of the black canela-preta tree, forming jambs, stoops, lintels, copings, and beams in the structure, as well as in the woodwork of the floor (floor and rafters).

The Casa do Tatuapé is one of twelve architectural examples that served as the basis for an analysis that theorizes the apogee and decadence of bandeirista architecture.

== Historical and Cultural Significance ==
The Casa do Tatuapé belongs to a series of bandeirista houses located around the Vila de São Paulo de Piratininga that were listed by IPHAN, for constituting the first expression of residential architecture in Brazil, with an emphasis on portraying a massive, functional, and purist artistic aspect.

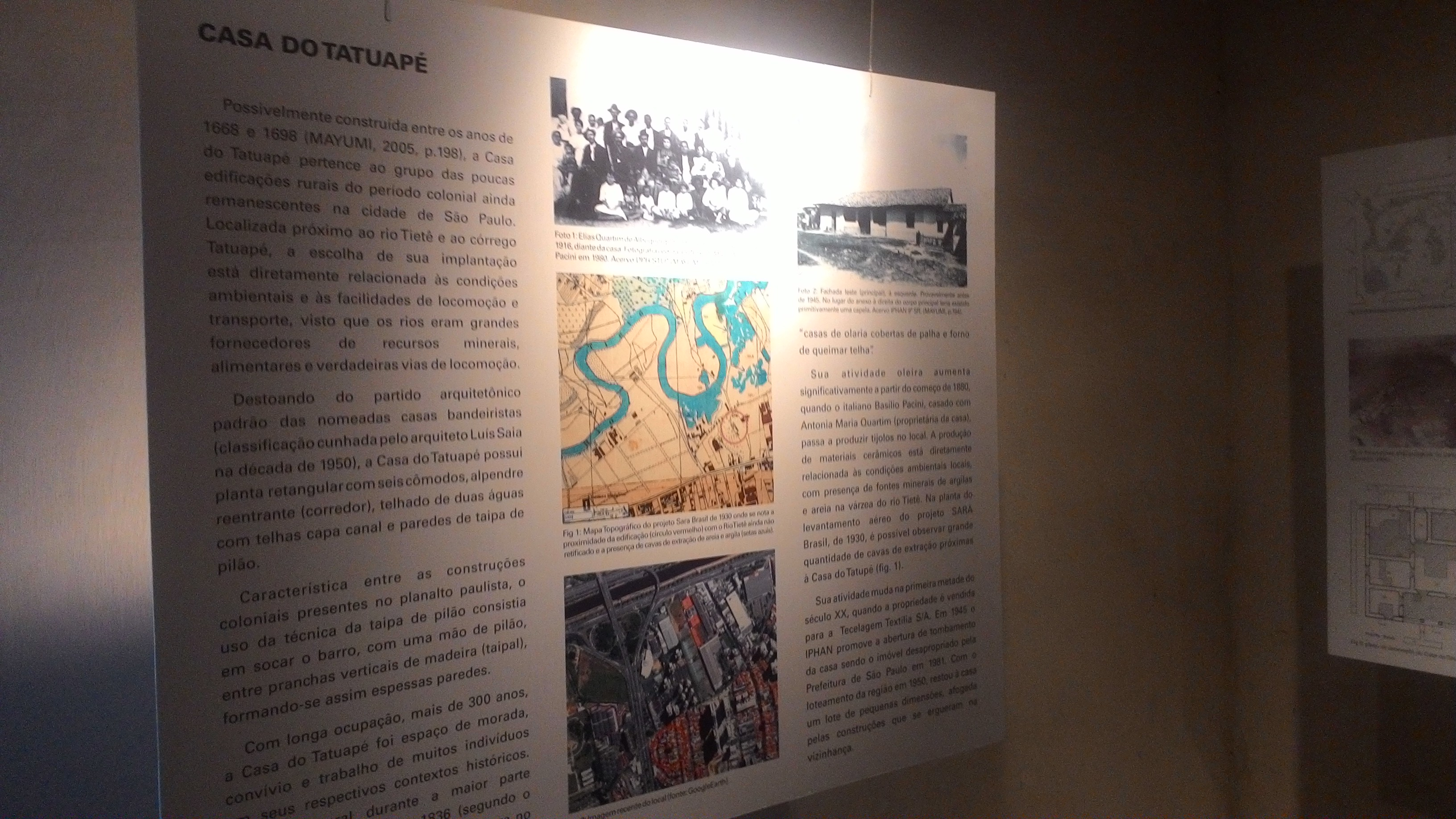
Panel containing historical information

Three decades after it was bought by Tecelagem Textilia, the Tatuapé House was acquired by the City Hall of the Municipality of São Paulo between 1979 and 1980, under the responsibility of the Department of Historical Heritage (DPH), through a project carried out with the Paulista Museum of USP.

Archaeological research was conducted, and another aspect of great historical relevance attributed to the Tatuapé House is the objects that were found in it during such work. Currently, these utensils are displayed in one of the rooms and can be observed. The room that houses them has no wall covering, which makes it possible to see the layers of rammed earth that form the thick walls of the house.

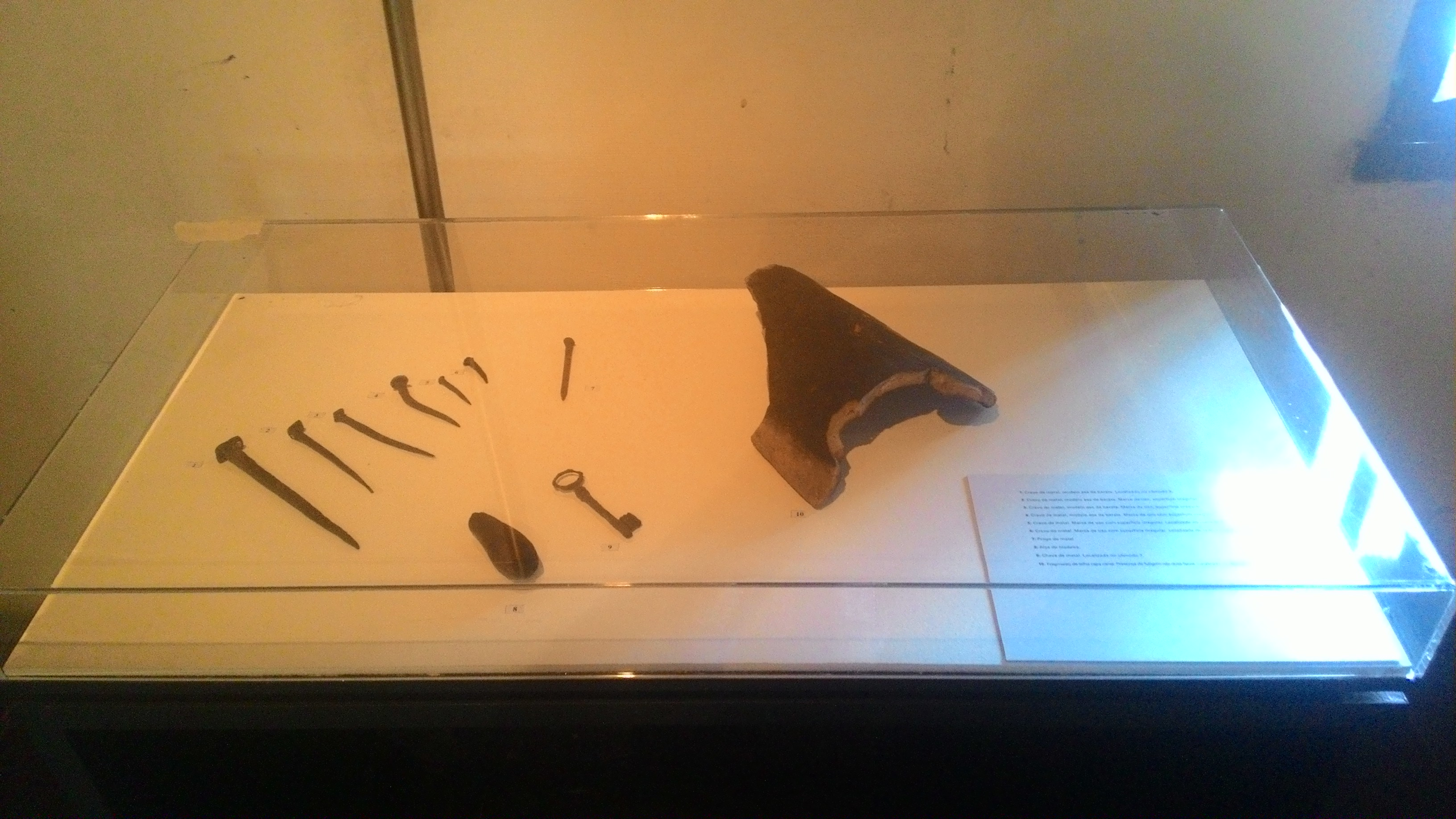
Exhibition of historical house utensils

In other rooms, objects that are part of a collection of thousands of pieces found in prospecting sites in the city of São Paulo are displayed. They are everyday objects that seek to rescue images of how the domestic habits of the locals were - as, for example, in the kitchens, with their iron, wood, or copper utensils.

The Casa do Tatuapé still gathers, as well as other constructions of bandeirista origin scattered around the city, furniture pieces, kitchen utensils, tools, household ornaments, religious images, and other objects, all of these components that were part of the furniture of rural mud buildings remaining from the 17th, 18th and 19th centuries.

== Current state ==
The restoration work carried out to revitalize the already worn-out original structure of the building, which had, among other problems, loose and unstable walls due to its large dimensions and poor conservation, had its project developed so that the original form of the monument would not be lost. During the construction, however, specific methods were used. Soil-cement and concreting were abandoned in favor of the reinforced mortar technique.

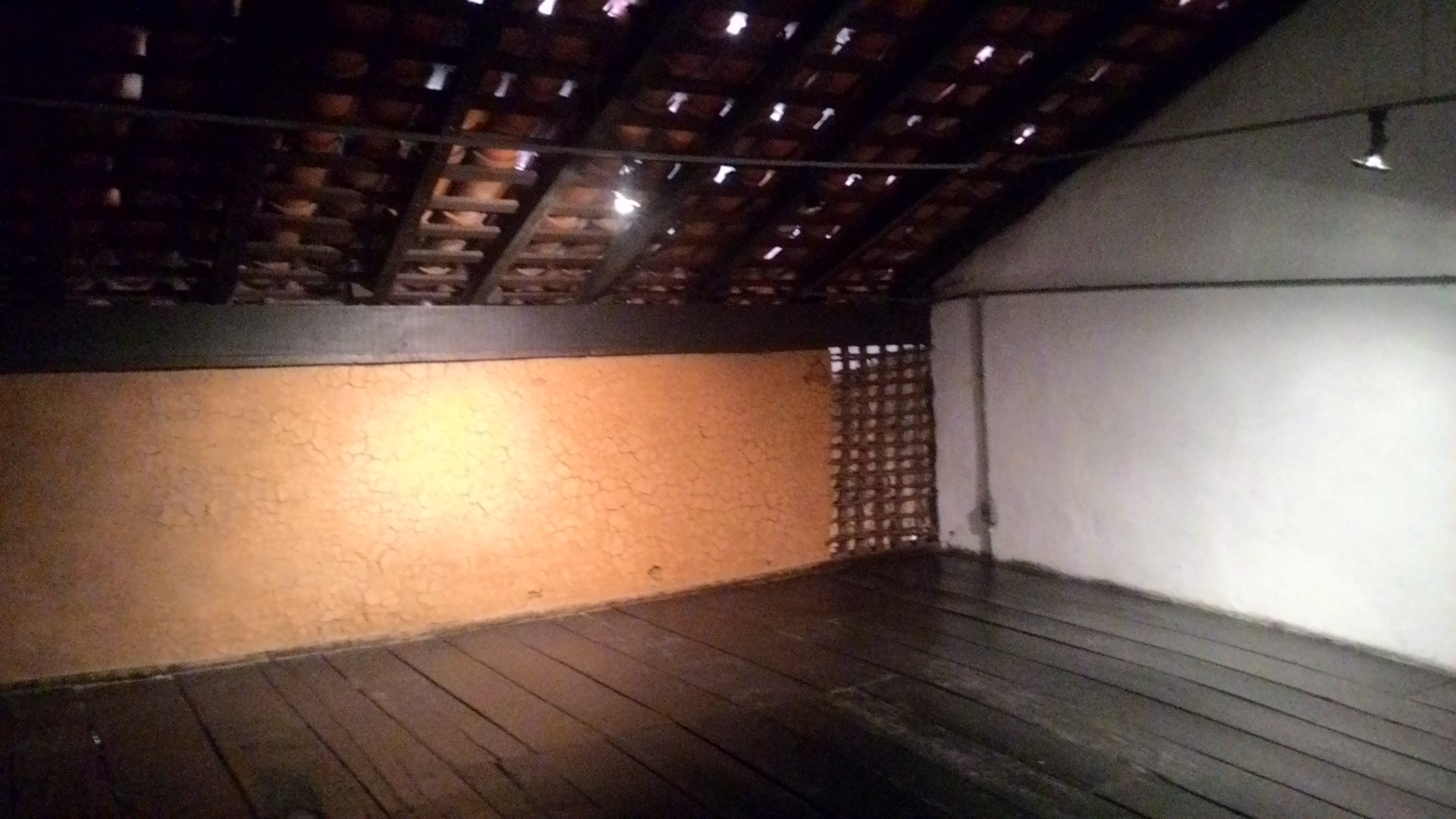
Second floor architecture

The guidelines adopted for the work, based on the observation that the house had not suffered alterations in its original volumetry, in addition to the possibility of recovering the original feature of the monument, directed the recovery of the original physiognomy of the building, eliminating the new elements introduced in the planning and complementing elements that had already been altered. Restoration, in general, took preference over the replacement of materials.

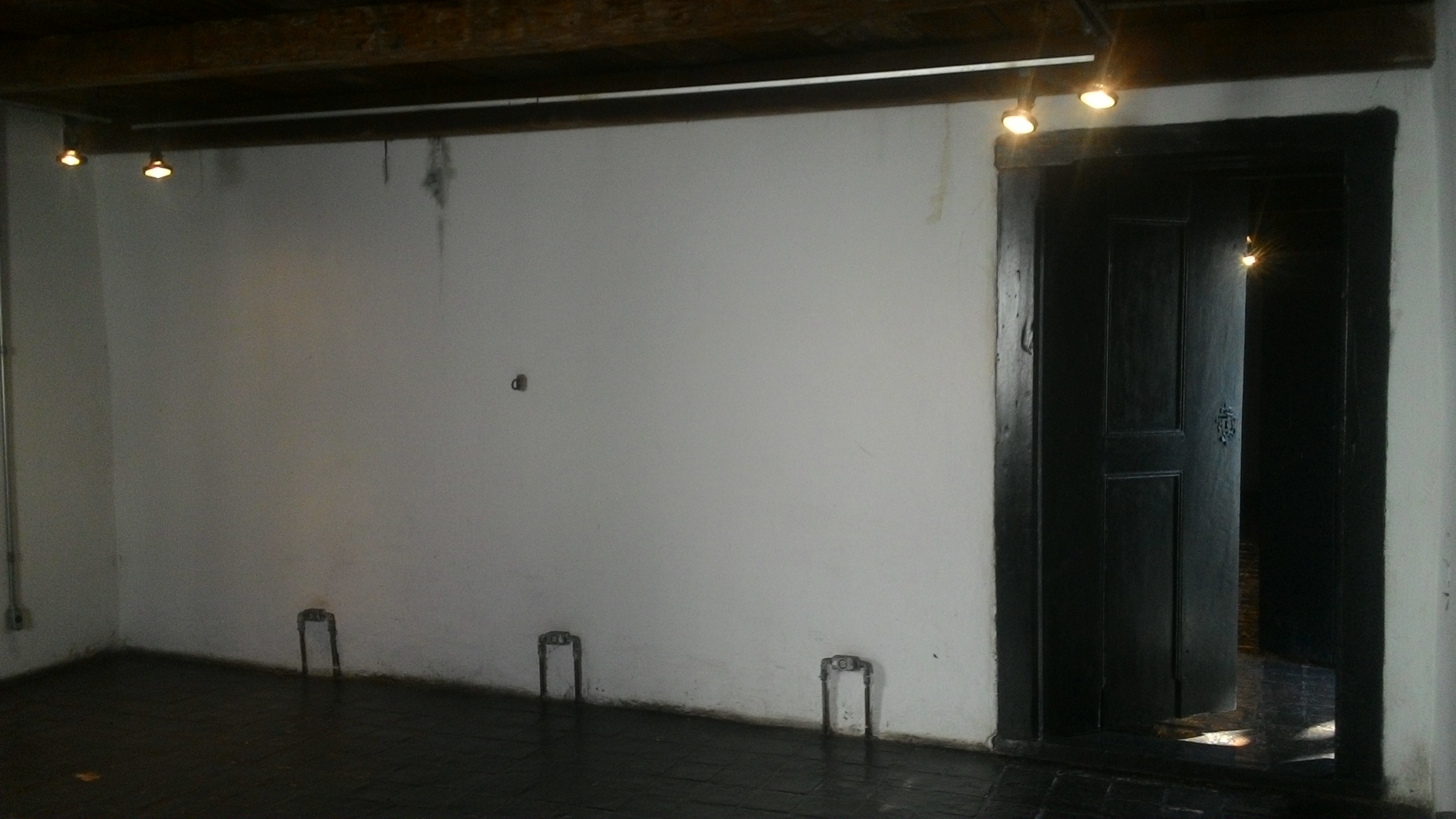
Internal appearance after restoration

During the work, some of the criteria originally proposed were altered, as found by the analysis of restorations through documents and photos of the work, which allowed the procedures adopted and the solutions implemented to be known. The recomposed parts of the monument, which should have been evident, are not distinguishable from the original parts of its construction.

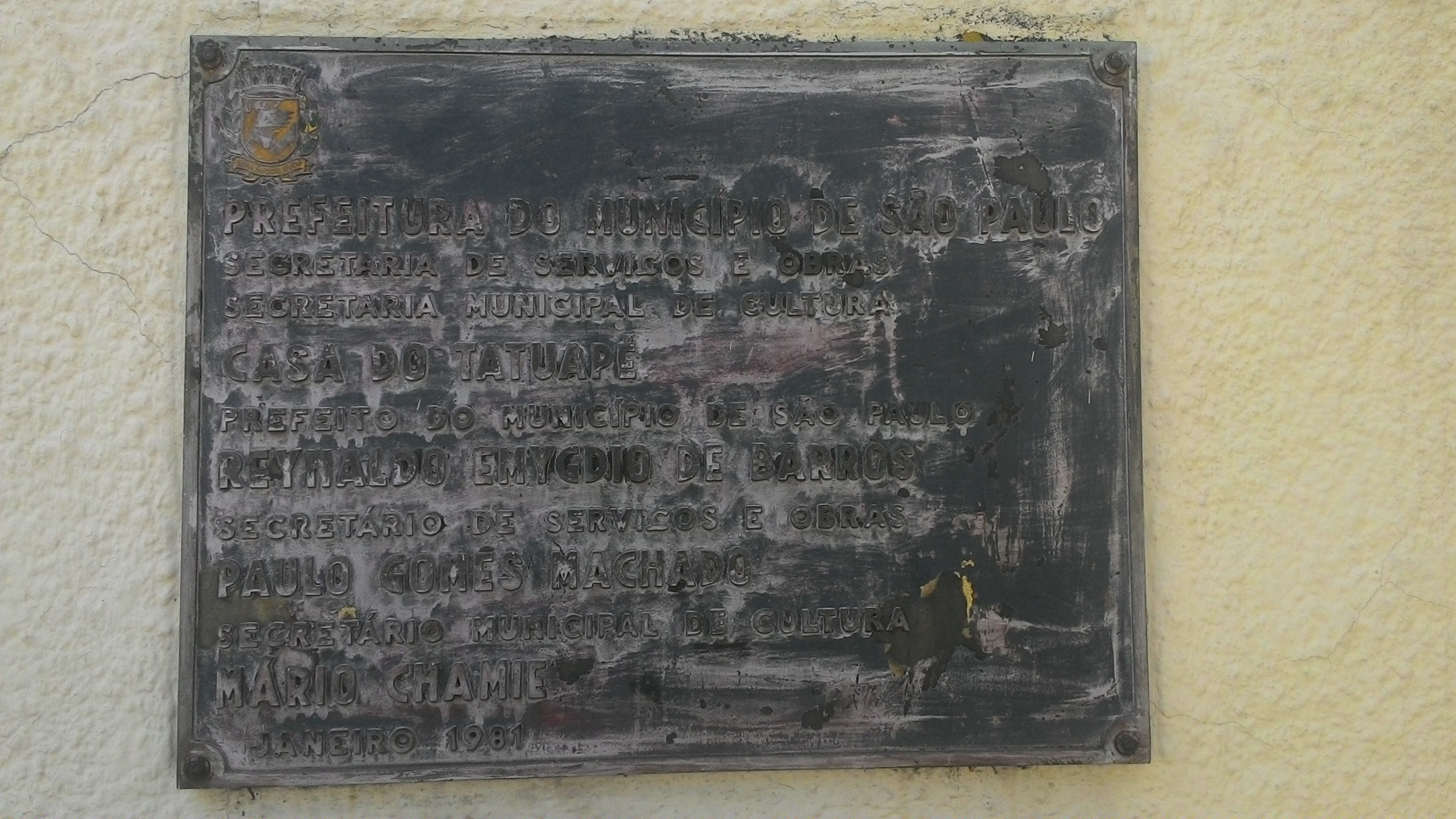
City Hall Plaque

Once the operations for external consolidation of the monument were completed, conservation and restoration were also carried out on the elements on the inside. Among the characteristics of this system was the inclusion of reinforced mortar at the crumbling points of the walls, culminating at the end of the revitalization. Nowadays, the space hosts exhibitions, socio-cultural activities, and monitored visits.

== See also ==
- Butantã's House
- Sítio Morrinhos
- Tatuapé
