= Historic Center of São Paulo =

Historic sector in São Paulo, Brazil

Historic Center of São Paulo Centro Histórico de São Paulo
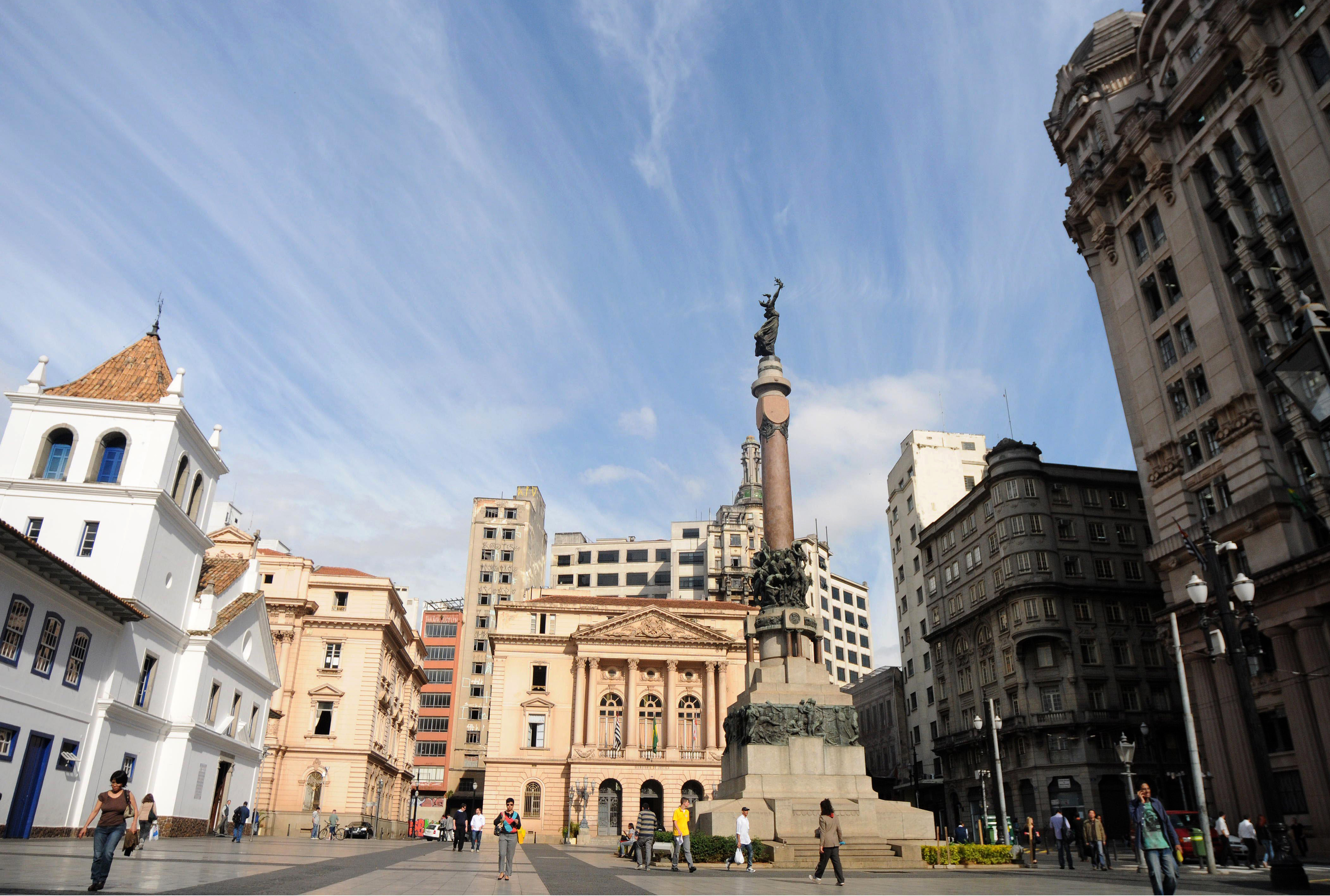
- Pátio do Colégio, with the Museu Anchieta (on the left) and the buildings of the Department of Justice and Defense of Citizenship and the Court of Justice (on the right).
- Interactive map of Historic Center of São Paulo
- Coordinates: 23°32′32.06″S 46°37′57.3″W
- Foundation: January 25th, 1554
- Boroughs: Sé District; República District

Area
  - Total: 4.4 km^{2} (1.7 sq mi)

Population
  - Total: 64.366

The Historic Center of São Paulo (Portuguese: Centro Histórico de São Paulo), also known as Centro, is a neighborhood in the Central Zone of the municipality of São Paulo, Brazil. It corresponds to the area where the city was founded on January 25, 1554, by the Jesuit priests António Vieira, Joseph of Anchieta and Manuel da Nobrega. It is composed of the Sé and República districts and features most of the buildings that portray the city's history, such as the Pátio do Colégio, the location of its establishment. The Historic Center is extremely rich in historical monuments dating from the 16th through the 20th centuries.

The area is home to several cultural centers, bars, restaurants, museums, most of the city's tourist attractions and municipal and state government offices. The State Secretariat for Sport and Tourism promotes walking tours of the area, allowing locals and visitors to see the most diverse buildings, such as: the São Paulo Bank, a construction currently used by the São Paulo State Department of Tourism; the B3 headquarters, where visitors can watch transactions on a big screen; the St Benedict's Monastery, where masses are held at 10 a.m. on Sundays; the Martinelli Building, the first skyscraper in South America; the Banco do Brasil Cultural Center, which has exhibition halls, a cinema, a theater, a restaurant, an auditorium and bookstores; the Municipal Theater of São Paulo, with free concerts on Wednesdays; and the Sé Cathedral.

== Definition ==
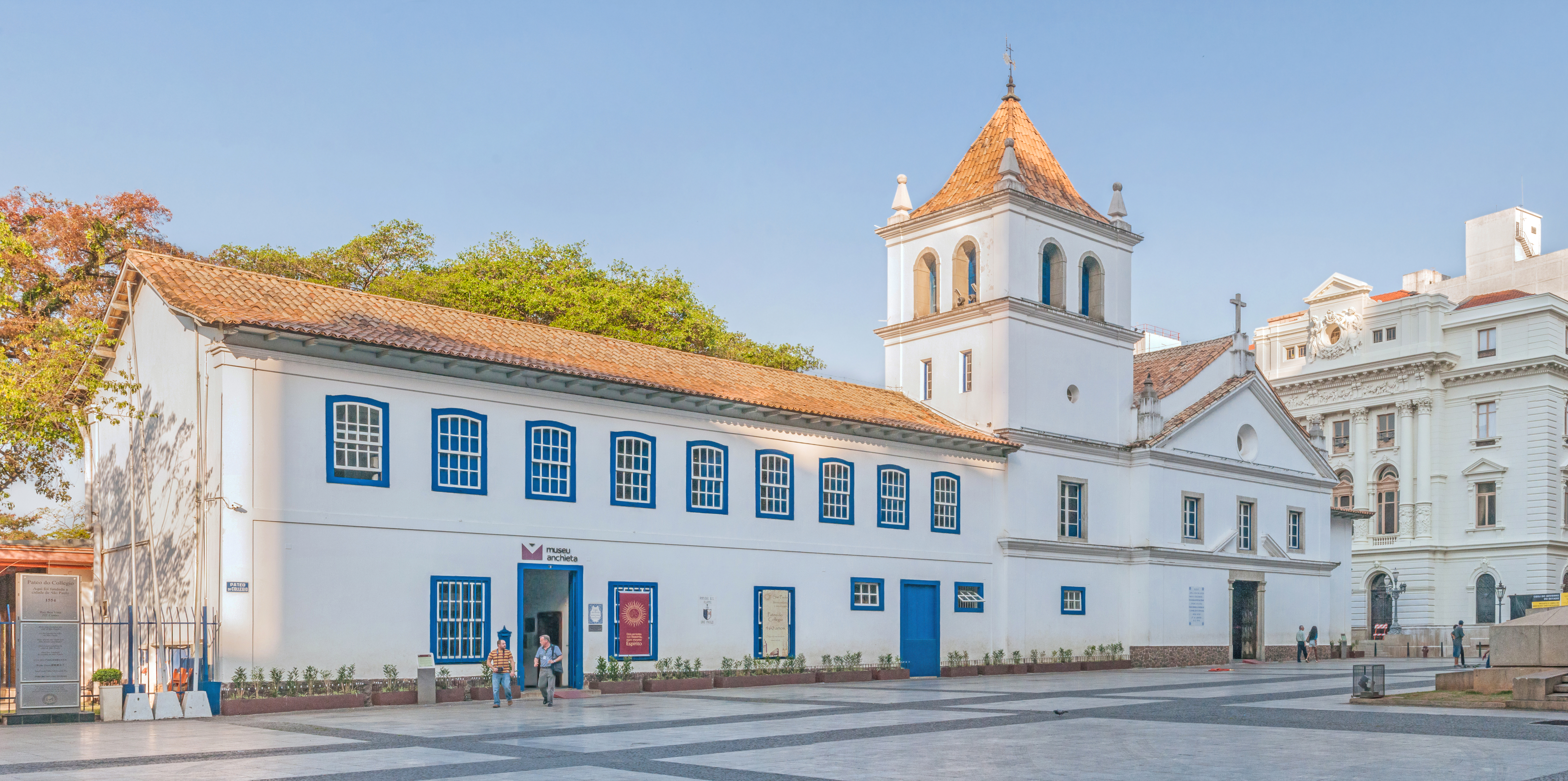
Pátio do Colégio.

Although it is common to consider the Sé and República districts as the historic center of São Paulo, the title truly belongs to the Sé district, more specifically to the area between Largo de São Francisco, Largo São Bento and Sé Square, which form the "historical triangle" where a Jesuit college was built and from which the settlement, and later the town of São Paulo de Piratininga, originated.

The portion of the city center included in the definition of "historic center" was occupied later and today corresponds to the República district, located at the end of the Santa Ifigênia Viaduct and the Viaduto do Chá. Although this region concentrates a considerable number of São Paulo's historic landmarks, such as the Municipal Theatre, Ladeira da Memória, the Mário de Andrade Library and Republic Square, it is officially called the Centro Novo (English: New Center).

== History ==
=== 20th century ===
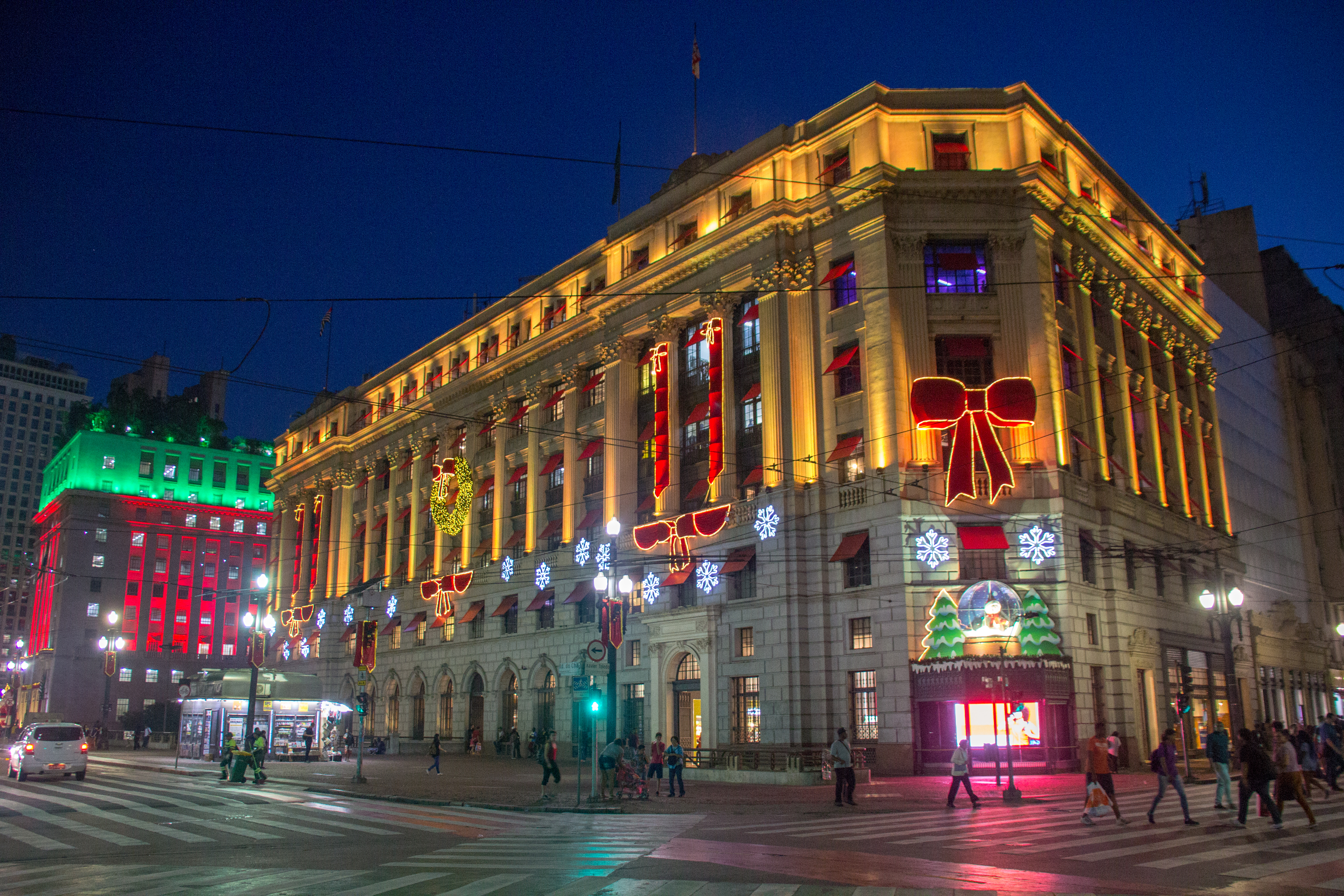
Alexandre Mackenzie Building (Light Building) with the Matarazzo Building in the background.

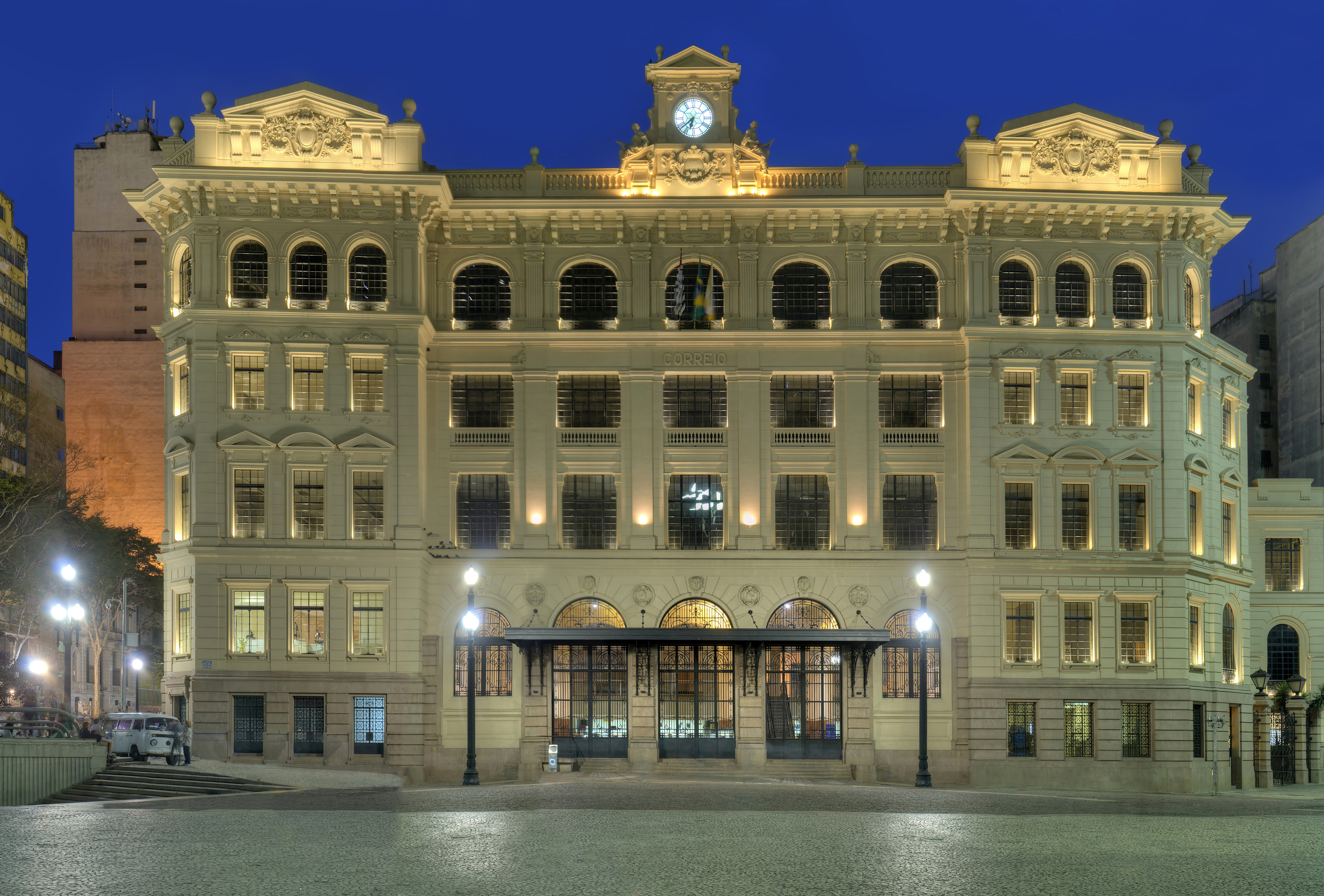
Post Office Palace, in the Anhangabaú Valley.

During the Revolution of 1924, the area was bombed by federal government planes. The legalist army under Artur Bernardes used the so-called "terrifying bombardment", hitting several points in the city, especially working-class neighborhoods such as Mooca, Ipiranga, Brás, Belenzinho and Centro.

Over the course of the 20th century, the historic center of São Paulo reached its economic and social apogee, as well as its maximum degradation. At the same time, the city's economic centrality migrated in a south-westerly direction with the emergence of the Paulista Avenue business center and, later, Brigadeiro Faria Lima Avenue. More recently, the creation of a large commercial pole extending through the Vila Olímpia area and the Engenheiro Luis Carlos Berrini and Chucri Zaidan avenues, in the vicinity of Nações Unidas Avenue (Marginal Pinheiros), has intensified this process.

Until the 1970s, the historic center of São Paulo, already with a consolidated infrastructure and filled with large corporations and skyscrapers, still concentrated a significant part of the large national and foreign companies based in the city. In its narrow streets, where cars and pedestrians struggled to share the little space available, there was room for large department stores, household appliances, bookstores and restaurants of all kinds, with their facades full of advertisements that characterized the urban profile of the streets.

However, during this same period, the area was already experiencing the effects of severe urban decay, such as the transfer of the headquarters of many companies to other parts of the city, the heavy deterioration of the public space, the increase in crime rates, the process of real estate speculation in abandoned and unmaintained properties, the increase in the number of people living on the streets, the emergence of many tenements and the deterioration in the quality of life, which discouraged a large part of the population already established in the area from remaining there. This led to an emptying of the area's population, which would worsen continuously and acutely until the early 1990s, when, faced with a picture of profound and absolutely obvious degradation, the government began a process of urban requalification of the central part of the city.

Among the initial measures of the urban requalification policy in the central area of the city was the transfer of the City Hall headquarters, which until then had been located inside Ibirapuera Park, to the Palácio das Indústrias. Ten years later, it was moved back to the corner of Líbero Badaró Street and Viaduto do Chá, where it is today. The Largo São Bento and the Municipal Theatre were also renovated and remodeled, and the traffic lanes in the Anhangabaú Valley were filled in, where an exclusive area was set up for pedestrians to use as a square.

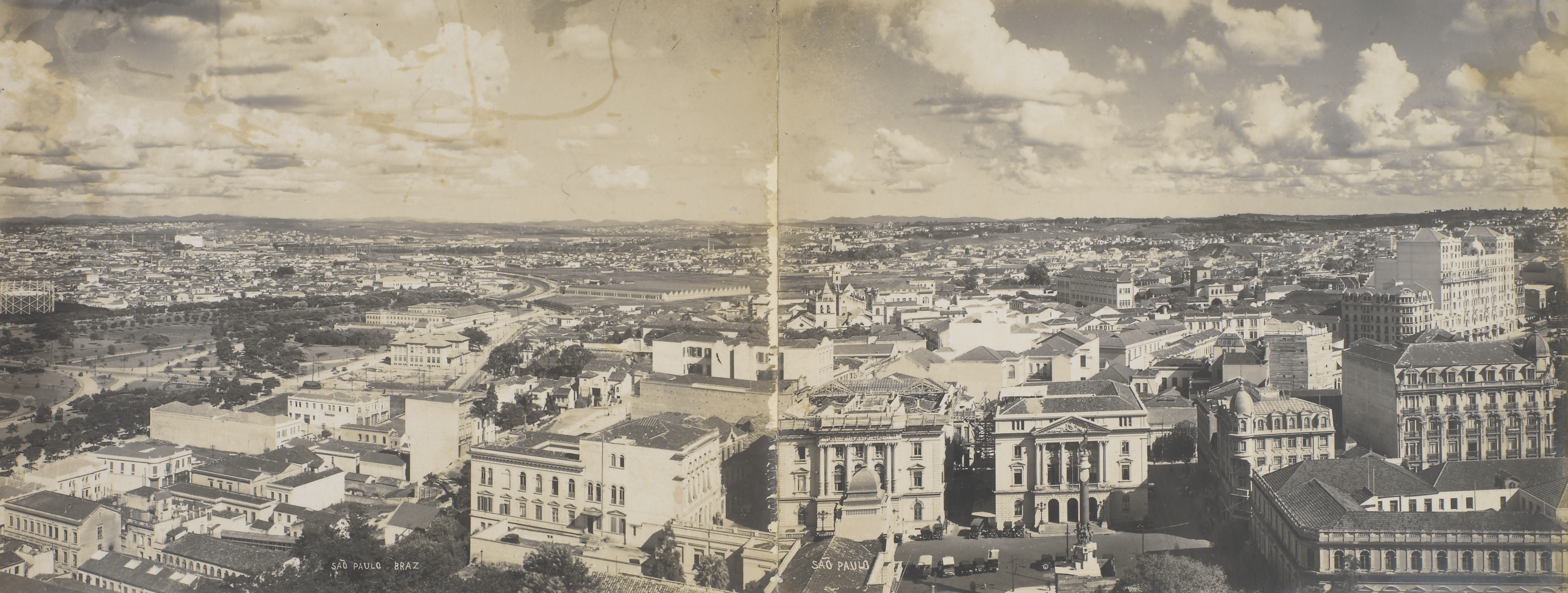
View of São Paulo city center in the 1920s. Collection of the National Archives.

== Economy ==
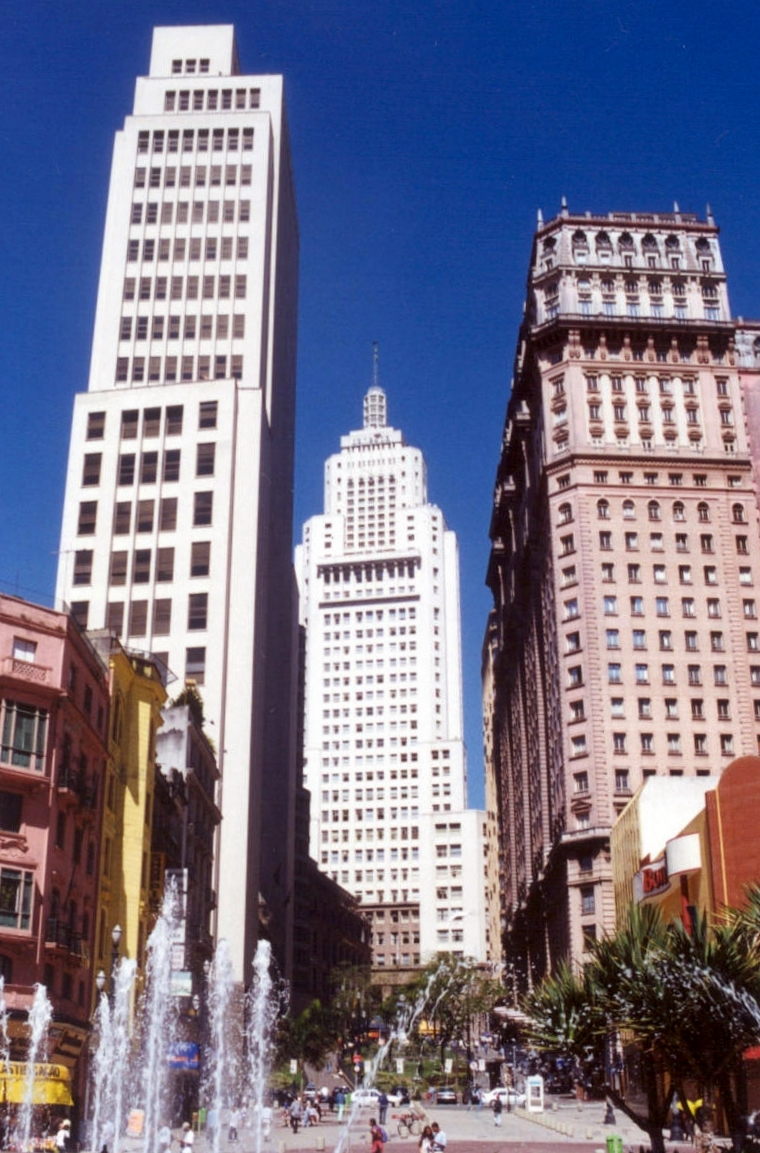
Vertical region of the city center. In the photo, the Banco do Brasil (left), Altino Arantes (center) and Martinelli (right) buildings stand out, the latter being the first skyscraper in Latin America.

Prestes Maia Avenue, part of a road complex built under the Anhangabaú Valley square.

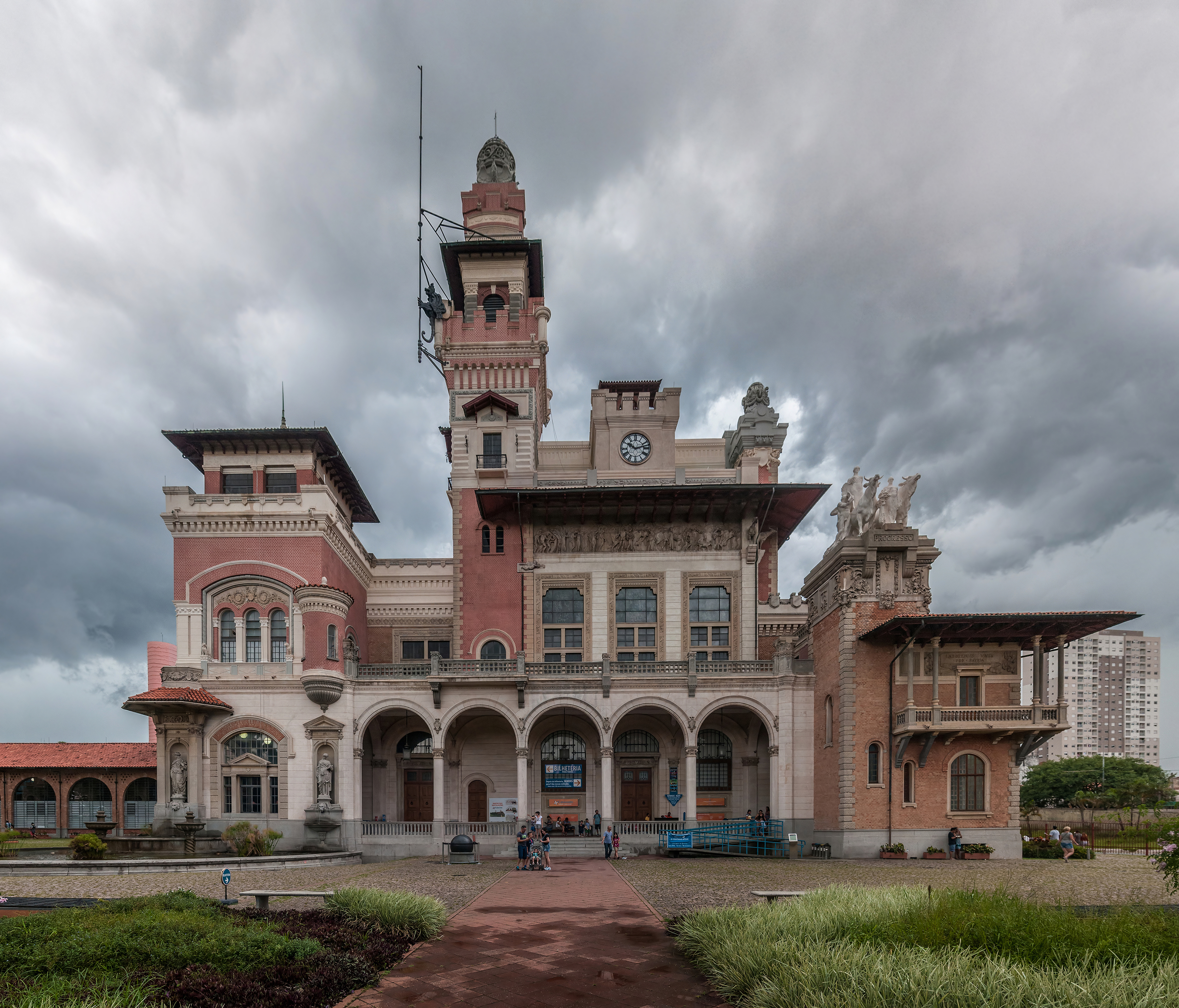
Palácio das Indústrias, now Catavento Museum, where São Paulo City Hall functioned between 1992 and 2002.

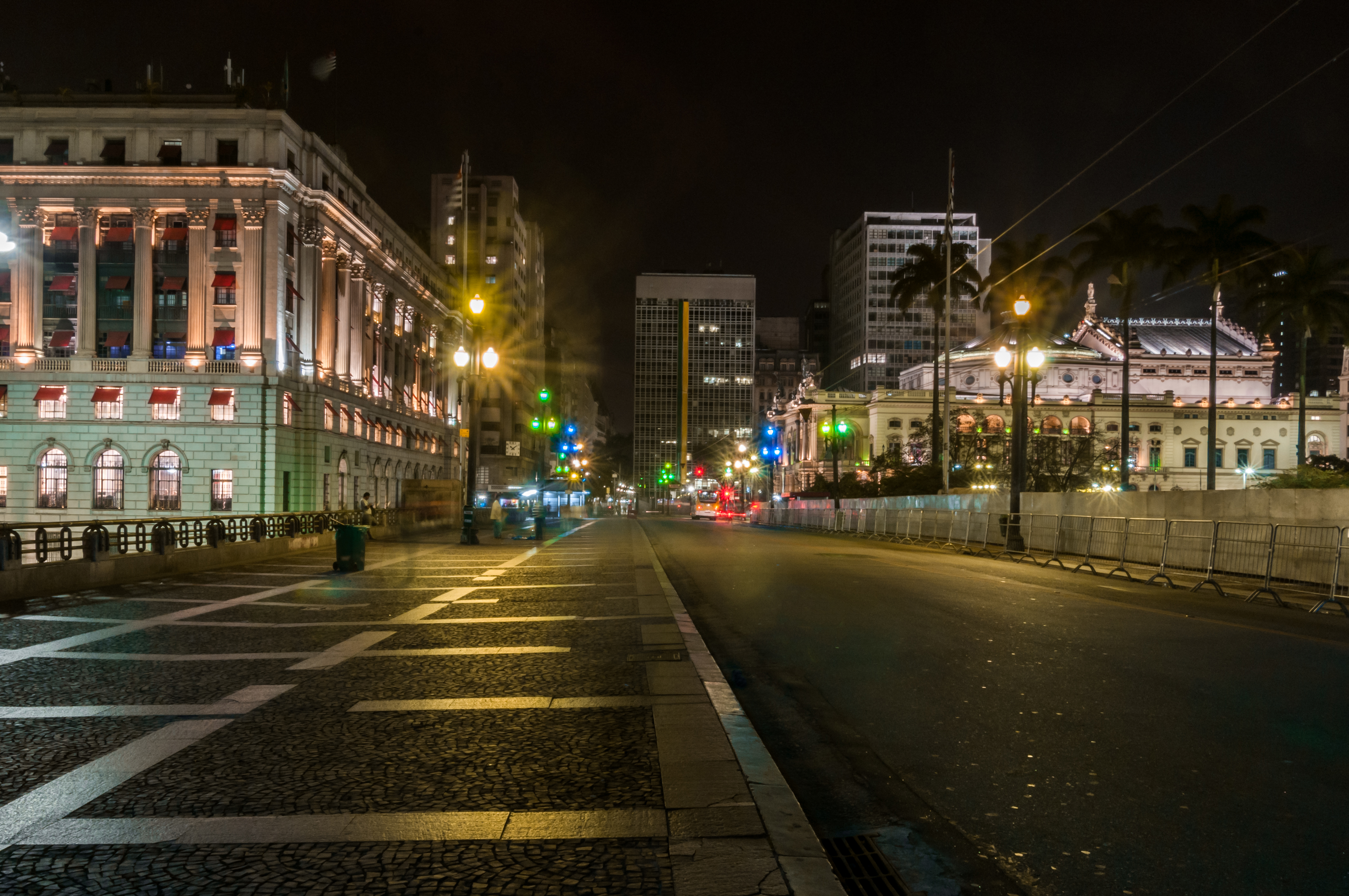
Viaduto do Chá at night, with the Municipal Theater (right).

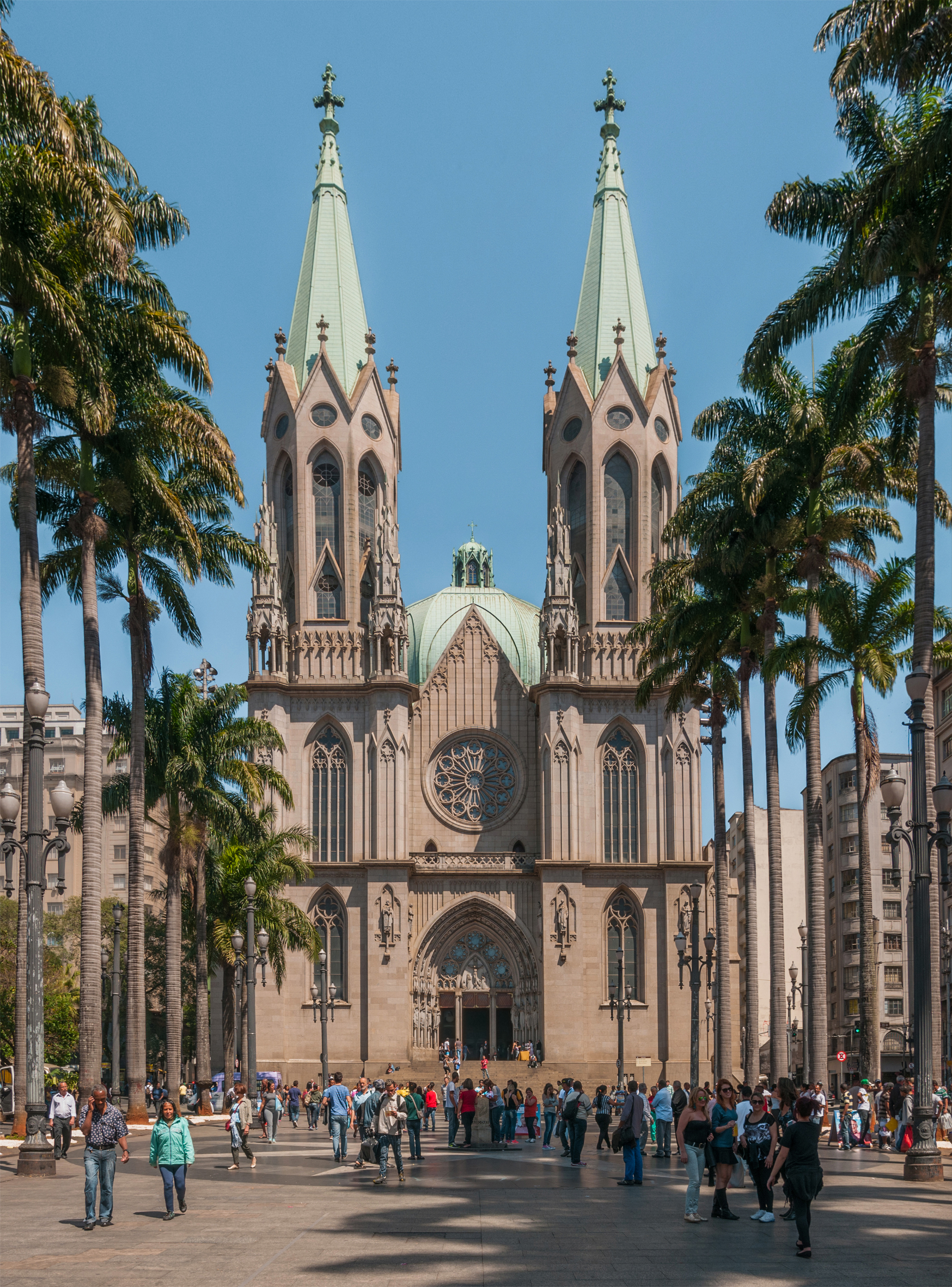
Metropolitan Cathedral of São Paulo.

For most of its history, the historic center of São Paulo was the financial hub and the largest commercial, banking and service center in the city. The region still preserves a vigorous street trade and a significant range of services, but the massive relocation of the headquarters of financial institutions, luxury retailers and restaurants is visible. However, the Stock Exchange is still based in the area today.

The existence of large skyscrapers that were once the national or regional headquarters of major Brazilian and foreign financial institutions shows the economic power that lived there. The main banks were Banespa, with its headquarters in the famous Altino Arantes Building, Banco Mercantil de São Paulo, which had its premises in the Mercantil Finasa Building, and Unibanco, based in the Barão de Iguape Building, in Patriarca Square. Banco do Brasil, which began its activities in São Paulo in a branch at the intersection of Quitanda and Álvares Penteado streets, where the local unit of the Banco do Brasil Cultural Center now stands, built a 142-meter-high building in the historic center of São Paulo in the 1950s to serve as its regional headquarters in the state.

== Urban planning ==
On September 3, 1976, in line with a model that emerged in Germany in the 1930s, twenty traditional streets in the central region were closed to motor vehicle traffic, making them exclusively for pedestrians. The then mayor of the municipality, Olavo Egídio Setúbal, tried to encourage the population to use public transport as a priority.

At the time, the historic center was still the financial hub of the city, and the measure was received with much criticism and trepidation. After these streets were closed to vehicles, local traders began to complain about a considerable drop in customer traffic. However, even today the so-called calçadões remain one of the most striking urban features of São Paulo's historic center.

== Tourist attractions ==
The concentration of a large number of historical, architectural and cultural landmarks highlights the region's popularity among tourists and visitors. Among the events is the Caminhada Noturna (English: Night Walk), a free tour of the city center held about a decade ago, which takes place every Thursday starting on the steps of the Municipal Theater at 8 pm. Some of the most popular and well-known tourist attractions are:

- Metropolitan Cathedral of Our Lady Assumption and Saint Paul: It was officially inaugurated in 1954, still unfinished, as part of the celebrations for the fourth centenary of the city of São Paulo. In 2002, it was restored and completely finished, respecting its original design. One of the largest neo-Gothic style churches in the world, it is located in Sé Square, which is also home to the Zero Milestone monument, the city's most central point:
- Municipal Theatre of São Paulo: Inaugurated in 1911, its architectural design was developed by Ramos de Azevedo's office to meet the needs of the demanding social elite made up of coffee barons, who demanded a venue for high standard shows and opera similar to those found in Europe. It is located in Ramos de Azevedo Square;
- National Sanctuary of Saint Joseph of Anchieta in Pátio do Colégio: It was built according to the same principles as the original structure erected in 1554, when the city was founded, and houses a collection of stories about the people who participated during the city's establishment;
- St Benedict's Monastery: Almost as old as the city itself, the monastery is one of the most important Catholic temples in the history of São Paulo. It is famous for its Gregorian chant, the artisan breads made by the monks and its architecture and interior decoration. It is located in Largo São Bento;
- Galeria do Rock on Avenida São João: A famous and traditional meeting point for various urban groups, especially those linked to rock and roll and, more recently, hip-hop culture;
- Observatory of the Altino Arantes Building (Banespa headquarters): A public space at the top of one of the city's most famous and tallest buildings, with 161 meters of height and architecture similar to New York's Empire State Building. It stands out in the local landscape and offers visitors a wide view of the city and metropolitan region;
- Martinelli Building: A sumptuous 130-meter-high building in the classical style built by Count Giuseppe Martinelli between the 1920s and 1930s in Antônio Prado Square. In addition to its architecture, it has an attractive terrace open to visitors, where there is a mansion designed for Giuseppe's family and a variety of stories ranging from the period when it was frequented by São Paulo's aristocracy to when it was in serious disrepair and threatened with demolition;
- Anhangabaú Valley: Currently closed to traffic, it is a traditional venue for demonstrations, cultural fairs and concerts;
- Caixa Econômica Federal Cultural Center, in Sé Square;
- Banco do Brasil Cultural Center, at the confluence of Alvares Penteado Street and Quitanda Street;
- Viaduto do Chá: the first link between São Paulo's old and new city centers;
- Law School of the University of São Paulo;
- City Museum, located in the Solar da Marquesa de Santos;
- Santa Ifigênia Viaduct: Made of a metal structure brought from Belgium, it was the second bridge between the old and new centers;
- Post Office Palace: Also designed by Ramos de Azevedo, it was the headquarters of the Correios in São Paulo for many years. Today it has been entirely restored and houses the city's largest branch;
- Praça das Artes: Located between Conselheiro Crispiniano Street, Avenida São João and the Anhangabaú Valley, it is a cultural complex that aims to revitalize the region through culture, housing concert halls, dance, theater, as well as serving as a support structure for the Municipal Theatre of São Paulo;
- Copan Building: A modernist building with a sinuous shape designed by Oscar Niemeyer, which attracts tourists and architecture students from all over the world;
- Handicraft Fair in Republic Square;
- Corner of Ipiranga and Avenida São João, a famous spot eternalized by the lyrics of Caetano Veloso's song Sampa;
- Júlio Prestes Cultural Center: Restored in 1997 to become the headquarters of the São Paulo State Symphony Orchestra, it has the largest and most modern hall in Latin America.

== Cinemas ==
Today, the historic center of São Paulo is also characterized by old abandoned buildings. Formerly luxurious architectural projects, they are now home to vulnerable populations. Among these structures, some were large spaces dedicated to the cinema, with several screening rooms.

- Cine Marrocos: Located in Conselheiro Crispianiano Street, between the Municipal Theater and Largo do Paiçandu, it opened in 1952. Considered one of the most luxurious in South America, today it belongs to São Paulo City Hall and has been occupied by the Homeless Workers' Movement (MTST);
- Cine Art Palácio: Located on Avenida São João, next to Galeria do Rock, it opened in 1936 under the name Ufa Palácio. The building has been declared a landmark and belongs to São Paulo City Hall. Today, part of it is closed and abandoned, while another part houses adult movie theaters. On the doorstep, homeless people build their shelters;
- Cine Paissandu: Located in Largo do Paiçandu, it opened in 1957. Today, the building is in a state of total abandonment, with the first floor serving as a clandestine parking lot for cars. The property now belongs to the Marabraz chain of stores, which has yet to present any plans for renovating and using the site;
- Cine Olido: Located inside Galeria Olido, also on Avenida São João, it underwent renovations after being closed for years. Today it is one of the few old cinemas in operation and has a total of seven screening rooms with decorative features from the 50s;
- Cine Marabá: Located on Ipiranga Avenue, it opened in 1944. In 2009, Playarte took over management of the space, which was refurbished and reactivated under the name Multiplex Playarte Marabá.

== See also ==
- Central Zone of São Paulo
- Tourism in the city of São Paulo
