= Othon Palace Hotel =

Hotel in São Paulo, Brazil

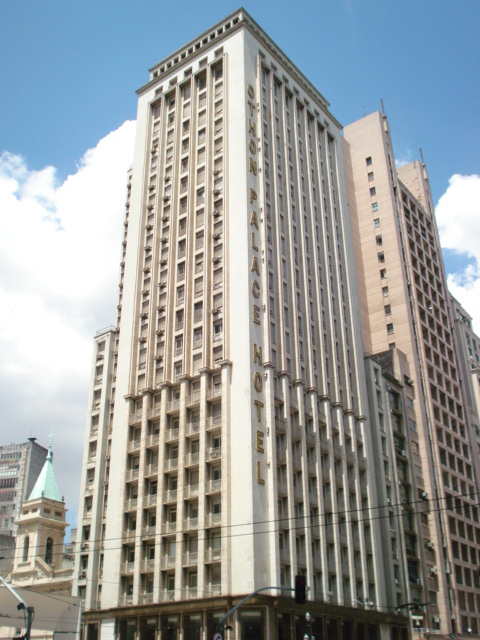
- Facade of the building

- Location within São Paulo Othon Palace Hotel (Brazil)

General information
- Location: São Paulo, São Paulo; Brazil
- Coordinates: 23°32′52.2″S 46°38′12.5″W
- Inaugurated: 1954
- Closed: 2008

Othon Palace Hotel is located in the historic center of the Brazilian city of São Paulo. Founded by Othon Lynch Bezerra de Mello in 1954, it was part of a hotel network with units in São Paulo, Rio de Janeiro, Belo Horizonte and five other countries (United States, France, Portugal, Argentina and Peru).

== History ==
The Othon hotel chain was founded in 1943 by businessman Othon Lynch Bezerra de Mello. Its first property was the Othon Airport, inaugurated in 1944 in the center of Rio de Janeiro. On December 29, 1954, during São Paulo's 4th Centenary celebrations, the company established the Othon Palace in the city. The building is located on the corner of Líbero Badaró Street, Viaduto do Chá and Patriarca Square, next to the Matarazzo Building, the headquarters of São Paulo City Hall. It had 25 floors, 2 basements, 14,000 square meters of floor space and was designed by the German architect Philipp Lohbauer and decorated by Jacques Monet.

The hotel welcomed Soviet cosmonaut Yuri Gagarin in 1961 and jazz singer Ella Fitzgerald in 1968. It also hosted government leaders such as Queen Elizabeth II of the United Kingdom in 1968 and Japanese Prince Akihito in 1967. In 1978, the Othon Palace was included in the list of the 300 best hotels in the world published by Harpers Queen. The top floor of the building held the Chalet Suisse, a luxury restaurant specializing in fondue that opened in 1966 under the supervision of Max Dahinden.

In 2008, the Othon Palace closed down after operating for over a year with financial losses. In 2009, it was declared of public utility by São Paulo City Hall; in 2011 it was occupied by 200 members of the Movement for the Struggle for Better Housing (Movimento de Luta por Moradia Digna - MLMD). In 2015, the city government announced the restoration and renovation of the Othon Palace to house the Municipal Finance Secretariat and a service plaza capable of serving more than 1,000 people a day.

The renovation lasted two years and cost around R$63 million, funded by the BNDES with IDB resources. The walls of the suites were knocked down to create large lounges. The facade, listed as a historic structure by CONPRESP in 2016, was renovated. Among the original pieces, a glass sign on the entrance door, whose inscription "Othon Palace Hotel" appears with fewer syllables, remains.

== See also ==
- Central Zone of São Paulo
- Tourism in the city of São Paulo
