= Patriarca Square =

Square in São Paulo, Brazil

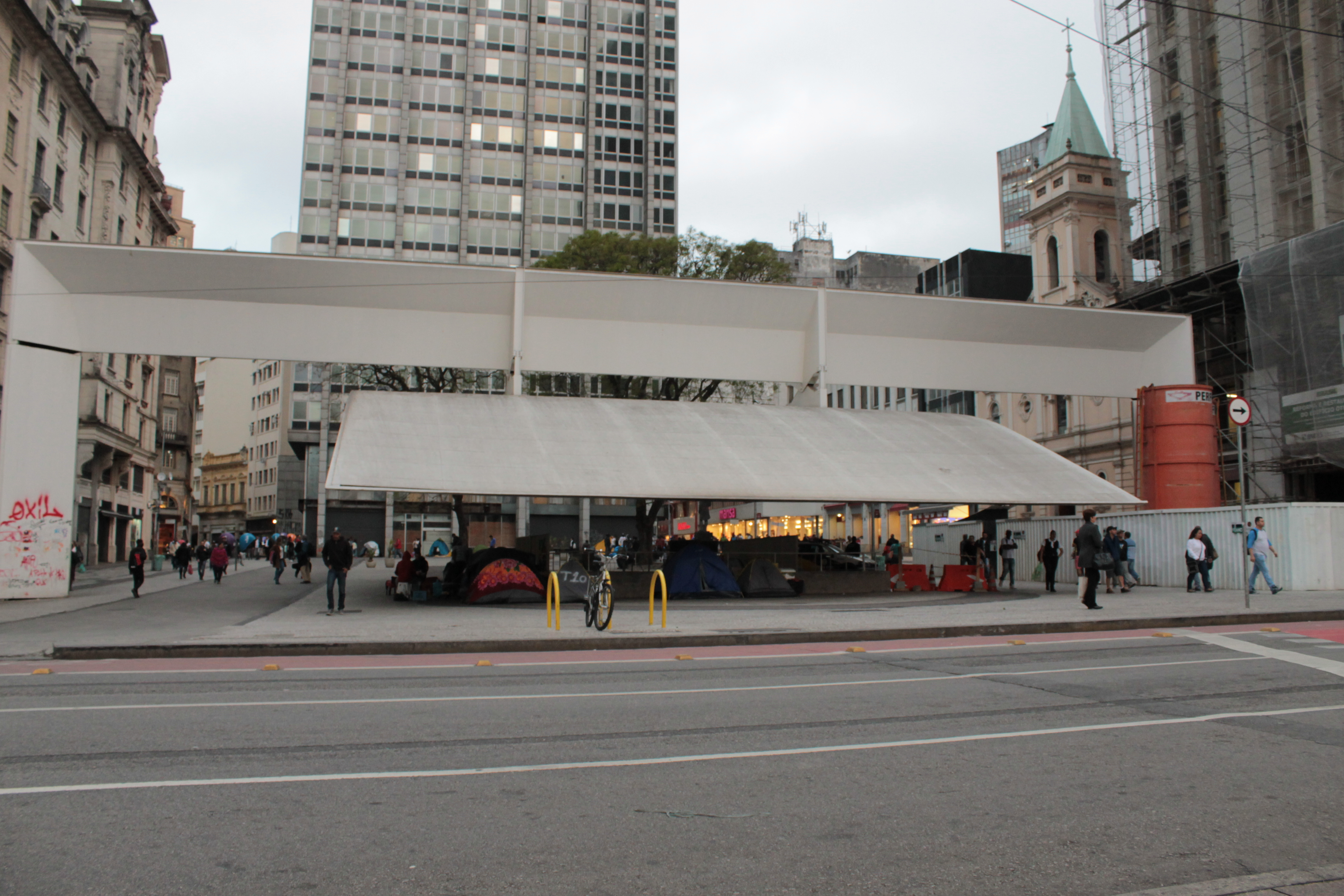
- Exit from the underpass to the Anhangabaú Valley.

- Location within São Paulo Location within Brazil
- Location: São Paulo, São Paulo; Brazil
- Coordinates: 23°32′52″S 46°38′11″W

Construction
- Inauguration: 1912; 114 years ago

The Patriarca Square (Portuguese: Praça do Patriarca) is located in the Sé district, in the historic center of the Brazilian city of São Paulo. It was inaugurated without a name in the 1910s and remained so until 1922, the year of the centenary of Brazil's Independence, when it was renamed Patriarca José Bonifácio Square; in the 1950s it was shortened to Patriarca Square.

The place connects to important points in the city center, such as: Anhangabaú Valley, Viaduto do Chá, and Líbero Badaró, Direita, São Bento, Quitanda and 15 de Novembro Streets. The area is home to the Othon Palace Hotel and the Barão de Iguape and Sampaio Moreira buildings. The Church of Saint Anthony, which is considered to be the oldest church in the center, is in the square.

== History ==
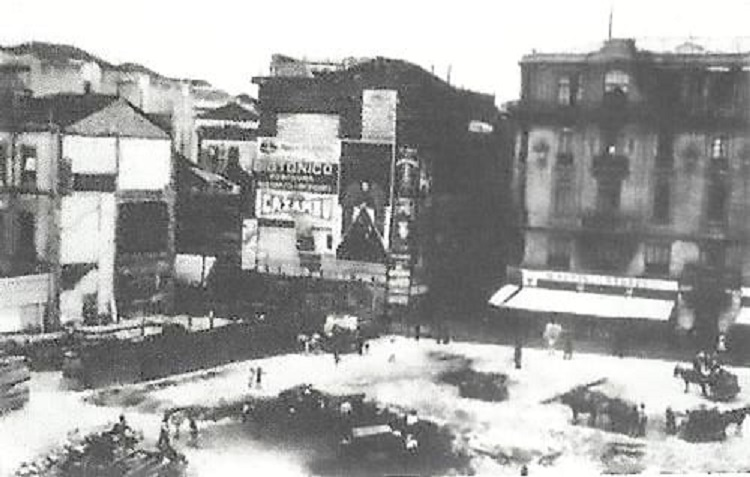
Patriarca Square in April 1922. In the background, the Mappin building, still closed weeks after the fire on January 20, 1922.

The Patriarca Square was created as part of the expansion of São Paulo's city center, with the crossing of the Anhangabaú Valley from the Historic Triangle (whose vertices are the Monastery of Saint Benedict, the Church of Saint Francis and the Church of the Third Order of Carmel).

At the beginning of the 20th century, the city began to develop plans to remodel and modernize the city in line with the interests of an elite who wanted to mirror the European cities. New buildings and new road works appeared, such as the Santa Ifigênia Viaduct and the Municipal Theater. Consequently, the Viaduto do Chá, built in 1892 to connect the "old" and "new" centers, was remodeled to increase the width of the alleyway and facilitate the circulation of streetcars and vehicles.

The project included the creation of a square on the "old center" side of the Viaduto do Chá by demolishing some of the buildings around the bridge exit and expanding the area, which would relieve the traffic on Líbero Badaró, Direita, Quitanda and São Bento streets, the busiest thoroughfares in the city at the time. In 1912, the new square would emerge, still without a name. The buildings in the area, precisely on São Bento, Direita and Líbero Badaró streets, were expropriated and an open area emerged, still without any improvements to make it look like a public square.

The local government's delay in giving the new open space the appearance of a square generated criticism from the press, which lamented the slowness in urbanizing the site. However, the administration's first measure was not to remodel the area and finish the work, but to name the place; on April 24, 1922, it was officially designated Patriarca José Bonifácio Square, inspired by the centenary of Brazil's independence.

On January 13, 1926, with the inauguration of the monument designed by Ramos de Azevedo in the center of the new square, named Lampadário, the square was officially opened. Once completed, the space quickly became a popular spot in the center of São Paulo as new buildings were installed, such as the headquarters of Indústrias Reunidas Fábricas Matarazzo (IRFM) in the former Rotisserie Sportsman building.

=== First reform ===
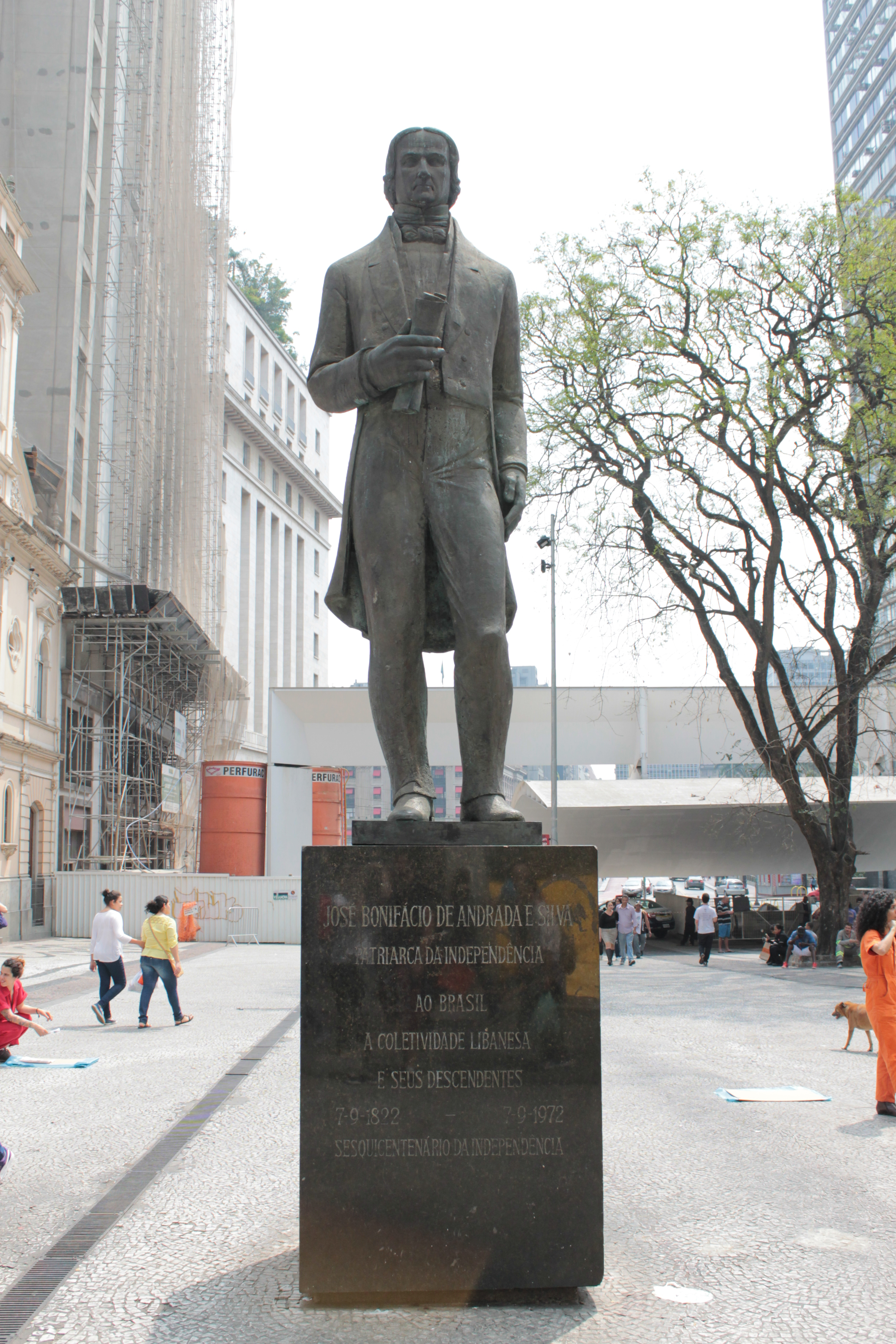
Monument to the Patriarch José Bonifácio.

In the 1930s, the then mayor of São Paulo, Francisco Prestes Maia, together with engineer João Florence de Ulhôa Cintra, began to formulate the famous São Paulo Avenue Plan, which promised to completely change the appearance of the city. In 1940, under the Viaduto do Chá, the Prestes Maia Gallery emerged, whose main access would be through the Patriarca Square. To this end, the Lampadário designed by Ramos de Azevedo was demolished to make way for the gallery's entrance.

=== Second reform ===
In the 1950s, two new buildings completely changed the appearance of the square: the old Mappin headquarters and the small building on the corner of Líbero Badaró, next to the Church of Saint Anthony, were demolished to make way respectively for the Barão de Iguape Building (1959) and the Othon Palace Hotel (1954). In 1972, the Lebanese community donated a statue of José Bonifácio to São Paulo City Hall, after six decades without any reference to him in the space.

=== Third reform ===
At the beginning of the 2000s, there was a debate about restoring the square, which was dirty and neglected. In 2002, a controversial redesign completely transformed the site. As part of a series of initiatives promoted by the Viva o Centro Association to revitalize São Paulo's historic center, the project, which also included the Viaduto do Chá, led to the restoration of the square's original floor, the relocation of José Bonifácio's sculpture and the addition of a new roof for access to the Prestes Maia Gallery. The structure, designed by Paulo Mendes da Rocha, works as a portal to the square, framing the visual perspectives and open spaces. Since then, the square has maintained its new configuration, without any alterations, but to this day the new roof divides opinion as to its practicality and beauty.

The bus stop was also removed, leaving a large space for pedestrians, who can access the square via six different routes. The existing Portuguese mosaic arabesque was reconstructed with the help of photo montages, and a bay for vehicles was created on one side. Inside the gallery, Rocha has installed pieces from various museums in the city of São Paulo in showcases, allowing visitors to come into contact with works of art.

== Historical and cultural significance ==
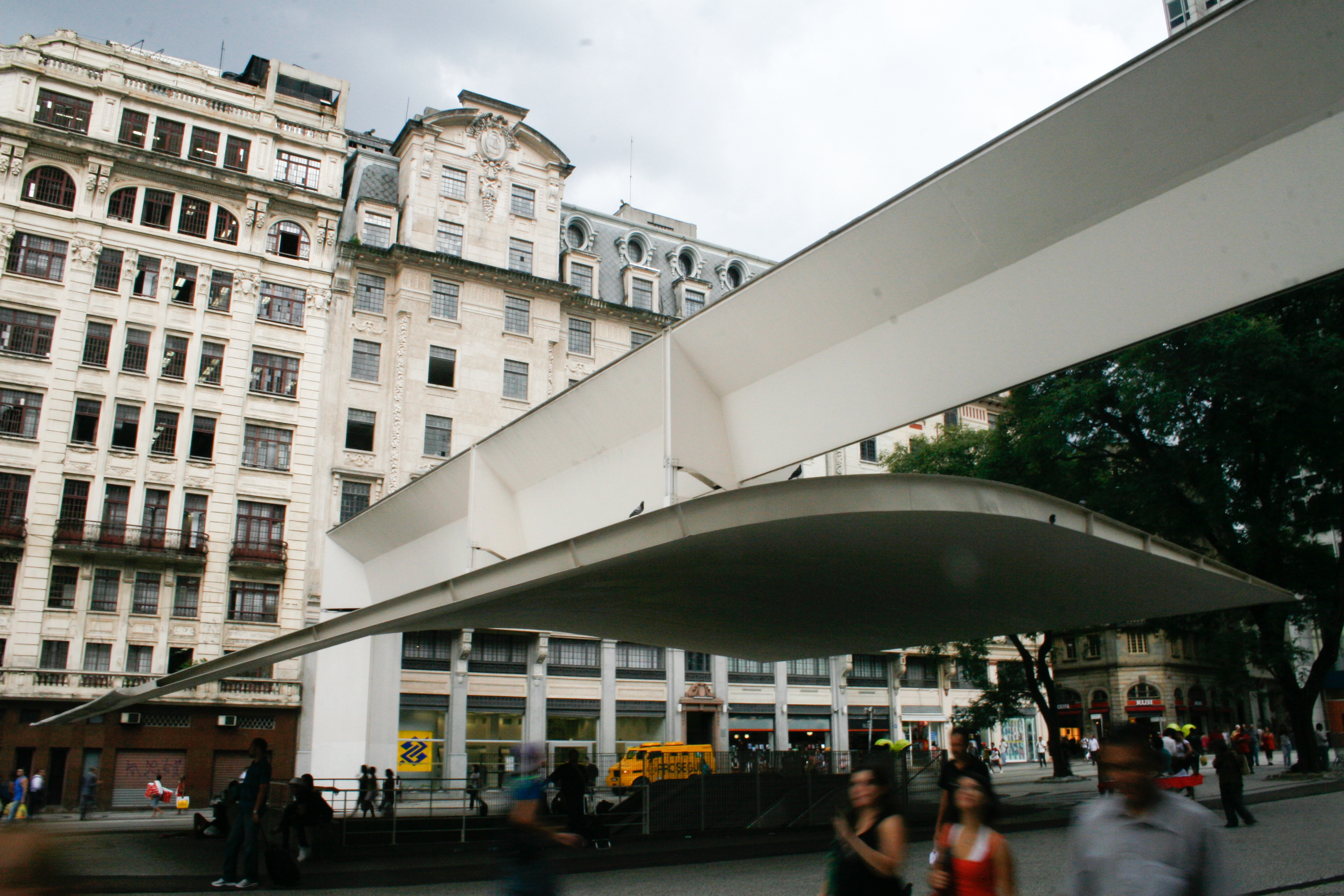
Prestes Maia Gallery roof.

Since 1983, the Preservation Division of the Historical Heritage Department has been conducting the General Inventory of the Environmental, Cultural and Urban Heritage of the City of São Paulo (IGEPAC-SP), with the aim of selecting areas containing assets worthy of preservation for CONPRESP's consideration. According to the methodology adopted, the city is divided into zones that present a certain homogeneity, both in terms of their physical characteristics and historical formation, and regarding their use. As a result, the "old center" was the first area to be studied, as it concentrates a large number of historical assets.

Around Patriarca Square are important buildings from the city's history, such as the São Paulo City Hall, housed in the Matarazzo Building, the Othon Palace Hotel, one of the most famous hotels and the Church of Saint Anthony, the oldest remaining temple in São Paulo. The initiative to revitalize and preserve the so-called "Heart of the City", promoted by the Viva o Centro Association, considered the space as a cultural heritage site, relying heavily on the historical and cultural characteristics of the urban layout, public spaces and buildings in the zone.

Located near the Sé, Anhagabaú and São Bento metro stations, the square is the scene of artistic occupations and a meeting point for demonstrators. The metal roof of the portico designed by Paulo Mendes da Rocha also serves as a roof for the homeless in the neighborhood.

== Gallery ==
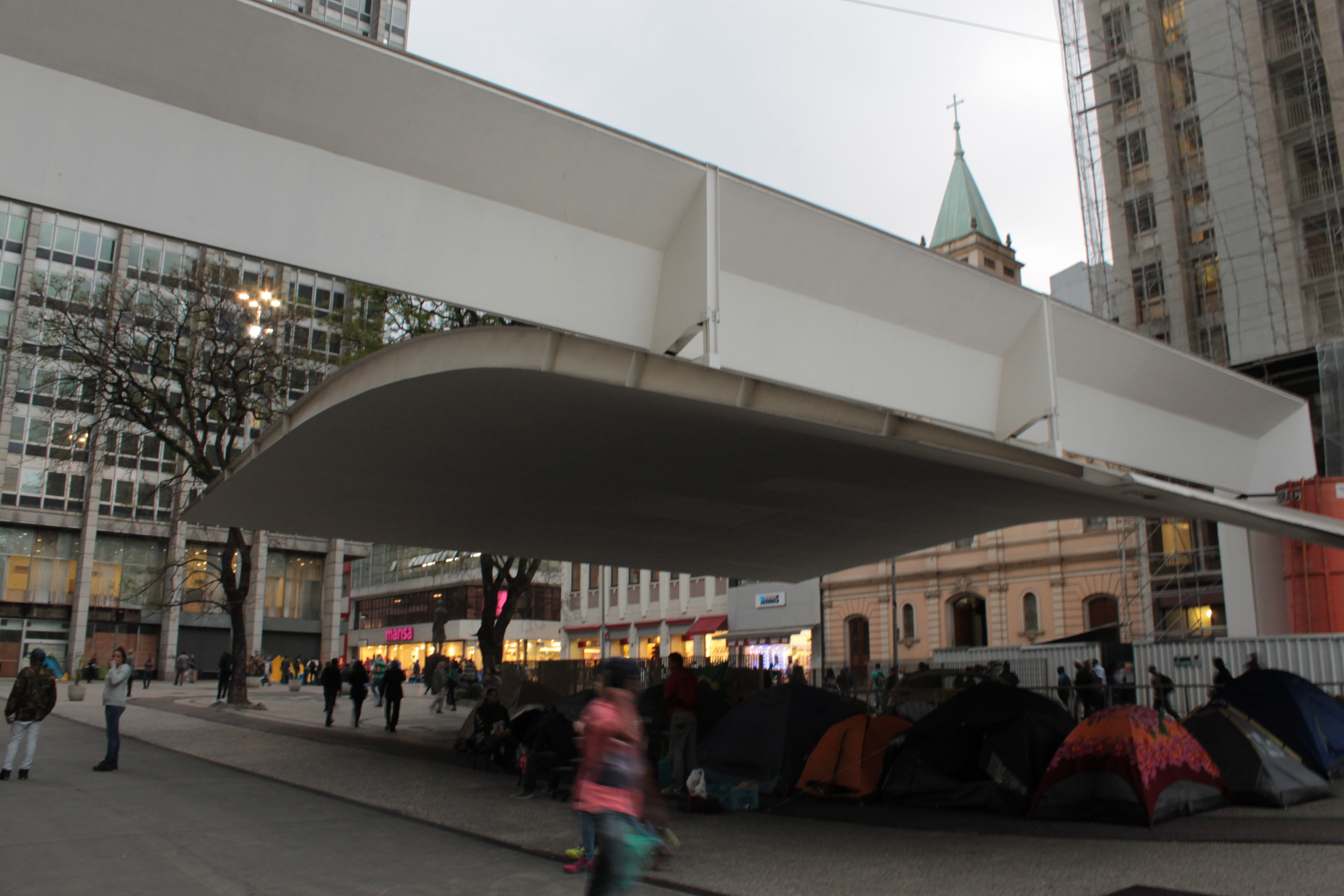
Patriarca Square overlooking the portico.

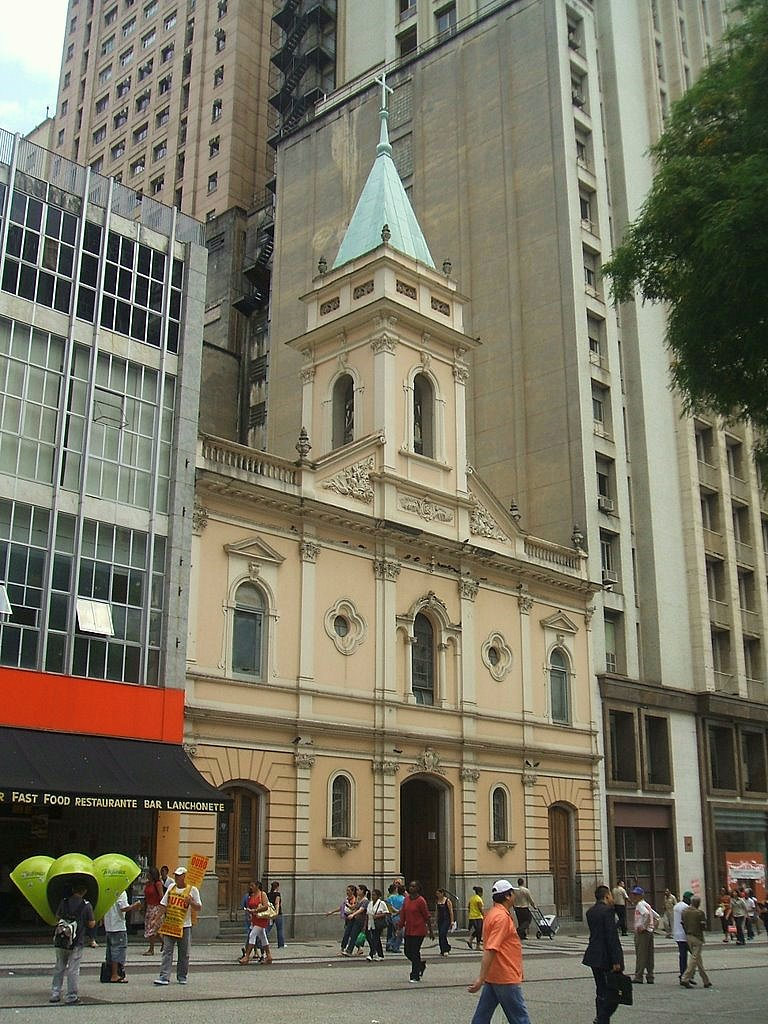
Church of Saint Anthony.

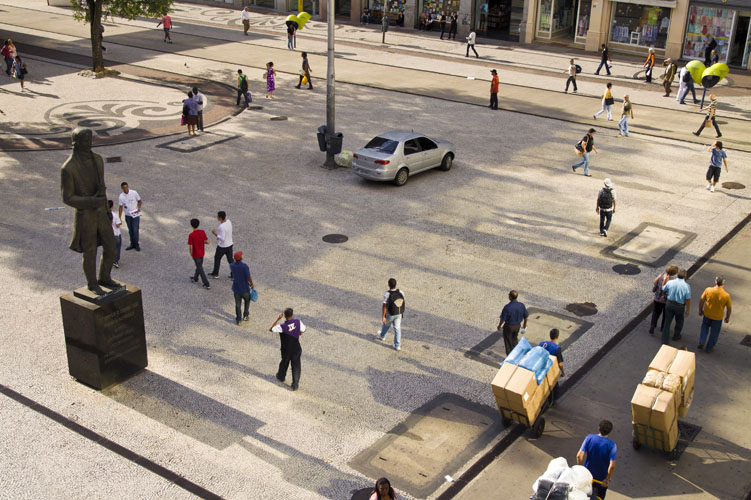
Top view of the square.

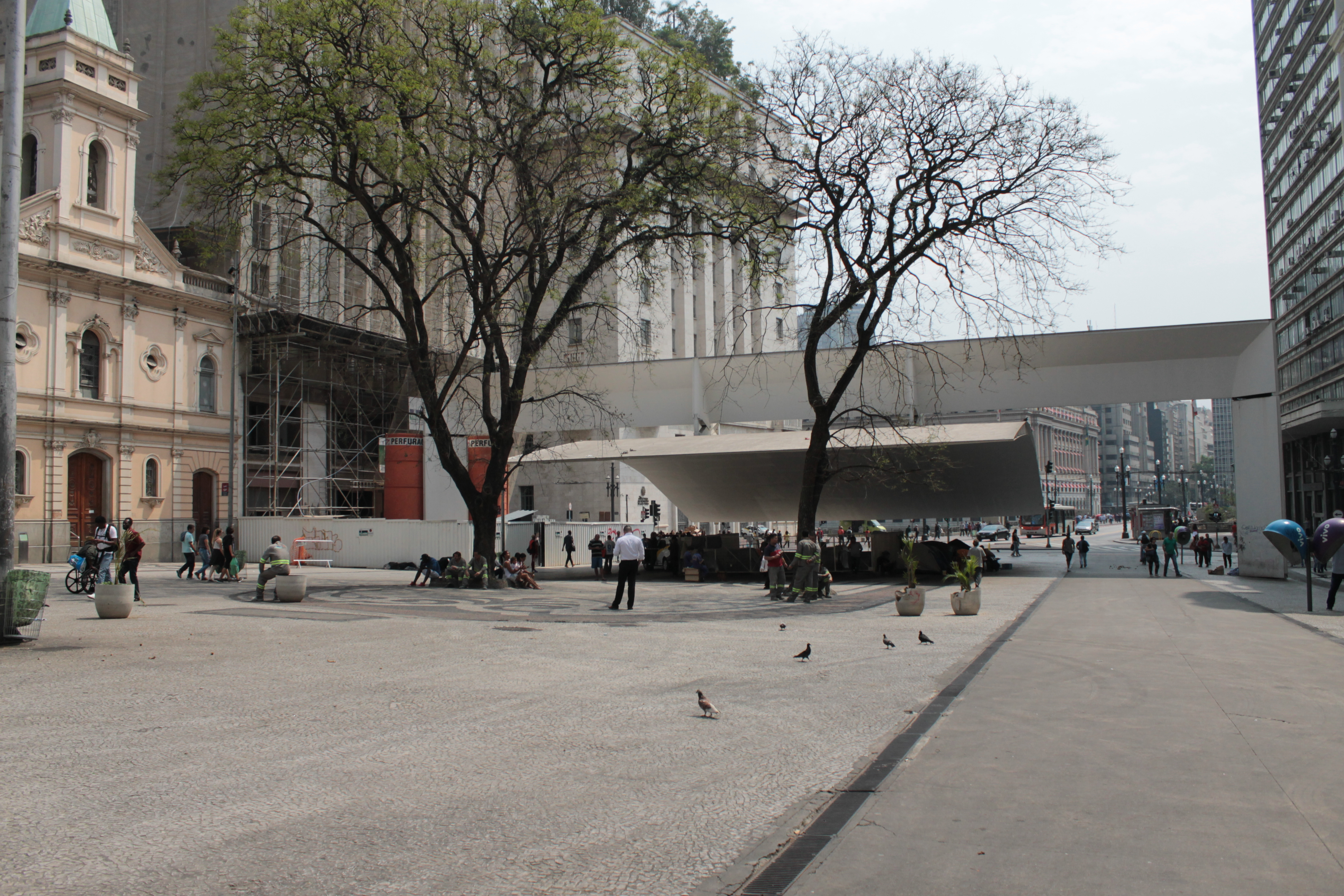
Patriarca Square.

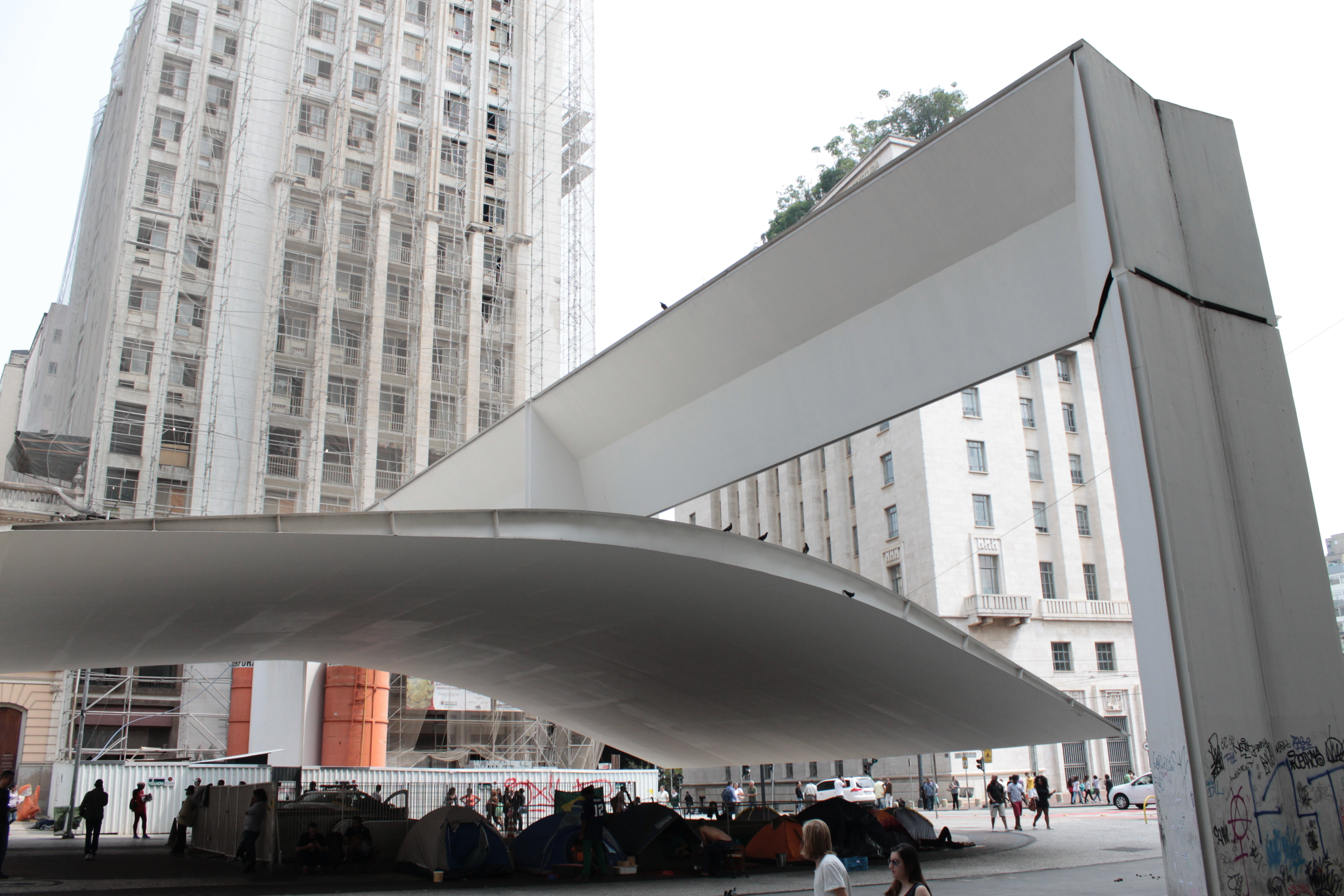
Detail of the portico.

== See also ==
- Historic Center of São Paulo
- Central Zone of São Paulo
- Patriarca-Vila Ré Station
