= Prestes Maia Gallery =

Art space in São Paulo, Brazil

- Galeria Prestes Maia
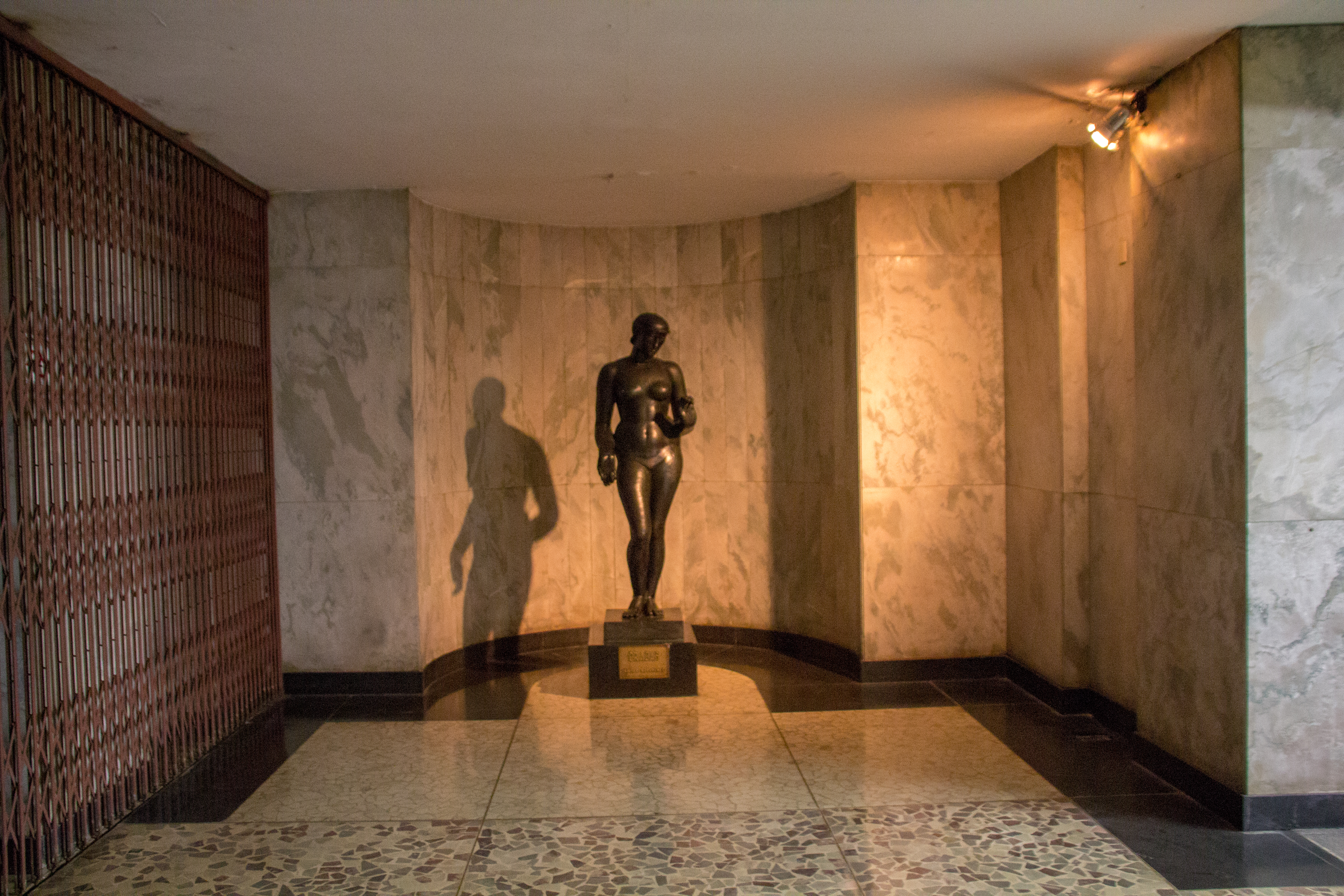

- Location within São Paulo Location within Brazil
- Established: 1940; 86 years ago
- Location: São Paulo, São Paulo; Brazil
- Coordinates: 23°32′50.33″S 46°38′13.71″W

The Prestes Maia Gallery (Portuguese: Galeria Prestes Maia) is an artistic and cultural space located in the city of São Paulo that has an underground connection between Patriarca Square and Anhangabaú Valley, with an exit under the Viaduto do Chá. In 1955, the first public escalators in the city were inaugurated in the gallery's passageway.

== History ==
The Prestes Maia Gallery is composed of three floors: the basement, which gives access to the Anhangabaú Valley under the Viaduto do Chá, the first floor and the mezzanine, where the Almeida Júnior Room is located. Inaugurated in 1940 by then mayor Francisco Prestes Maia, it has a space of 6,000 square meters where, shortly after the inauguration, the Salão Paulista de Belas Artes was held with the presence of artists such as Anita Malfatti. During the opening, then president Getúlio Vargas was preparing to make a long speech, but the announcer introduced him with the phrase "Attention, Brazilians, to the brief words of His Excellency, President Getúlio Vargas", and Vargas simply said: "I have the honor of declaring this gallery inaugurated."

After falling into disrepair in the 1970s, the site became home to administrative offices for public agencies, such as Cohab, until October 2000, and the Guidance and Counseling Center (COA), aimed at AIDS patients, which operated there between 1989 and 1995 and was "a point of reference for doctors and AIDS patients throughout the country" according to the Folha de S. Paulo newspaper. In 1995, these stations began to be deactivated, and renovations and adaptations were announced, including a food court and a small auditorium for lectures, which never came to fruition, as well as the removal of heavy traffic in Patriarca Square, near the entrance to the gallery, with a total budget of five million dollars.

In the following year, this project resulted in the venue being transferred to Masp by decree of then mayor Paulo Maluf. "The gallery was created to be an art space, but it took other directions. We're going to restore the original project," said Sanderley Fiusa in March 1995, president of the commission created by the City Hall to revitalize the center. The possibility of transforming the space into a 24-hour shopping center was also discussed. The intention was not to exhibit any of the 300 works in Masp's permanent collection, but parts of the other 4,700 works that the museum had and, especially, temporary exhibitions that the headquarters couldn't accommodate. Still in 1995, a more extensive project was discussed, which would transform the Anhangabaú Valley into a cultural center and the stretch from the Prestes Maia Gallery to the Municipal Theater into a single cultural space.

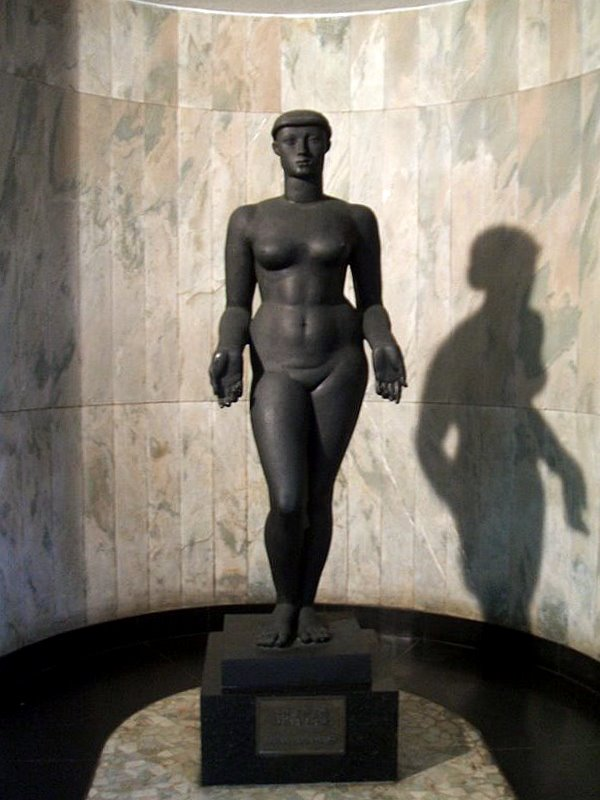
Victor Brecheret (1894-1955) - Graça.

However, the deal with Masp only really began on November 28, 2000, with the exhibition "São Paulo, from Villa to Metropolis", although a few months earlier Masp still considered that the agreement "did not materialize". The so-called Masp-Centro was opened "on a shoestring", with a "small renovation" of three hundred thousand reais, because, according to Neves, then mayor Celso Pitta was determined to inaugurate it - his term would end less than two months later. The branch never had a permanent collection, although it did host several exhibitions and events for companies such as Casa de Criadores and São Paulo Fashion Week. The concession ended in December 2008 when then mayor Gilberto Kassab signed the revocation of the original decree, although the repossession only happened at the beginning of November the following year.

At the time, the space was unoccupied because, according to Masp's management, infiltrations prevented "any activity". Folha de S. Paulo reported in June 2009 that construction had stopped in 2004, but that the infiltrations were only reported to the City Council three years later. Masp had invested "more than three million reais" in elevators, air conditioning, bathroom renovations and improvements to the floor and the plumbing and electrical systems, but complained about the lack of a counterpart from the city government, which was refuted by the Municipal Department of Culture, claiming that, once the concession was granted, maintenance would be Masp's responsibility. The City Hall also claimed that the space was used improperly as a warehouse and that the gallery had been closed in previous years; Masp complained that the decree had been revoked "by surprise".

In 2002, the upper entrance to the gallery, where there used to be a bus station, was covered by a marquee designed by architect Paulo Mendes da Rocha, causing controversy for supposedly affecting the visibility of the Church of Saint Anthony, in Patriarca Square. Carlos Lemos, a professor of Architecture and Urbanism at the University of São Paulo, wrote an article in Folha de S. Paulo three years later in which he criticized the canopy for having replaced the art-deco shelter by architect Elisário Bahiana, part of the Viaduto do Chá project, a listed monument since 1992. "What revitalization has the beautiful and inopportune project brought to the site?" he asked in the article, and then replied: "None, except to provoke complaints." During the construction of the marquee, Masp-Centro was closed.

In 2019, a project was announced to transform the site into the Museum of Citizenship and Human Rights, a space that will be divided into video panels, three halls for events and temporary exhibitions, a 100-seat auditorium and an entrance hall with an area for artistic interventions. Once approved, an executive project can be contracted for the restoration and renovation of the entire gallery, as well as the installation of an elevator on the sidewalk of the Viaduto do Chá, next to the newsstand and near Líbero Badaró Street.

== Culture ==
A Neapolitan nativity scene from 1720, donated by Ciccillo Matarazzo, now part of the collection of the Museum of Sacred Art of São Paulo, was set up for the first time in São Paulo at the gallery. The venue also houses Graça I and Graça II (sculptures by Victor Brecheret) and a bronze replica of Michelangelo's Moses sculpture, made by the School of Arts and Crafts. During the 2010 Virada Cultural, the gallery was used as a stage for "body suspension" sessions, in which people were hoisted up by hooks stuck straight into their backs.

== See also ==
- Central Zone of São Paulo
- Tourism in the city of São Paulo
