= Rosa Grena Kliass =

Brazilian architect

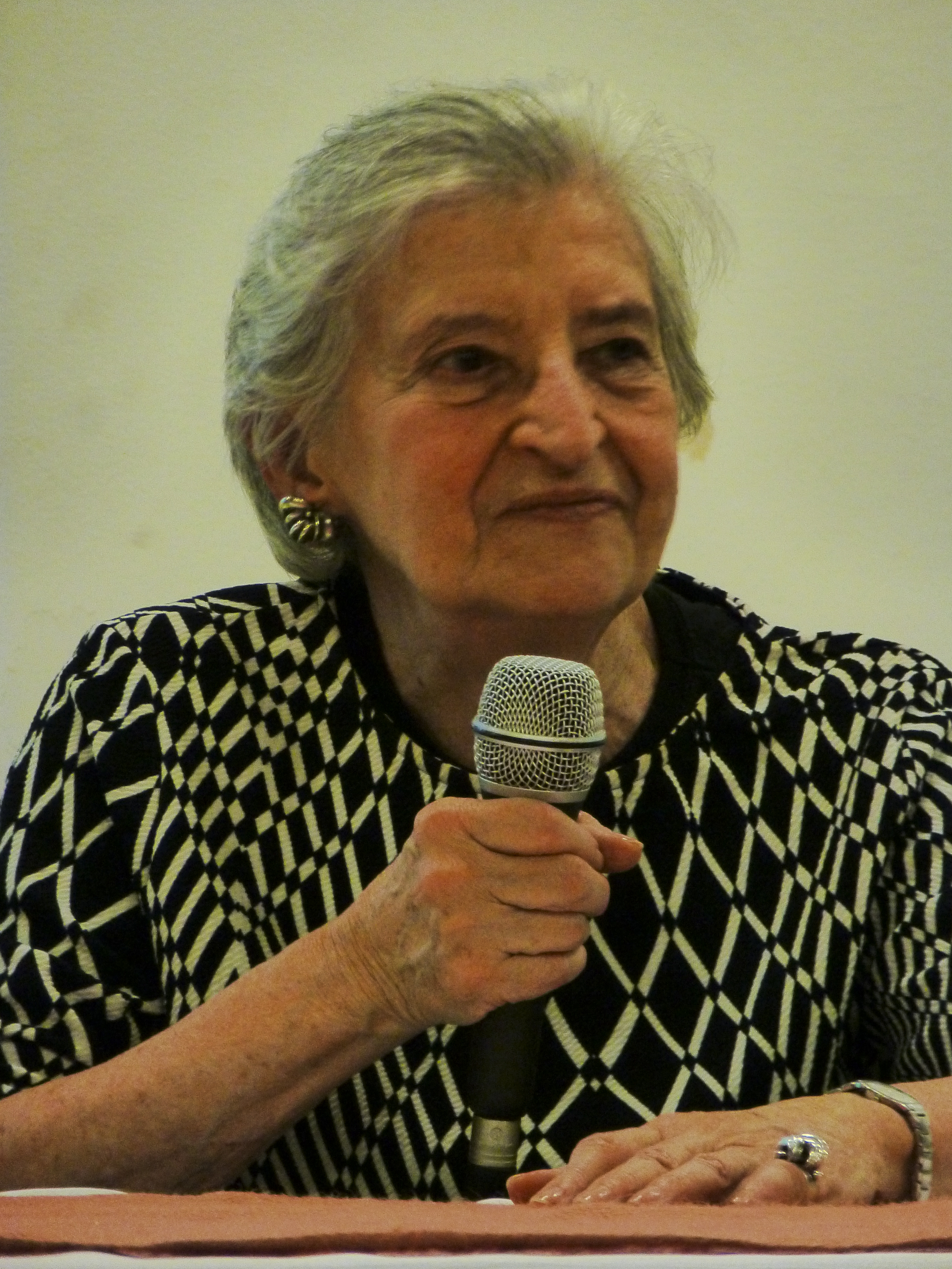
Rosa Grena Kliass

Rosa Grena Kliass (born 15 October 1932) is a Brazilian landscape architect and professor. She is considered to be one of the most significant practicing designers in the history of modern and contemporary landscape architecture in Brazil. Her projects include the renovation of the Anhangabaú Valley, the Parque da Juventude, and the landscape master plan for the city of São Paulo do Maranhão. Kliass also founded and led the Brazilian Association of Landscape Architects in 1976.

== Early life and education ==
Rosa Alembick was born in São Roque, Brazil on October 15, 1932, to parents José Alembick and Sonia Alembick (née Groisman). She went to primary school in São Roque, but moved to São Paulo in 1944 for the state secondary school. Alembick and her family lived in the Jewish community in the district of Bom Retiro in São Paulo.

Alembick attended the Faculty of Architecture and Urbanism of the University of São Paulo, and graduated in architecture in 1955. During her time there, landscape design was taught in the final year, by American landscape designer Roberto Coelho Cardozo. Through Cardozo, Alembick was introduced to designers in California, including Thomas Church, Garrett Eckbo and Lawrence Halprin. During her studies, she also spent time in Rino Levi’s office, and there also met Roberto Burle Marx.

In 1956, Alembick married architect Wlademir Kliass (1929-1985). The couple had two children, Paulo (b.1958) and Sonia (b. 1964).

== Career ==
Soon after graduating, Kliass established her own office, Rosa Grena Kliass Landscape Planning and Projects, Ltd. In 1958, Kliass was invited by the mayor of her hometown São Roque to design Largo dos Mendes, for which she also won the São Paulo City Hall Prize. In 1969, Kliass was awarded a scholarship from the USAID to visit the United States and learn about the profession and teachings of landscape architecture there. She returned to the University of São Paulo to receive her Master's in Urban Planning, graduating in 1989. Her master's thesis ultimately led to the book she authored, titled Urban Parks of São Paulo, published in 1993.

Kliass’ firm completed many urban and institutional projects across Brazil, including master plans for São Paulo, Curitiba, Salvador, and São Luis do Maranhão. Her most notable projects include the renovation of the Anhangabaú Valley and the landscapes of international airports in Brasília and Belém. The refurbishment of São Paulo’s Vale do Anhangabaú in 1991 was executed through a competition won by urban planner Jorge Wilheim and landscape architect Rosa Grena Kliass and marked the return of landscape architecture and public civic space in Brazil under the new democratic government. The project reconnected two sections of downtown São Paulo long divided by highways and infrastructure by creating a large pedestrian space elevated above the street.

While working on a project in São Paulo for Mayor Faria Lima, Kliass formed a group of landscape designers in city hall with co-worker and friend Miranda Magnoli, and convinced the mayor to form the Department of Parks and Green Areas of the City of São Paulo.

Alongside designing landscape projects, Kliass was also a consultant for several governmental institutions, including the Department of Economics and Planning in São Paulo, the Department of Water and Electrical Energy, the Municipality of São José dos Campos in São Paulo State, and the Metropolitan Agency for Housing in São Paulo. She also served as Director of Planning for the Department of Planning in São Paulo City (SEMPLA), and was a member for the Administration Council of CETESB (Environmental Sanitation and Technology Company). In 1976, Kliass founded the Brazilian Association of Landscape Architects (ABAP) and served as its president for five non-consecutive years throughout 1980-2000. She was also closely tied to the International Federation of Landscape Architects (IFLA) and coordinated the 16th IFLA World Congress held in Salvador, Bahia.

Kliass taught landscape architecture and urban design at the Faculty of Architecture and Urbanism of Mackenzie University in São Paulo from 1974-1977. She also taught at the School of Architecture and Urbanism at the Catholic University of Paraná, where she coordinated the landscape architecture program from 1980-1982.

On September 13, 2019, Kliass was the first woman to receive the Colar de Ouro of the Institute of Architects of Brazil.

== Selected projects ==
Parque da Juventude (São Paulo, Brazil)

Vale do Anhangabaú (São Paulo, Brazil)

Mangal das Garças (Heron Mangrove) (Belém, Pará)

Banhado Regional Park (São José dos Campos)

== Selected bibliography ==
Kliass, Rosa Grena. Parques Urbanos De São Paulo. 1a ed. São Paulo, Brazil]: Pini Editora, 1993. Print.

Kliass, Rosa. "Planning and Conservation: Green Areas and the Environmental Quality of the City of São Paulo." Third World Planning Review 12.4 (1990): 351- 360. Web.

Rosa Grena Kliass, and Miranda Martinelli Magnoli. "Áreas Verdes De Recreação." Paisagem E Ambiente 21 (2006): Paisagem E Ambiente, 1 June 2006, Issue 21. Web.

"Rosa Grena Kliass Arquiteta."

"Arquitetas Invisíveis Presents 48 Women in Architecture: Part 6, Landscape Architecture." Delaqua, Victor. ArchDaily. 2015-03-14. Retrieved 2020-01-13.
