= Caminhada Noturna =

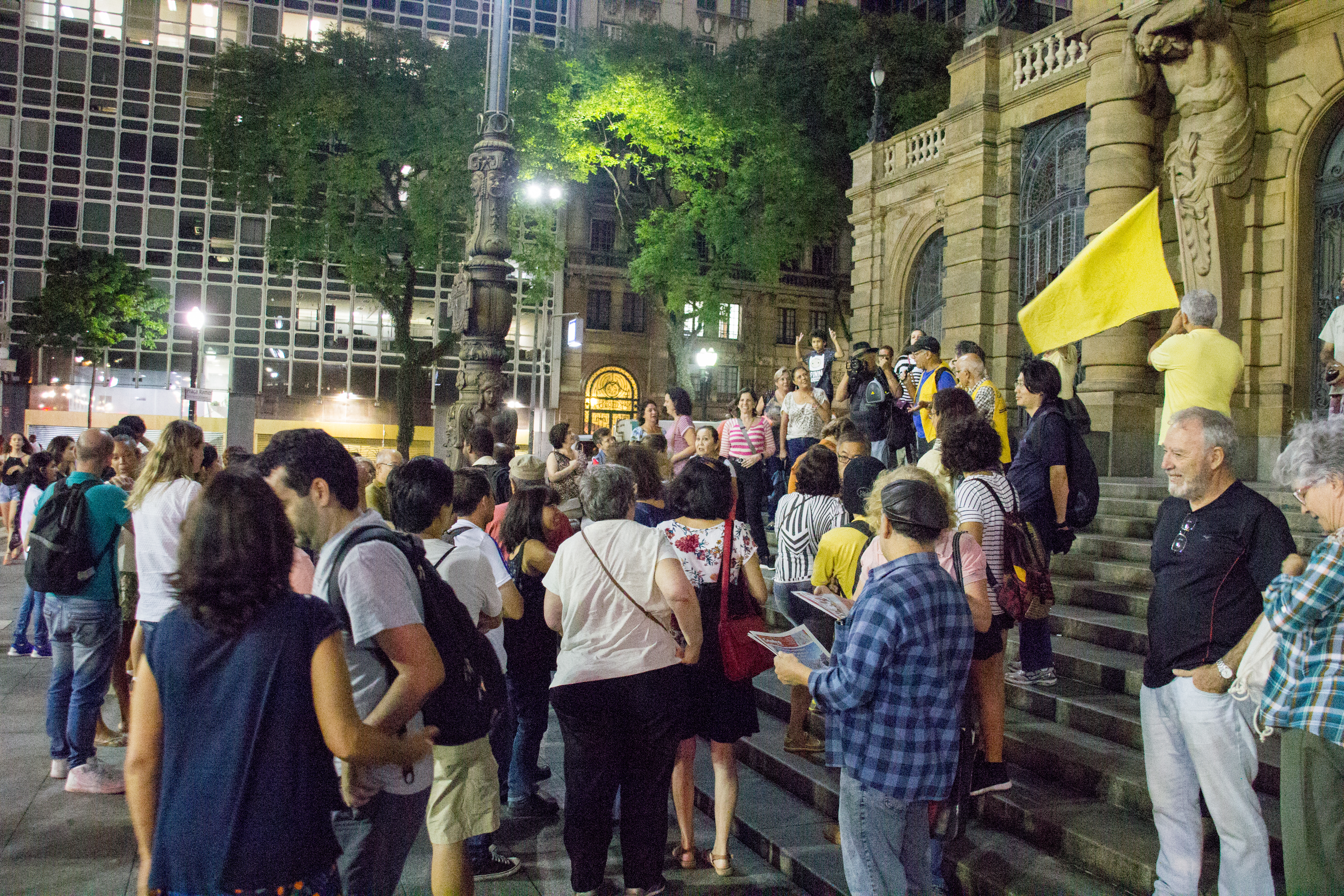
- Participants in February 2017
- Status: Active
- Genre: History and architecture
- Frequency: Every Thursday, 8-10pm
- Years active: 21
- Inaugurated: September 2005
- Founder: Carlos Beutel
- Website: www.caminhadanoturna.com.br

Caminhada Noturna ("Night Walk") is a weekly walking tour of the centre of São Paulo. It takes place every Thursday between 8 and 10 pm, starting and ending at the Municipal Theatre. It has taken place over 300 times since September 2005. It is attended by 50–100 people each week, a mix of locals and tourists, peaking at 300 attendees in 2012. The walk is free to attend, and is supported by the local tourism organisation.

It was founded by Carlos Beutel, who owns a vegetarian restaurant in the area. It was originally going to be a day walk, but it changed to a night walk following a suggestion by Carmen Gimenez and Nadir Khouri based on an existing night walk in Barcelona. It was associated with efforts to restore the centre of São Paulo, and a weekly community meeting to discuss problems in the local area of Rua Barão de Itapetininga. The first tours started from Mário de Andrade Library, changing to the Theatre in 2006.

Tour guides were arranged in 2006. Each tour has a guest speaker (often an architect, artist or a local), who talks about the theme of the walk. The walks cover the historical buildings and architecture in the centre of the city.
