= Barão de Iguape Building =

Building in São Paulo, Brazil

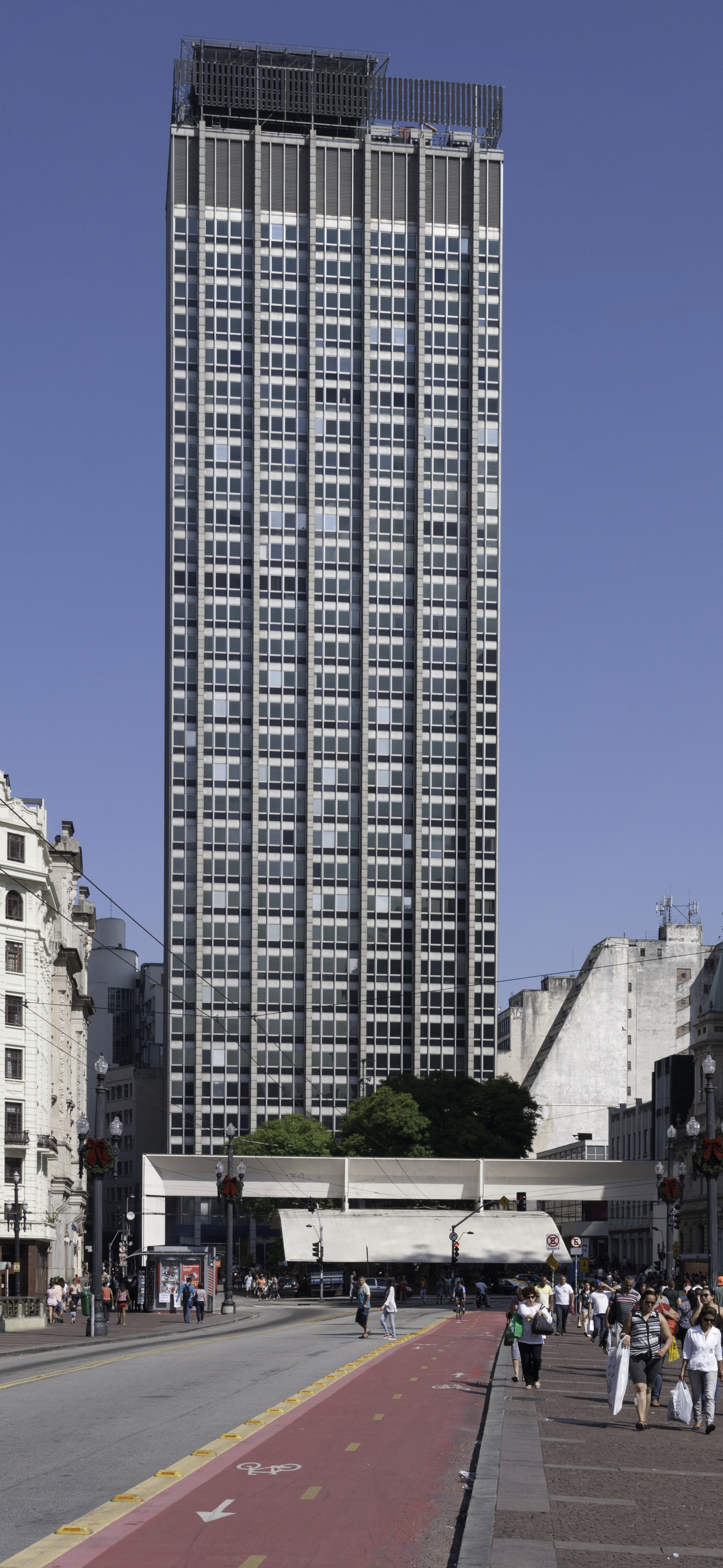
- The Barão de Iguape Building view of 30º floors of Mercantil Finasa
- Interactive map of the Barão de Iguape Building area

General information
- Coordinates: 23°32′52″S 46°38′09″W
- Construction started: 1958
- Completed: 1959
- Opening: 1959

Height
- Roof: 436 ft (133 m)

Technical details
- Floor count: 37

Barão de Iguape Building is a skyscraper in the older area of downtown São Paulo, Brazil, 133 metres (436 ft) in height with 37 floors, located on Patriarca square on the corner of Direita and Quitanda streets. Its construction was completed in 1959.

The building was for years the headquarters of a bank, Unibanco, but this was transferred to another building on the Marginal Pinheiros expressway, next to Eusébio Matoso bridge in the southwestern neighborhood of Pinheiros.

== See also ==
- Mirante do Vale
- Altino Arantes Building
