= Vale do Anhangabaú =

Park and valley in São Paulo, Brazil

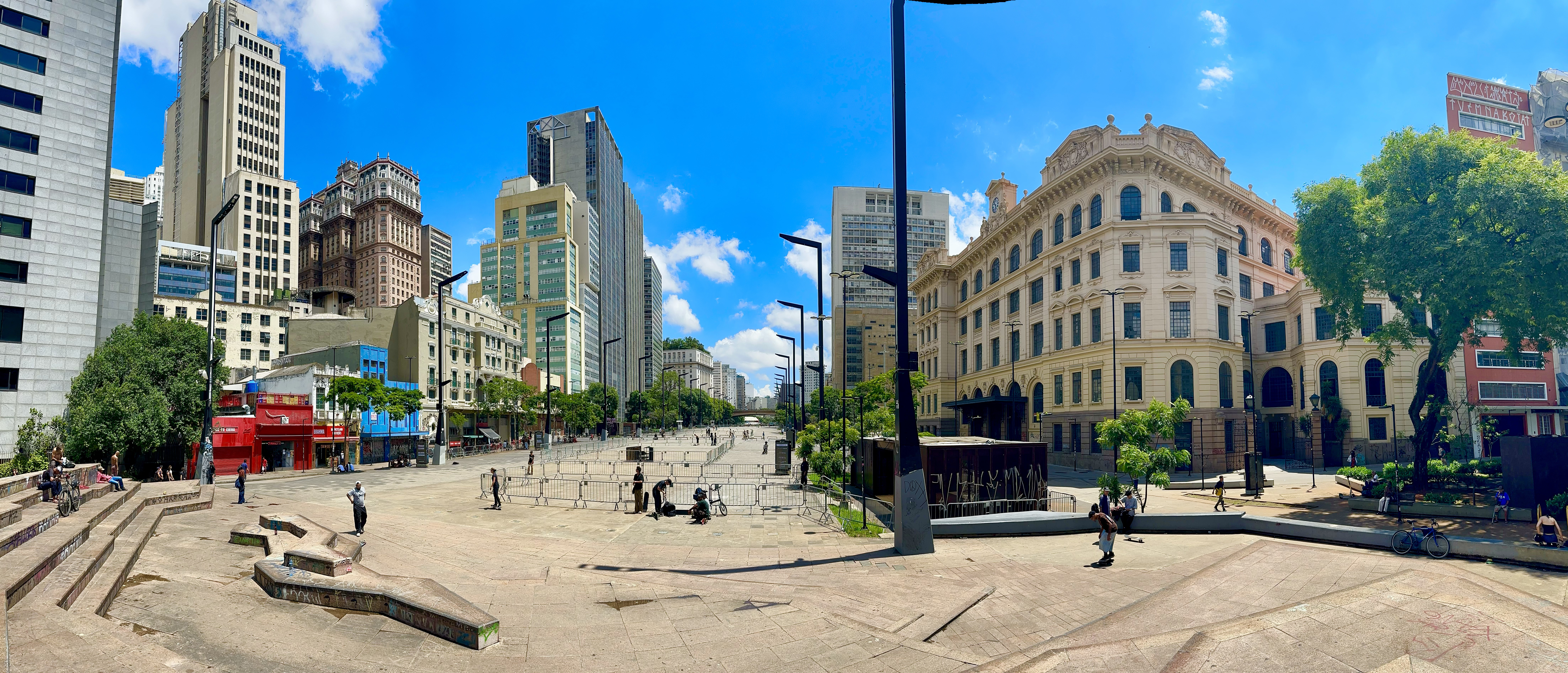
- Location: Brazil
- Coordinates: 23°32′45″S 46°38′13″W
- Location of Vale do Anhangabaú

Vale do Anhangabaú (Anhangabaú Valley) is a region in the city center of São Paulo, located between the viaducts do Chá and Santa Ifigênia. It is a public space commonly characterized as park, where events have traditionally been organized, such as public demonstrations, political rallies, presentations and popular shows. It is considered the point that separates the Old City Center from the New City Center.

Currently, the 43 thousand square meters of the Anhangabaú Valley are used as a crossing point for people wishing to transit between the east and west regions of the center, and can be defined as an extensive boardwalk under a road junction. The space also interconnects with other squares in the central area, such as Ramos de Azevedo Square, juxtaposed with the Valley, Largo São Bento, through the steps of the Metro and Praça da Bandeira, which currently houses a bus station.

With gardens, works of art and three fountains, Vale do Anhangabaú is today a postcard of the City Center of São Paulo, from where it is possible to glimpse buildings such as the Martinelli, Altino Arantes, Teatro Municipal, and the Matarazzo Building, headquarters of city hall. The space also acts as a stage for Virada Cultural, a traditional event in São Paulo that promotes shows and cultural activities throughout the city. Due to its wide dimension, the Valley is considered an adequate space for large public meetings and was even the stage for the largest Brazilian public rally, in the Diretas Já demonstrations, organized on April 16, 1984, when it was received about 1.5 million people. In addition to being in a region that houses all the places mentioned above, the Vale do Anhangabaú is also located near the Dramatic and Musical Conservatory of São Paulo, which is called the School of Dance of São Paulo, also known as the School of Dance of the Municipal Theater of São Paulo (EDTMSP). Basically, it is a university campus that concentrates classes on public dance in the city.

== History ==
=== Origins and first occupations ===
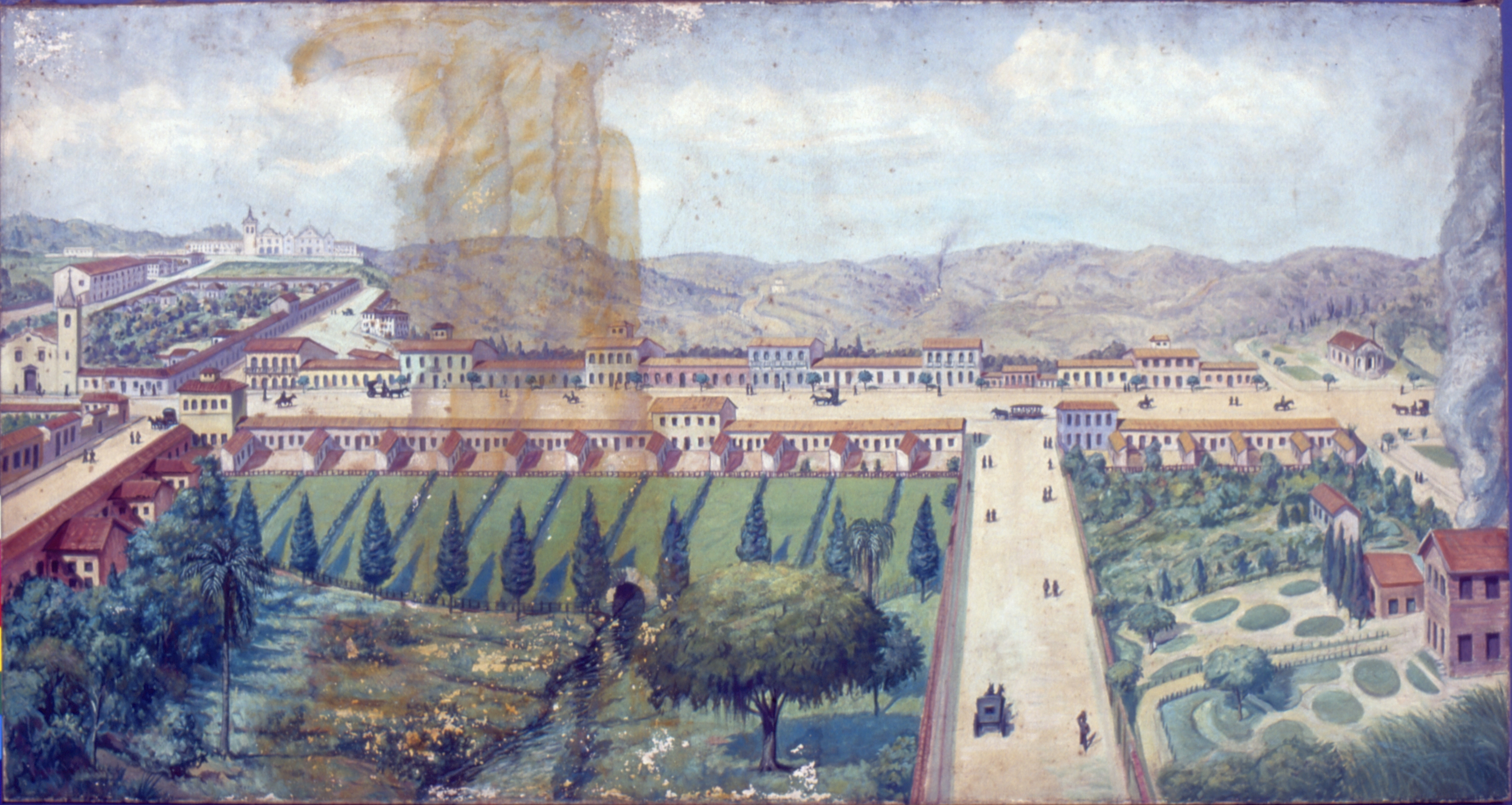
Earthwork project for Anhangabaú, 1878

The Anhangabaú River, which gave origin to the Valley, is born as Saracura Stream, which runs through Avenida 9 de Julho and goes through the Anhangabaú Valley, reaching its mouth at Tamanduateí River, at the47 edge of Municipal Market. Thus, the Tamanduateí constitutes a kind of delta with its main tributary, Anhangabaú. The name Anhangabaú possibly derives from the fact that its waters are very ferreous and acidic - in Tupi, it means "poisonous water". The indigenous people considered the river cursed and, currently, it is channeled and hidden, except for its springs, which are outdoors, between the regions of Vila Mariana and Paraíso. Because of its size, the Valley was the scene of historical facts of great national importance, such as the inauguration of the Viaduto do Chá in 1892, the channeling of Anhangabaú River in 1906, and the replacement of the park's gardens by avenues, in 1940, following the architectural changes of the city.

=== Landscaping and reurbanisation ===
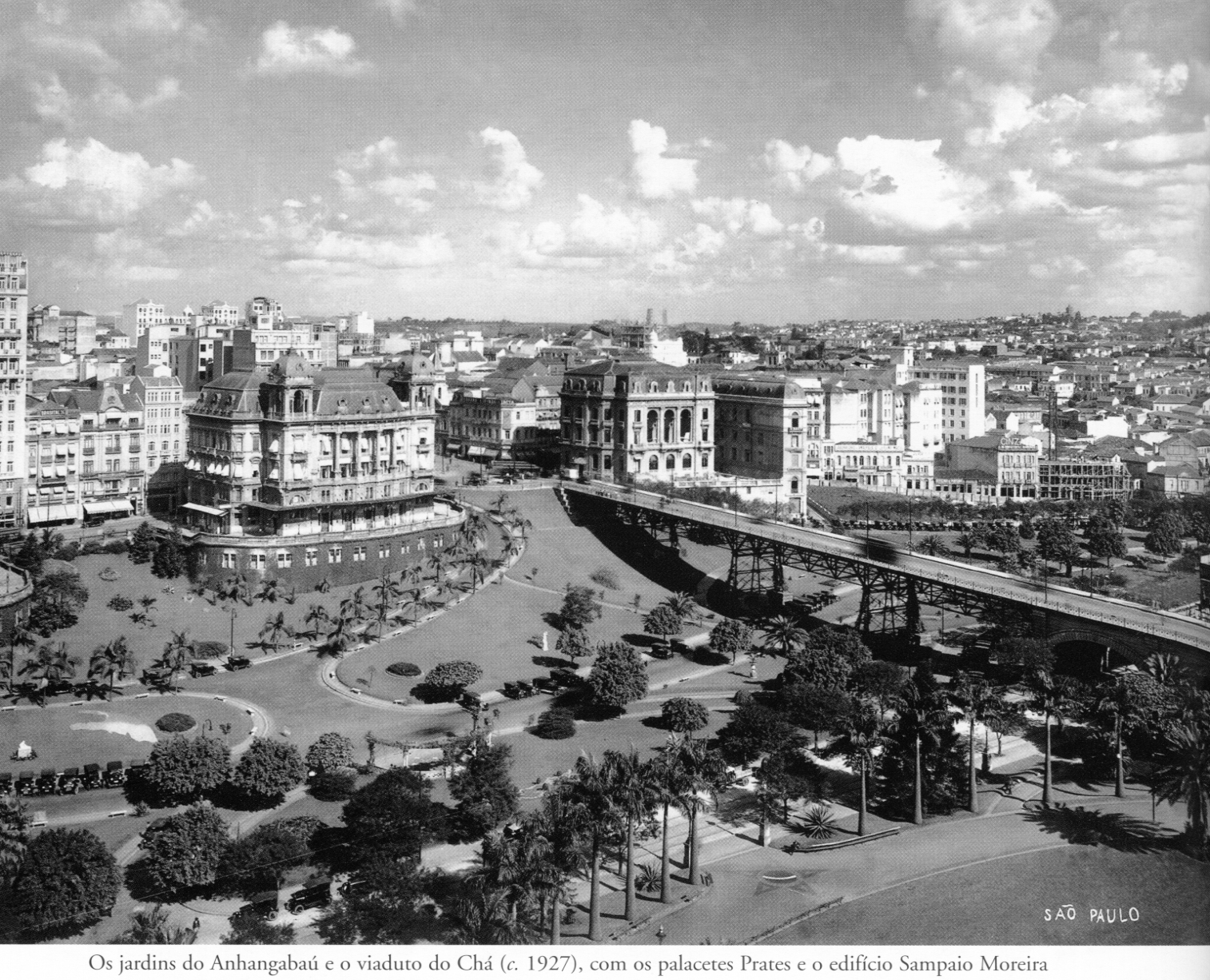
Anhangabaú Park in the 1920s

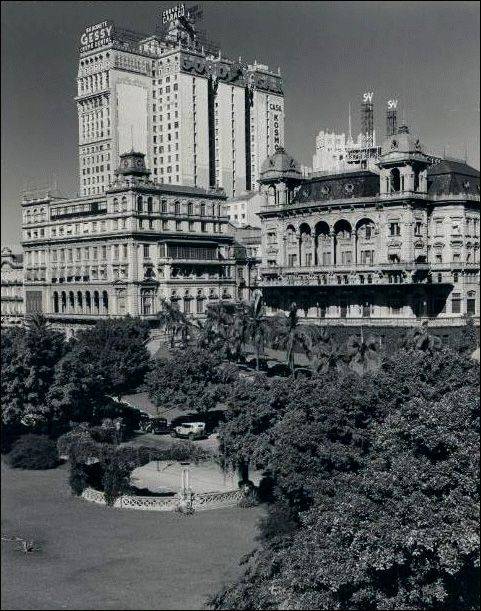
Palacetes Prates in 1931

In 1877, the urbanization of the area began, through the idealization of the Viaduto do Chá — which would only be inaugurated in 1892. For the construction of the viaduct, only the lane used for the work was expropriated. In 1884, Decree 233 (the first sanitary code in the State of São Paulo) was made to contribute to the newly created Sanitary Service body. The code contained some rules that provided improvements to the soil issue in the cities, such as more trees, paving the streets and draining wet land, which indicated that the drainage of the floodplains of São Paulo became a norm.

During the administration of João Alfredo Correia, from Pernambuco who presided over São Paulo between 1885 and 1886, several works were also started. He proposed to create a circular boulevard around the central area, so that it would comprise a gigantic avenue full of trees, from Brás to Ipiranga, in the clean and drained floodplain of the Tamanduateí River, which, in turn, would connect to other avenues and even the Anhangabaú Stream — which was being rectified at the time. Even with so many suggestions for urban improvement, despite their proposals, the complexity of elaborating the works was greater than what monarchic governments could act at that moment, so they were not carried out.

In 1910, a great afforestation of the Anhangabaú Valley was carried out, resulting in the formation of the Anhangabaú Park. This project took shape from a combination of three projects, including "Grandes Avenidas", by the architect Alexandre Albuquerque, which resulted in the urbanization of the valley with the insertion of buildings.

Between 1920 and 1930, Vale do Anhangabaú served as an important center for socialization and encounters between homosexuals. The Anhangabaú Park served as a meeting point for men and women who wanted to find partners and manifest themselves sexually. It was a place that had many spots that were already characterized by prostitutes and homosexuals in search of sexual partners.

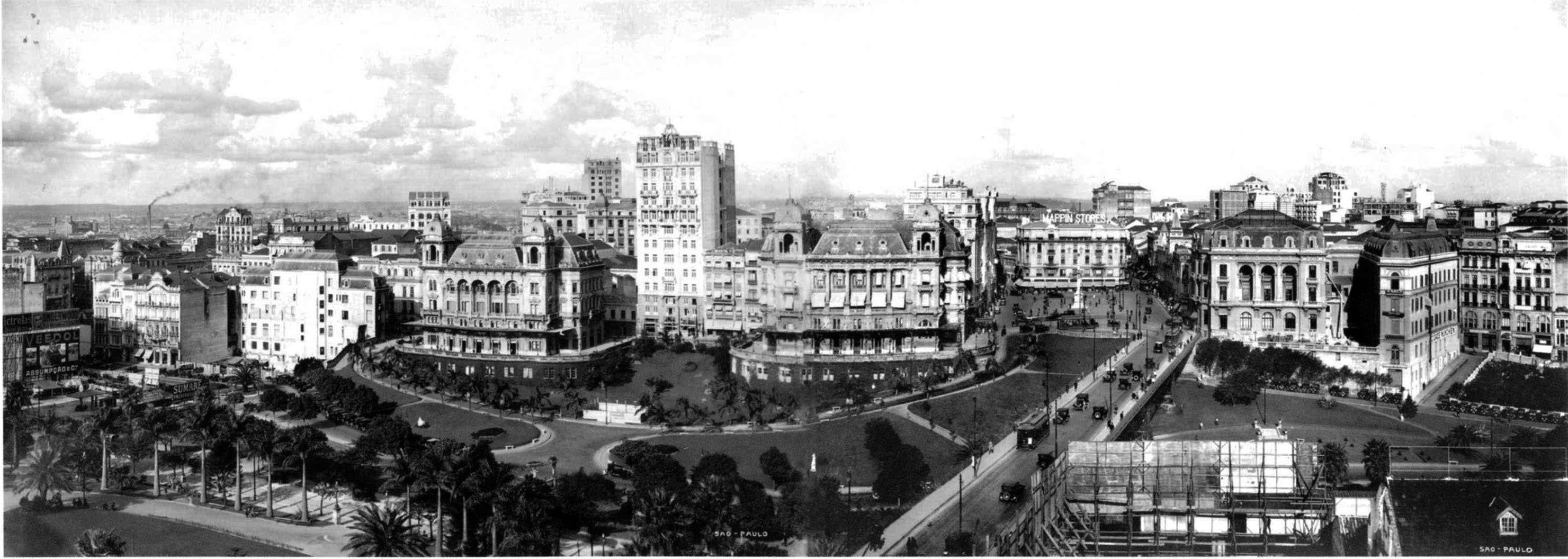
Anhangabaú Park in the second half of the 1920s

=== Expressway and remodeling ===
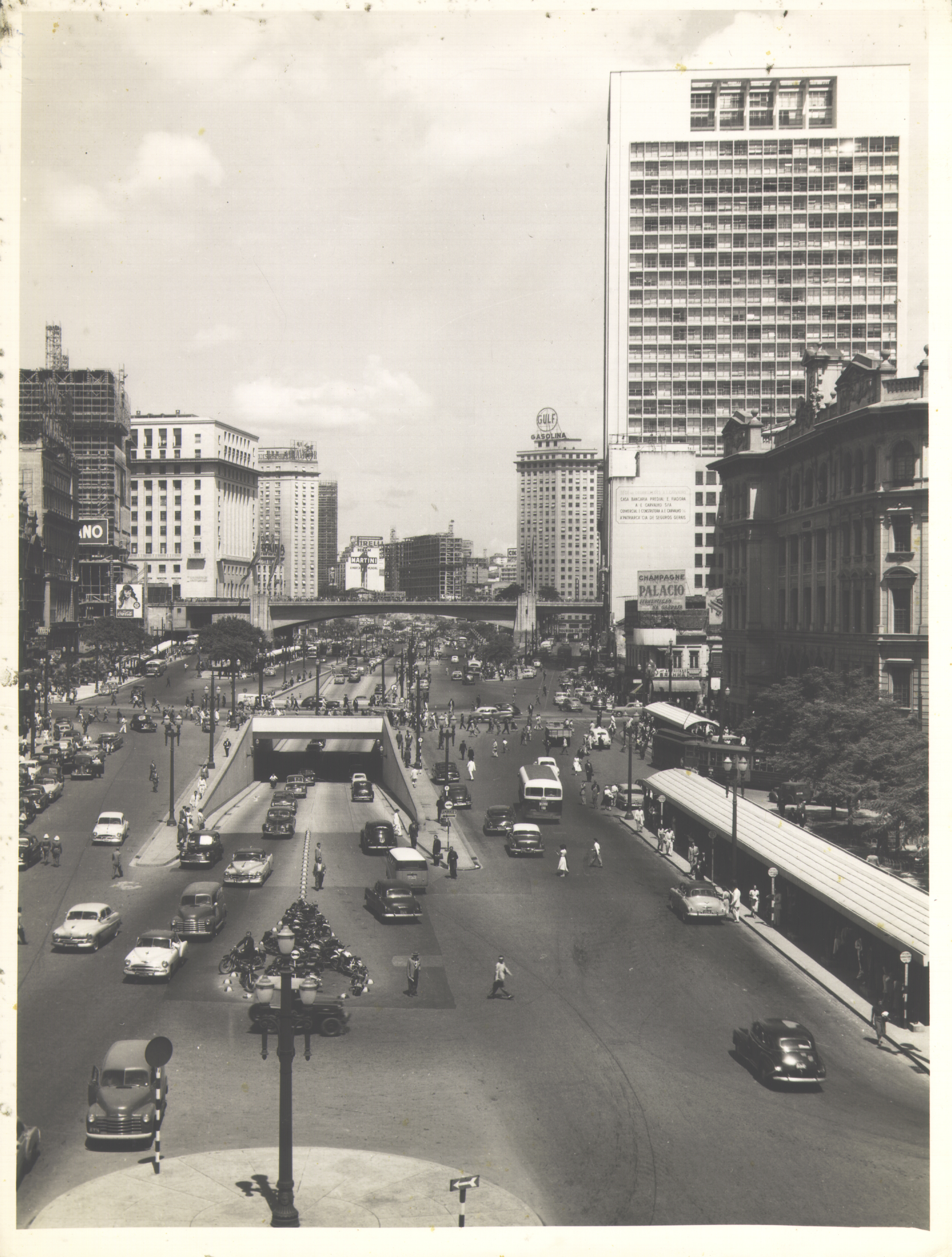
Expressway in the Vale do Anhangabaú, around the 1940s

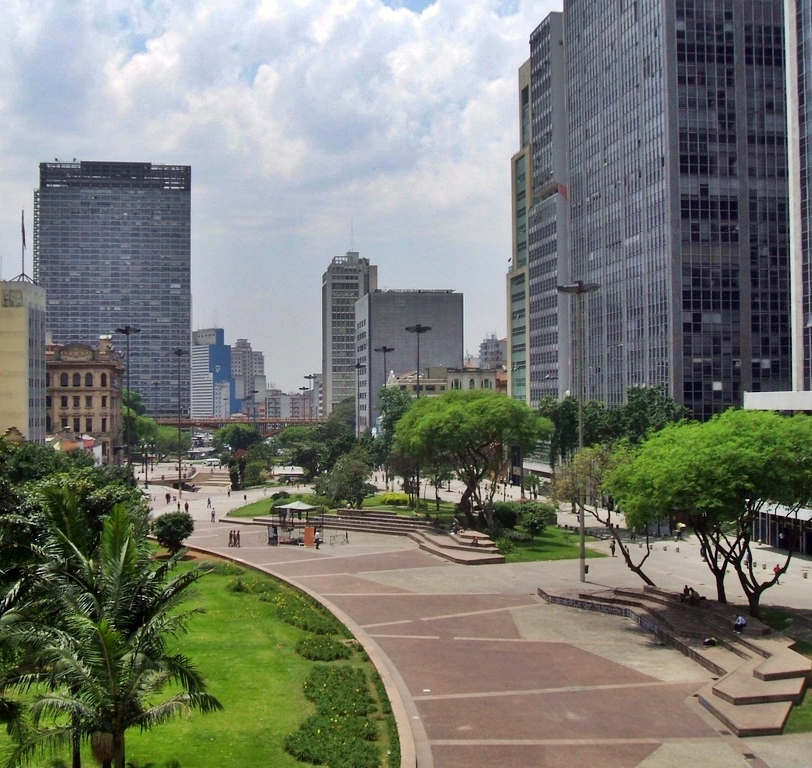
The Vale do Anhangabaú after the recreation of the park in the 1980s

In the late 1930s, the park was disbanded and gave way to an expressway. In the following decade, an underground connection was created between the Ramos de Azevedo and the Patriarca squares: the Prestes Maia Gallery, where the city's first escalators were installed. The intersection between Anhangabaú Avenue and Avenida São João gained a different height in 1951, with the construction of Buraco do Ademar, which remained there for 37 years, being subsequently replaced by two homonymous tunnels (Papa João Paulo II). The east side of the valley was gradually remodeled in the middle of the 20th century, with the demolition of the three Palacetes Prates, between 1935 and 1970, giving way to taller buildings.

In the early 1980s, the Municipality held a public tender for the remodeling of the region. The urban planners Jorge Wilheim and Rosa Grena Kliass were the winners, proposing a revitalization project that created a slab over the existing avenues on the site, at a height sufficient to connect the two sides of the Valley, with the car traffic falling below and recreating the green area between Viaduto do Chá and Viaduto Santa Ifigênia. The main focus was to transform the Valley into a large boulevard, to resume the original function of its construction at the beginning of the 20th century.

Since 2019, Vale do Anhangabaú has undergone a renovation, which was completed in 2022.

=== Political manifestations ===
In addition to its importance for the city's architectural history, the Anhangabaú Valley played a very influential role in the social history of São Paulo residents. A milestone in the history of the Valley was the event that became known as "Diretas Já". The movement happened spontaneously and had repercussions at the national level, as the people exercised their political power through the desire for direct elections to choose the president of Brazil.

Several rallies were held, the first being in the city of Abreu e Lima, Pernambuco, on March 31, 1983. In November of the same year, ten thousand people from São Paulo gathered for the first rally held in the Capital. After these first two rallies, the movement took on major proportions across the country.

After the two rallies, another one that gained repercussion took place on the 430th anniversary of São Paulo, on January 25, 1984. People organized themselves in a demonstration that had more than two hundred thousand people and occupied the region of Praça da Sé. Thus, in a matter of days, rallies began to be formed by large crowds and began to take place in squares and public places in cities such as Brasília, Rio de Janeiro and Belo Horizonte, expressing the desire to conquer their own citizenship.

The demonstration of April 16, 1984, however, is worth mentioning, as more than a million people gathered in Vale do Anhangabaú to continue the "Diretas Já!" demonstrations.

== See also ==
- Ramos de Azevedo Square
- Largo da Memória
- Post Office Palace
