= Viaduto do Chá =

Tea Viaduct Viaduto do Chá
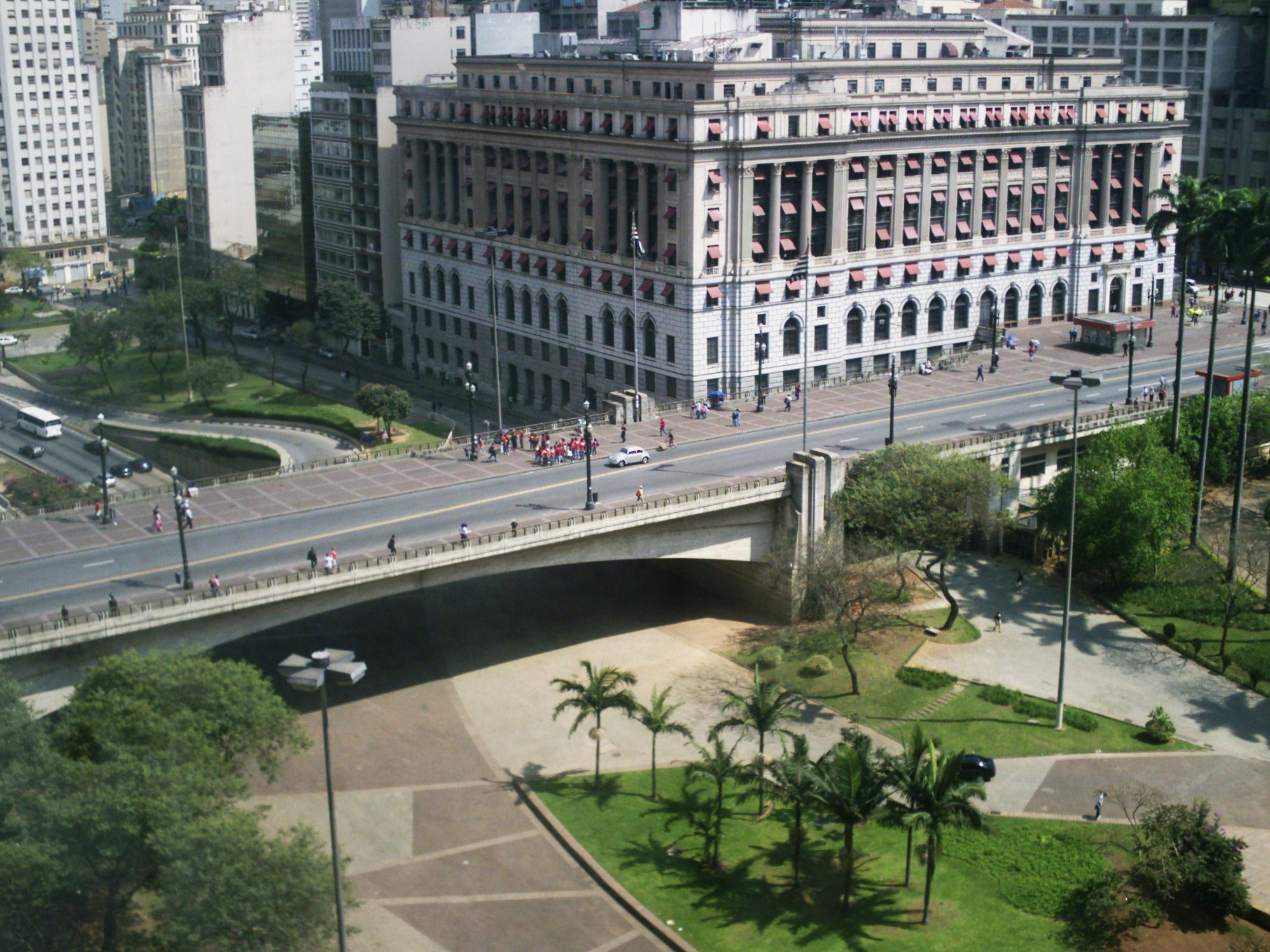
- Viaduto do Chá
- Coordinates: 23°32′48″S 46°38′16″W
- Crosses: Anhangabaú River
- Locale: São Paulo, Brazil

History
- Designer: Elisário Bahiana
- Construction start: 1888
- Construction end: 1892
- Rebuilt: 1938

Location
- Interactive map of Tea Viaduct

Viaduto do Chá ("Tea Viaduct") is a viaduct of São Paulo, Brazil. It was the first viaduct built in the city, and was instigated by Jules Martin, a French immigrant to the city. The 240-metre (790 ft) span crosses the Vale do Anhangabaú. Originally conceived in 1877, construction started in 1888 before being stopped one month later by a court case brought by local residents. Construction resumed in 1889, and the iron bridge was completed in 1892. The original viaduct was replaced in 1938 with a new concrete span. It often appears in TV interviews, as well as films and telenovelas set in São Paulo.

== Background ==
The viaduct is located in São Paulo, Brazil. It runs over the Anhangabaú River in the Vale do Anhangabaú valley, which separated two cities. On one side was the city centre of São Paulo, which ended at the Direita Street. On the other side was a neighbourhood called "Morro do Chá" (now Republica and Consolação), which lacked good transportation and policing. In order to get between the two, a long tram ride in a 'U'-shape around the valley was required, or to go down a steep descent to the Ponte do Lorena and cross there, returning up a slope on the other side near to Rua Xavier de Toledo. An extension of the city's tram network to Consolação was proposed in 1879, but was rejected by local residents as being good for the tram company but bad for local residents.

== Original viaduct ==
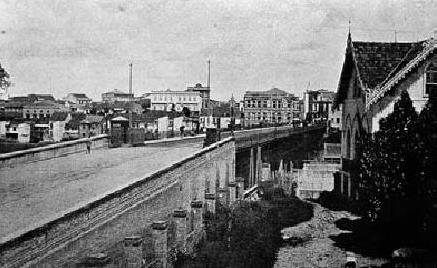
The original viaduct in 1895

The idea of building a viaduct came from Jules Martin, a French immigrant who was active in solving problems in the city, including installing the city's first gas engine, and drawing the first map of the province. He presented initial plans to connect Direita Street to Rua Barão de Itapetininga with a viaduct in 1877. Expanded plans for a boulevard were detailed in 1882, but by 1885 the plans had reverted to the viaduct, and Martin signed a contract to construct it and to form a company to do so. Planning started on 30 April 1888.

After one month the work on the viaduct stopped. Some of the residents were against the viaduct, including Francisco Xavier Pais de Barros, the Baron of Tatuí, and his wife, one of whose houses was slated for demolition to construct the viaduct. People in favour of the viaduct attacked his house with picks to force him to move. In May 1889 their court case was defeated, and the viaduct was constructed.

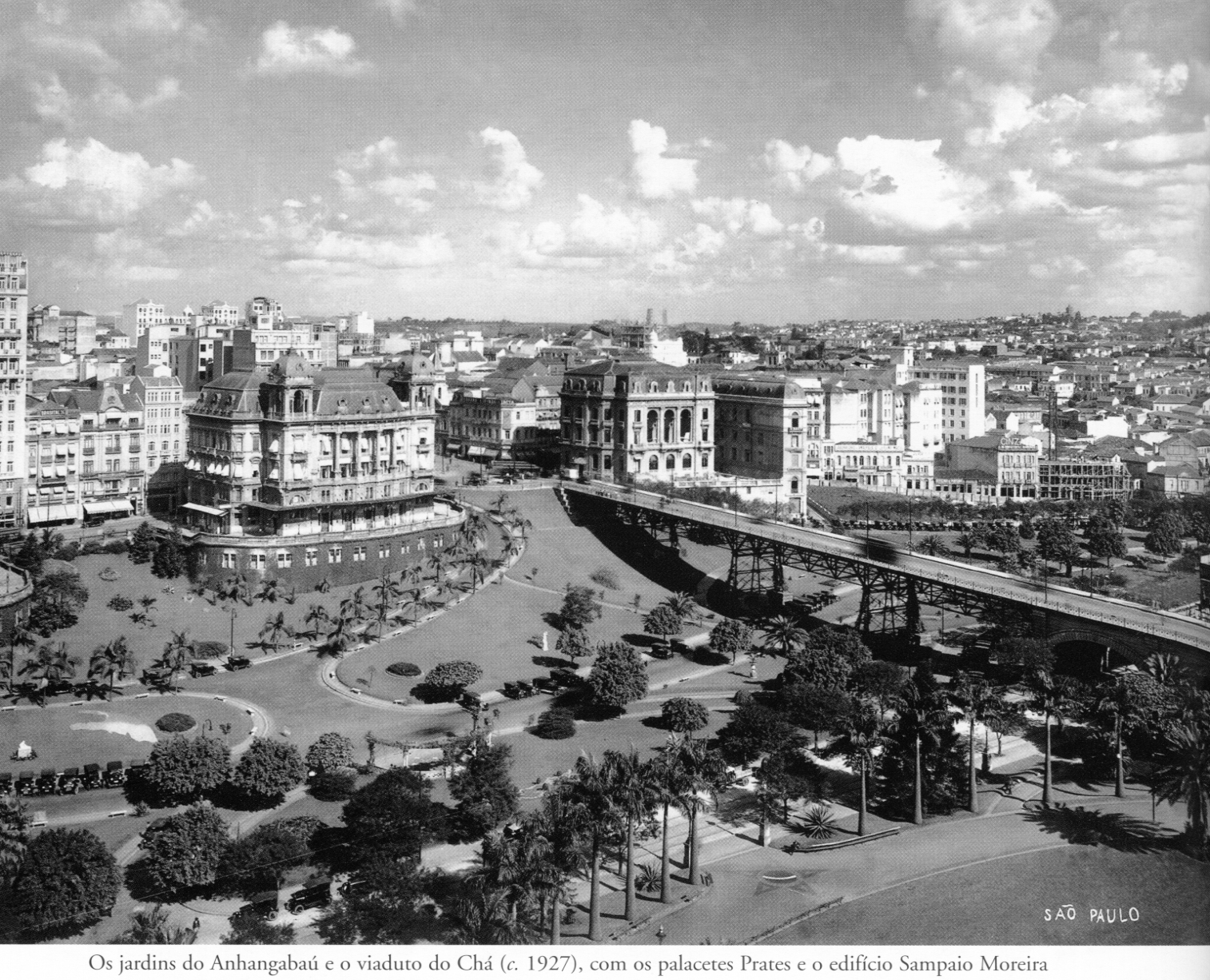
The viaduct in the 1920s

Construction restarted in 1889, initially run by the company Companhia Paulista do Chá. Due to delays, the company ran out of funding and almost went bankrupt; the project was transferred to Companhia de Ferro Carril de São Paulo, which completed the construction.

The 240-metre (790 ft)-long viaduct had a 180-metre (590 ft) structure made of iron imported from Germany, with a wooden floor. It was 14 metres (46 ft) wide, and carried pedestrians, horse-drawn trams, and other animal-drawn vehicles (but fixed-axle vehicles were banned). It was inaugurated on 6 November 1892. It was São Paulo's first viaduct, and was named after a nearby tea plantation called Morro do Chá.

It was originally operated as a gated toll road in order to cover the construction expenses. The toll to cross the bridge was 60 réis, or three vinténs, per person, which led to the nickname for the viaduct of "Viaduto dos Três Vinténs" (Three Vinténs Viaduct). For trams the toll was 200 réis. The toll was removed in 1896 when the viaduct was expropriated by the city council.

The bridge was strengthened and enlarged in 1902 when electric trams were introduced to the city, and the valley that it passed over was turned into a park in 1910. The Municipal Theatre was constructed nearby 1911 on the site of an earlier sawmill. In the 1920s cars started to cross the viaduct.

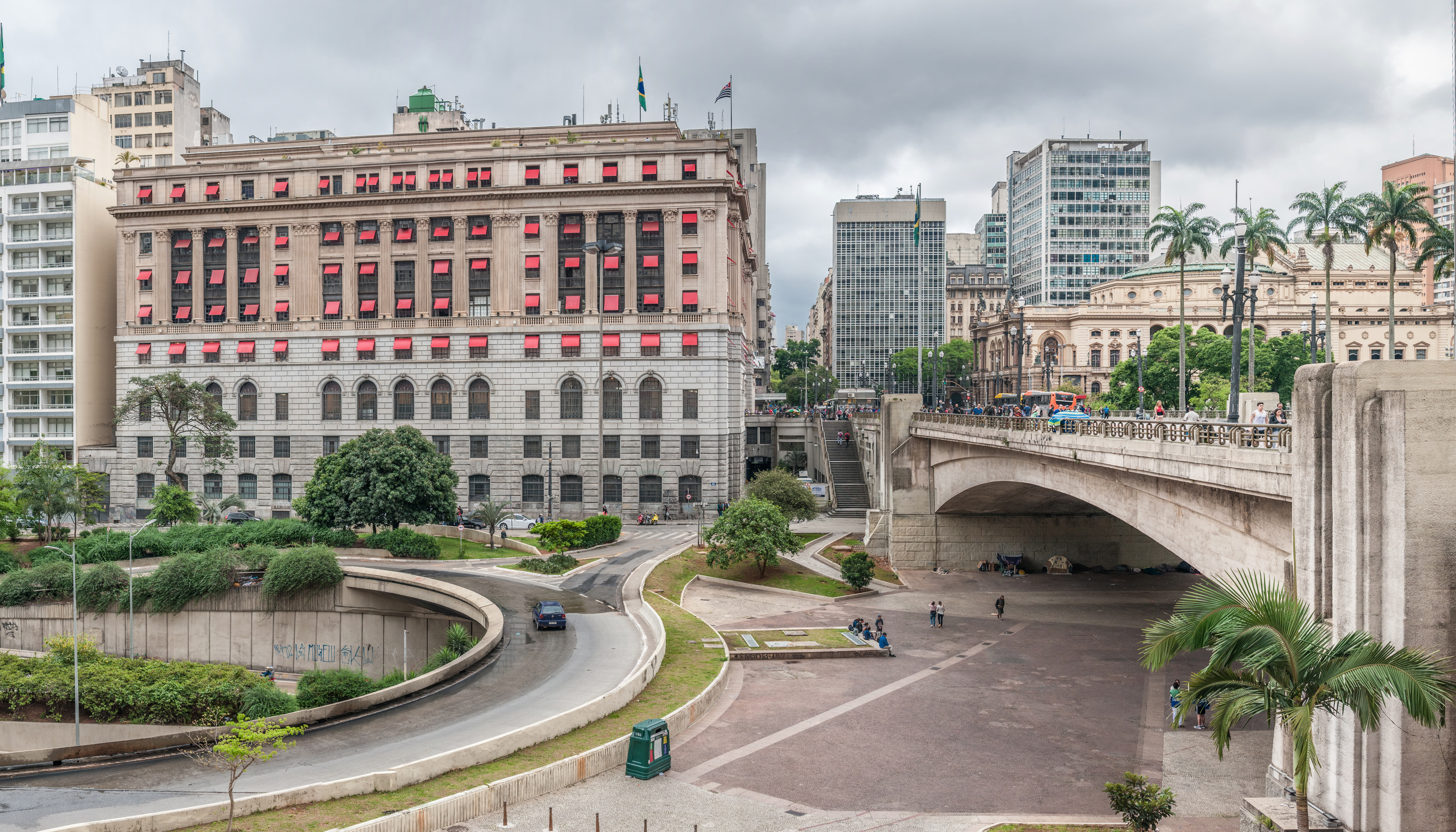
The Viaducto do Chá, on the right

== Replacement ==
By the 1930s, the original viaduct was too narrow to cope with the increase in traffic due to the growth of the city. A new double-width bridge made of reinforced concrete was constructed with a long arch supported by two pillars, adjacent to the original viaduct. It was designed by Elisário Bahiana, and was inaugurated on 23 February 1938; the original viaduct was demolished starting on 18 April 1938.

The park below the bridge changed substantially in the 1940s, with the river being taken underground and new roads constructed in the valley passing under the viaduct. The area changed significantly again in the 1990s, with a new road tunnel passing through the valley and a new park constructed on top of the tunnel. In 1992 the deck of the viaduct was refurbished. The viaduct is now adjacent to the Matarazzo Building, São Paulo's town hall

The bridge has been one of the icons of the city for many years, and is often used as a backdrop during TV interviews, and in movies and telenovelas set in São Paulo. The viaduct has often been used for suicides, a fact that has been featured in songs. In April 2010 the sidewalk of the viaduct was occupied by around 700 tents.
