= Ramos de Azevedo Square =

Square in São Paulo, Brazil

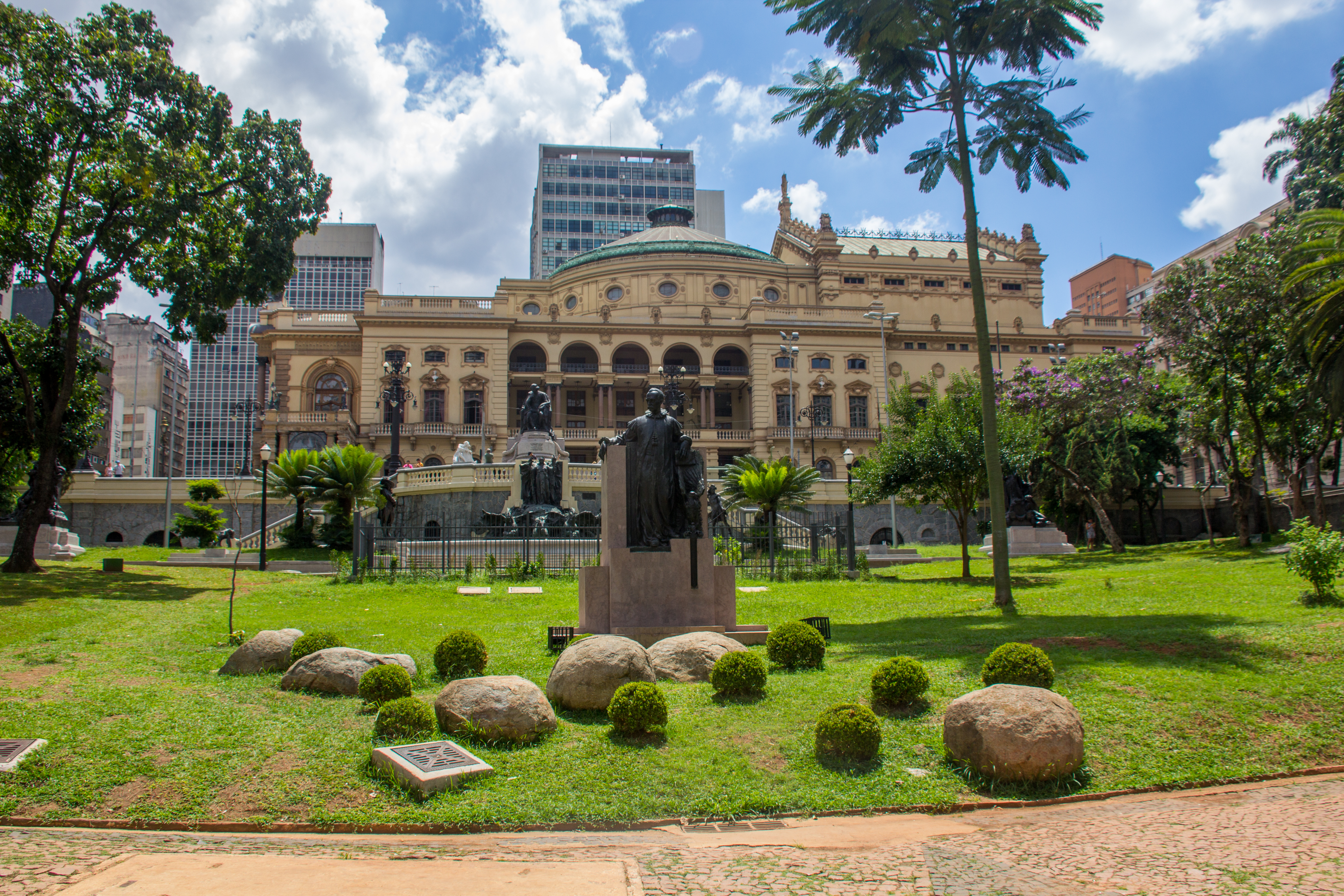
- Ramos de Azevedo Square.

- Location within São Paulo Location within Brazil
- Area: 12,000 m^{2} (130,000 sq ft)
- Location: São Paulo, São Paulo; Brazil
- Coordinates: 23°32′45″S 46°38′16″W

Construction
- Inauguration: 1928; 98 years ago

The Ramos de Azevedo Square (Portuguese: Praça Ramos de Azevedo) is located in the República district, in the center of the Brazilian city of São Paulo, and is famous for being home to the Municipal Theater. It was created in 1911, after the theater's inauguration, under the name Esplanada do Theatro. It was renamed in 1928, after the death of the architect Ramos de Azevedo.

The square, located in the space between Conselheiro Crispiniano Street and Formosa Street, under the Viaduto do Chá and next to the Alexandre Mackenzie Building, forms a well-known postcard of the city.

== History ==
Before the Municipal Theater was built, the area was known as Morro do Chá, where German immigrant Gustav Sydow's sawmill was located. After the site was chosen, it was expropriated by the City Council in 1903 and, in 1911, the square and the theater were inaugurated. The work was part of a series of projects to urbanize the Anhangabaú Valley, which used to accommodated low-income housing that were demolished to allow for the renovation. The place only became known as Ramos de Azevedo Square in 1928, in honor of the architect who built the Municipal Theater.

=== Design of the square ===
The current site of the square was part of the Chácara do Chá lands that belonged to José Joaquim dos Santos Silva, the Baron of Itapetininga, who grew black tea in the area. In 1855, the government demanded that a road be opened between Largo da Memória and São João Street, which was done with the construction of Formosa Street. On April 21, 1863, the expropriation of other plots was authorized by the São Paulo City Council, which decided to reserve the site for the opening of Coronel Xavier de Toledo, Conselheiro Crispiniano, Barão de Itapetininga and 24 de Maio streets. These routes were officially handed over between 1875 and 1876. On November 6, 1892, the Viaduto do Chá, the first in the city of São Paulo, was inaugurated.

From 1895 onwards, City Hall managers began to discuss the possibility of building a large theater in the city of São Paulo; the site, then known as Morro do Chá was chosen.

The sculpture built there, called the Monument to Carlos Gomes, is a gift from the Italian community of São Paulo in honor of the great Brazilian composer of operas - whose most important characters illustrate the statues and allegories of the monument - and was completed in 1922 by the Italian sculptor Luigi Brizzolara. The complex also became known as the Fountain of Wishes in 1957.

=== Construction of the Municipal Theater of São Paulo ===
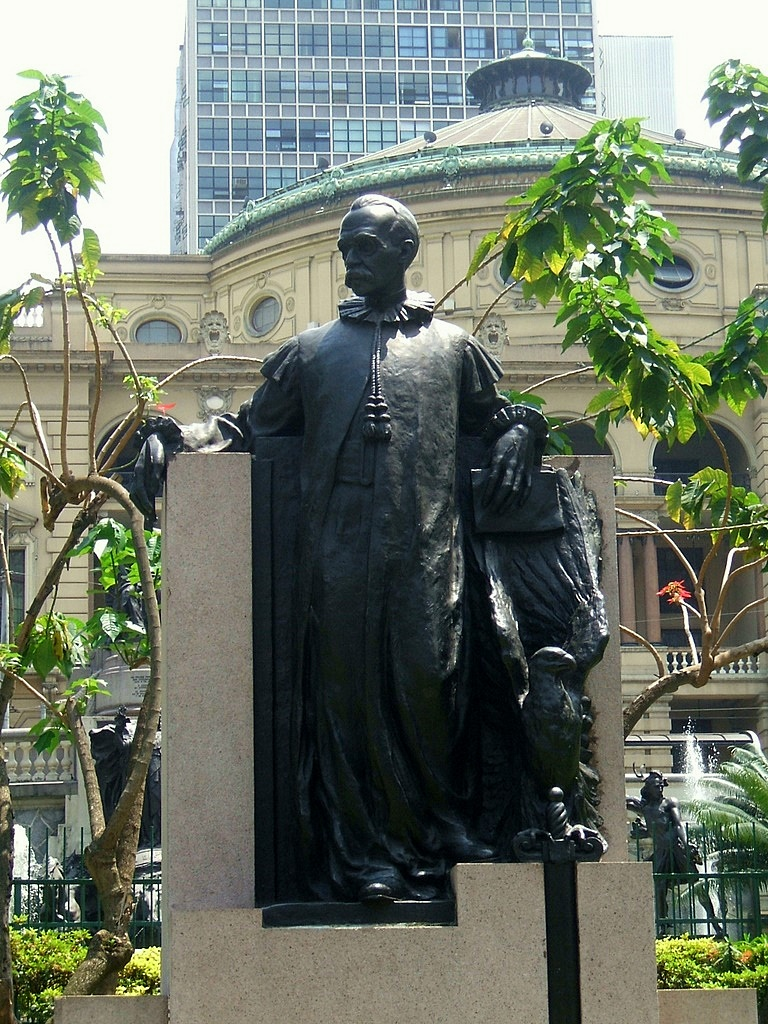
Tribute to Ruy Barbosa by the XI de Agosto Academic Center of the USP Law School.

Construction of the Municipal Theater began on June 16, 1903. The work was designed by Italian architects Domiziano Rossi and Cláudio Rossi, who worked for the office of Brazilian architect Francisco de Paula Ramos de Azevedo. On October 11, 1911, after eight years of construction, the venue was officially inaugurated. The area also included the São José Theater, which had been operating since 1907, but was demolished in 1924. In order to improve access to the area, City Hall technicians decided to carry out work in the zone in front of the theater.

The project chosen was created by Joseph Antoine Bouvard, who planned to build a garden area that would extend from Líbero Badaró to Conselheiro Crispiniano and include the area around the theater. After the landscaping of the area on the slope of Morro do Chá, later named Ramos de Azevedo Square, the site, with curved boulevards and exquisite landscaping, became a form of anteroom for the theater, creating a space that enhanced one of the city's most important artistic spaces.

=== Degradation and restoration ===
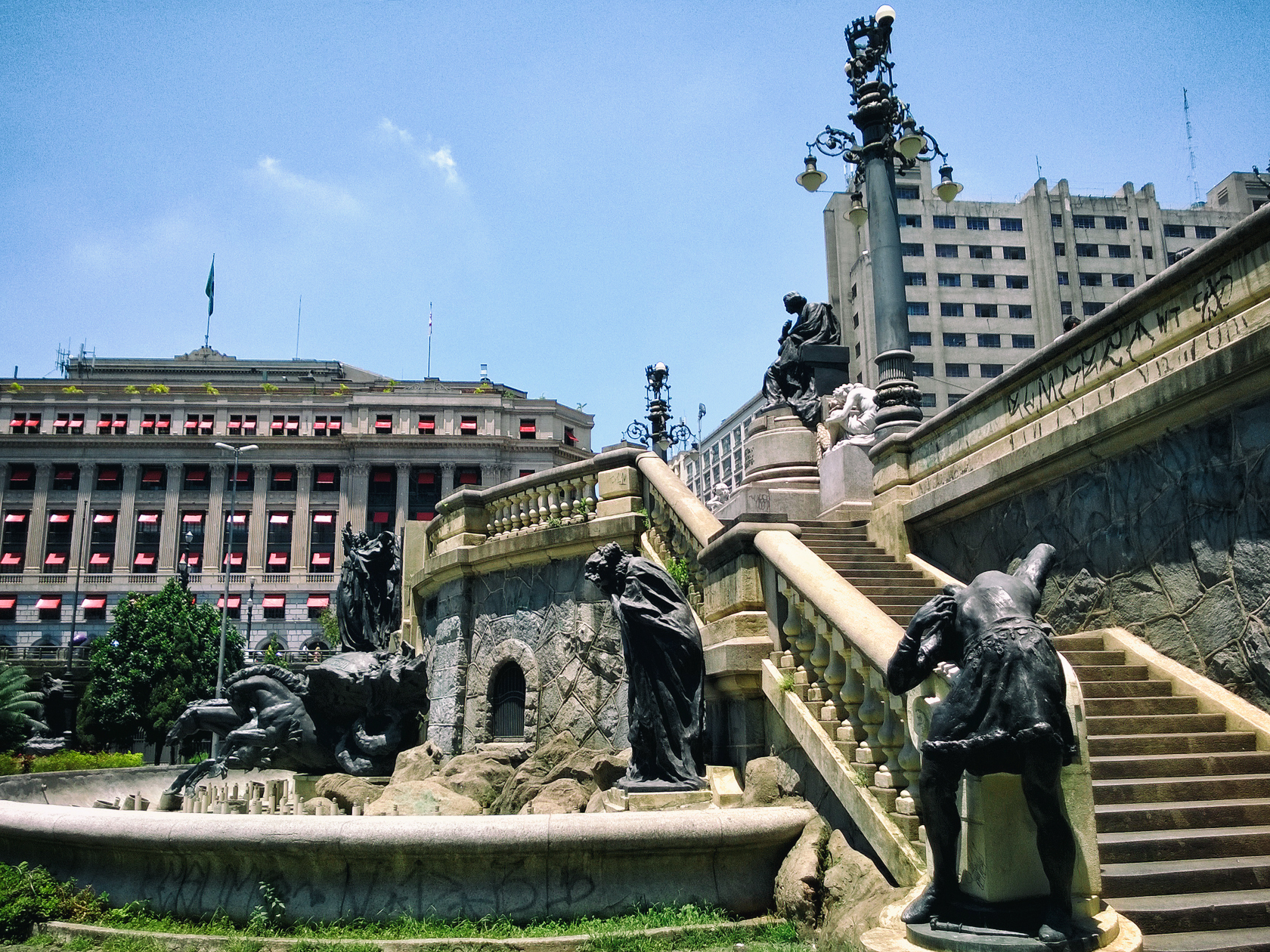
The square before its renovation in 2017.

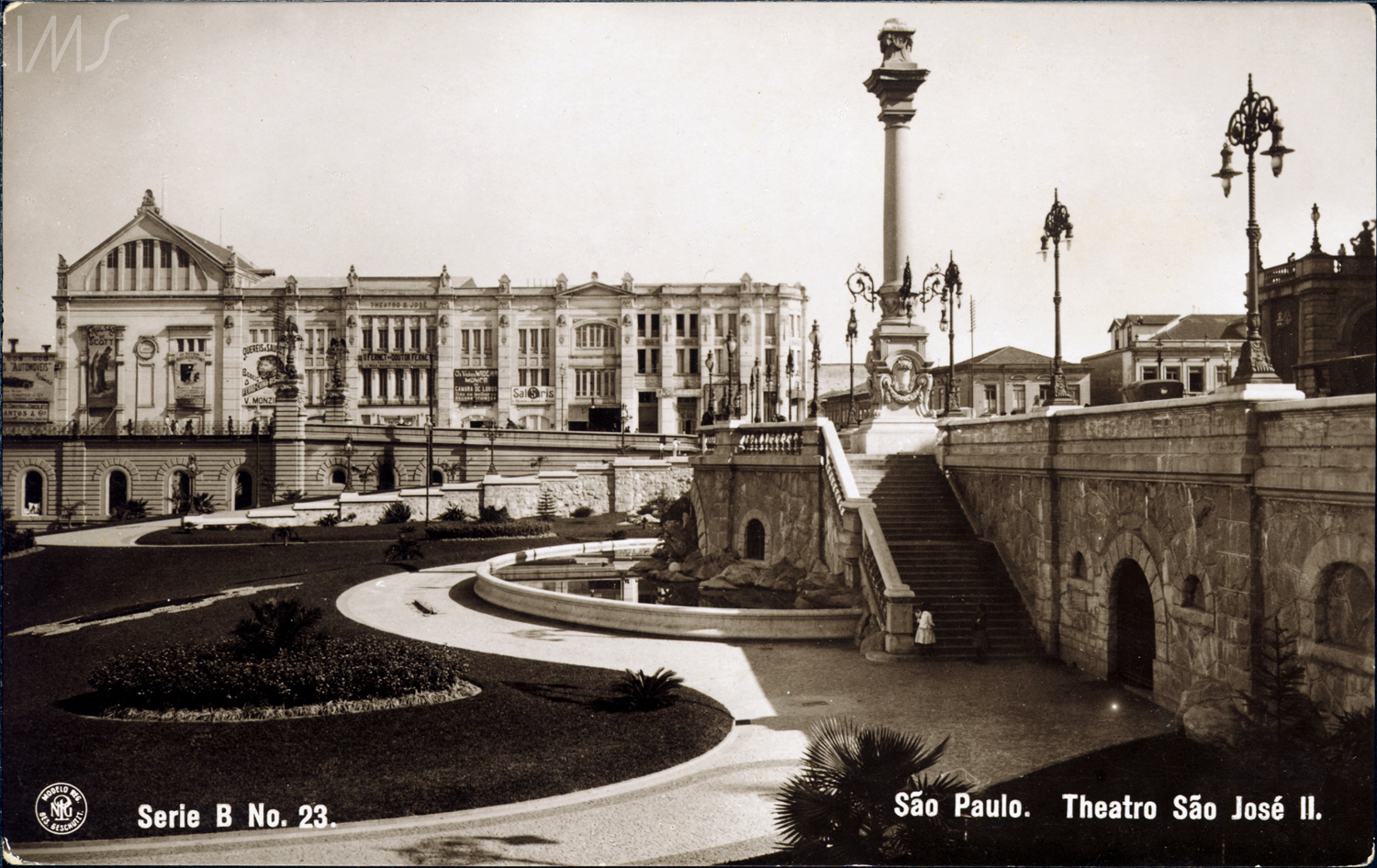
The square in 1910, with the São José Theater in the background.

Over the years, the monuments in Ramos de Azevedo Square, including the Fountain of Wishes and the statue of Carlos Gomes, have been graffitied and deteriorated. Many of the sculptures were damaged by vandals, who sprayed paint on the pieces and caused them to lose their original textures. The site, which is just a few meters from the headquarters of the São Paulo City Hall, has been neglected by the government. The group of works in homage to Carlos Gomes was used as a shelter by homeless people and pedestrians in the area complained about the strong smell of urine. The square's lampposts and signposts have also been the target of vandalism, with stickers and other signs of depredation.

On December 16, 2017, João Doria Junior's administration finished renovating the square, which took seven months and was funded by a partnership between Italian-Brazilian businessmen and the Italian consulate in the city. The square was given a new floor, lighting, painting, gardening and the 12 bronze and marble statues surrounding the fountain were restored.

== Architectural features ==
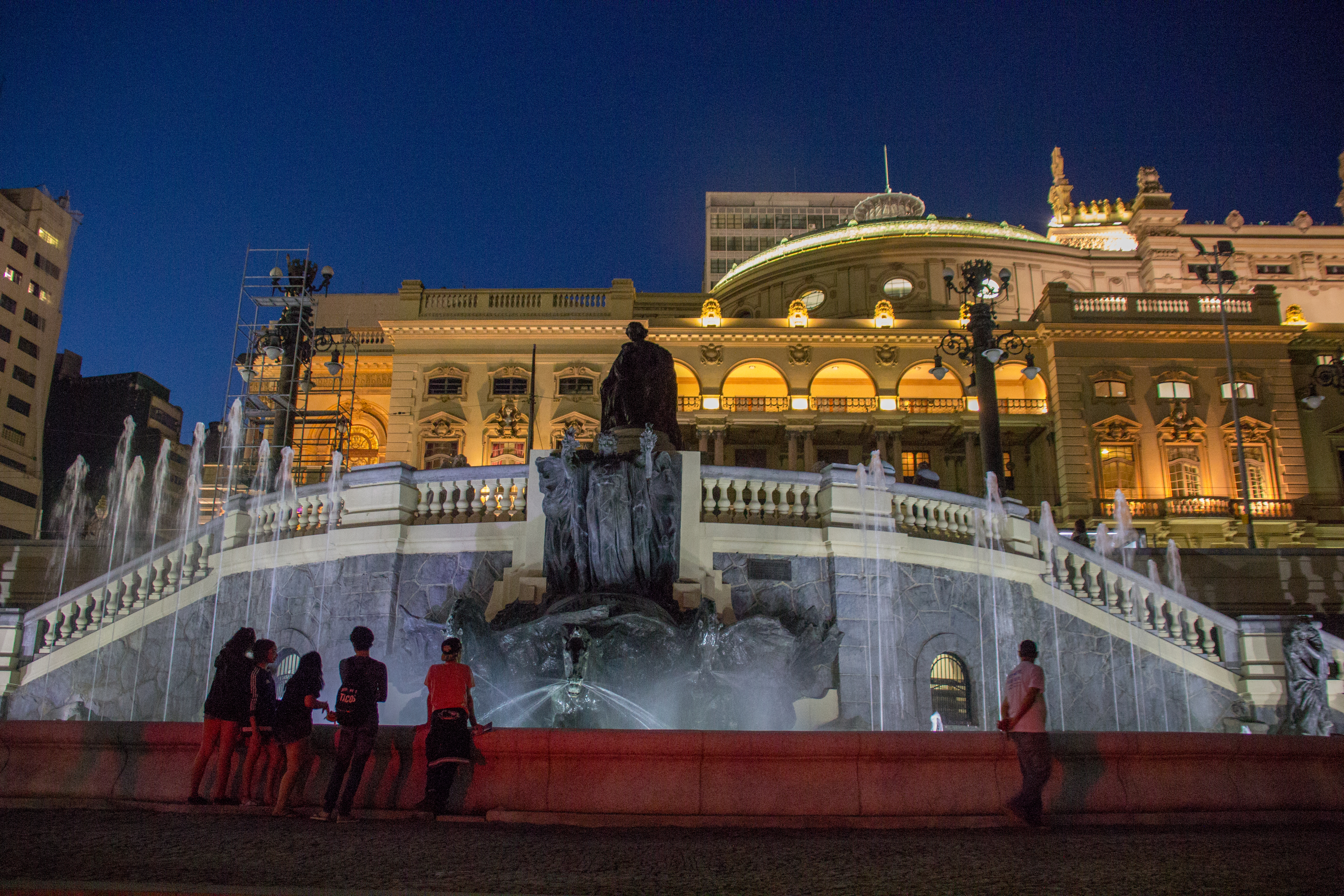
Fountain of Wishes at night.

In 1922, as part of the celebrations for the centenary of Brazil's independence, the Italian community living in São Paulo inaugurated a set of sculptures in the square in front of the Municipal Theater in honor of the Brazilian opera composer Carlos Gomes. The Monument to Carlos Gomes, as it is known, by the Italian sculptor Luigi Brizzolara, was placed in the fountain that already existed there since the inauguration of the Municipal Theater in 1911. The 12 pieces, made of marble, bronze and granite and executed in Italy by the Camiani e Guastini Fonderia Artística in Bronzo workshop, represent music, poetry and some of the main characters from the artist's songs.

At the top, in bronze, there are allegories to Music and Poetry, sculpted in Carrara marble. Below, there is a sculptural group called Glory, formed by the female figure of the Republic on a sphere with the inscription "Order and Progress", led by a pair of three winged horses. There is also the Condor sculpture, which depicts a male figure leaning over the railing of the staircase leading to the Anhangabaú Valley and is inspired by the main character in the opera of the same name. According to tradition, touching the middle finger of the sculpture's left hand is good luck, which is the reason why there is more damage in this area. In 1957, the ensemble became known as the Fountain of Wishes.

== Historical and cultural significance ==
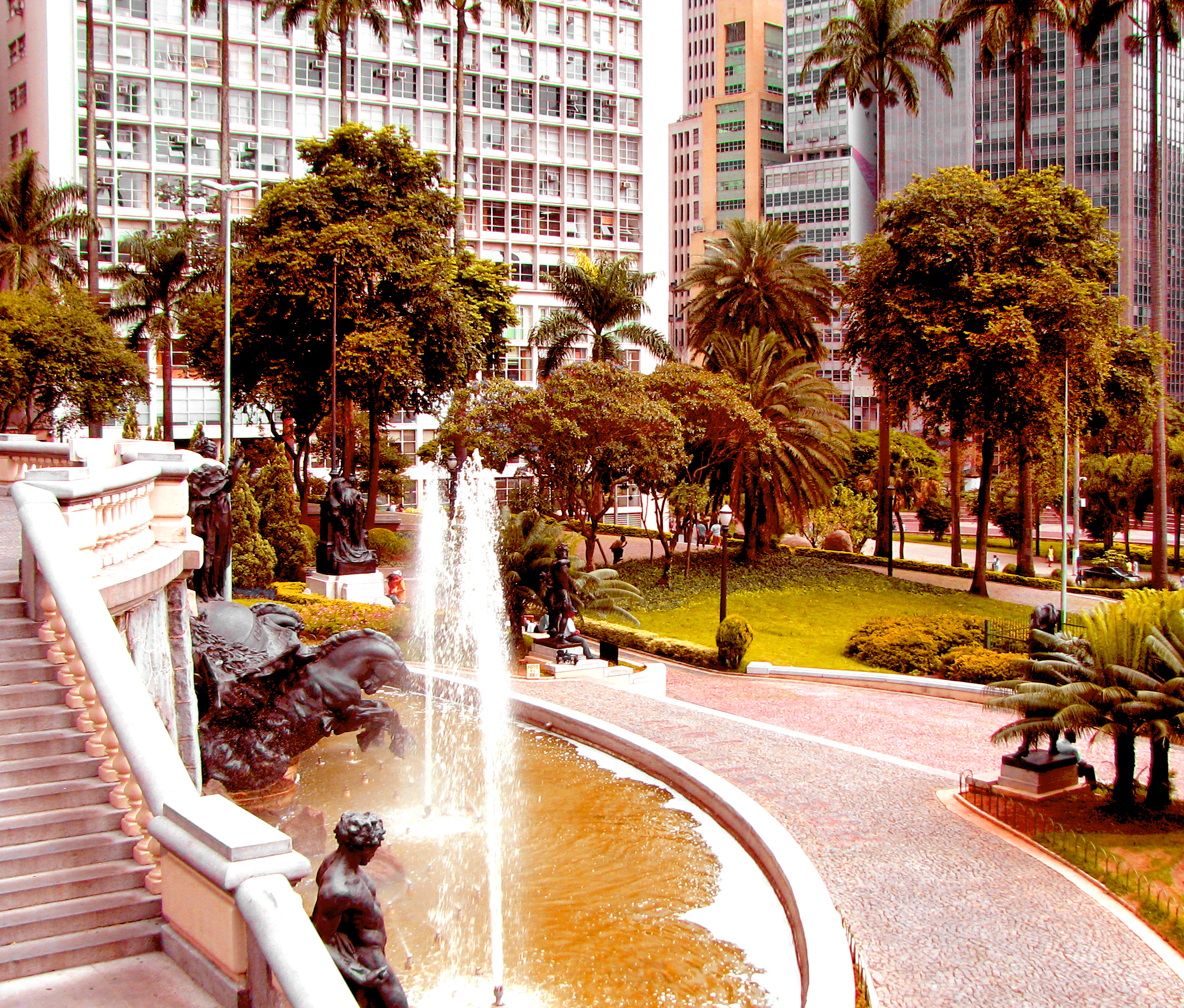
The square seen from the Municipal Theater in 2008.

The square, although no longer with its original ambience, still forms a free and wide space along with Municipal Theater. On the other hand, the site is benefited by an architectural complex that surrounds it: the Viaduto do Chá, the former Mappin buildings, the Alexandre Mackenzie, the former Esplanada Hotel and its neighbor, the CBI-Esplanada.

The square still retains its function as the esplanade of the Municipal Theater, since its landscape composition is in line with the architectural lines of the building and the two form an inseparable urban ensemble that extends towards Anhangabaú Valley. In 1986, the square was listed as a historical heritage site by the Municipal Council for the Preservation of the Historical, Cultural and Environmental Heritage of the City of São Paulo - CONPRESP. The decision was based on the landscape and environmental significance assumed by the Anhangabaú Valley throughout the history of the city of São Paulo and considering the historical-architectural, environmental and emotional value of several properties located in the Anhangabaú Valley area and its surroundings. Ramos de Azevedo Square is classified as an asset of exceptional historical, architectural or landscape interest. The declaration of heritage determines its integral preservation and the conservation of its external features.

It also played an important role in shaping the history of the city of São Paulo, as it was an important stage for protests in the 60s and 70s.

== See also ==
- Tourism in the city of São Paulo
- Historic Center of São Paulo
- Central Zone of São Paulo
