= Alexandre Mackenzie Building =

- Edifício Alexandre Mackenzie
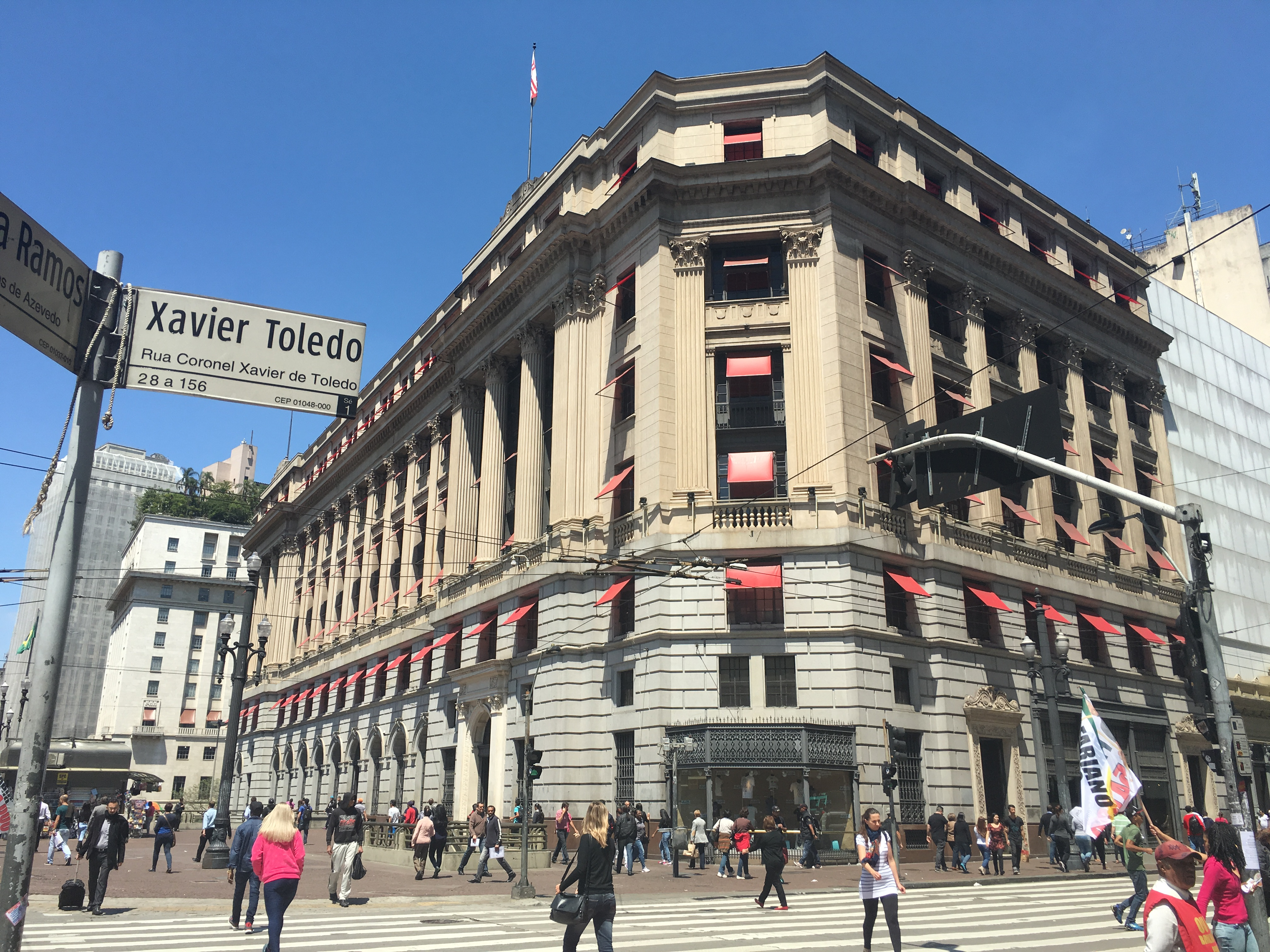
- Facade of the Alexandre Mackenzie Building

- Location within São Paulo Alexandre Mackenzie Building (Brazil)
- Alternative names: Light Building

General information
- Location: São Paulo, São Paulo; Brazil
- Coordinates: 23°32′48″S 46°38′19″W
- Construction started: 1926
- Inaugurated: 1929
- Renovated: 1997
- Owner: São Paulo Tramway, Light and Power Company

Height
- Height: 50 m (160 ft)

Technical details
- Floor count: 9
- Floor area: 29.720 m²

Design and construction
- Architects: Preston & Curtis
- Engineer: Severo, Villares & Cia. Ltda.

The Alexandre Mackenzie Building (Portuguese: Edifício Alexandre Mackenzie), also known as the Light Building (Prédio da Light), is a construction located in the central area of the city of São Paulo, between the intersection of Coronel Xavier de Toledo Street and the Viaduto do Chá, designed by the Americans Preston and Curtis and executed by Severo, Villares & Cia. Ltda. It was the headquarters of the São Paulo Tramway, Light and Power Company and later of the former state-owned Eletropaulo. It was completed in 1929 and extended in 1941. Since 1999, after careful restoration, it houses Shopping Light.

== Context ==
In 1899, the São Paulo Tramway, Light and Power Company set up in rented rooms in a building on São Bento Street. Its constant growth required it to move to increasingly large areas, often in different parts of the city. There were a total of seven offices in São Paulo, which made central administration difficult. As a result, the company acquired the São José Theater, in Coronel Xavier de Toledo Street, to be used as its new headquarters. The work was completed in April 1929.

In 1941, the building was extended to cover an area of 29,720 m². Since its construction, it has acquired great prominence, both for its privileged position next to the Anhangabaú Valley and for the history of the company that created it. Today, the building is state property, as it was the headquarters of the former state company Eletropaulo. In 1999, after the company's privatization process and the transfer of its administrative areas in the 1980s, the facility became a commercial and cultural center.

== History ==
=== Construction ===
The Alexandre Mackenzie Building was originally built to house the headquarters of the Canadian company São Paulo Tramway, Light and Power. It was named after the company's director at the time, who requested the design of the building. The North American architects Preston and Curtis were responsible for the project and the building was executed by Severo, Villares & Cia. Ltda., the firm of engineer and architect Ramos de Azevedo, between 1926 and 1929.

In September 1983, Luiz Antonio de Assis Carvalho, Eletropaulo's communications superintendent, submitted a landmark request to the Council for the Defense of Historical, Archaeological, Artistic and Tourist Heritage (Condephaat). In October 1984, the building was officially listed as a monument of architectural interest by Jorge da Cunha Lima, Secretary of Culture at the time, and inscribed in the Livro do Tombo in January 1987.

=== National heritage ===
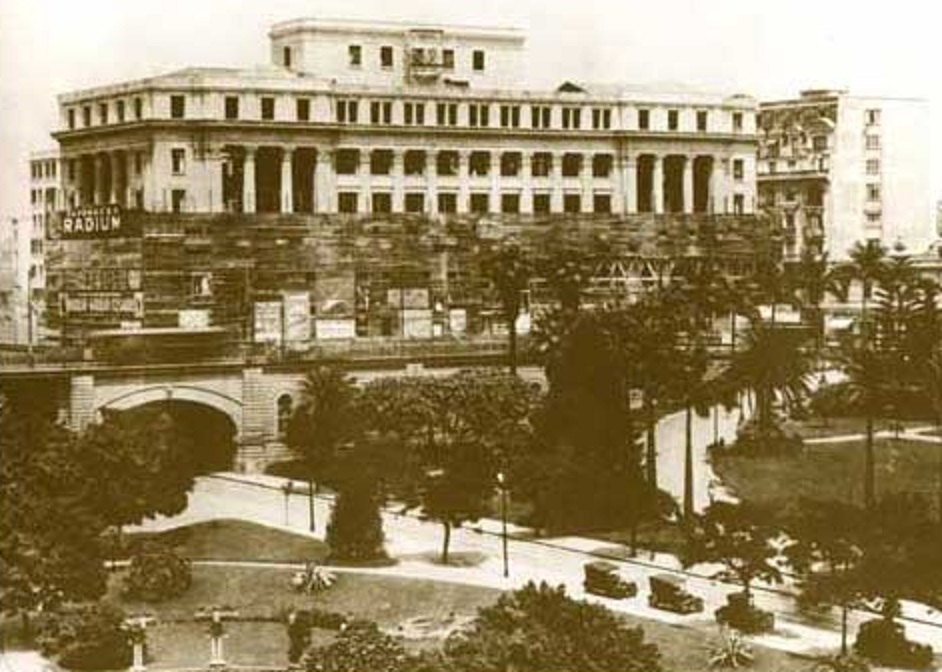
Alexandre Mackenzie Building at the end of construction in 1929

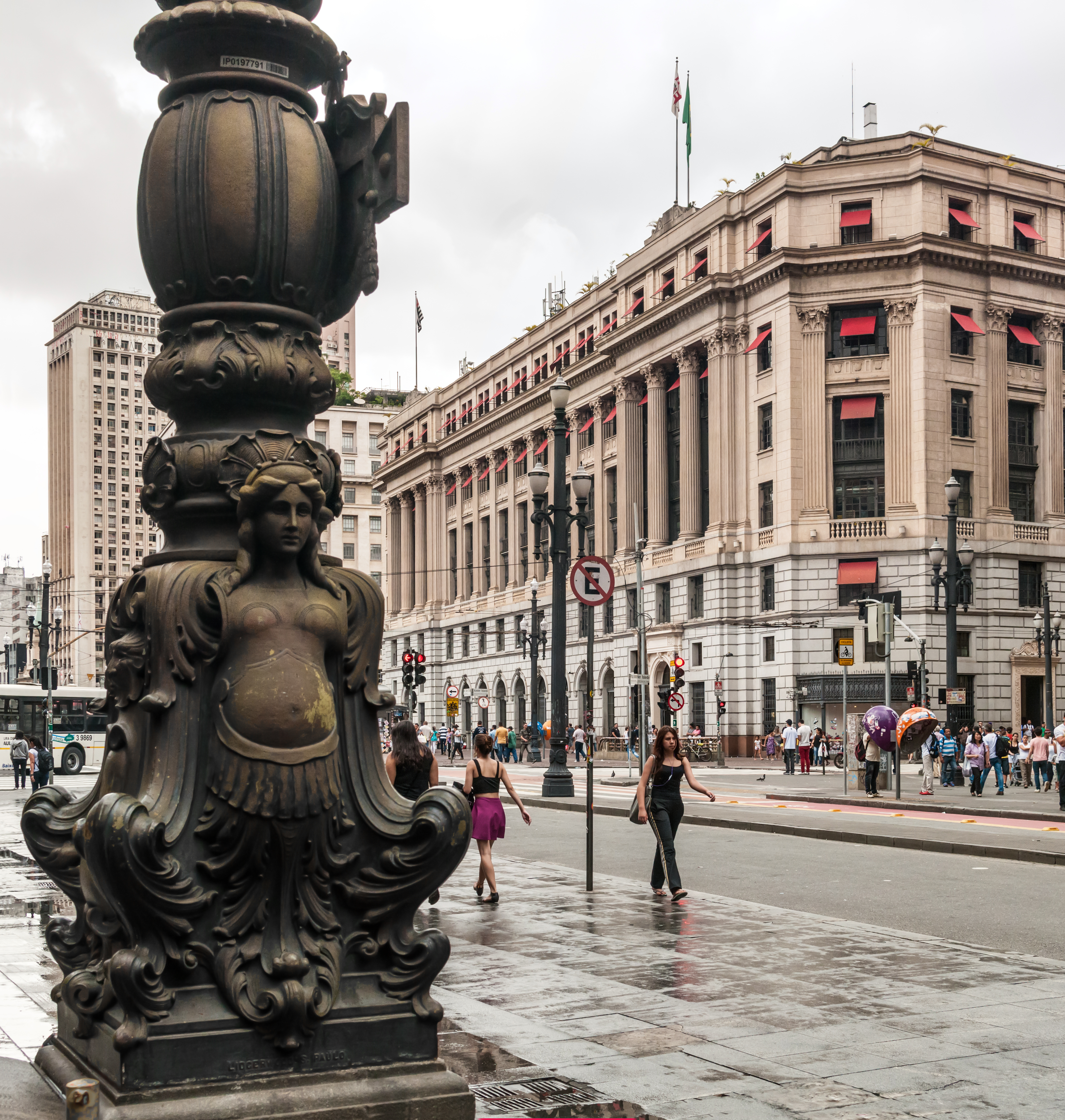
Alexandre Mackenzie Building, in the background, seen from the Municipal Theater of São Paulo

The interest in protecting the building arose because of possible negotiations on the real estate market. The structure is one of São Paulo's most outstanding urban environmental heritage sites, given its position in the Anhangabaú Valley. Together with the former Banespa headquarters (Altino Arantes Building), the São Paulo City Hall headquarters (Matarazzo Building) and the Viaduto do Chá, it forms the characteristic ensemble of the city's central area. The gardens of the Municipal Theater, with its staircase and imposing structure, and the Ramos de Azevedo Square, named after the famous engineer and architect, are located in the surrounding region.

=== Shopping Light ===
Since 1999, the building houses Shopping Light, the result of a consortium with the Birmann Fund, which won a 50-year concession for the property. In 1997, Eletropaulo still occupied part of the premises when the renovations were carried out. One of the contractors for the shopping center project was CEI Empreendimentos, which invested an estimated R$50 million. The mall's target audience is the B and C classes, due to the huge circulation of people through the Anhangabaú Valley during business hours and lunchtime. It is estimated that around one million people pass through the Viaduto do Chá every day.

The current mall has more than 130 stores in operation and receives around 35,000 people a day. The inauguration of the development included a fireworks show, a photographic exhibition and film projections of the center of São Paulo.

== Features ==
The Alexandre Mackenzie Building is one of São Paulo's great architectural landmarks and one of the icons of the eclectic style in the city center. All of the original metalwork and mercenaries in the structure were designed by the São Paulo School of Arts and Crafts during its construction. Today, the building blends modern elements with older ones, such as modern escalators, elevators from the 1920s, marble staircases and replicas of benches and garbage cans similar to those in the Luz Station. Shopping Light was the first mall in Brazil to use architectural recycling techniques in its structure and facade.

In the 1990s, the restoration work was carried out by architect Carlos Faggin, a professor of architectural history at USP. The facades had to be washed due to graffiti and the effects of time. Technology was key to the process, with laboratory analysis making it possible to identify the original features of the building, which were remolded. Frames, ceramics, stained glass and wooden masonry were all restored and adapted to the 1920s. The 50-meter-high edifice now has nine floors, with the last one being a cultural center, and two underground floors.

== Historical and cultural significance ==
=== Anhangabaú Valley ===
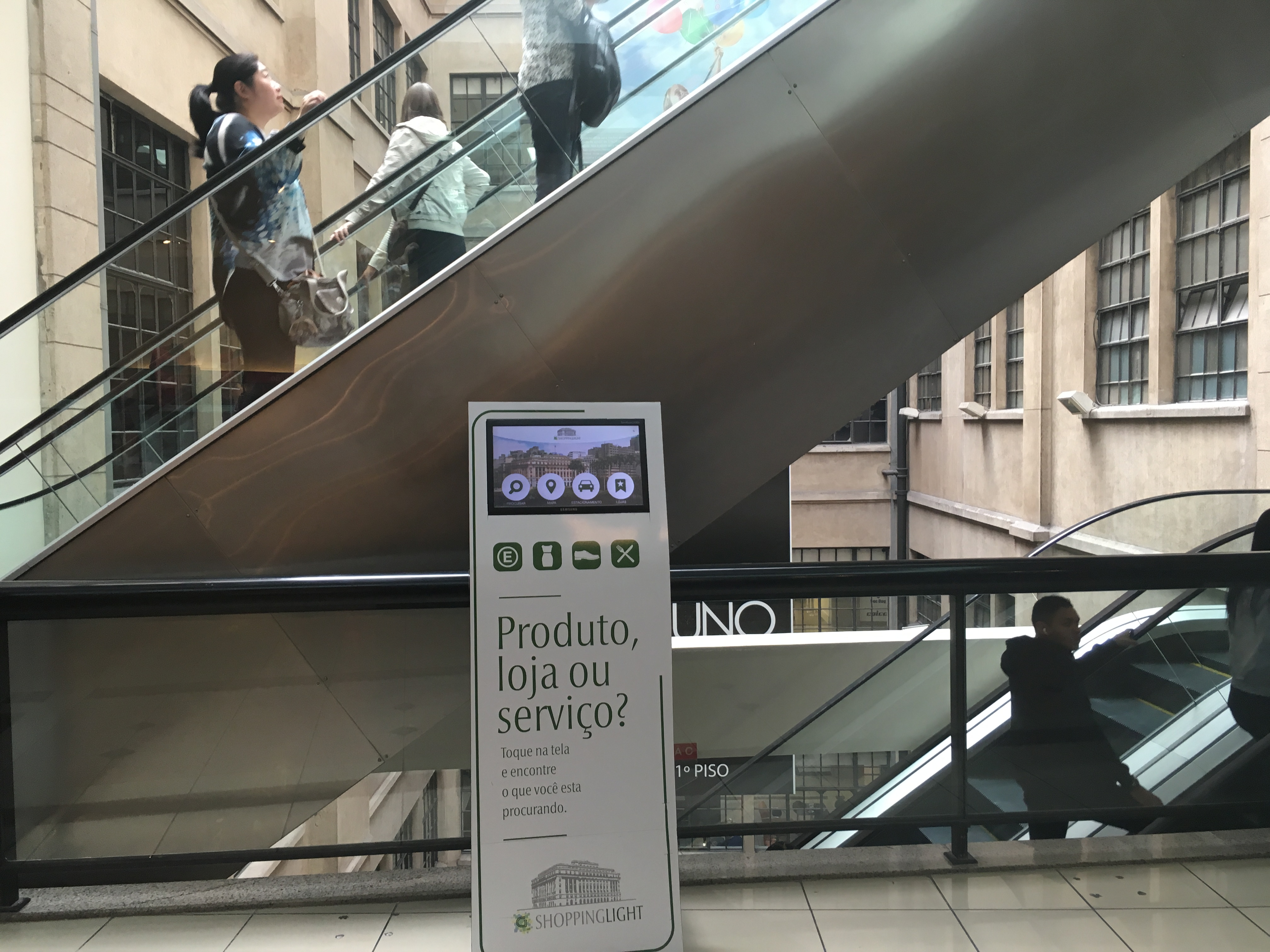
Shopping Light information booth on the third floor

In the book História e Tradições da Cidade de São Paulo, Ernani da Silva Bruno describes the Anhangabaú region as the "center of the city in its most original and characteristic form". The Viaduto do Chá was the first viaduct in the city of São Paulo that connected the banks of the old Anhangabaú River and brought great improvements to the region, both economically and socially. Over the years, for sanitary reasons, the river was channeled and gave rise to the current valley, which is extremely important for the city as it preserves historical and social elements, such as the Municipal Theater of São Paulo, the former Esplanada Hotel (Ermírio de Moraes Building), the Matarazzo Building and the Alexandre Mackenzie Building, where the São José Theater used to be.

=== The São Paulo Tramway, Light and Power Company ===
The building's architectural features and historical presence give the Anhangabaú Valley environmental ensemble a remarkable expression, described as "the most remarkable in the city center" by engineer Raphael Gendler. Its construction was commissioned by the director of the São Paulo Tramway, Light and Power, a company that had a monopoly on electrical services and was ironically called "Light and Too Much Power". In 1910, 30% of the total energy consumed by São Paulo was supplied by the firm, while in the 1950s, this share jumped to 52%. During the military dictatorship, private companies in the electricity sector went through a process of nationalization. Throughout the country, the government took control of Light. In São Paulo, it became the state-owned Eletropaulo. In 1997, the company was split up and went through a new privatization process, which led to Eletropaulo leaving the building.

== Current status ==
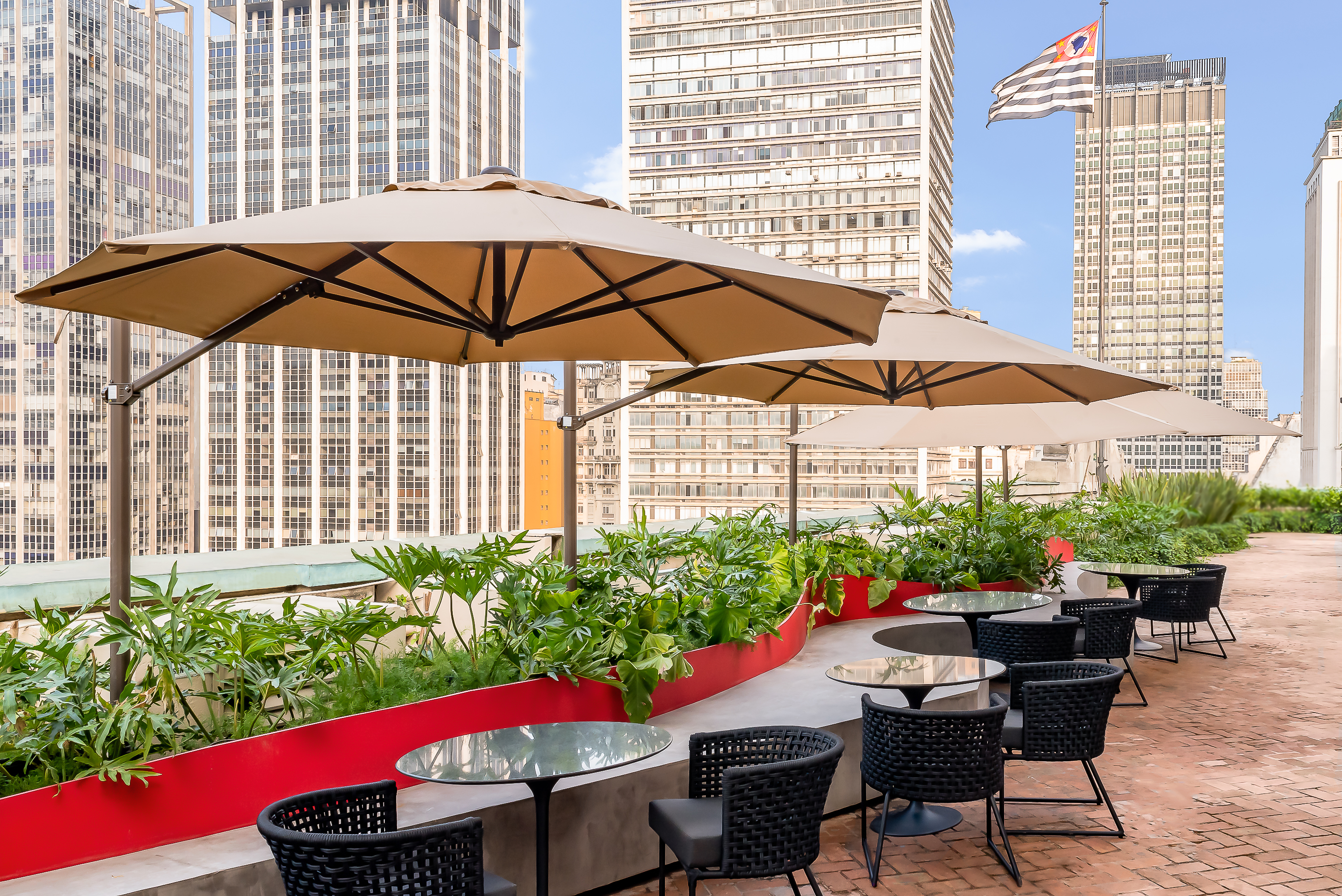
Notiê Restaurant Terrace

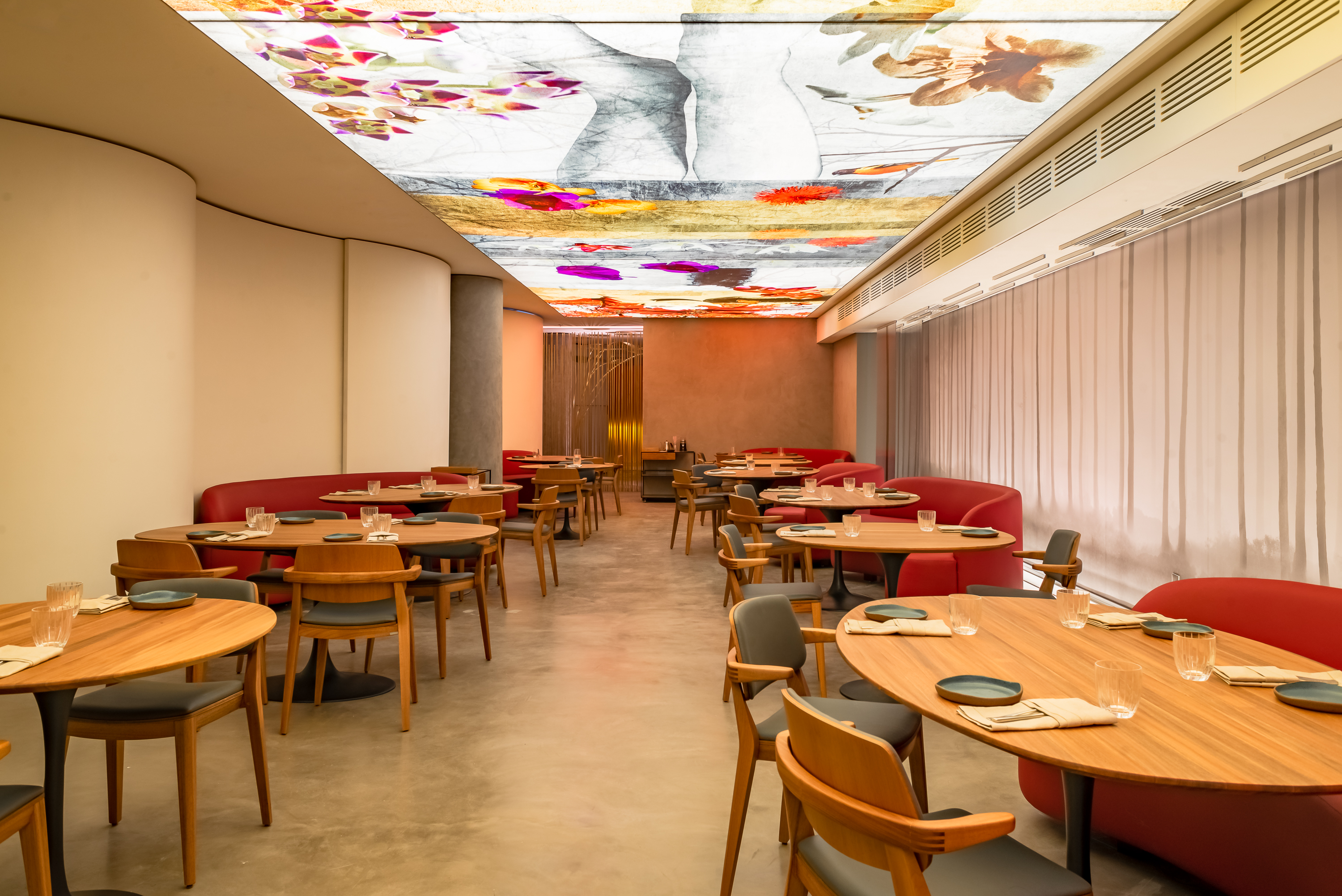
Notiê Restaurant, with a menu signed by Chef Onildo Rocha

The high level of pollution in the central area of São Paulo and the huge circulation of pedestrians demand special attention in terms of preserving the building. As an administrative establishment, with intense use and a large circulation of people, the building ended up undergoing successive adaptations, including irreversible ones. However, the structure was well maintained by its owners, especially its characteristic vintage elevators and its architectural features.

Currently, due to the presence of Shopping Light, the building offers a range of cultural activities, promoting the historical part of the structure and its socio-cultural importance. Among them is the Free Walking Tour, which offers free visits to the Historic Center of São Paulo. The Alexandre Mackenzie Building is also part of the thematic tour Architecture in the Historic Center and the Heritage Day.

== Air Rooftop Club ==
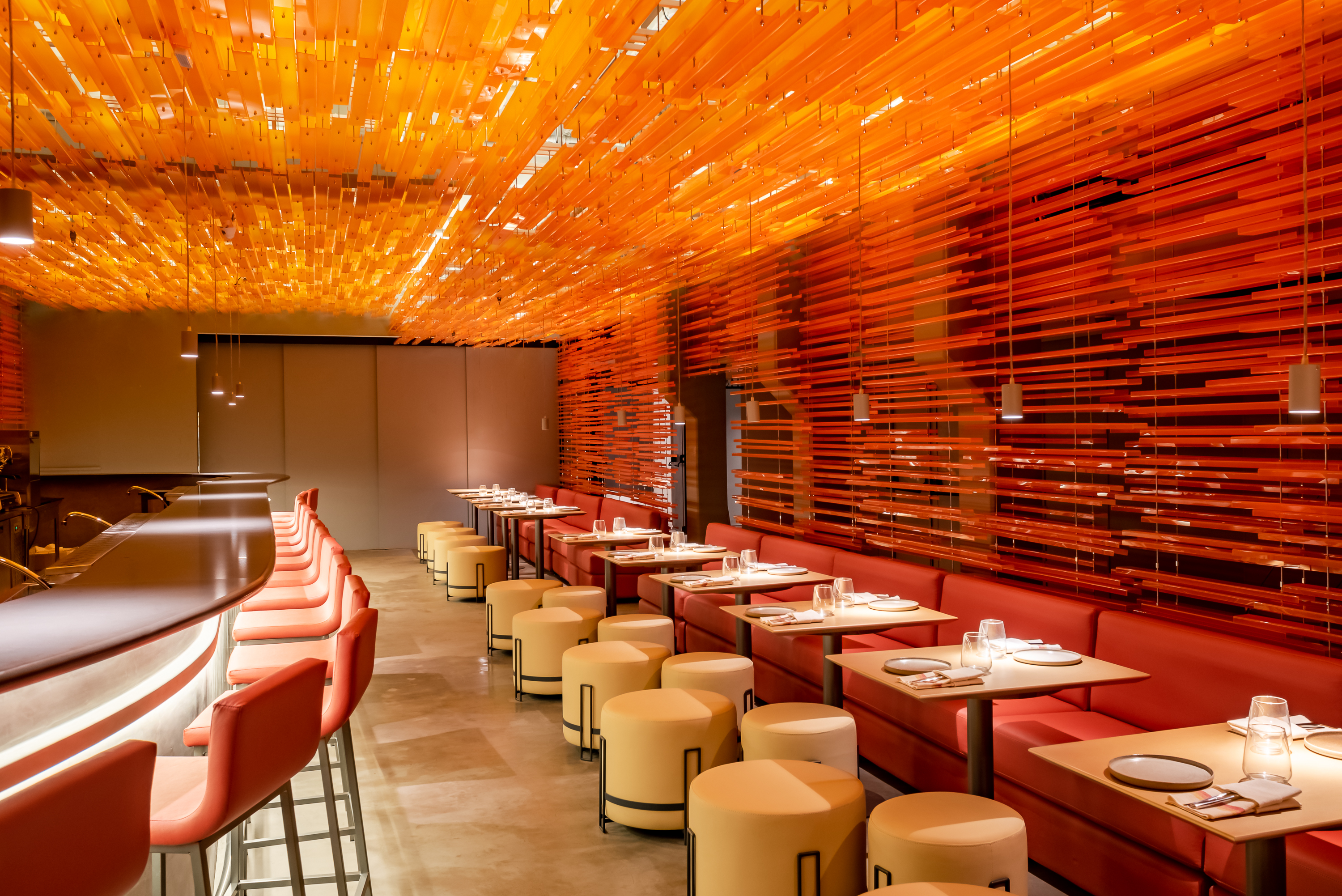
Abaru Bar and Restaurant, with a menu signed by Chef Onildo Rocha

In 2016, the Entourage and Fun2U agencies founded a nightclub on the roof of Shopping Light. Focused on electronic music, the parties take place frequently and bring together national and international artists from the music scene. The venue covers 1500m² with an outdoor dance floor and an indoor area with toilets and a bar area. The establishment has a capacity for 1,000 people during the night. One of its main features is the view of the Anhangabaú Valley, the City Hall and the Municipal Theater, landmarks of the city of São Paulo.

== Mastercard Priceless Space ==
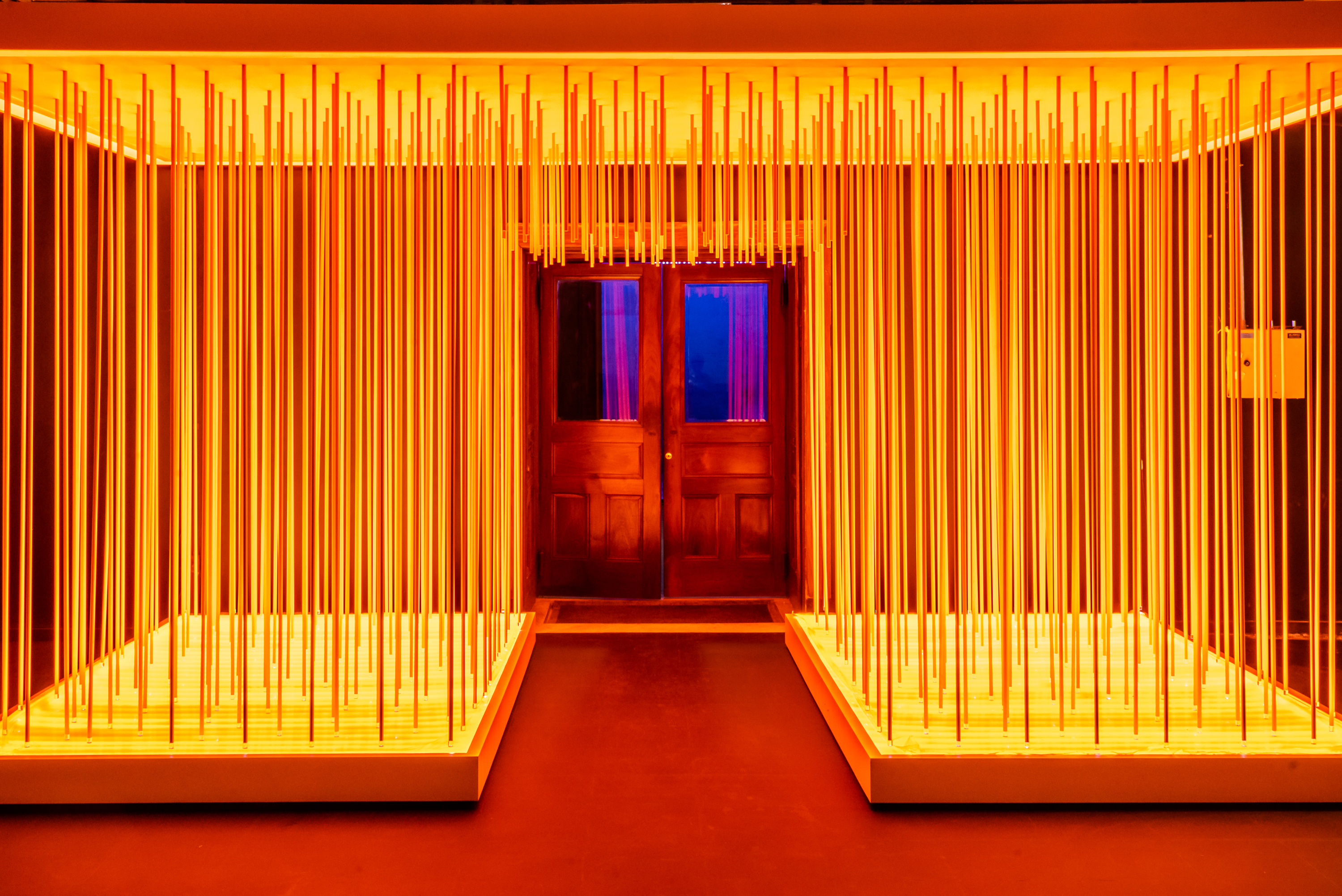
Access portal to the Priceless space

In 2021, Air Rootop left the space and the Bem São Paulo agency took over the administration. With the sponsorship of Mastercard Brasil and in partnership with Chef Onildo Rocha, the company launched the Priceless space with two restaurants, Notiê and Abaru, and the Aroo Acontecimentos space for corporate and social events.

In addition to the restaurants, the venue offers a space for multimedia exhibitions (Atevi), an environment for events and activations (Abaru Annex) and a large terrace overlooking the Historic Center of São Paulo (Botâma). The Priceless space is open every day of the week with lunch, coffee, happy hour and dinner options, as well as an agenda of events and experiences for Mastercard holders and the general public. In addition to Chef Onildo Rocha heading up the menus at the venue's restaurants, the complex also includes mixologist Alê D'Agostino, craft beer specialist Junior Bottura and award-winning barista and coffee specialist Boram Um.

== Aroo Acontecimentos Space ==
Located on the same floor as the Mastercard Priceless space and with the same partners and creatives, the Aroo Acontecimentos venue is a unique alternative for social and corporate events in the Historic Center of São Paulo. The complex has around 1,000m², 3 multipurpose rooms, an entrance hall and a large terrace overlooking the historic center.

== Gallery ==
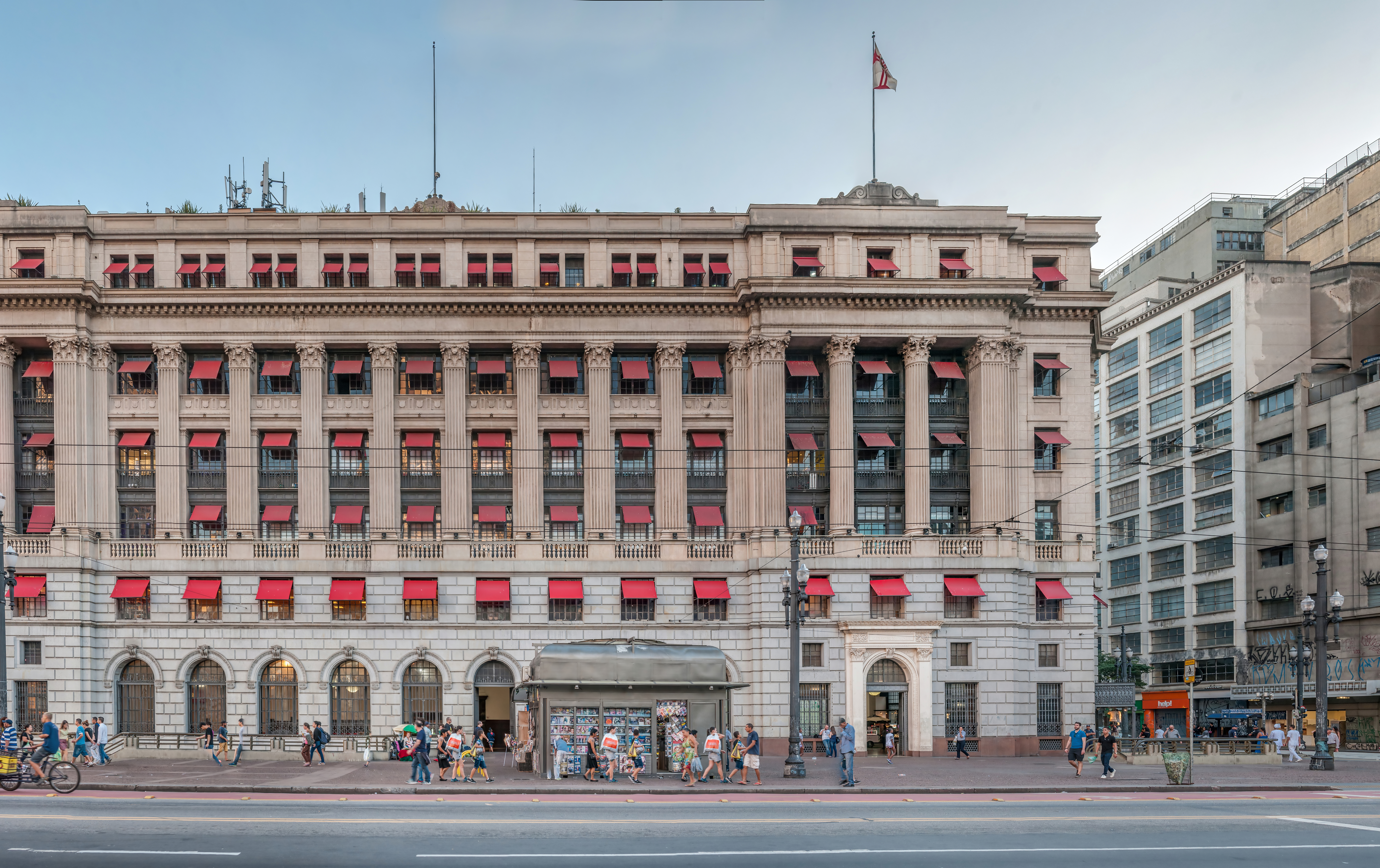
Facade seen from the Viaduto do Chá.

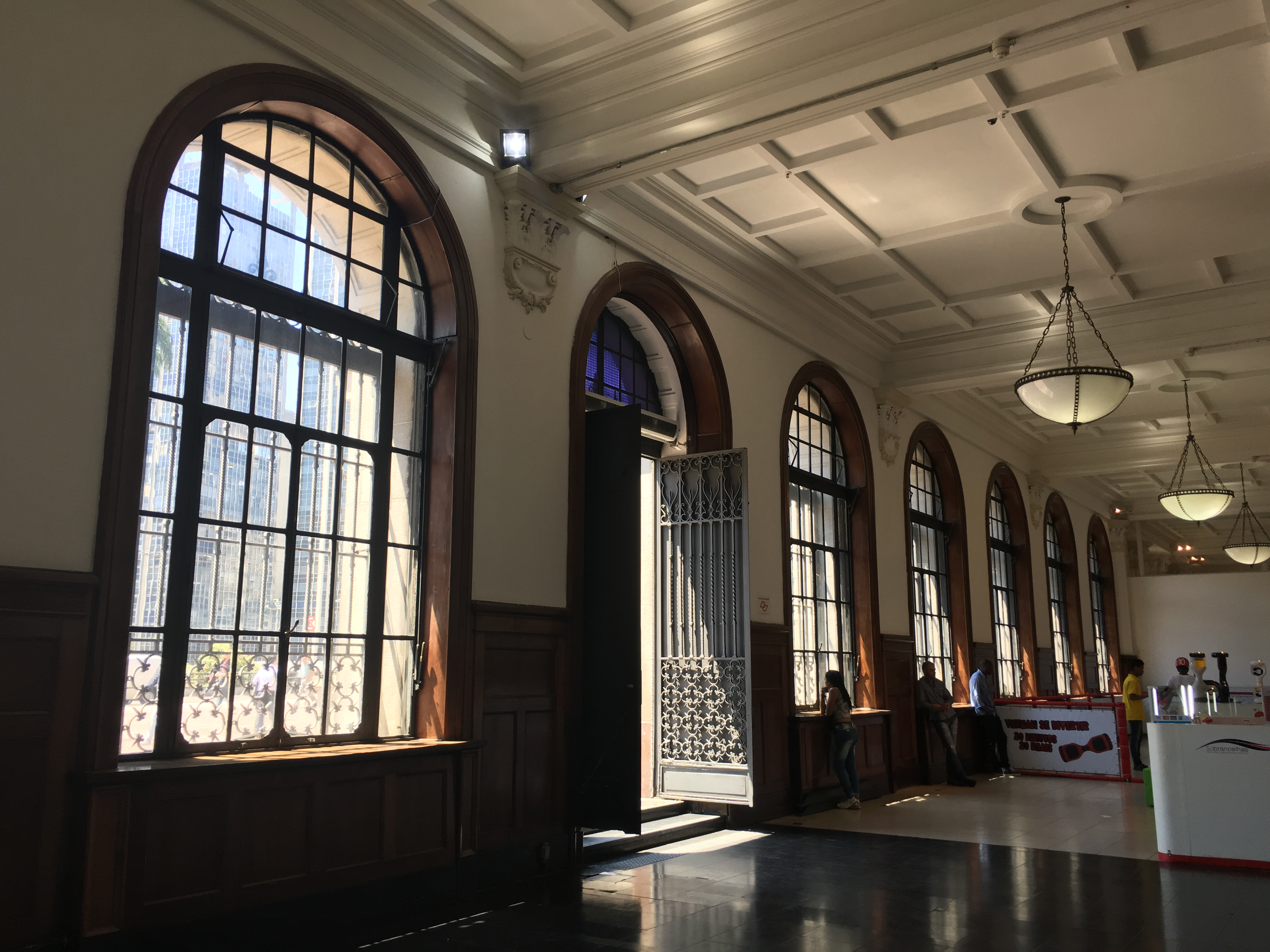
First floor of the building, now Shopping Light.

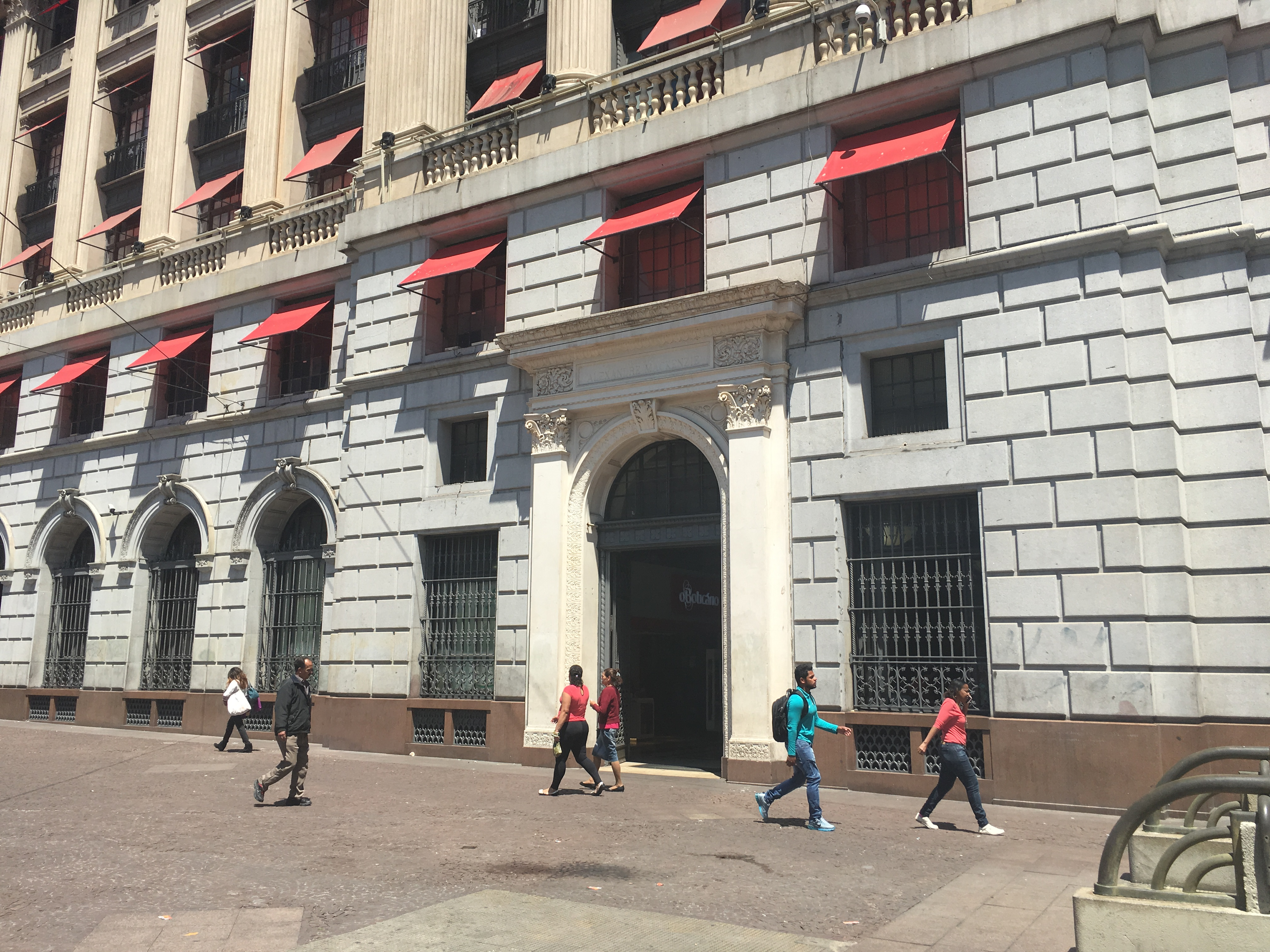
Main entrance via Viaduto do Chá.

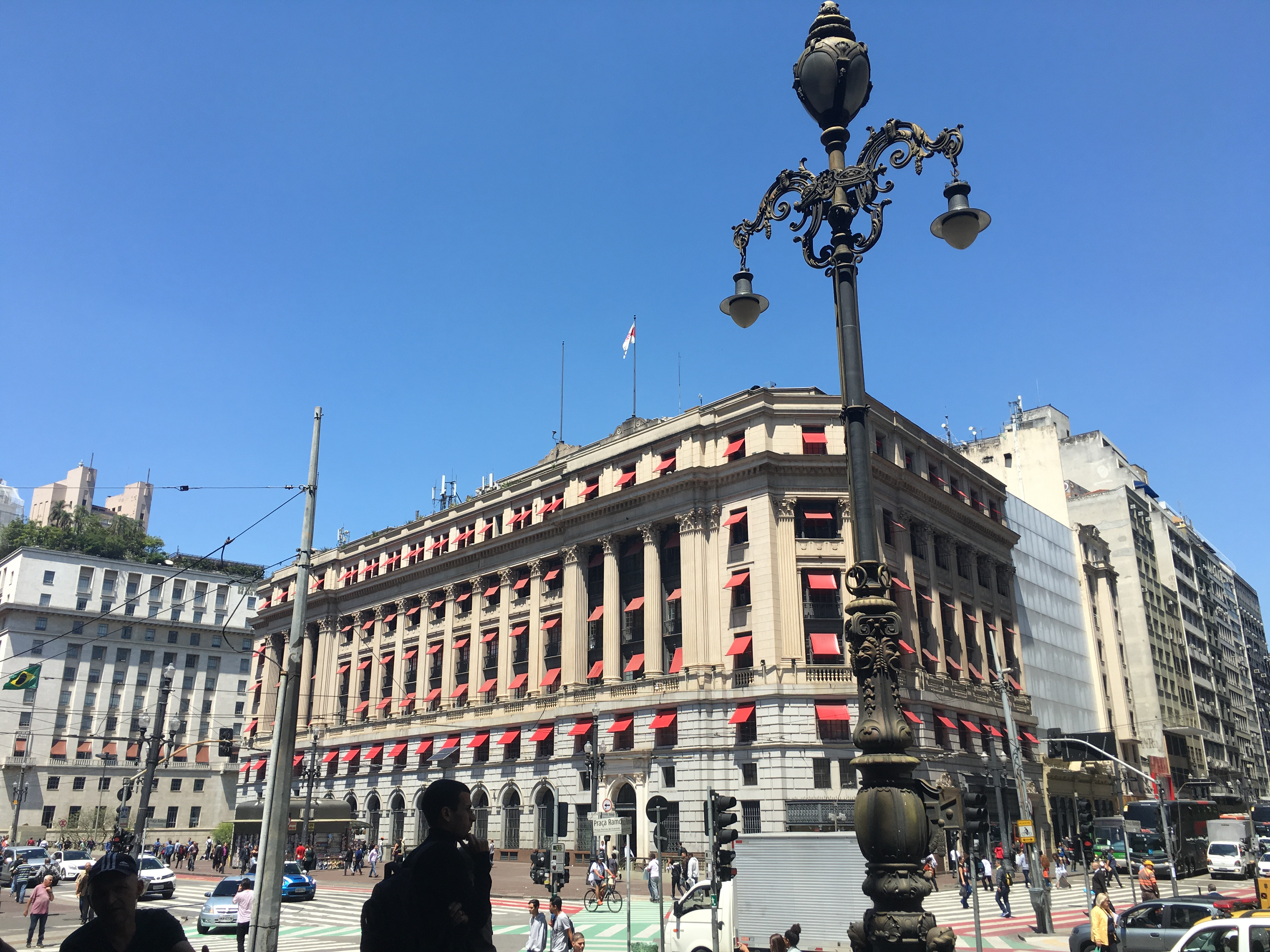
Facade seen from the staircase of the Municipal Theater of São Paulo.

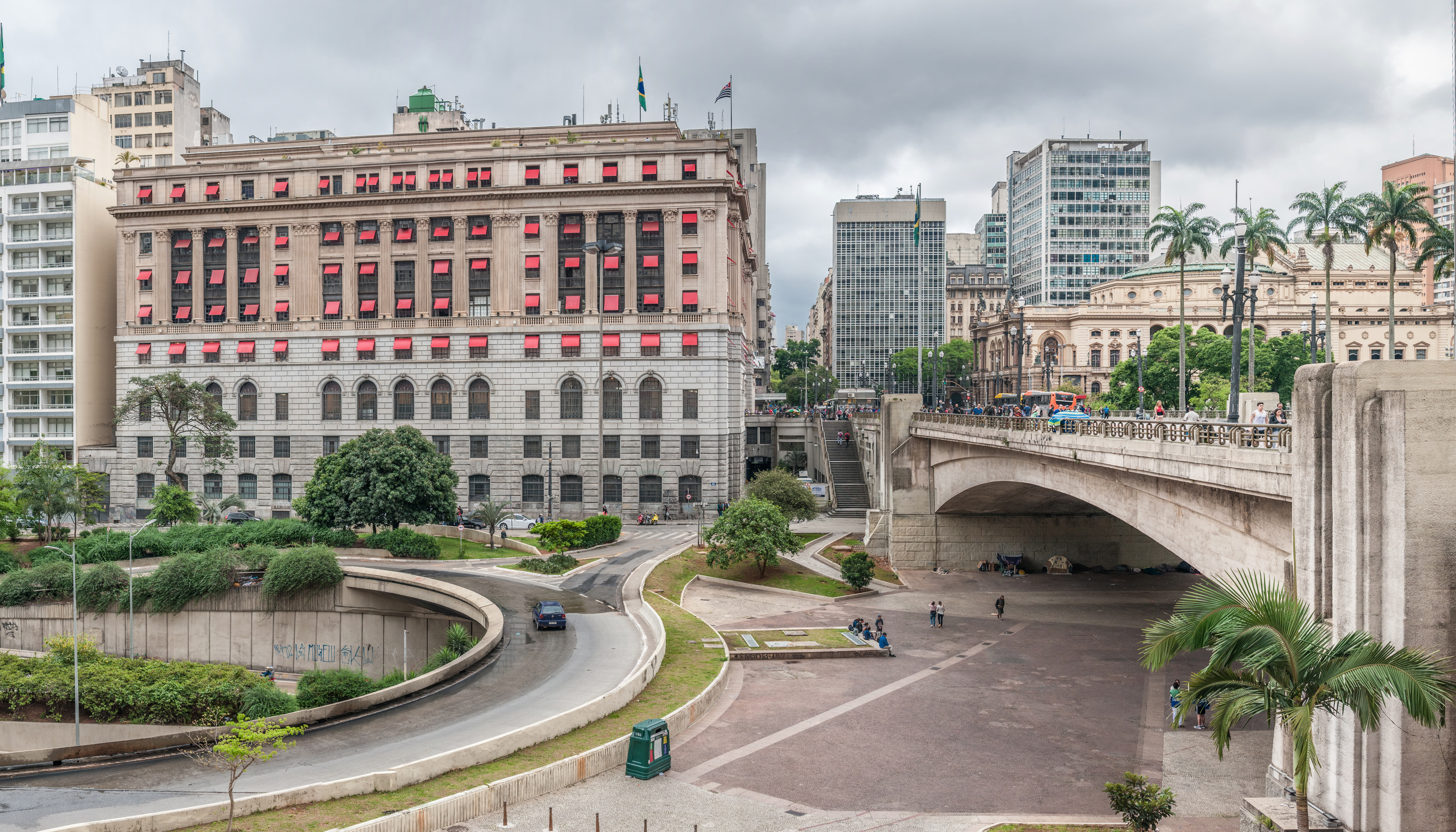
View from the Viaduto do Chá.

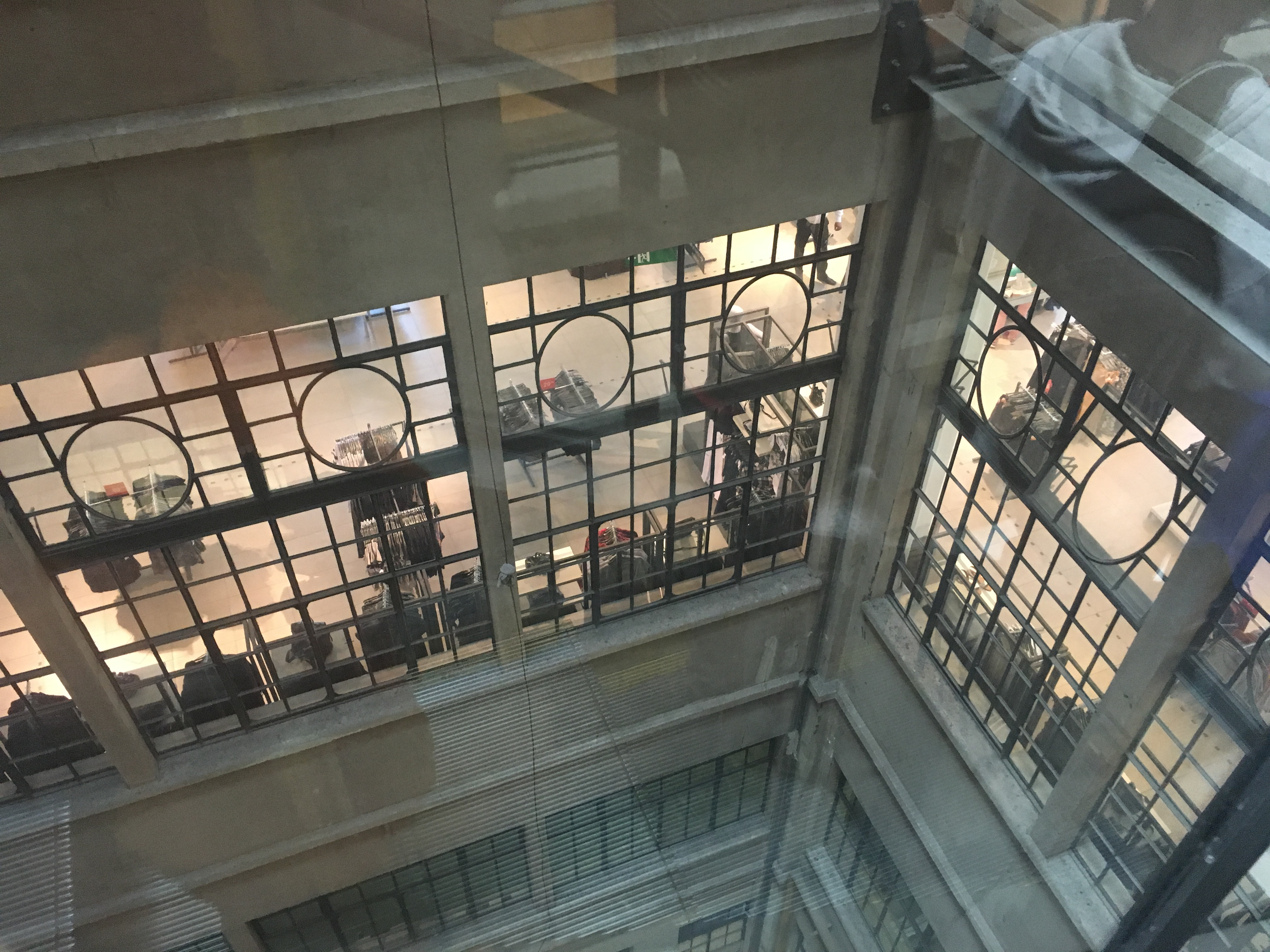
Internal stained glass windows seen from the escalator of the current mall.

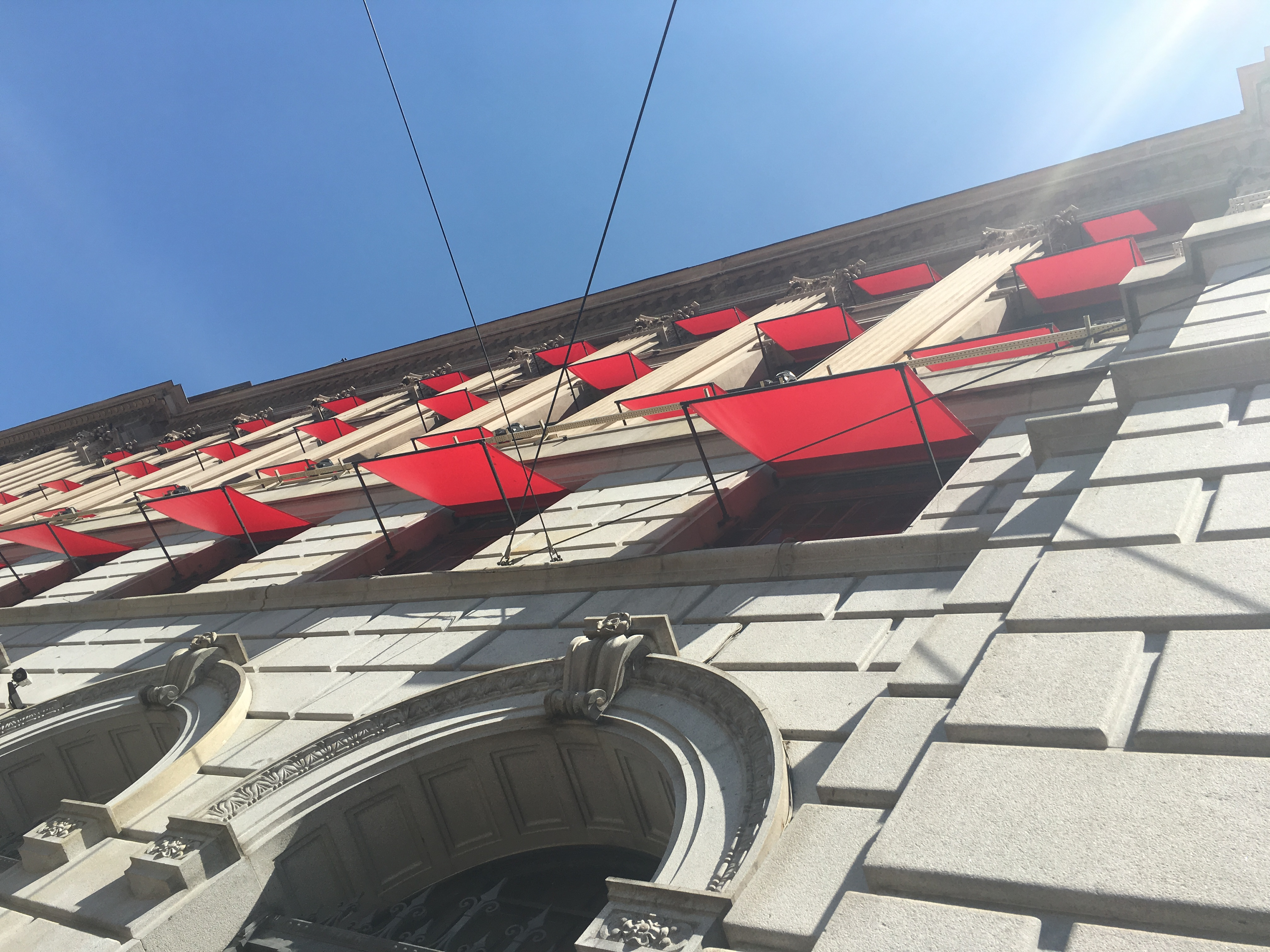
Windows of the Alexandre Mackenzie Building.

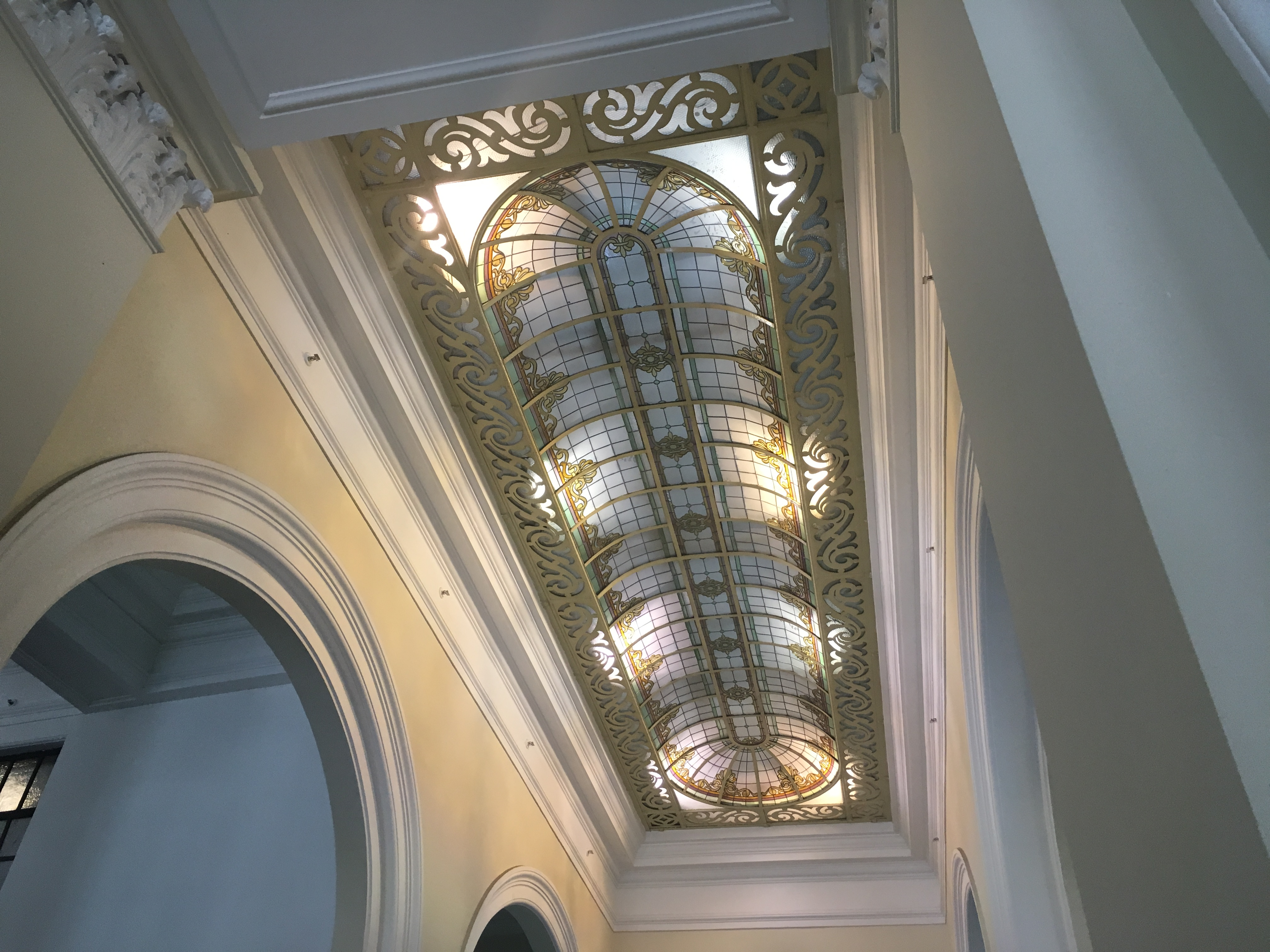
Vault in the main corridor of the Alexandre Mackenzie Building.

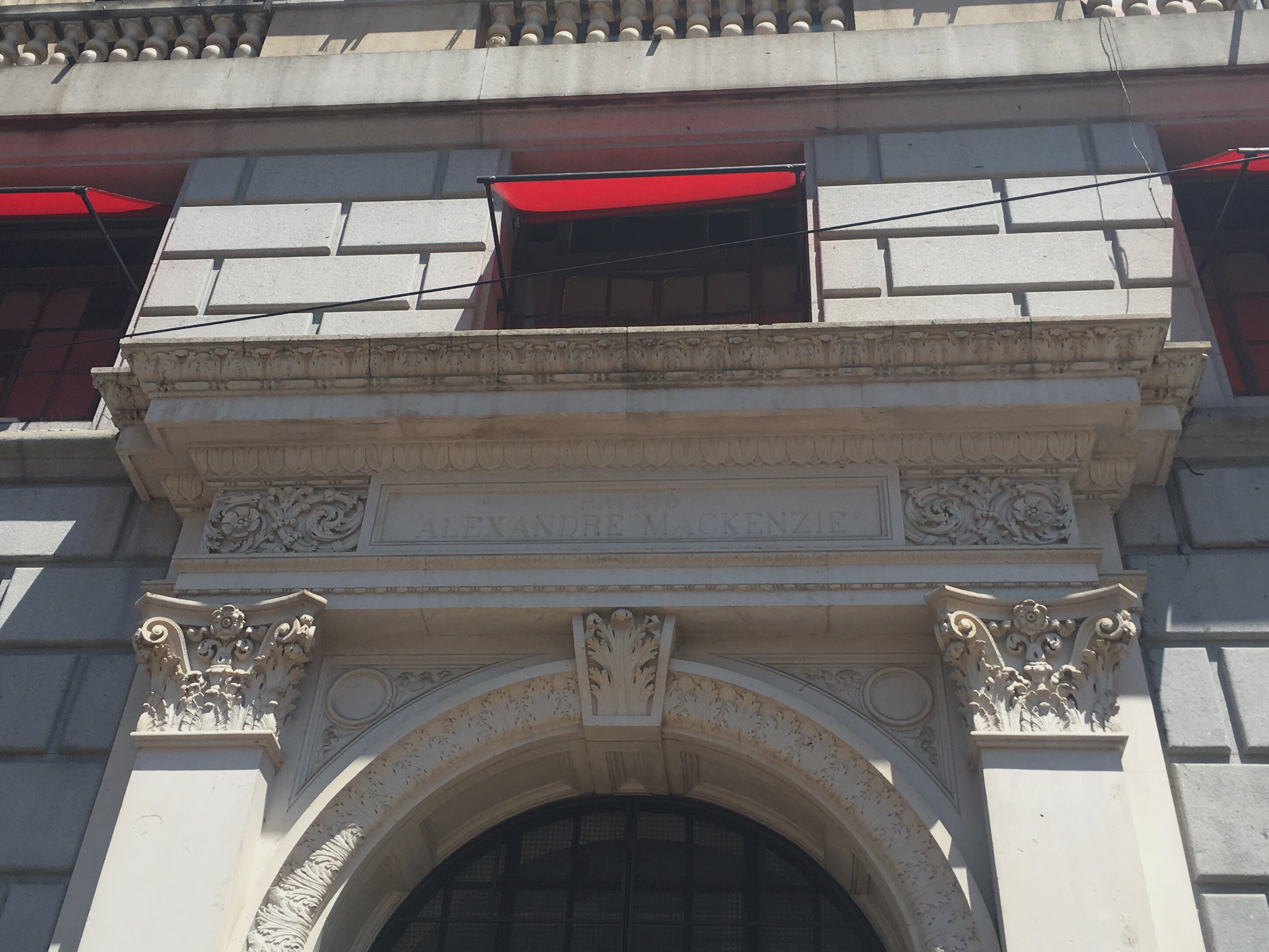
Main entrance sign.

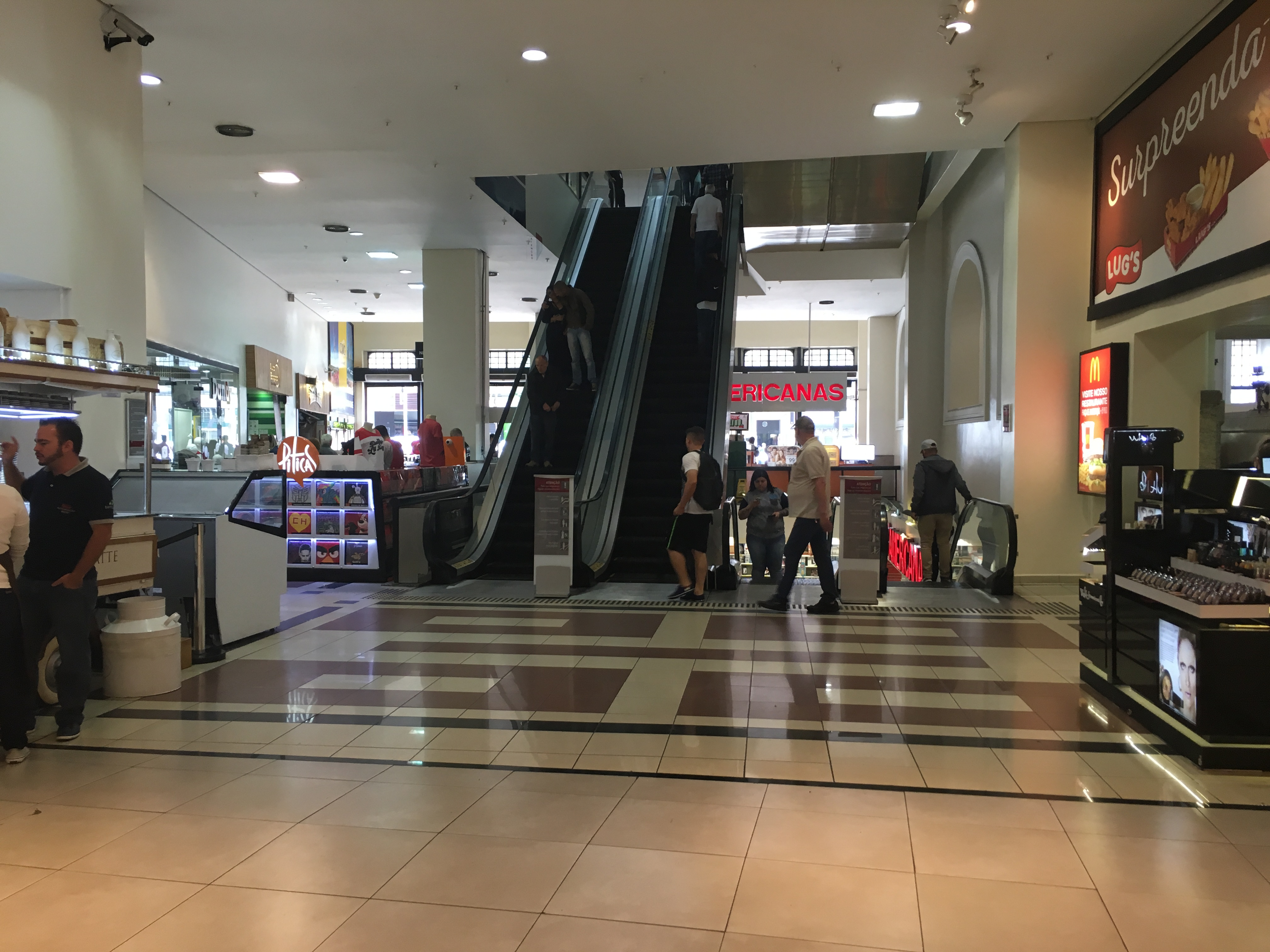
Escalators on the first floor of the current mall.

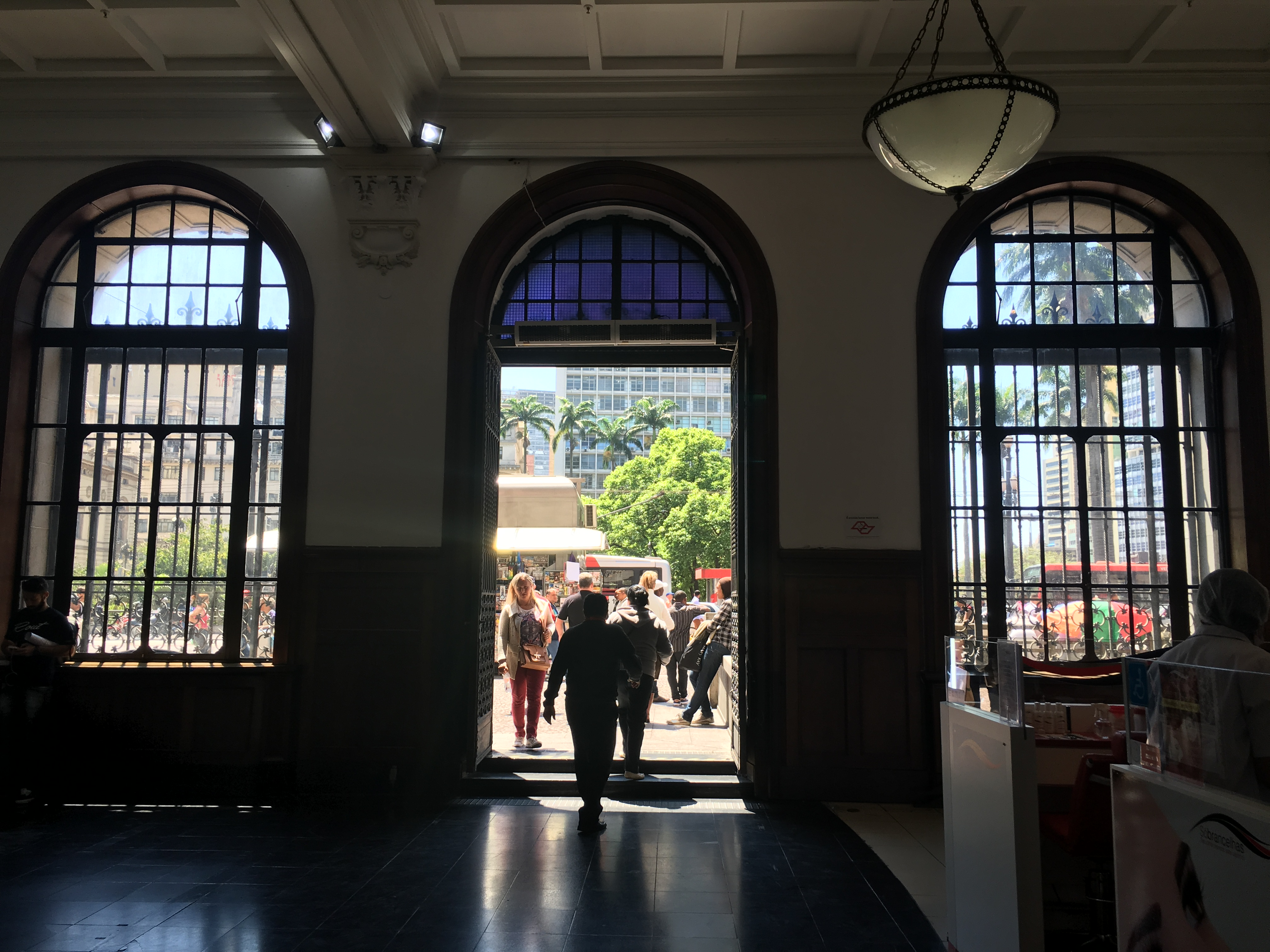
Internal view of the entrance to the Alexandre Mackenzie Building, facing the Viaduto do Chá.

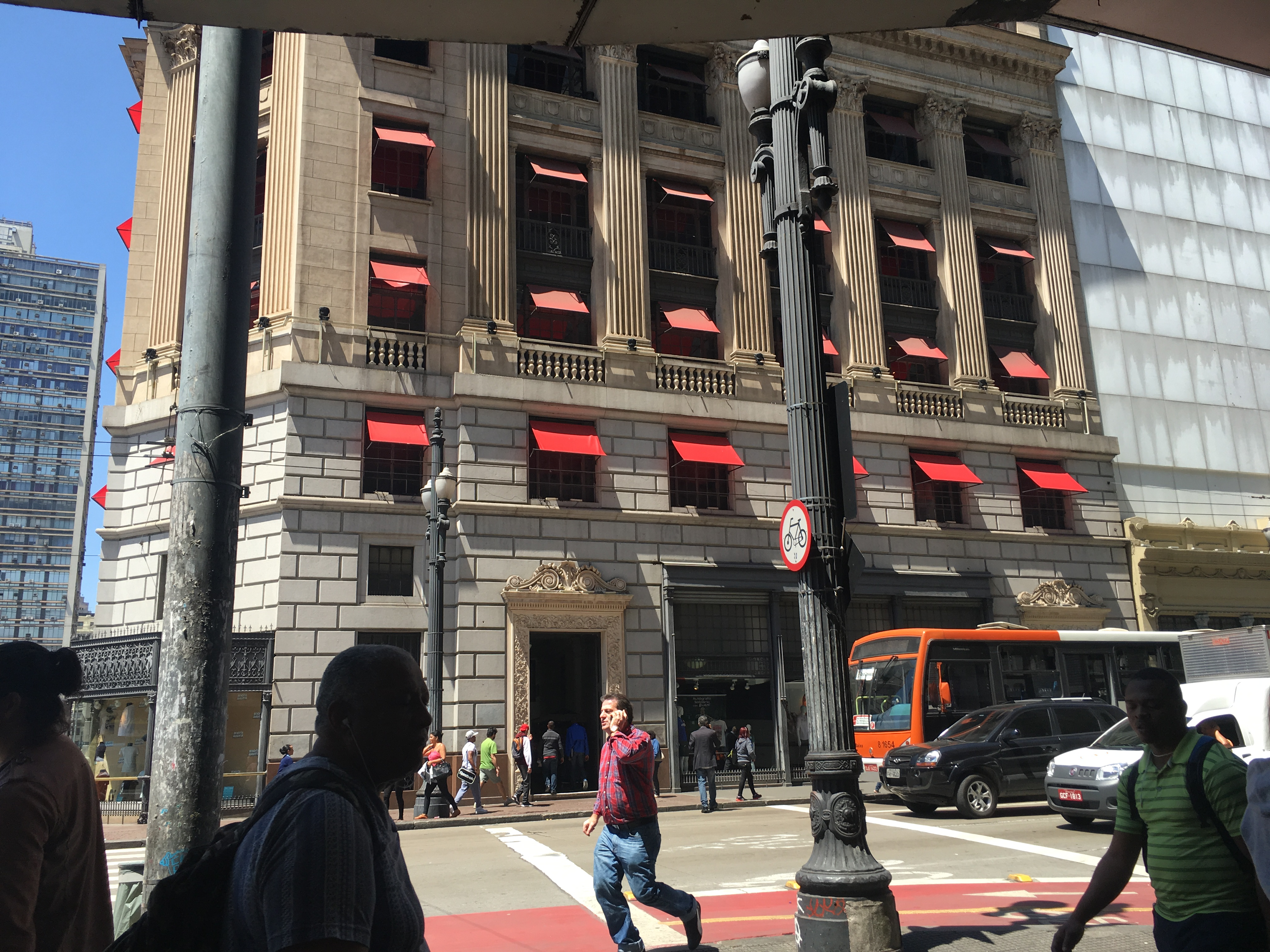
Facade of the building seen from Coronel Xavier de Toledo Street

== See also ==
- Tourism in the city of São Paulo
- Central Zone of São Paulo
- Historic Center of São Paulo
