= São José Theater =

Theater in São Paulo, Brazil

São José Theatre
- Theatro São José
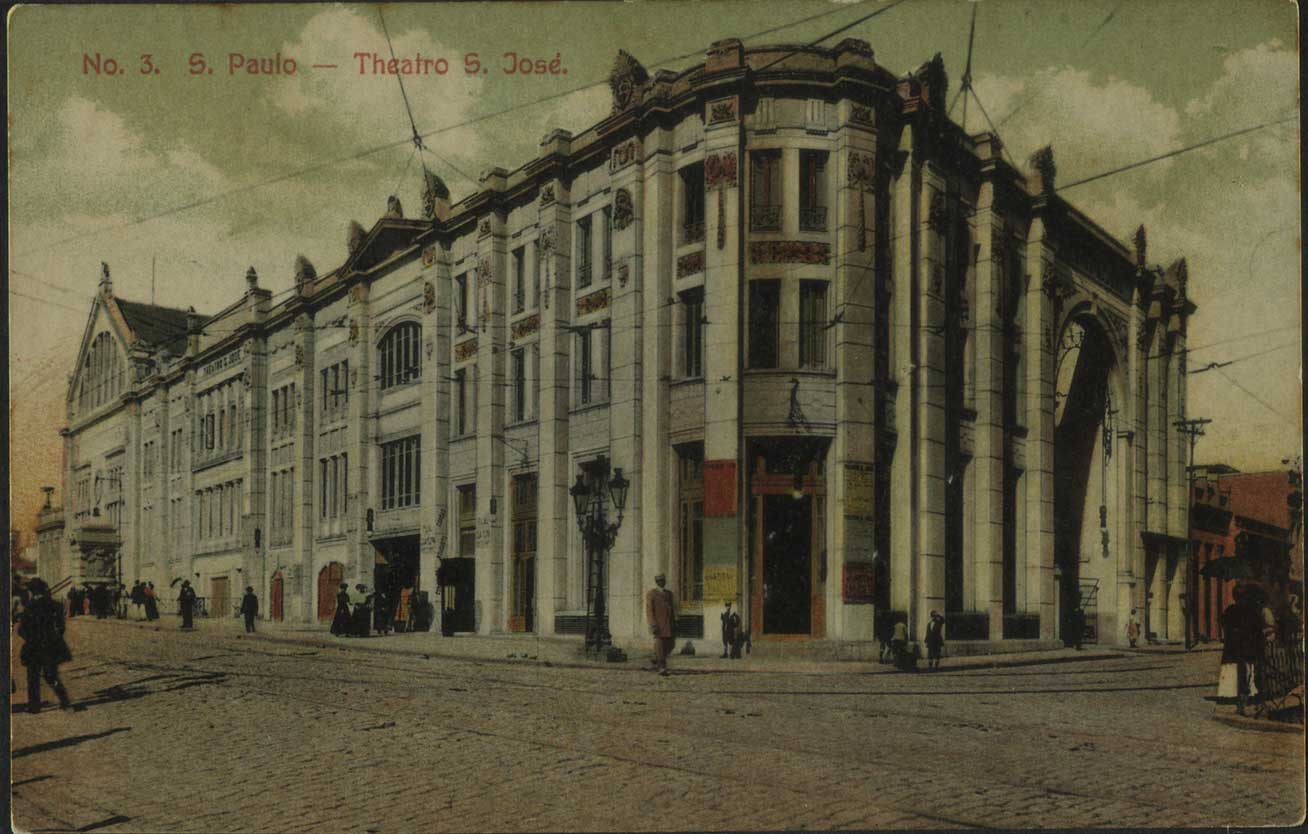
- Facade of the São José Theater in 1911
- Interactive map of the São José Theatre area

General information
- Type: Opera house
- Architectural style: Eclectic
- Location: São Paulo, São Paulo, Brazil
- Coordinates: 23°32′48″S 46°38′19″W
- Construction started: April 7th, 1858 (First building)
- Inaugurated: September 4th, 1864 (First building); December 28, 1909 (Second building)
- Demolished: August 29, 1924 (Second building)

Design and construction
- Architect: Carlos Ekman

Other information
- Seating capacity: 1200 (First building); 3000 (Second building)

The São José Theater (Portuguese: Theatro São José) was an important venue located in Largo São Gonçalo, now Doutor João Mendes Square, in the Brazilian city of São Paulo. Inaugurated on September 4, 1864, its first premises accommodated 1,200 people. In 1898, a fire destroyed the building and a new theater was erected next to the Viaduto do Chá.

Designed by architect Carlos Ekman, the new venue had a capacity for 3,000 people and was inaugurated on December 28, 1909. The São José Theater, affected by the establishment of the Municipal Theater of São Paulo in 1911, remained active until 1919. Later, it was acquired by Light São Paulo, which used its facilities until 1924, when it was demolished to house the Alexandre Mackenzie Building, inaugurated in 1929.

== History ==
In 1854, the Provincial Legislative Assembly of São Paulo approved by law the establishment of a new theater in the city, as the Casa da Ópera, the city's first theater located in Pátio do Colégio, had deteriorated. Initially, the location of the new venue was undefined. Largo de São Francisco, where the Álvares Penteado School of Commerce is located, was considered, but Largo São Gonçalo, now Doutor João Mendes Square, was chosen.

The work was commissioned to Antônio Bernardo Quartim, the contractor responsible for the refurbishment of the Casa da Ópera. The agreement signed between the municipal government and Quartim involved the right to manage the site for 20 years. According to the contract, the venue would include "72 boxes, each 6 meters wide and 13 meters deep, a decent tribune for the President, all surrounded by corridors of sufficient width, an audience with 350 seats and 100 chairs, and, in addition, spacious rooms for recreation, as well as for painting and closet, and 2 bars in the lobby, the walls of the building being made of stone".

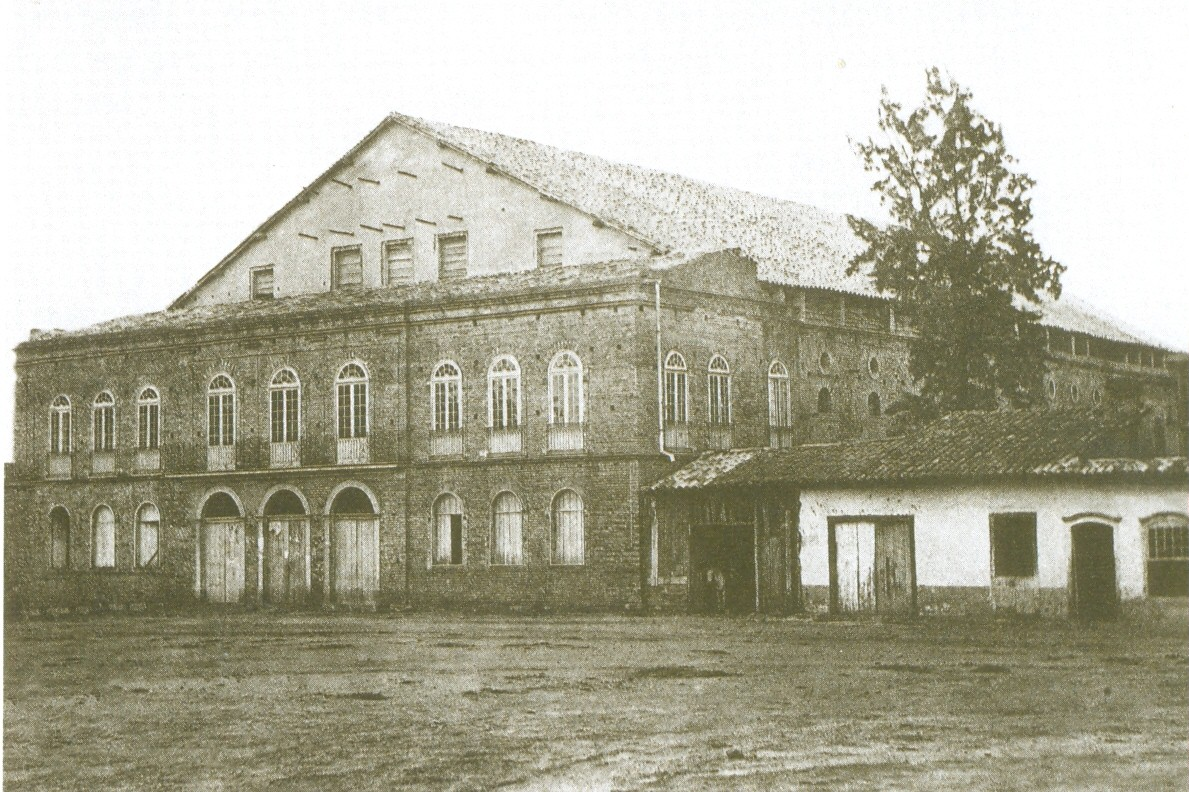
São José Theater still unfinished in 1862.

The cornerstone was set on April 7, 1858, with great celebration; engineer Francisco Antônio de Oliveira was responsible for the building's design. The initial deadline for the work was three years, but constant delays and requests for additional funds provoked criticism from the press. The São José Theatre was inaugurated on September 4, 1864, with a performance of the play Túnica de Nessus, written by law student Sizenando Nabuco. It featured a facade with a combination of exposed bricks, rudimentary pilasters and unadorned window frames, topped by a heavy triangle that formed the ceiling of the hall. It accommodated 1,200 people and was inspired by the great European concert halls. However, the building remained unfinished and in precarious condition after the inauguration.

In 1868, Saldanha Marinho, President of the Province of São Paulo, irritated by the constant work on the building, instructed the Treasury Procurator to intervene. In 1870, a provincial law ordered the closure of the theater. In 1873, during João Teodoro's administration, the irregularities in the work were discovered. After being acquired by the city government, the São José Theater passed to the administration of Antônio da Silva Prado, who renovated the building and completed the work in March 1876, when the venue was inaugurated again.

The São José Theater became an important cultural center in São José and received significant international companies, such as Ermete Novelli's group, which presented ten plays at the site. Japanese jugglers, German magicians, Italian drama companies and artists such as maestro Arturo Toscanini, actress Sarah Bernhardt, Eugênia Câmara and poet Castro Alves, who recited from his cabin, performed at the theater. The place also became the stage for Antonio Bento's abolitionist preaching. On February 15, 1898, on the eve of Carnival, a huge fire destroyed the theater. By dawn, the building was in ruins and only the outer walls remained.

== Second building ==
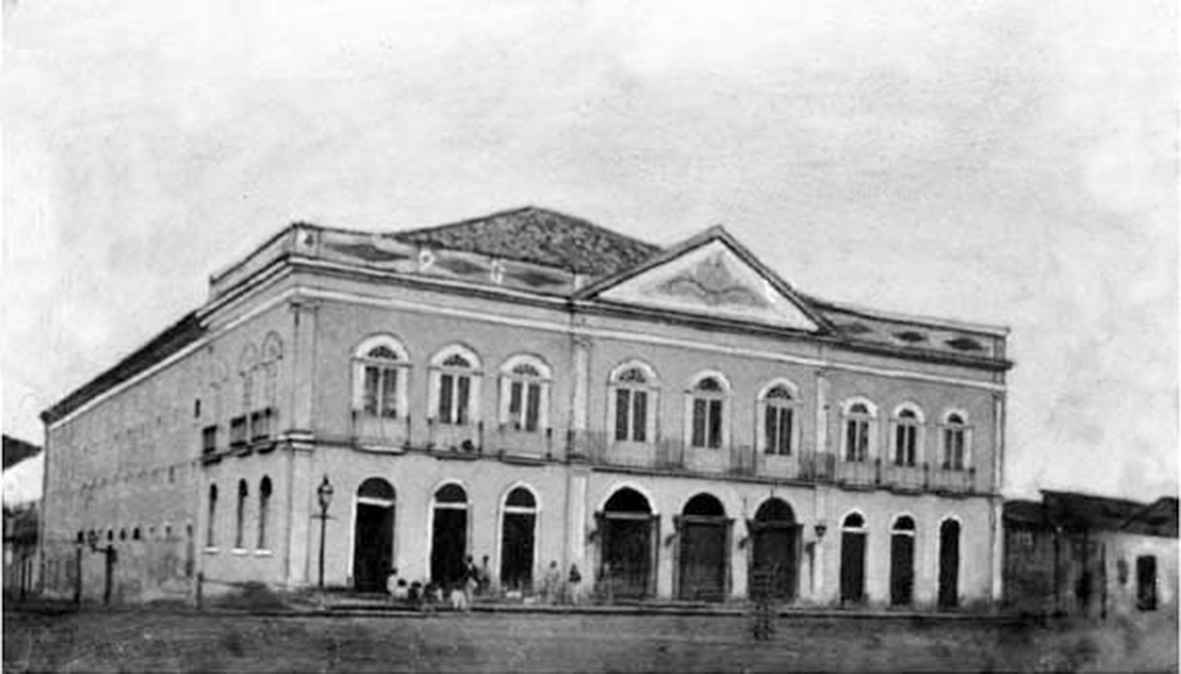
São José Theater after renovations in 1876.

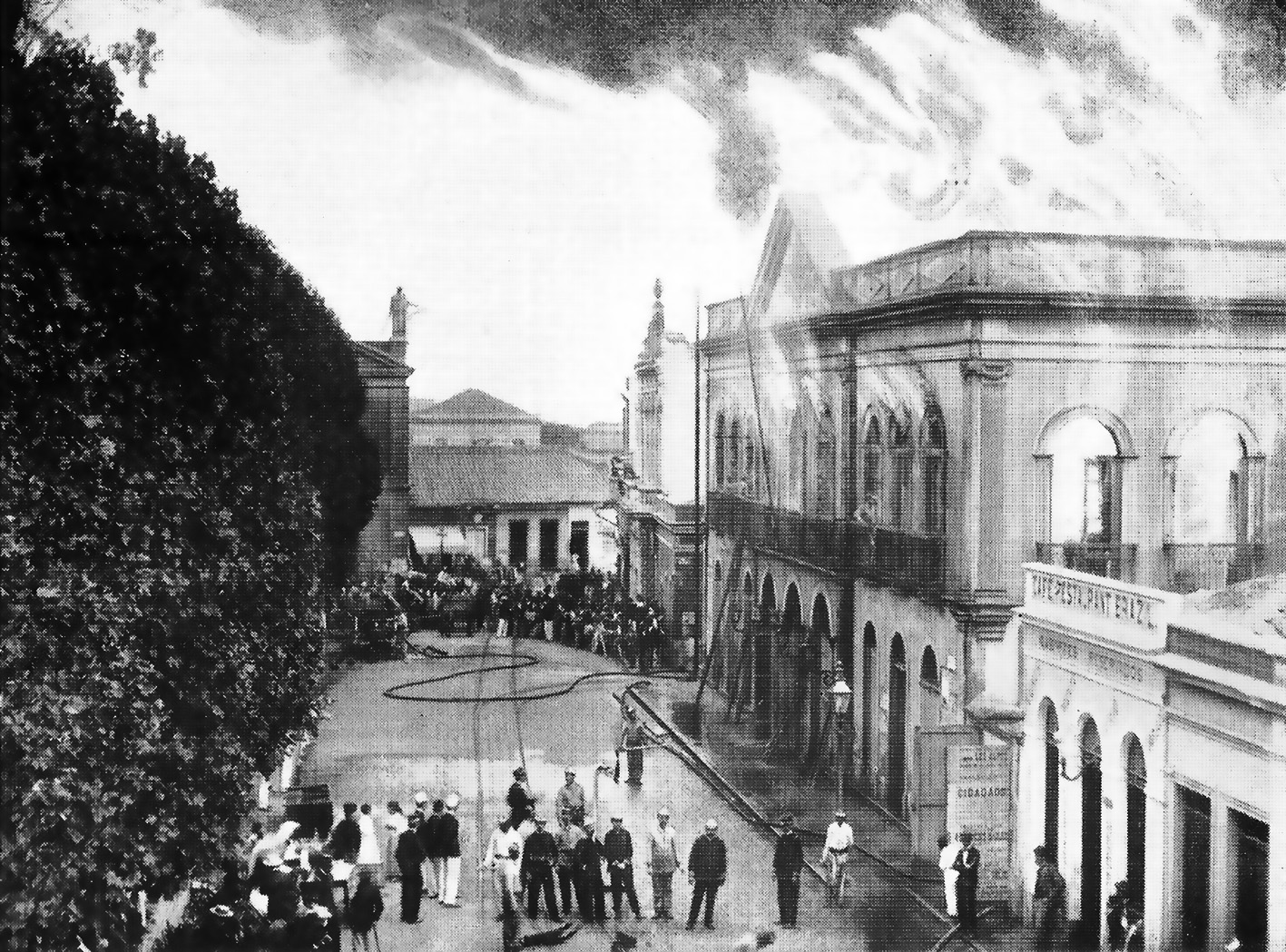
Fire at São José Theater.

At the beginning of the 20th century, the city government ordered the construction of a new headquarters for the São José Theater next to the Viaduto do Chá. Designed in an eclectic style by architect Carlos Ekman, the new building was inaugurated on December 28, 1909. The National Anthem and the overture to the opera Il Guarary by Carlos Gomes were performed at the reopening. The event also included a performance of the opera The Geisha by Owen Hall and Sidney Jones, featuring a cast from the Ernesto Lahoz Company. The next day, Les saltimbanques by Louis Ganne was announced, followed by A Waltz Dream by Straus and The Merry Widow by Franz Lehár, which concluded the 1909 season.

The new São José Theater had a capacity of 3,000 spectators, distributed in 387 seats in the audience, 39 boxes, 28 rows, 356 seats in the amphitheater, 415 in the balconies and 629 in the galleries. The audience had a traditional horseshoe shape with a privileged view of the stage, as the building's design exploited the slope towards the Anhangabaú Valley located at the back of the complex. The building had rooms for administration, a waiting room for spectators, catering facilities and toilets. The stage, one of the largest in São Paulo, suited any kind of show and had an orchestra pit capable of holding 70 musicians, thirteen dressing rooms and four compartment rooms.

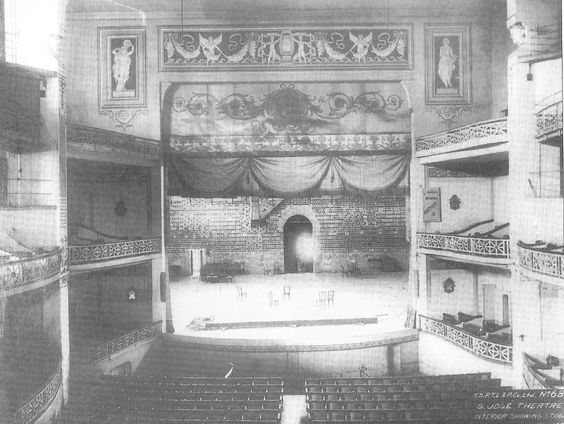
Interior of the theater with a view of the orchestra pit and stage, 1920.

In 1910, the venue had a successful season with several international artists. On December 23, the Ratoli-Biloro Italian Lyric Company debuted, together with the Schiaffino Company, which staged the operas: Aida, Manon Lescaut, Cavalleria Rusticana, I Pagliacci, Rigoletto, Werther, L'amico Fritz, Il Guarany, La Traviata, Tosca, La Gioconda, La Bohème, Carmen, Il Trovatore, Faust, Un ballo in maschera and Mefistófele.

In 1911, after the inauguration of the Municipal Theater of São Paulo, the São José Theater's activities changed and it resorted to short seasons, second-rate casts and small audiences. The venue was forced to allocate part of its premises to small stores, ateliers, tailors' workshops and residences. In 1919, it closed as a theater and became the property of Assunção e Cia.

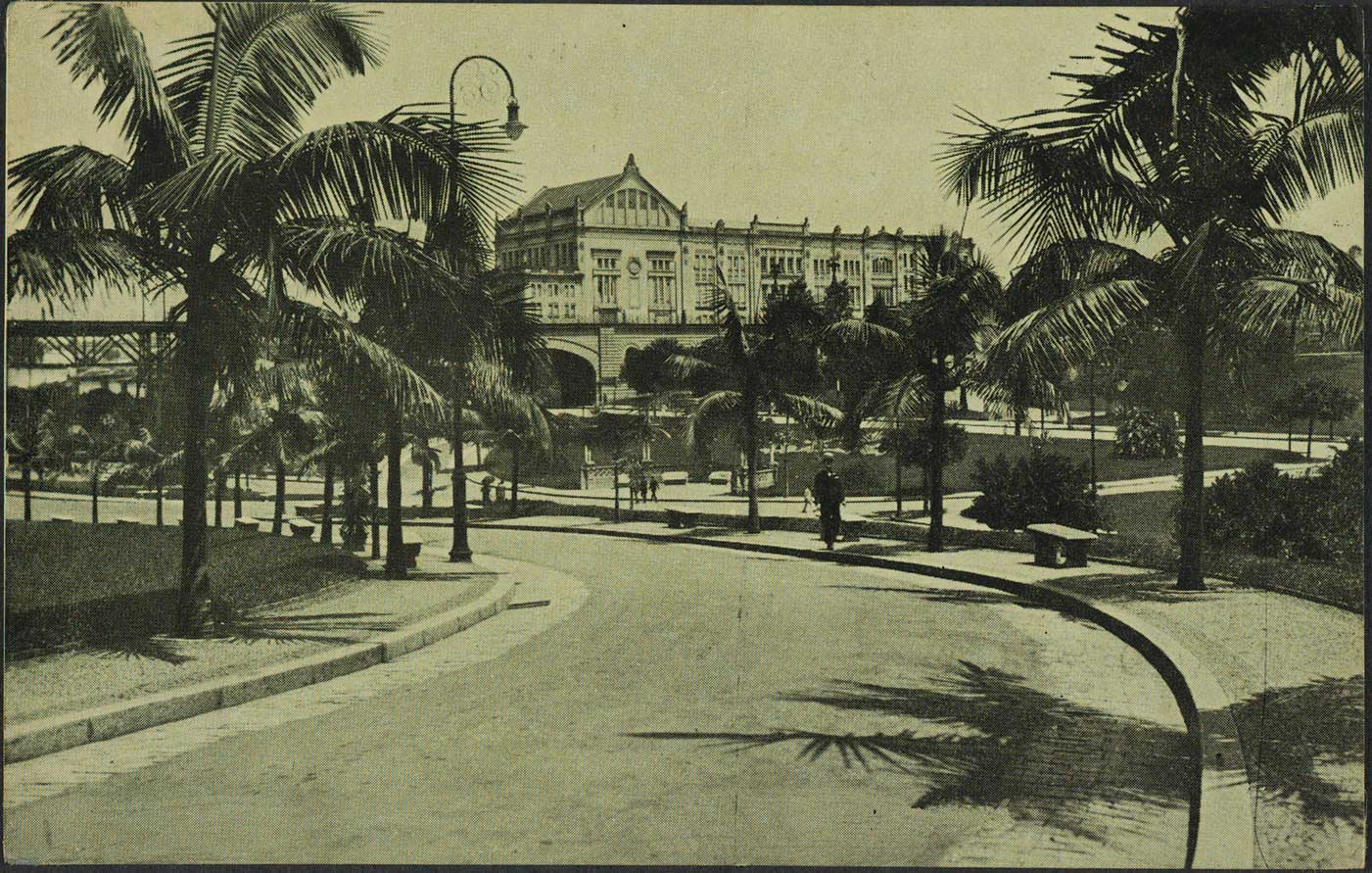
Anhangabaú Park, view of the theater.

On June 27, 1920, the Light São Paulo company acquired the building to house its activities. After the purchase, Light offered the tenants 60 days to vacate the building. They were also asked to remove the advertising panels belonging to Água Platina and Cimento Rodovalho displayed on the theater's facade. Tenants only left in May 1923. After attempts to adapt the space, Light concluded that demolishing the building and constructing a new one would be ideal.

On August 29, 1924, the contract for the demolition of the building was signed. The waste served to fill in the area where the Municipal Market of São Paulo is located. The decorative pieces on the theater's facades, such as the mascarons and cement sculptures, were reused in the construction of Vila Itororó, built by the Portuguese merchant Francisco de Castro. The Alexandre Mackenzie Building, which housed the activities of Light São Paulo and Eletropaulo, was erected on the theater site. Currently, the property houses Shopping Light.

== See also ==
- Anhangabaú Valley
- Central Zone of São Paulo
