= São Paulo Tramway, Light and Power Company =

Canadian capital company that operated in São Paulo

- Trade name: Light Serviços de Eletricidade S.A.
- Type: Private
- Founded: Toronto, Canada (April 7, 1899)
- Defunct: 1981
- Fate: Acquired by Eletropaulo
- Successor: Eletropaulo
- Headquarters: São Paulo, Brazil
- Key people: William Mackenzie; Frederick Stark Pearson

São Paulo Tramway, Light and Power Company, also known as Light São Paulo or simply Light (Portuguese pronunciation: [ˈlajtʃ]), was a privately owned utility company operating in São Paulo, Brazil from 1899 until 1981.

== History ==
Canadian William Mackenzie and American Frederick Stark Pearson founded the São Paulo Tramway, Light and Power Company in 1899. In 1900 Light São Paulo began operating the first tram line in the city of São Paulo which ran to Barra Funda.

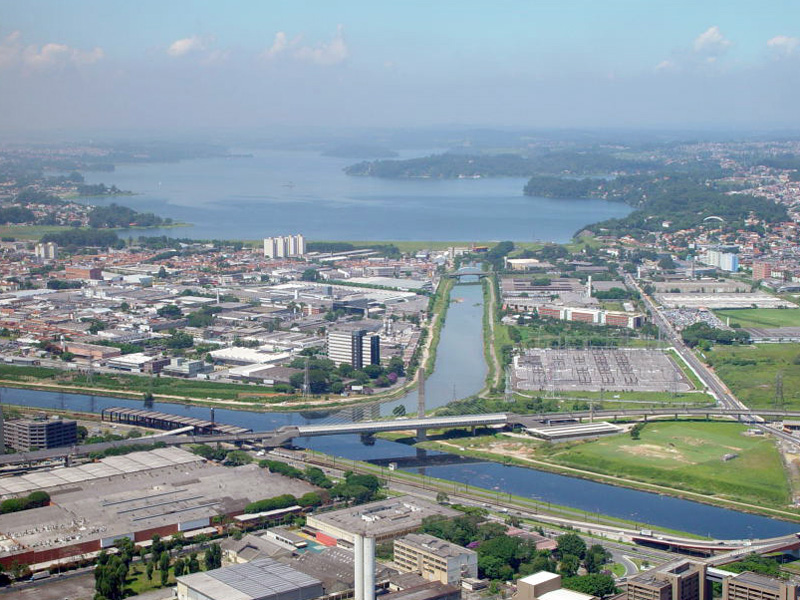
Reservoir at Guarapiranga today

Work began in 1901 on the hydroelectric plant in Santana de Parnaíba. It opened in 1905. In 1905 the company installed the first electric street lights on Rua Barão de Itapetininga. In 1906 the company constructed a reservoir at Guarapiranga. In 1907 they installed 50 more lights on Direita Street, Rua 15 de Novembro, and Rua São Bento.

The company signed a contract with the state of São Paulo for the first time in 1911. By 1916 they had installed 8,605 gas lights and 864 electric street lamps in the city.

In 1927 the company won a government contract to transfer the surplus flow of the Tietê River to feed the Henry Borden hydroelectric power plant in Cubatão, requiring the inversion of the natural flow of Pinheiros River. As part of the concession contract, the company received the right to expropriate wetlands surrounding the river basin for both its own use and city infrastructure projects, with a clause giving previous owners priority in subsequent real estate auctions. In February 1929 the region was subjected to above-average precipitation which, due to company operations (the opening of the Guarapiranga and Billings Reservoir sluices while closing the Santana de Parnaíba dam, trapping the surplus water in the metropolitan region of São Paulo) resulted in the worst flooding in the city history, the water level rising 3.45 meters above the normal levels and resulting in 38 deaths. When the water level receded, the company identified the affected areas with bronze plaques which marked them for expropriation, totaling 20.779.443 square meters (about 1/3 of the total metropolitan area). To avoid the buy-back clause the company resorted to side agreements with expropriated proprietors, only 10% of the expropriated properties returning to their original owners. Despite ample press coverage at the time, the company was never formally indicted due to political pressure.

== Successors ==
SPTL&P's tramways were acquired by Companhia Municipal de Transportes Coletivos in 1946, SPTL&P line disappeared in the early 1960s and eventually the city's remaining tram routes by 1968 with buses or trolleybuses.

In 1916 the telephone companies merged to create the Companhia Telefônica Brasileira (CTB) and now succeeded by what is now Telebrás.

During the 1930s, while Fábio da Silva Prado was mayor, electric light was brought to the rest of the city. This expansion continued under Prestes Maia in the following decades.

In 1947 the utility companies were nationalized.

In 1981 the city government under Mayor Paulo Maluf created Eletropaulo.

== See also ==
- Brookfield Asset Management
- Light S.A.
- Usina Hidrelétrica Edgard de Sousa (in Portuguese)
- Companhia Telefônica Brasileira (CTB) (in Portuguese)
- Alexandre Mackenzie Building
