= Enel Distribution São Paulo =

Enel São Paulo
- Type: Subsidiary
- Industry: Electricity
- Predecessor: Eletropaulo
- Founded: 1999
- Headquarters: São Paulo, Brazil
- Key people: Andrew Martin Vesey, (Chairman); Britaldo Pedrosa Soares, (CEO)
- Products: Electrical power
- Services: Electricity distribution
- Revenue: ▲US$ 3.7 billion (2018)
- Net income: ▼ - US$ 82.5 million (2018)
- Number of employees: 7,355
- Parent: Enel
- Website: www.eneldistribuicaosp.com.br

Enel Distribuição São Paulo (Enel Distribution São Paulo), former Eletropaulo Metropolitana and AES Eletropaulo, is a major Brazilian power distributor in the state of São Paulo, created in the breakup of the old state-owned power distribution company Eletropaulo that monopolized electricity distribution in São Paulo from 1981 to 1999. The similarity of the names makes most old customers call it simply Eletropaulo.

The company has around 5.8 million customers – nearly 20 million people – in an area of 4,526 square kilometers, in 24 municipalities in the metropolitan area of São Paulo, including the city itself;

Ownership of AES Eletropaulo is shared by Italian giant power company Enel. Its stock was traded on B3, and was part of the Ibovespa index.

== History ==
Electrical power infrastructure in São Paulo was originally developed in the first half of the 20th century by the São Paulo Tramway, Light and Power Company, a company financed with foreign capital and legally domiciled in Toronto, Ontario, Canada. After 1912, this company was part of the holding company Brazilian Traction, Light and Power Company (usually known in Brazil simply as "Light"), which eventually changed its name to Brascan (for "Brasil" + "Canada"). At the end of the 1970s, the company's Brazilian assets transferred to Brazilian ownership, first to private hands and then (in 1981) to the government of the state of São Paulo. The Canadian company, which had in the meantime diversified to other areas, still exists under the name Brookfield Asset Management.
