= Monument to the Duke of Caxias =

Monument in São Paulo, Brazil

- Monumento a Duque de Caxias
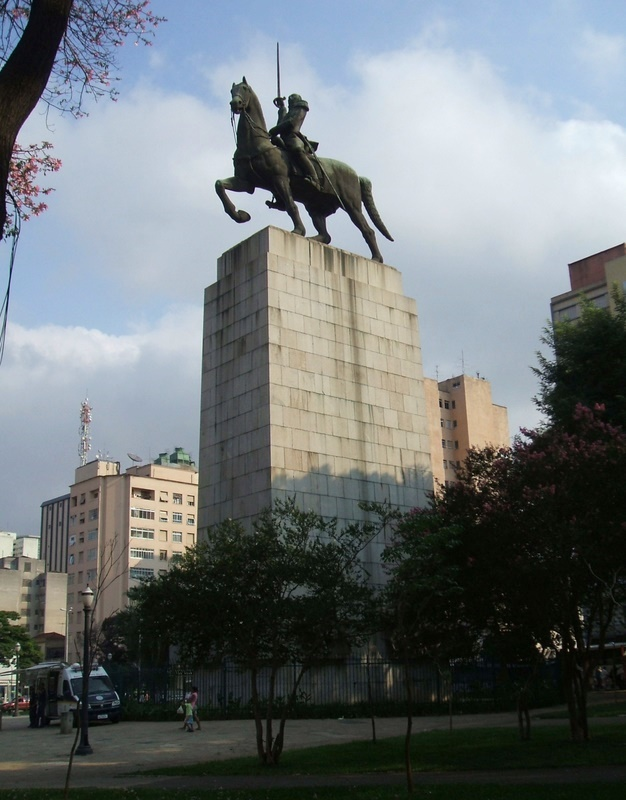
- View of the Monument

- Location within São Paulo Monument to the Duke of Caxias (Brazil)

General information
- Location: São Paulo, São Paulo; Brazil
- Coordinates: 23°32′11″S 46°38′36″W

Design and construction
- Architect: Victor Brecheret

The Monument to the Duke of Caxias (Portuguese: Monumento a Duque de Caxias) is a platinum bronze statue on a granite pedestal depicting the battles of the Duke of Caxias. Located in the city of São Paulo, the monument is 48 meters high and is the second largest equestrian memorial in the world.

== History ==
The idea of building a monument to honor Luís Alves de Lima e Silva, the Duke of Caxias, considered Brazil's greatest military hero, emerged in 1939 when General Maurício José Cardoso commanded the 2nd Military Region. He started a movement to raise funds from the São Paulo community and, in 1941, established an international competition for design ideas.

Among the 30 contestants, Victor Brecheret became the winner after designing a plaster model. Built in the shed of the São Paulo School of Arts and Crafts, the work was conceived with a granite pedestal and patinated bronze and has a total height of 48 meters. The granite has been ornamented to depict his victories, joys and burial. As in the Monument to the Flags, also created by Brecheret, the piece presents a panorama of the life of the Duke.

Besides the 18-ton bronze structure of the Duke of Caxias on his horse, the base of the monument includes sculptures depicting scenes from his military career. The bas-reliefs feature the following themes: Pacificação (Pacification), Caxias falando ao povo de Bagé (Caxias speaking to the people of Bagé), Reconhecimento de Humaitá (Recognition of Humaitá), Batalha de Itororó (Battle of Itororó) and Enterro de Caxias (Burial of Caxias). The Coat of Arms of the Duke of Caxias is displayed on the front of the monument.

== Installation ==
Initially, the municipal authorities intended to install the monument in Largo do Paiçandu, which would undergo extensive renovation to accommodate the memorial, including the demolition of the Church of Our Lady of the Rosary of Black Men. However, during the construction of the statue, they realized that there was not enough space for it in the square and a new location began to be considered. Brecheret envisioned installing it in Bandeira Square, next to the Aluminum Theatre.

In 1959, Princesa Isabel Square was selected for the placement of the statue. On August 25, 1960, the Monument to the Duke of Caxias was inaugurated. The sculptor Victor Brecheret, who died in 1955, was not able to see his work completed.

== See also ==
- Central Zone of São Paulo
- Tourism in the city of São Paulo
