= Fundadores de São Paulo =

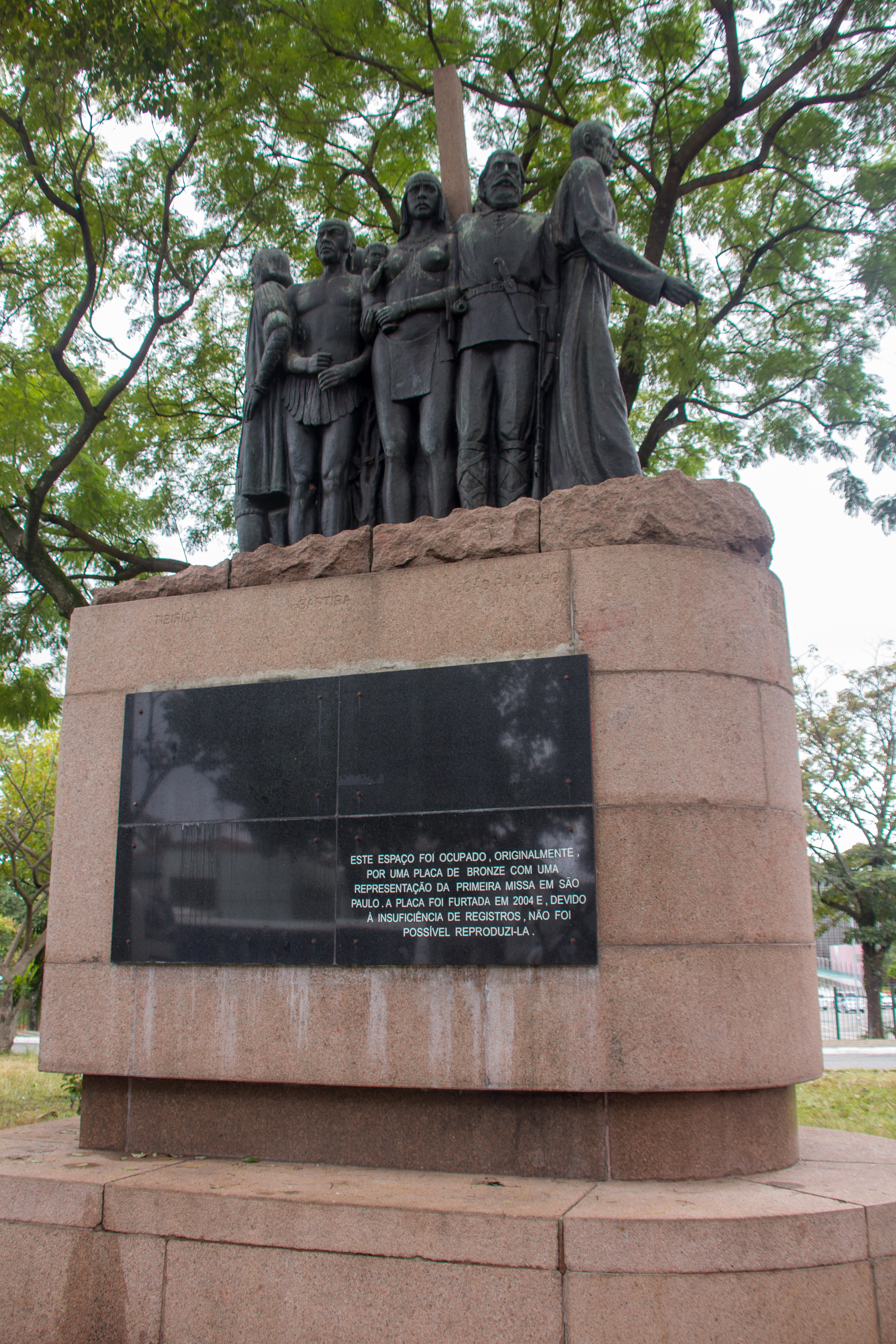
- 23°34′41″S 46°39′32″W
- Location: Vila Mariana, São Paulo, Brazil
- Designer: Luís Morrone
- Material: bronze; granite
- Length: 3.7 m (sculpture); 7.4 m (pedestal)
- Width: 1.7 m (sculpture); 5.3 m (pedestal)
- Height: 4.2 m (sculpture); 1.05 m (pedestal)
- Beginning date: 1952
- Opening date: 25 January 1963

Fundadores de São Paulo (translation: Founders of São Paulo) is a monument located in the Vila Mariana neighbourhood of São Paulo, Brazil. It was created by the Brazilian sculptor Luis Morrone to honour the city's founders, and after ten years of construction it was inaugurated on 25 January 1963.

== Description ==
The monument was created by Luis Morrone. It is located on Nábia Abdala Chohfi Street, on the corner of Sargento Mario Kozel Filho Avenue, near to R. Manoel da Nóbrega, in the Vila Mariana neighbourhood of São Paulo, Brazil. It is between the Ibirapuera Gymnasium and the Monument to the Bandeiras. It is located in front of Palácio 9 de Julho, but was initially installed near Praça da Sé until the 1970s.

There are nine figures represented in the work as bronze statues, three being religious (Manuel da Nóbrega, José de Anchieta and Manuel de Paiva), two Portuguese explorers (Martim Afonso de Souza and João Ramalho) and three indigenous people (Bartira, Tibiriçá and the boy Curumim). The ninth, a baby in Bartira's lap, is unidentified. A cross, in the center, refers to the Catholic religion. Two plaques on the granite pedestal represented the first mass in São Paulo and the foundation of São Vicente.

The main part of the monument is made of bronze and granite is 4.2 m × 1.7 m × 3.7 m (13.8 ft × 5.6 ft × 12.1 ft) in size. It sits on a granite pedestal measuring 1.05 m × 5.3 m × 7.4 m (3.4 ft × 17.4 ft × 24.3 ft). The cross in the centre was 2 metres (6.6 ft) tall.

== History ==
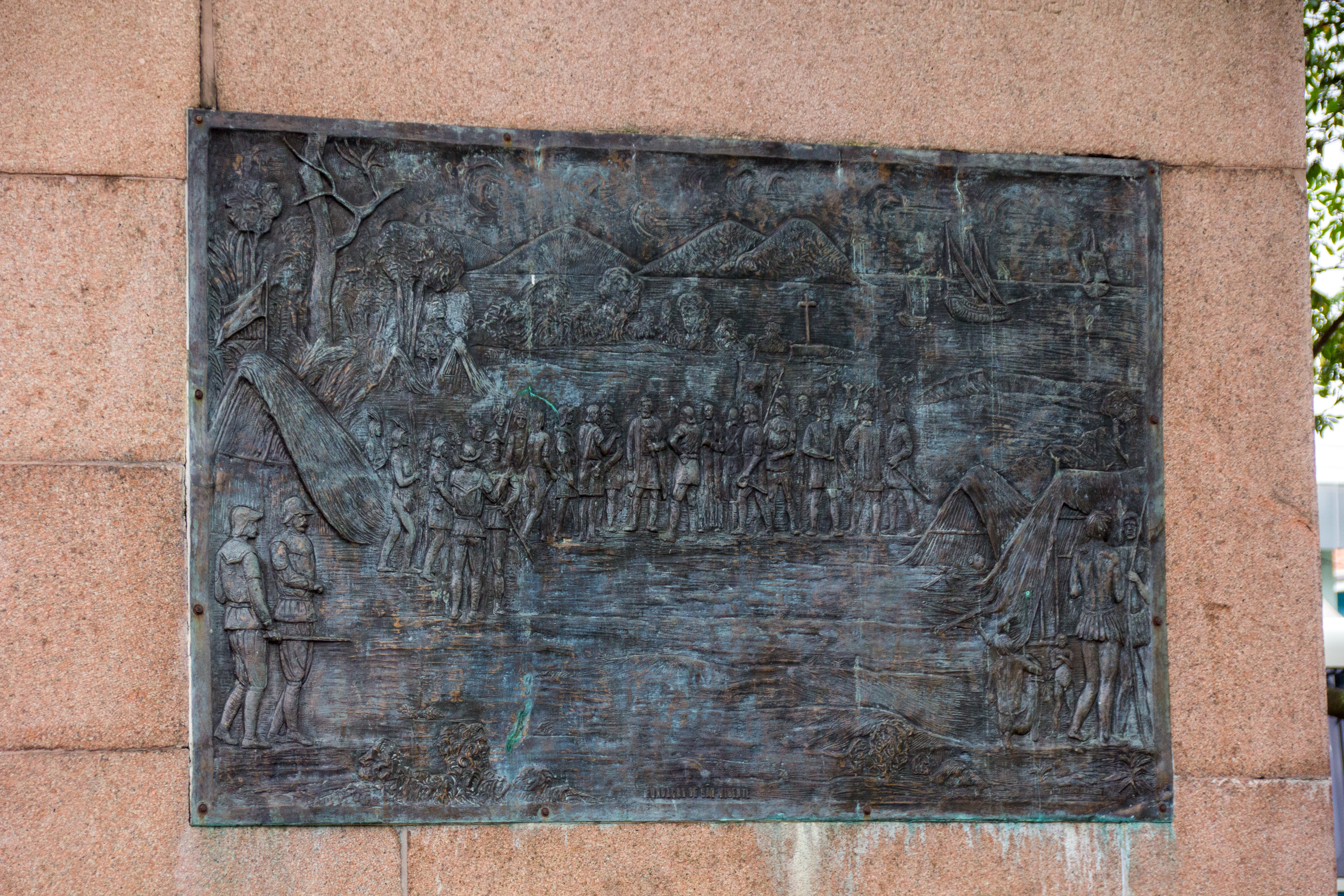
The surviving plaque, showing the foundation of São Vincente

Construction of the monument started with the laying of the cornerstone on 18 October 1952, the anniversary of the death of Nóbrega, and it was completed by 1962. It was inaugurated on 25 January 1963, on the anniversary date of the founding of the city.

The plaque showing the first mass was stolen in 2004: since no known photographs of it exist, it was replaced with a placeholder plaque noting the theft. The cross is mostly missing, except for the vertical pole, since at least 2016.
