= Church of Our Lady of the Rosary of Black Men (São Paulo) =

Catholic temple in São Paulo, Brazil

- Igreja Nossa Senhora do Rosário dos Homens Pretos
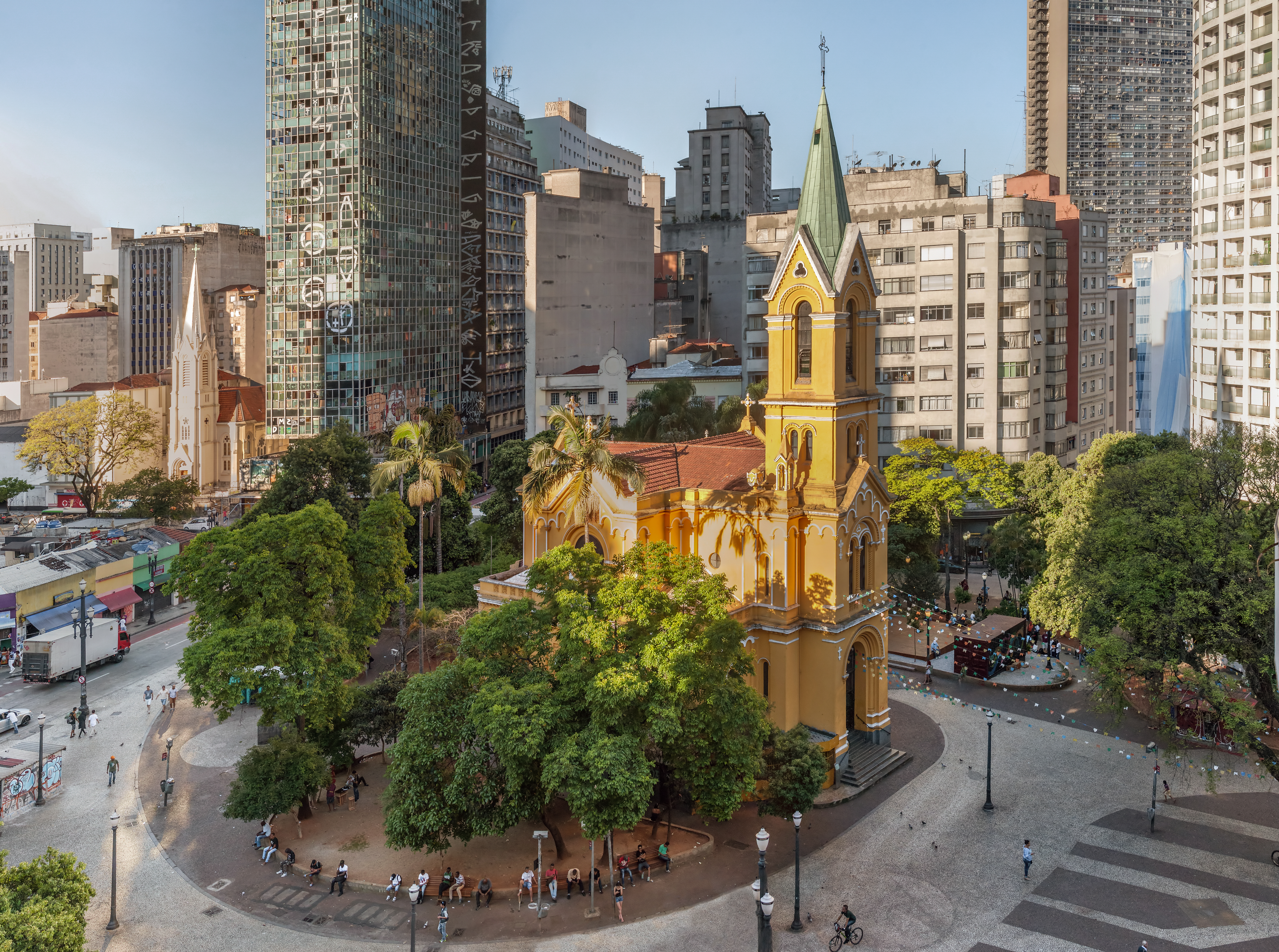
- Aerial view of the church.

- 23°32′35″S 46°38′17″W
- Location: São Paulo, São Paulo; Brazil

History
- Founded: April 22, 1906; 120 years ago

Architecture
- Architectural type: Eclectic

Administration
- Archdiocese: Archdiocese of São Paulo

The Church of Our Lady of the Rosary of Black Men (Portuguese: Igreja Nossa Senhora do Rosário dos Homens Pretos) is located in Largo do Paiçandu, in the central zone of the Brazilian city of São Paulo. It was originally situated in Antônio Prado Square, where it was built by black workers at the beginning of the 18th century to serve as a meeting place for slaves who celebrated Catholic rites mixed with beliefs of Bantu origin. In 1903, as part of the urbanization process initiated by Mayor Antônio Prado, the old church was demolished and rebuilt where it stands today. The new temple was consecrated in 1906, when a large procession, accompanied by a band, carried the images from the old church.

== History ==
=== The Brotherhood of Black Men ===
The Brotherhoods of Black Men emerged in colonial America during the period of slavery as a form of socialization, resistance and cooperation between slaves and freedmen. The figure of the Mother of God, represented by the rosary, was strongly represented in the cults of these fraternities due to the catechization of the slaves, which was being carried out by the Portuguese since the African coasts, and the communal adoption of a single saint based on the typically Bantu cult of a common ancestor.

The association of brotherhoods, usually very poor and without territorial possessions, was very common, as it allowed different religious associations to use the same temple. One example is the Brotherhood of Saint Ephigenia, which, being the largest and most prominent among the fraternities, was responsible for other smaller organizations. The current Church of Our Lady of the Rosary of Black Men, for example, is considered a dependent chapel of the Parish Church of Saint Ephigenia.

One example of the blend of Catholic and pagan divinities in the cults of black men was the substitution of the names of Catholic saints for those of black tradition; St. Benedict was called Lingongo, St. Anthony was called Vereque and Our Lady of Sorrows was called Sinhá Samba. This religious syncretism was necessary at a time when African religions were neglected by white men in Brazil (usually slave owners and plantation owners).

=== The first church ===
The first Church of Our Lady of the Rosary of Black Men was founded by the Brotherhood of the same name in the 18th century. Its history began in 1721 when the fraternity petitioned the then king of Portugal, John V, for permission to build a temple "that could solemnize the mysteries of the Rosary of the Mother of God". Although there are no records of a royal response, it is assumed that it was favorable, given that a process of fundraising for the construction of the church began in the following years. While they didn't have the necessary resources or official permission from the royalty, the slaves, forbidden to attend white churches, built a small chapel near the Anhangabaú River. At the time, the area was a suburb of the city known for its gatherings of slaves and freedmen.

The process of raising money began in 1725, when the hermit Domingo de Melo Tavares, a devotee of the Brotherhood of Black Men, began a pilgrimage through the state of Minas Gerais receiving alms on behalf of the fraternity. That same year, the association asked the São Paulo City Council for a plot of land to build the church on. The request was viewed favorably by D. Antônio de Guadelupe, Bishop of São Paulo, who helped them get the site. The Livro do Tombo of the Sé mentions the fact when it says that the Virgin of the Rosary was "placed by the poor slaves and blacks with all their devotion in the Chapel that they will build by the grace of the Excellency Antonio de Guadelupe". Since the fraternity, composed of slaves and freedmen, was very poor, almost all the elements that constituted the first church, such as furniture, wood, images of saints, fabric, tablecloths and embroidery for the altar, were acquired through donations.

On July 10, 1728, the land on which the first chapel was built was donated by the São Paulo City Council. Added to the 10,000 cruzados that Tavares had collected from donations in Minas Gerais, legal ownership of the land allowed for the construction of a canonical church. Work began that year, and there are records that it was not finished until 1737. The conclusion of the project was celebrated with a mass followed by a congada. The other registered mentions of the church date from much later times: there are two letters filed with the City Council in 1750 and, in 1783, it appears in a list of temples in São Paulo made by Manuel Cardoso de Abreu. On November 5, 1745, Tavares was appointed Perpetual Administrator of the Works of the Church of Our Lady of the Rosary of Black Men.

The old church, located on the corner with the current Antônio Prado Square, in the center of the city of São Paulo, was built of rammed earth and had predominantly baroque features. Its main facade was on 15 de Novembro Street and consisted of four windows, a tower on the left, which had a low window, and two doors. The other side, facing Largo do Rosário, had an entrance door to the sacristy and a window above it. The main chancel had six tribunes and an altar with a panel of Our Lady of the Rosary, next to Saint Roch and Saint Anthony. The nave of the church had four tribunes, two pulpits and two altars, one for Bom Jesus da Prisão, Saint Ephigenia and Saint Elesbaan and the other for the Sacred Heart of Jesus. The chapel of Bom Jesus da Pedra Fria was located to the left of the church, while the other side was occupied by the sacristy and an altar to Our Lady of Sorrows.

The creation of a church just for black people shows the growing number of slaves being brought to São Paulo and their capacity for association and cooperation. According to the researcher Fernandes, the creation of this church "constituted an entity for the union and mutual aid of the city's freedmen and slaves, also acting as a promoter of freedoms and participating in abolitionist activities".

==== Festivals and religious syncretism ====
The festivities held in the first church of the Brotherhood of Black Men revealed a great deal of religious syncretism between Catholicism and the African beliefs of the Bantu ethnic group, since most of the slaves brought to São Paulo came from the present-day Congo. The festivities were known for the election of a king, queen and court, the sale of traditional African delicacies, the mutual handling of Catholic rosaries and lizard or frog skins, guinea figs, goat's eyes and chicken feet, traditional elements of the Bantu religion, the staging of the congada and the participation of a large number of local residents, who always observed the festivities. The procession of Our Lady of the Rosary, the brotherhood's main festival, was characterized by music of several rhythms, such as batuques, sambas and moçambiques, the enthusiastic dances of women wearing white headscarves, gold necklaces and bracelets and rosaries of red beads, and the large banquets at the home of the king and queen, where cachaça and typical delicacies were served. As some of these musical rhythms were heavily repressed by the police due to complaints from residents and their association with African religiosity, the Kayapo dance was also adopted by the community as a way of expressing their religiosity.

The immersion of local residents in the rites and festivals of the "blacks of the rosary" was also marked by the appearance of the "escravos de ganho", who were freed blacks hired by small businesses to sell sweets, manioc, pine nuts, corn, fruit and vegetables around the church. It was also very common for humble huts to be built around the temple, where former slaves lived. Many historians recorded the participation of slaves in these festivities, which were seen by slave masters as moments of "relief from captivity".

The cemetery, built next to the church shortly after its completion, also played an important role in the religious life of that community. In the sacristy there was a bowl for washing the dead and a wooden coffin to transport the bodies to the graves, which was used in all the ceremonies, since the dead were buried only with sheets. The burials always began at dawn and were characterized by a religious leader who sang songs identified as being from candomblé, the accompaniment of the songs by those present and a drumbeat produced by the "mãos-de-pilão", who pounded the earth that was being thrown on top of the grave. Several records from the time relate the fear and apprehension that local residents had with these rites, as they would wake up at dawn hearing drumbeats, that were associated with paganism, and songs in another language.

=== Modernizing São Paulo ===
From the end of the 19th century and the beginning of the 20th, the city of São Paulo underwent a process of modernization that implied relocating the church to another site. In 1870, the then president of the province, João Teodoro, decided to demolish some old houses and expropriate the slave cemetery, adjacent to the old church, to create the Largo do Rosário. This was badly received by the brotherhood, because the cemetery had an important function in the cult of the dead, as they followed the Bantu African traditions.

However, the major changes came in the 1900s, when São Paulo's first mayor, Antônio da Silva Prado, decided to redesign the area to modernize the city. His project included: an expansion of Largo do Rosário, which would be renamed Antônio Prado Square in 1905, to improve the confluence of vehicular and pedestrian traffic in the center; the connection of the Historic Triangle with Pátio do Colégio; the afforestation of several squares, such as Luz and República; the renovation and widening of Sé Square; the construction of Patriarca Square and the Santa Ifigênia Viaduct; and the creation of gardens around the entire center.

In 1903, the City Council voted on law no. 607, which declared that the expropriation of the property of the Brotherhood of Our Lady of the Rosary of Black Men to expand Largo do Rosário was in the public interest. The compensation was 250 contos de réis and included the land in Largo do Paiçandu, where the church now stands. While the new temple was being built, the rites of the black men took place in the Church of São Bento de Pedra, located in Sé Square.

For some authors, the measure corresponded to a moral, disciplinary and hygienic sanction by the authorities, who wanted to repress manifestations of African religiosity and gatherings of people considered "savages" and "dangerous classes". Reports from residents of Largo do Rosário, complaining about the nightly singing of the blacks, who performed their funeral rites with beats and songs in the cemeteries, also reinforced the idea of moral sanction. This view can still be reinforced by the bill that emerged a few years later, which banned batuques cateretês in the city.

At the beginning of the 20th century, the area occupied by the old church underwent expansion and overvaluation. Several businesses emerged on the site and an increasing number of white, wealthy and aristocratic people circulated in the area. According to Casablanca de Paula, when analyzing what this modernization meant, "the 'benefits' offered to the city by the transfer of this black community were part of a tacit agreement between the elites and those who looked down on this ethnic group, considered inferior to the others". Another controversy surrounding the measure was that the brotherhood's old land was donated to Martinico Prado, the mayor's brother. The Martinico Prado Palace was built on the site, which was once used by Citybank and currently houses B3.

=== The new church ===
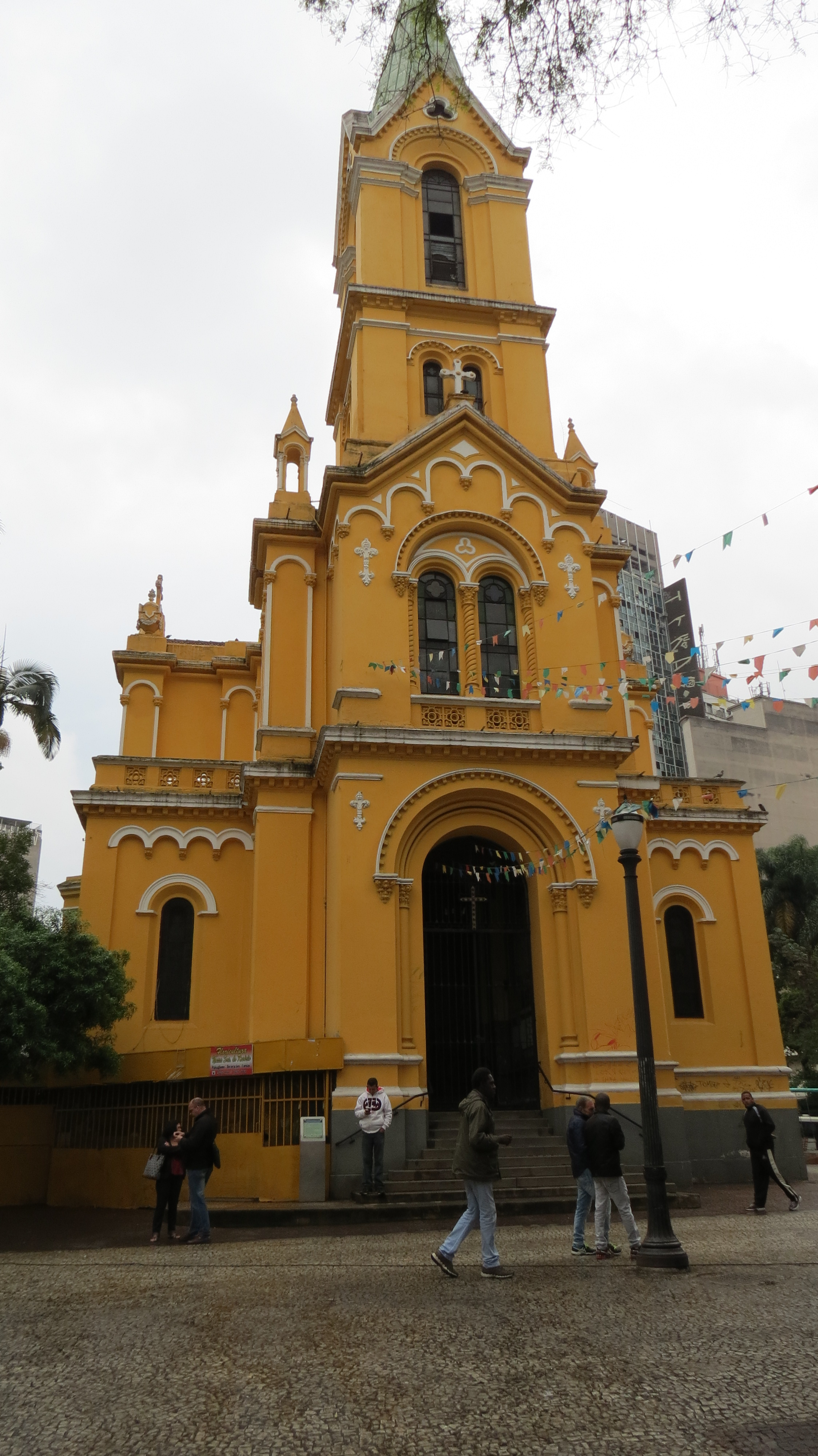
Facade of the Church of Our Lady of the Rosary of Black Men.

After the donation of land and 250 contos de réis, the Church of Our Lady of the Rosary of Black Men began to be built on July 24, 1904, in the current Largo do Paiçandu. The measure involved a lot of controversy with local residents, who claimed that a church in the square would detract from the beauty of the place.

Construction took a few years due to complications with the new plot of land, which was waterlogged due to some streams running through it. The roof of the new church was completed on January 7, 1905, and on April 15, 1906, the new temple was finished; this date was marked by Chaplain João Nepomuccno Manfredo Leite's blessing of the site. On April 21, six days later, the images were transferred from the Church of São Bento de Pedra, where the brotherhood was housed, to the new building, accompanied by a large procession, led by Maestro Carlos Cruz's band and welcomed at Largo do Paiçandu, in the Santa Cecilia district, by a 21-gun salute. The main figure in this celebration was the Blessed Virgin of the Rosary, its patron saint.

Among the images and symbols characteristic of the old church that have been kept are: the altars of Our Lady of Sorrows; the chapel of Bom Jesus da Pedra Fria; a panel of Our Lady of the Rosary; and an iron cross that served as a point of reference for the former residents of Largo do Rosário.

The church faced another risk of being expropriated in the 1940s, when the municipal government planned to install Brecheret's Monument to the Duke of Caxias on the site where the temple now stands. One of the reasons for this choice was that the land had been donated as a loan, which meant that there would be very little compensation to pay. Unlike the first church, which was built by the faithful themselves due to a lack of funds, the new building was erected by the Rossi & Brenni company, hired with the money the brotherhood had received in compensation. The company was chosen through a competition promoted by the fraternity, in which interested parties analyzed the plan for the new church (designed by the town hall) and submitted their proposals to the association.

==== Monument of Mãe Preta ====
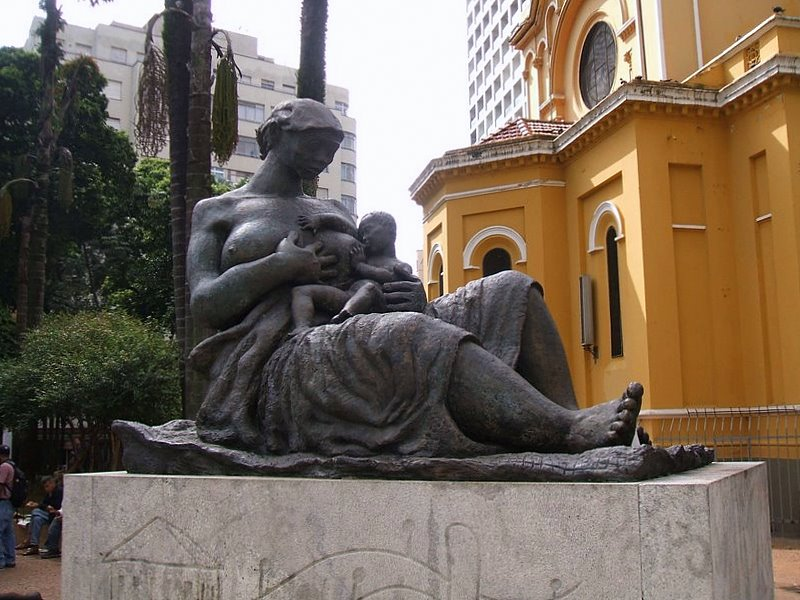
Monument of Mãe Preta by Julio Guerra.

Next to the Church of Our Lady of the Rosary of Black Men, in Largo do Paiçandu, stands the statue of Mãe Preta, designed by Júlio Guerra. Sculpted in bronze in 1955, the monument synthesizes the traditional figure from the colonial period of the black mother who served as a wet nurse for the children of her mistress or employer. Due to its strong imagery related to the mother, the statue is worshipped by a portion of the population, and it is common for flowers and candles to be placed next to the statue's granite pedestal. A railing was recently placed around the base to protect the image from darkening by candle smoke.

==== Modernization of religious festivals and ceremonies ====
Like the church, the religious festivals and ceremonies also underwent a process of modernization over time. One of the main people responsible for these changes was the brotherhood's secretary, later chosen as Notary of the Provincial Treasury, Tomás das Dores Ribeiro, known at the time as "Rabada". The measures taken by Ribeiro included a ban on chants to the orishas, especially to Shango, a ban on burial and drumming by the "mãos-de-pilão", the abolition of the use of the same coffin for all burials and the moralization, along Christian lines, of the collection of aid.

Other reasons that led to changes in the typical festivals were the growing sanctions of the state and the participation of whites, who were closer to orthodox Catholic traditions than to Bantu practices. In the words of historian Lincoln Secco, "the congadas of the black men of the brotherhood of the Rosary were slowly being replaced by festivities that were less offensive to the good customs of white society".

Currently, the church offers daily celebrations with a priest who follows the Catholic liturgical calendar. Every two months, there are special masses with remnants of Afro-Brazilian culture, such as chants and offerings of popcorn, corn, beans and sweet potatoes. There is also the Feast of the Rosary, held every year in October, which includes a mass, procession and the ritual of electing the king and queen of the Congo.

== Architectural features ==
The simplicity of the church's features reflects the social class of its followers. Due to the combination of Renaissance, Baroque and Neoclassical elements, its architectural style is considered eclectic, a common trend in Brazil in the late 19th and early 20th centuries. The church's facade shows a robust, horizontal architecture, with lower towers and an arched main portal. There is a rose window and lancet windows.

The facade is clad in mortar and the current paint job is latex, while the porch and staircase are made of granite. The main access gate is made from metal and consists of two opening panels and a fixed panel. The main tower is decorated with fixed stained glass windows made of metal frames and tilting windows. On the back facade there is a service door made of wood with a metal grille, which gives access to the basement, restricted to the brotherhood's meetings.

The window frames in the basement are aluminum shutters and the wooden side door, which gives access to the sacristy, is followed by a metal door placed later. The interior has decorative painted walls and ceiling and a hydraulic tile floor. Some of the carvings and images in the inside are from the old church in Largo do Rosário. The monastery and columns are painted in scagliola. The marble railing is located between the nave and the high altar. It has a balustrade and gate made of ornate iron railings.

== Historical and cultural significance ==
=== Space of resistance ===
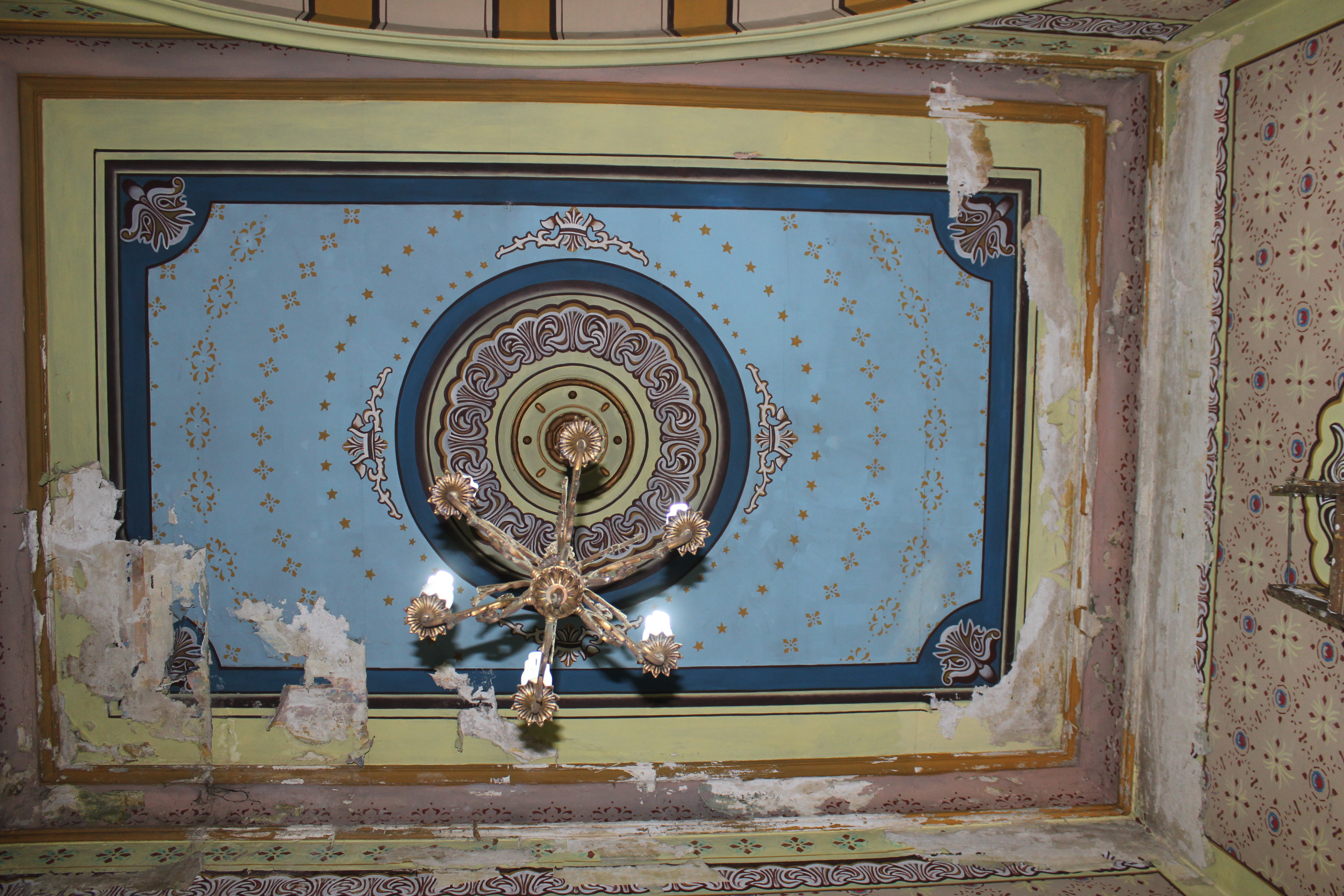
Roof damage caused by water infiltration.

The Church of Our Lady of the Rosary of Black Men is historically and culturally important both for its architecture, which represents a trend at the beginning of the 20th century, and for the space of religious syncretism and black resistance that it represents. According to Lima, "the festivals and batuques in honor of the Catholic saints evoked the matrices of African rites, which shows a way of resisting the violence of captivity and reducing the distance from the homeland". In a similar way, the church offered help to slaves, sometimes even facilitating their escape, and was an important center where blacks, marginalized and excluded, were able to come together and act jointly with strategies of struggle and resistance. Consequently, the temple can be interpreted as a reference to the religious syncretism that took place in the Portuguese colony and as a heritage of Afro-Brazilian religious traditions, due to the work it did to preserve black culture.

Nowadays, the church has also been the venue for important events dedicated to the black community. The Bonequinha do Café contest, the Aristocrat Club and the Black Front, one of the largest black political movements in the city of São Paulo, all emerged there. The temple was also a reference point for female participation in public life, due to the women who held the positions of queen and judge on the administrative boards of the congregation. As a result, the church became a landmark in the history of São Paulo as a point of struggle and resistance for the black community.

=== Heritage site ===
In 1992, the church was listed as a heritage site by Conpresp at protection level 1. The registry, which preserves the entire church, included a type of closed corridor on the right side of the building that could be visited by anyone who wanted to appreciate the rammed earth of the walls. In 2014, there was a conflict between the nuns who looked after the church and Memorial da Penha de França, a group that preserves the neighborhood's history, because the nuns had laid tiles on the walls, hiding the rammed earth.

== Current state ==
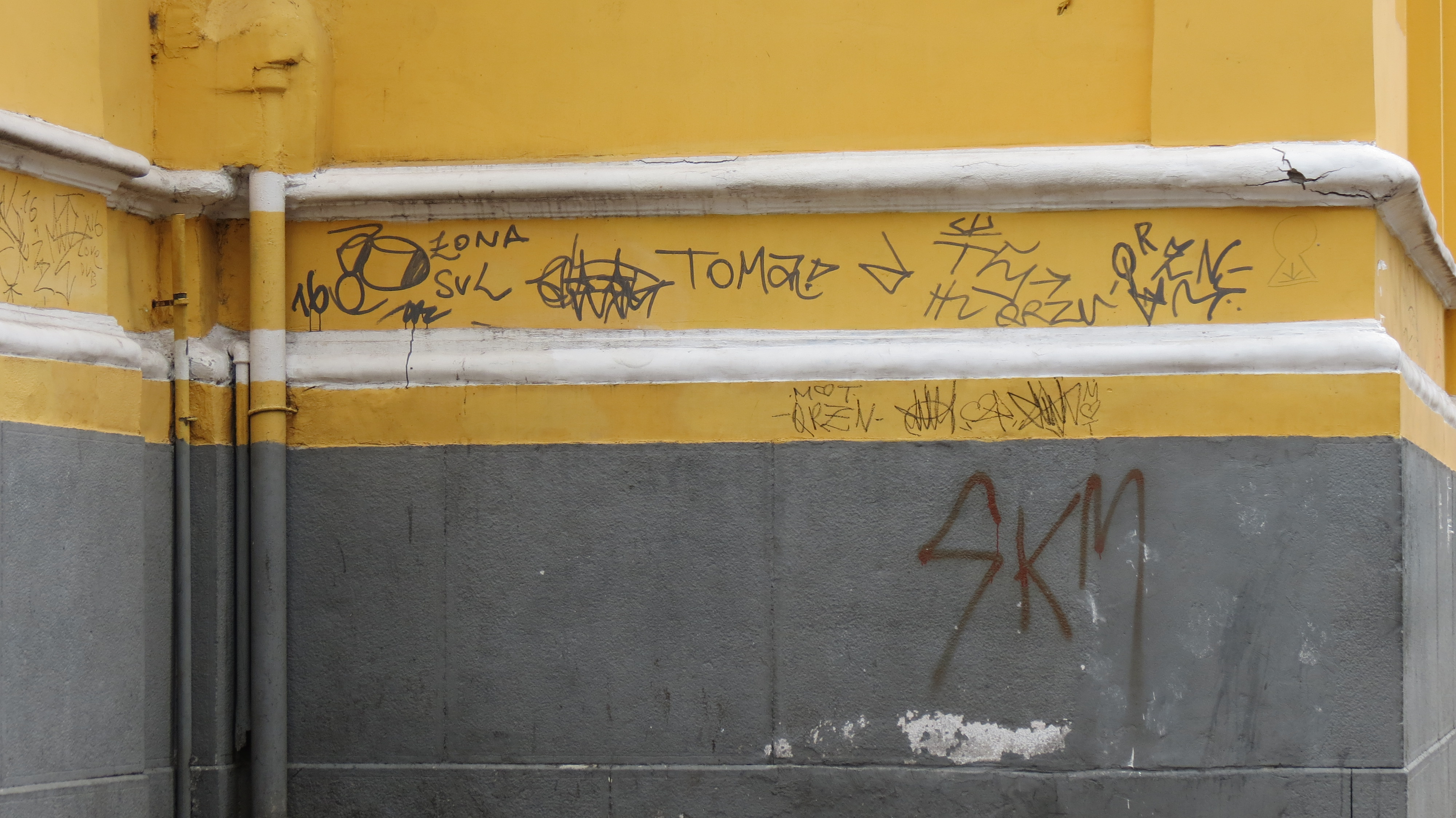
Graffiti outside the church.

The interior is relatively well preserved, with several figures from the old 19th century church, such as the detailed saints dressed in colorful embroidered robes. The walls and ceiling are still vividly painted and stand out for their infinite shapes, colors and textures. The least preserved areas of the church are some parts of the roof, on the left and right sides, which have been worn down by rainwater infiltration. Some columns and altars are also damaged by the effects of time. The paintings on the plinths and on the lower parts of the columns and walls have also been damaged, mainly by the contact of people kneeling to pray and the movement of furniture.

Externally, the church is in a good state of preservation mainly due to the Centro Aberto em Expansão project, which involved the City Council encouraging the Brotherhood of Black Men to preserve the external paintwork. On the outside, there is only one broken window in the main tower and some graffiti on the lower parts of the church.

== Gallery ==
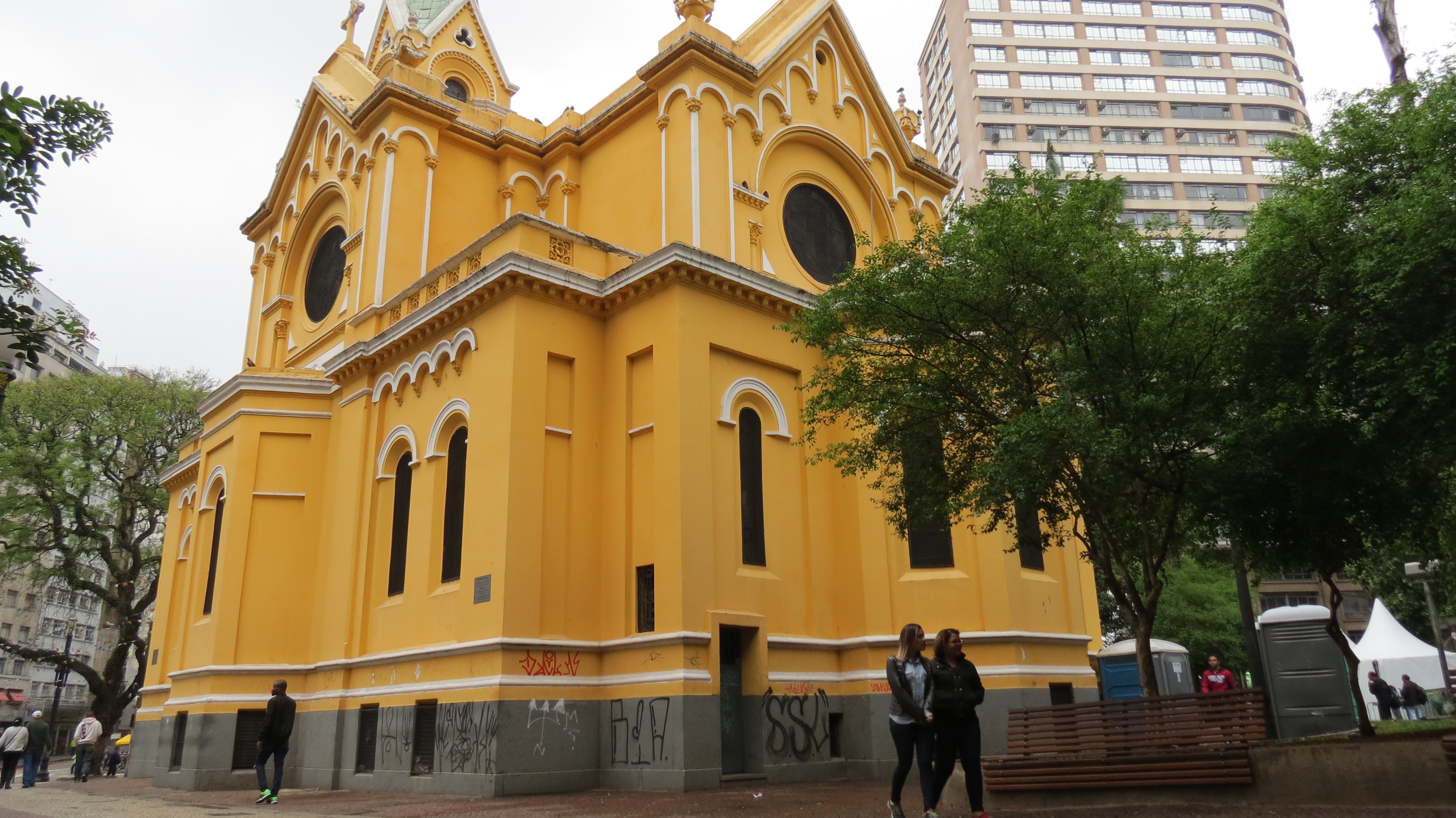
Side view of the church.

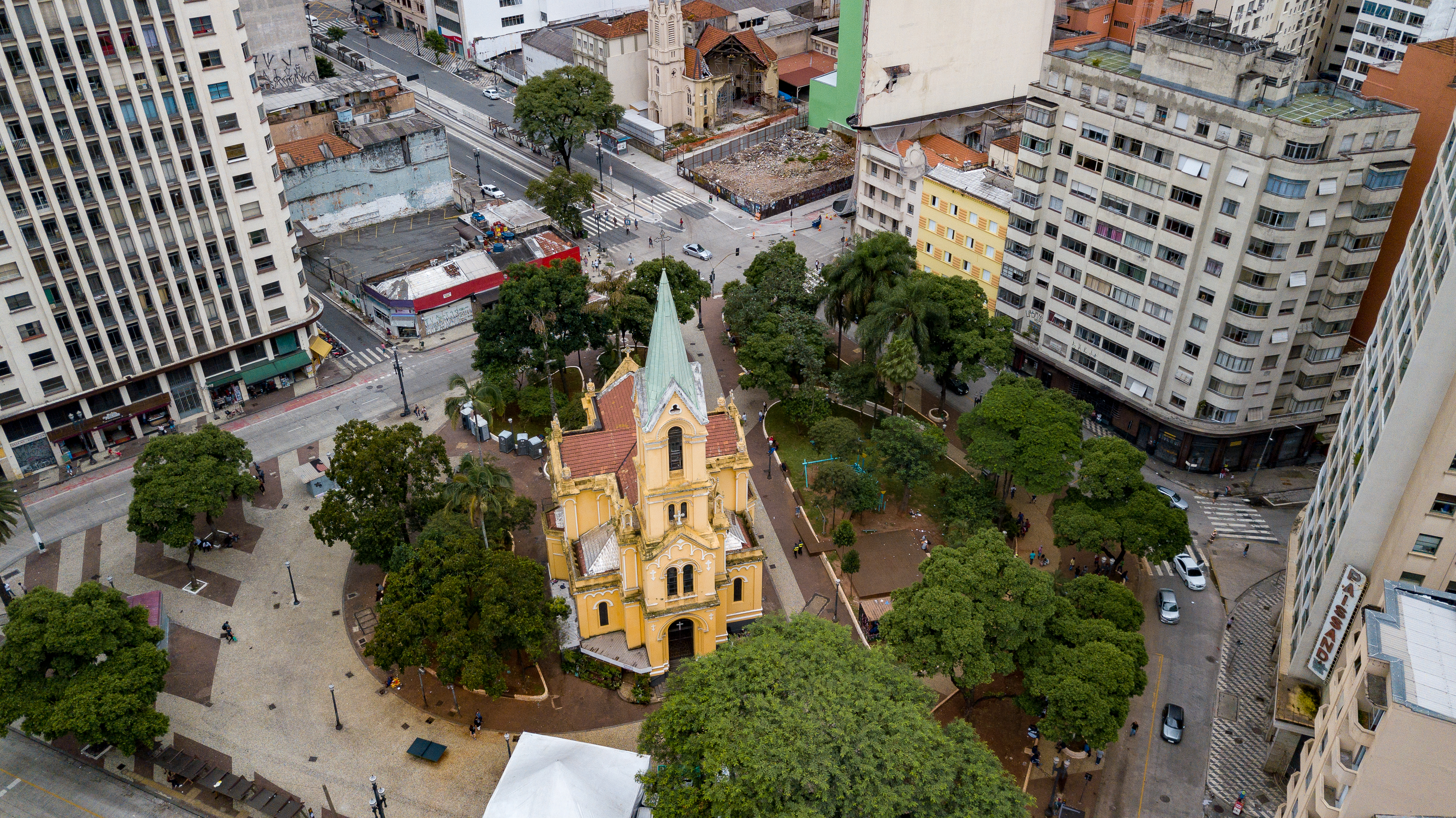
Aerial view of the church.

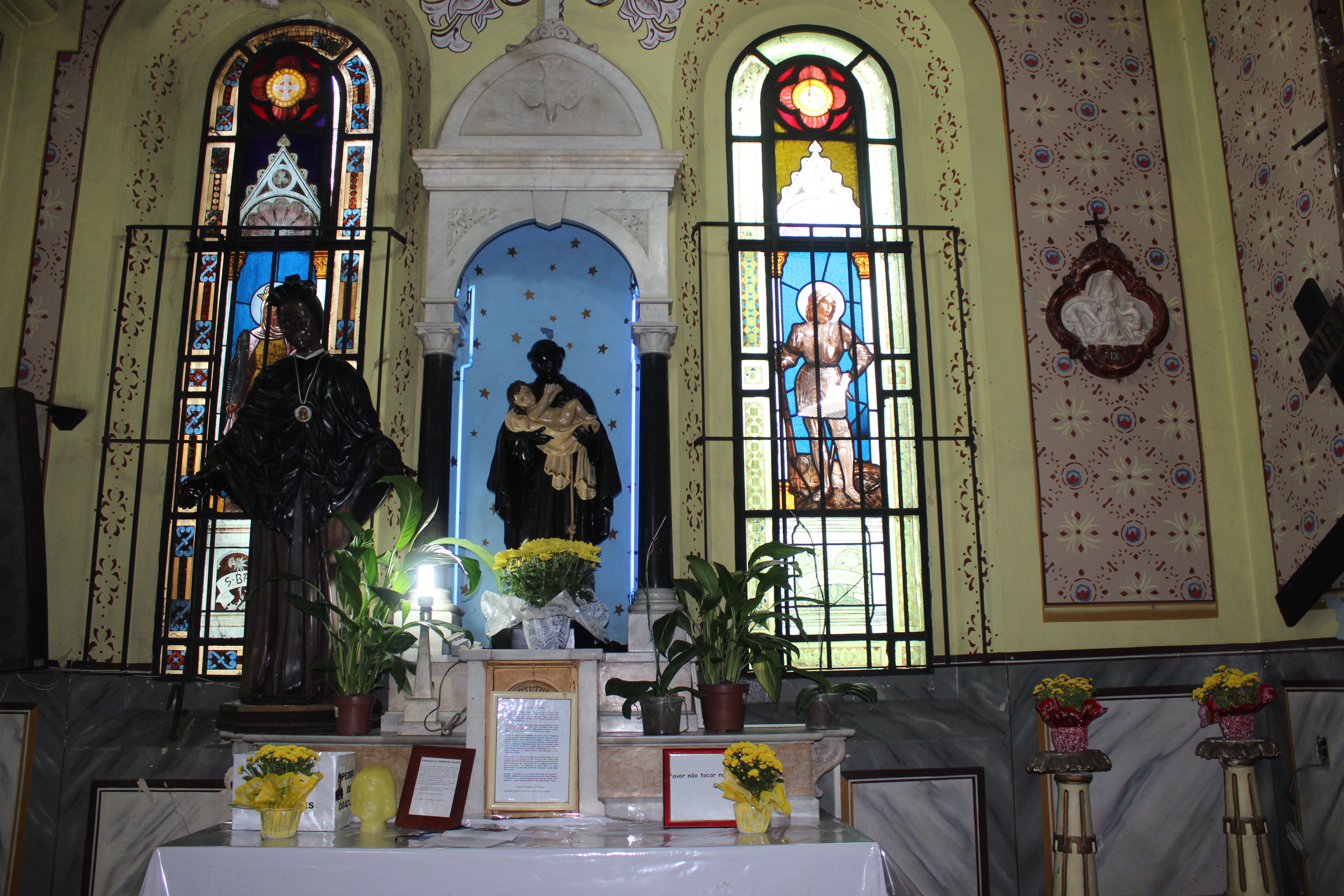
Altar of the black saints.

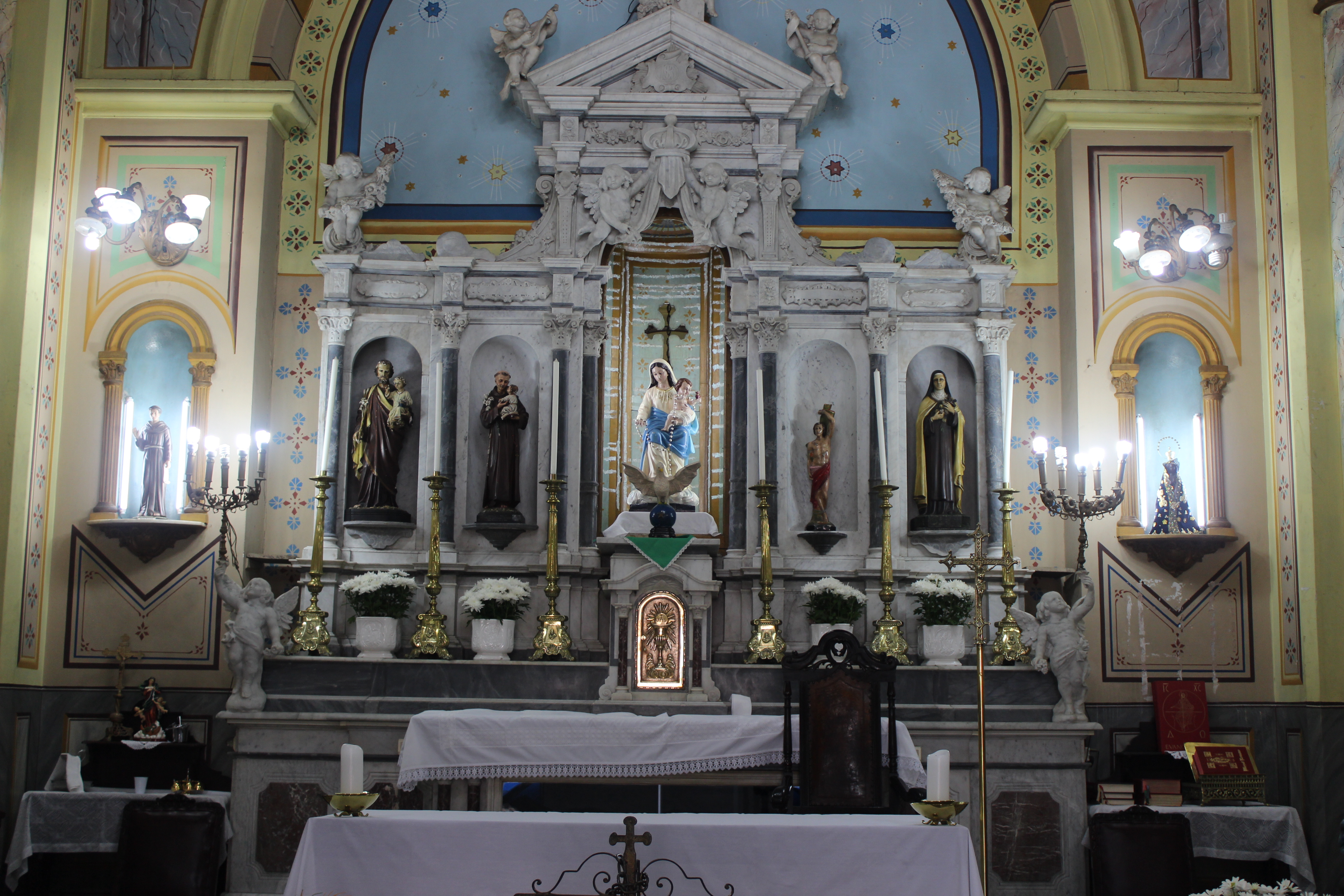
Main altar.

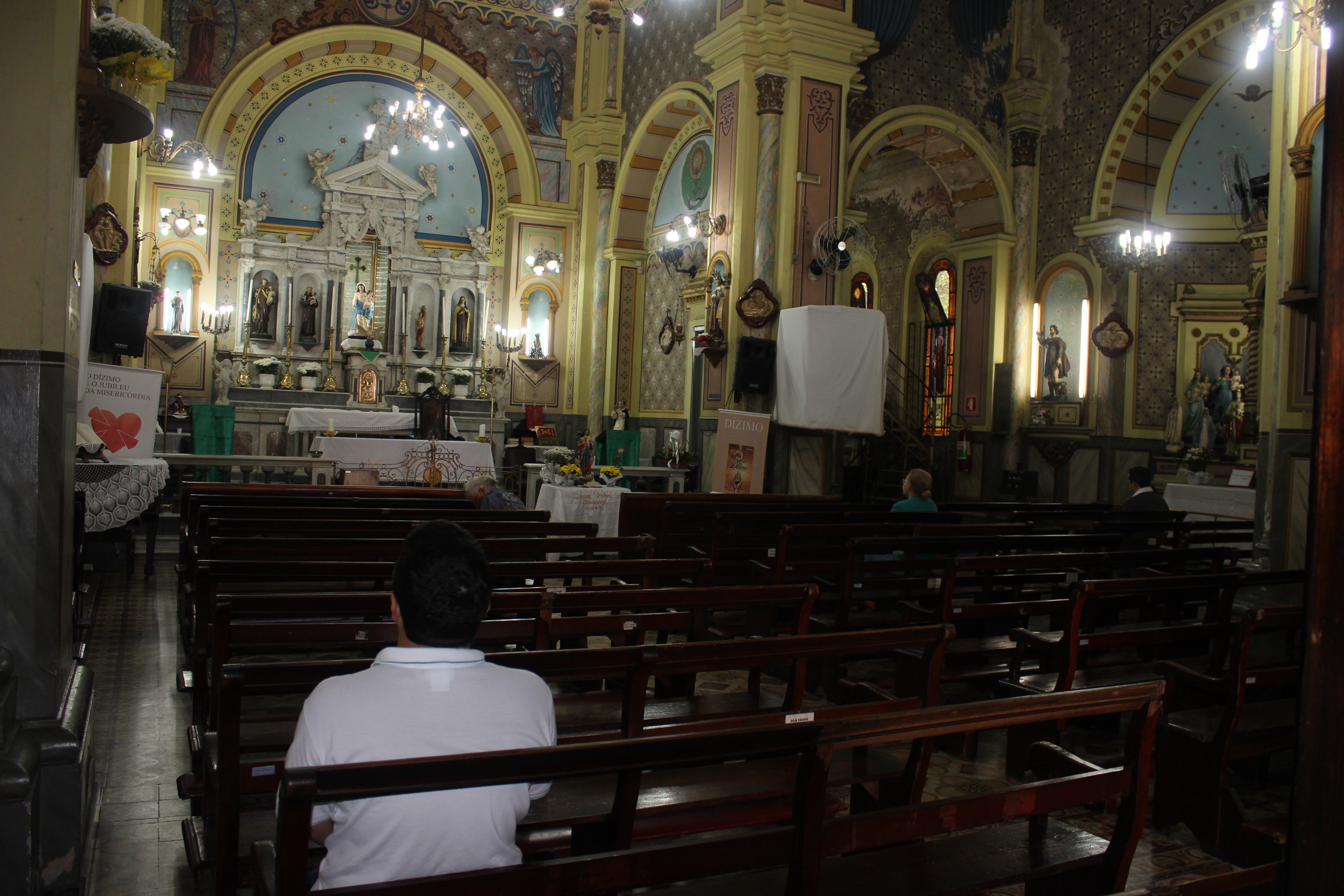
View from the church entrance.

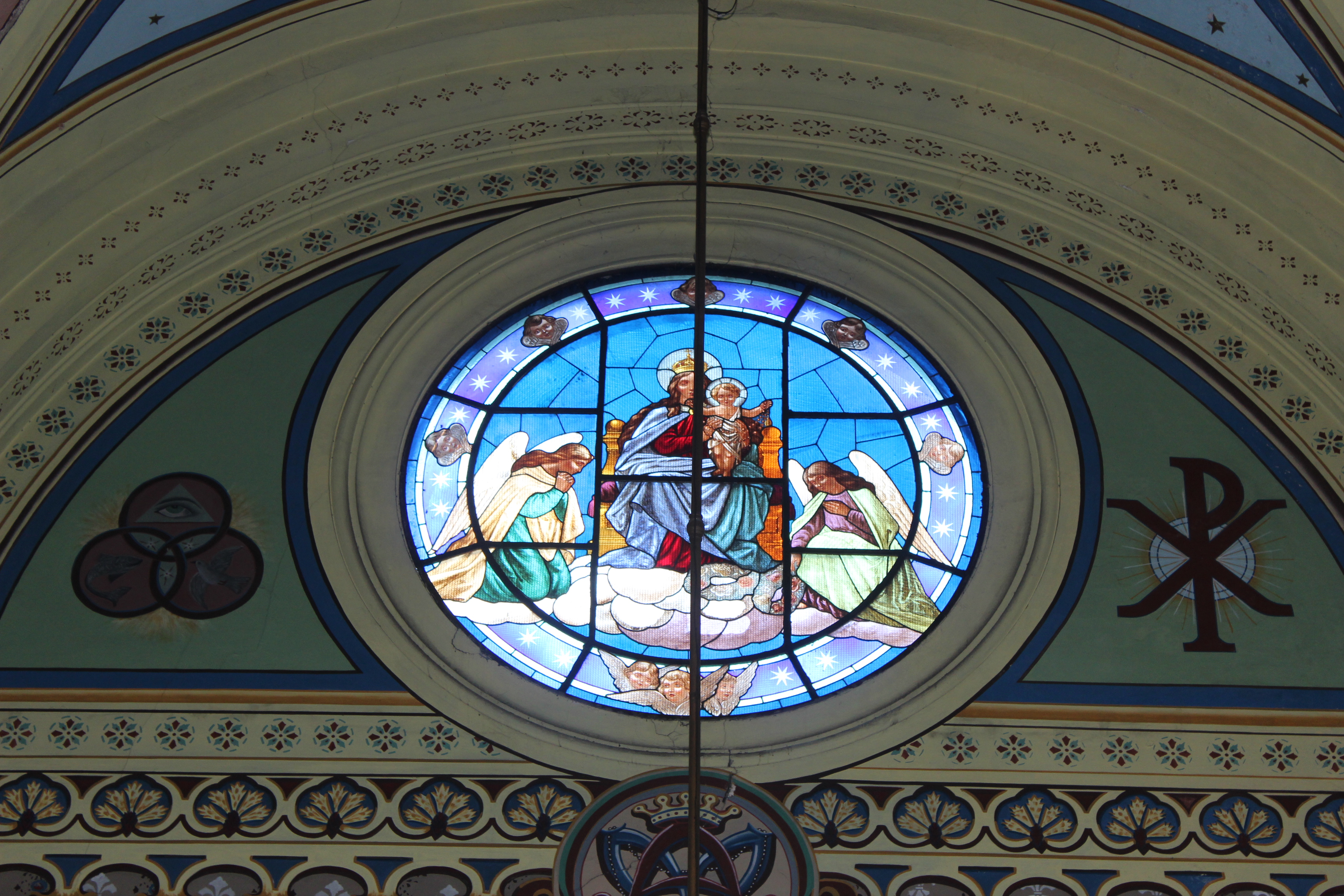
Church's central rose window.

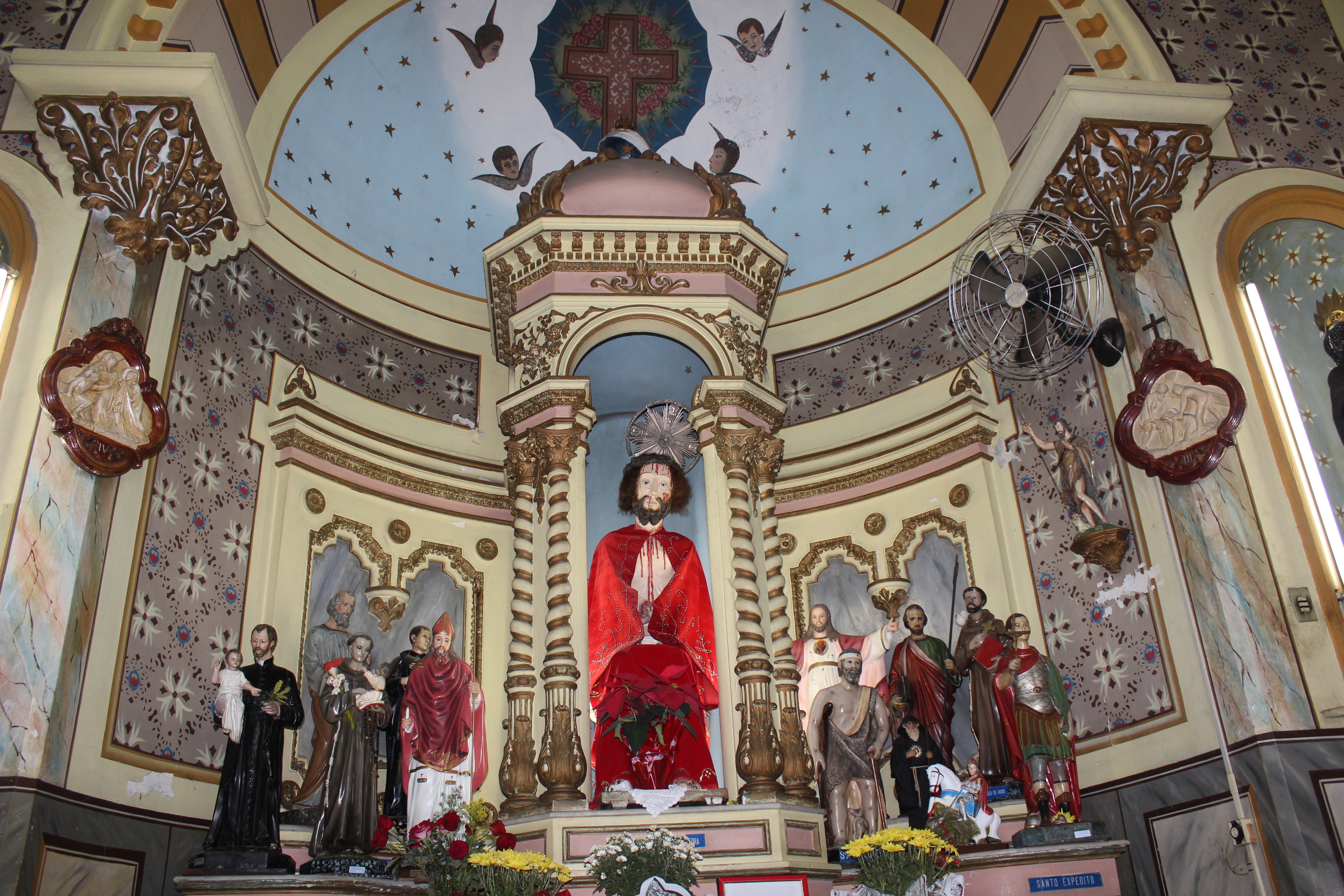
Side chapel.

== See also ==
- Tourism in the city of São Paulo
- Historic Center of São Paulo
- Bantu peoples
