= Galeria do Rock =

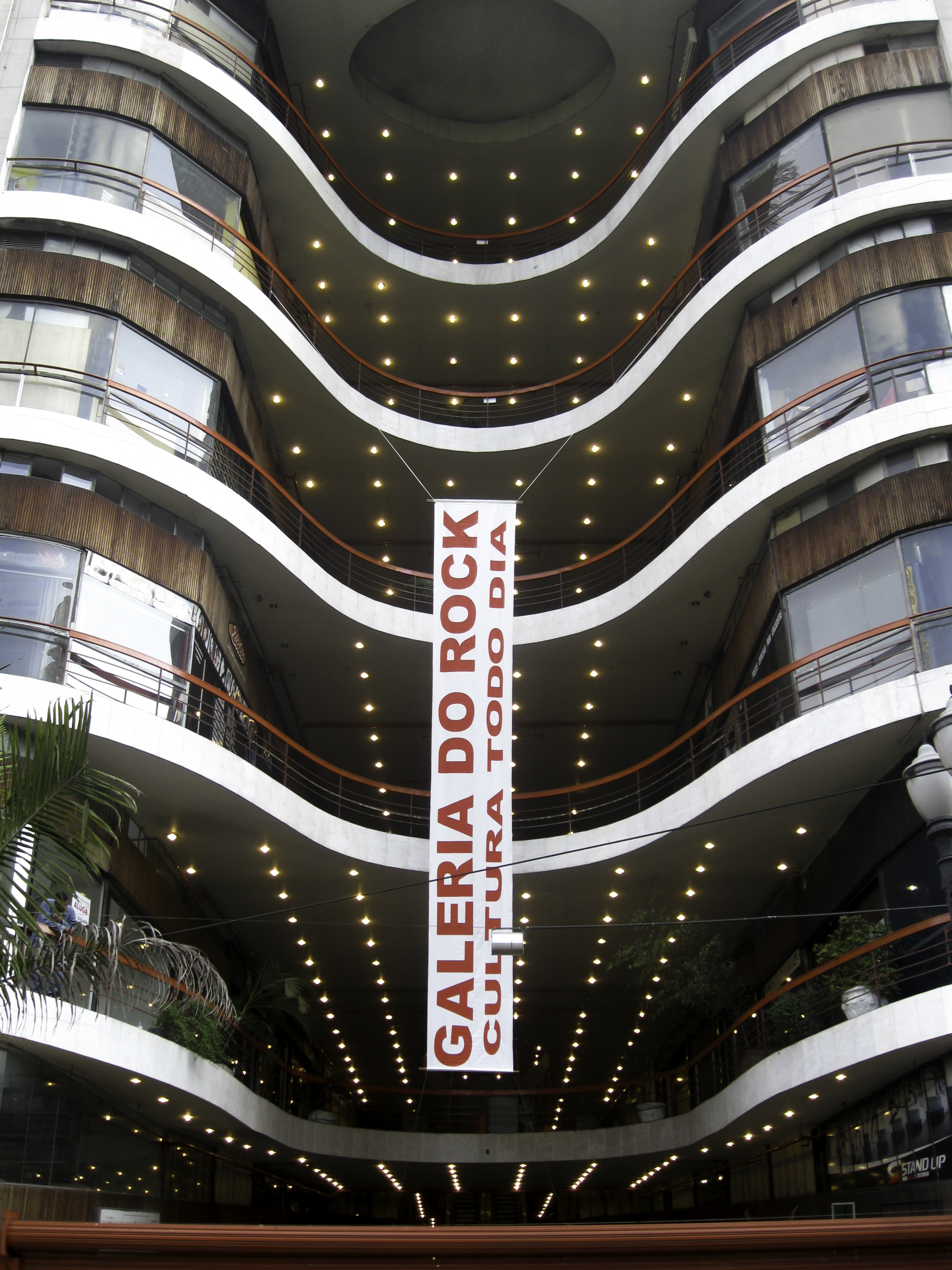
- Galeria do Rock, in São Paulo
- Interactive map of the Galeria do Rock area
- Former names: Shopping Center Grandes Galerias

General information
- Type: Shopping mall
- Architectural style: Eclectic
- Location: Avenida São João 439; Centre, São Paulo
- Coordinates: 23.543774°S 46.638779°W
- Completed: 1962

Design and construction
- Architects: Siffredi & Bardelli

Galeria do Rock is a shopping mall located in the city of São Paulo. It was established in 1963, with the name of Shopping Center Grandes Galerias. Located between Rua 24 de Maio, 62 and Largo do Paissandu (Avenida São João), it has 450 shopping facilities, with predominance of rock, hip hop and other music-related stores, which sell records, apparel and tattoo studios. Galeria do Rock is also a musical performance venue, being a meeting place for urban tribes or subcultures in São Paulo. The place was a location for the Rede Globo telenovela Tempos Modernos and for the TV series Aline.

== Edifício Grandes Galerias ==
The building was erected in 1962, by Alfredo Mathias S.A. construction company, with project by Siffredi & Bardelli architecture studio. It is listed as a cultural relevance site by the city secretary of historic heritage, Conpresp.
