= Victor Brecheret =

Italian-Brazilian sculptor (1894–1955)

- Vittorio Breheret
- Born: December 15, 1894; Farnese, Latium
- Died: December 17, 1955 (aged 61); São Paulo, Brazil

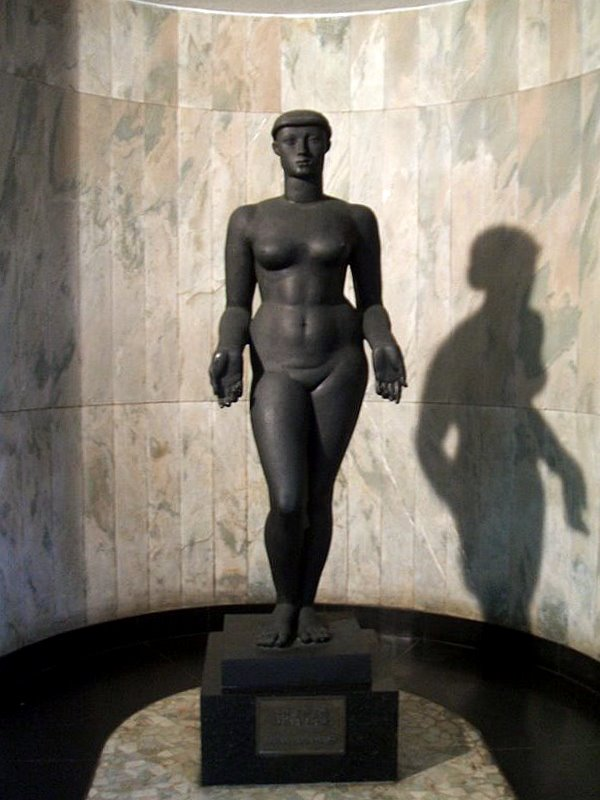
Grace, Prestes Maia Gallery, São Paulo

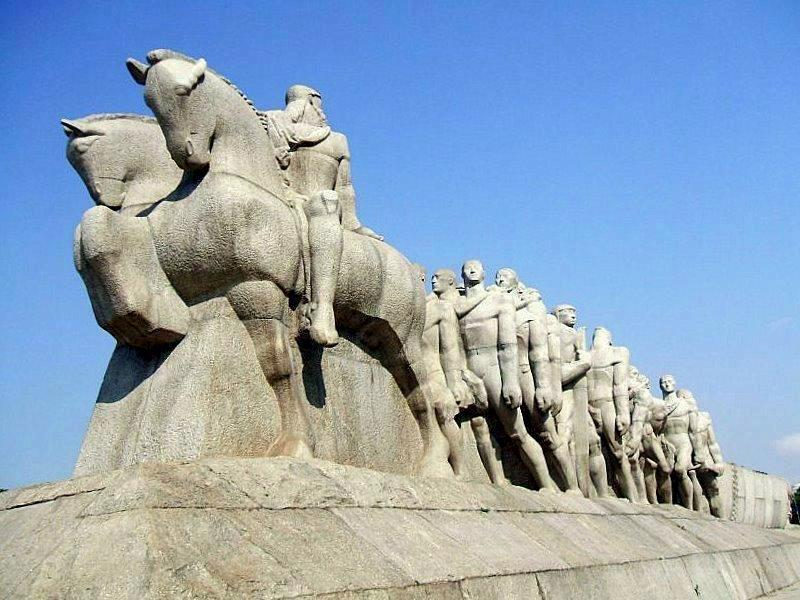
The Monument to the Bandeiras, a stone sculpture group by Brecheret, located in São Paulo

Victor Brecheret, born Vittorio Breheret (December 15, 1894 – December 17, 1955), was an Italian-Brazilian sculptor. He lived most of his life in São Paulo, except for his studies in Paris in his early twenties. Brecheret's work combines techniques of European modernist sculpture with references to his native country through the physical characteristics of his human forms and visual motifs drawn from Brazilian folk art. Many of his subjects are figures from the Bible or classical mythology.

== Biography ==
Brecheret was one of the first Brazilian modernists to achieve success. In 1921 his sculpture Eve was acquired by the São Paulo city hall. In 1922 his work was exhibited in the foyer of the Municipal Theatre during the Week of Modern Art (Semana de Arte Moderna). His O Grupo was acquired by the French government in 1934 for the Musée du Jeu de Paume; it was later moved to the public library at La Roche-sur-Yon, where it remains on display. His best-known work, the massive Monument to the Banderas (Monumento às Bandeiras) at the entrance of Ibirapuera Park in São Paulo, was proposed (in the form of a plaster miniature) in 1920, begun in 1936, and completed on January 25, 1953.

=== Birthplace controversy ===
Brecheret's Brazilian birth certificate lists his birthplace as São Paulo. This Brazilian record, though, was made in 1930 when the sculptor was already 36 years old upon his own request. Daisy Peccinini, Brecheret's biographer, maintains that he was in fact born in Farnese, Italy, based on the original birth register (pictured right) made only four days after his birth. A second-leval judicial sentence from the State Court of São Paulo issued on October 15, 2014 corroborates that Brecheret was born in Italy and emigrated to Brazil in 1904 with his maternal uncle Enrico Nanni.

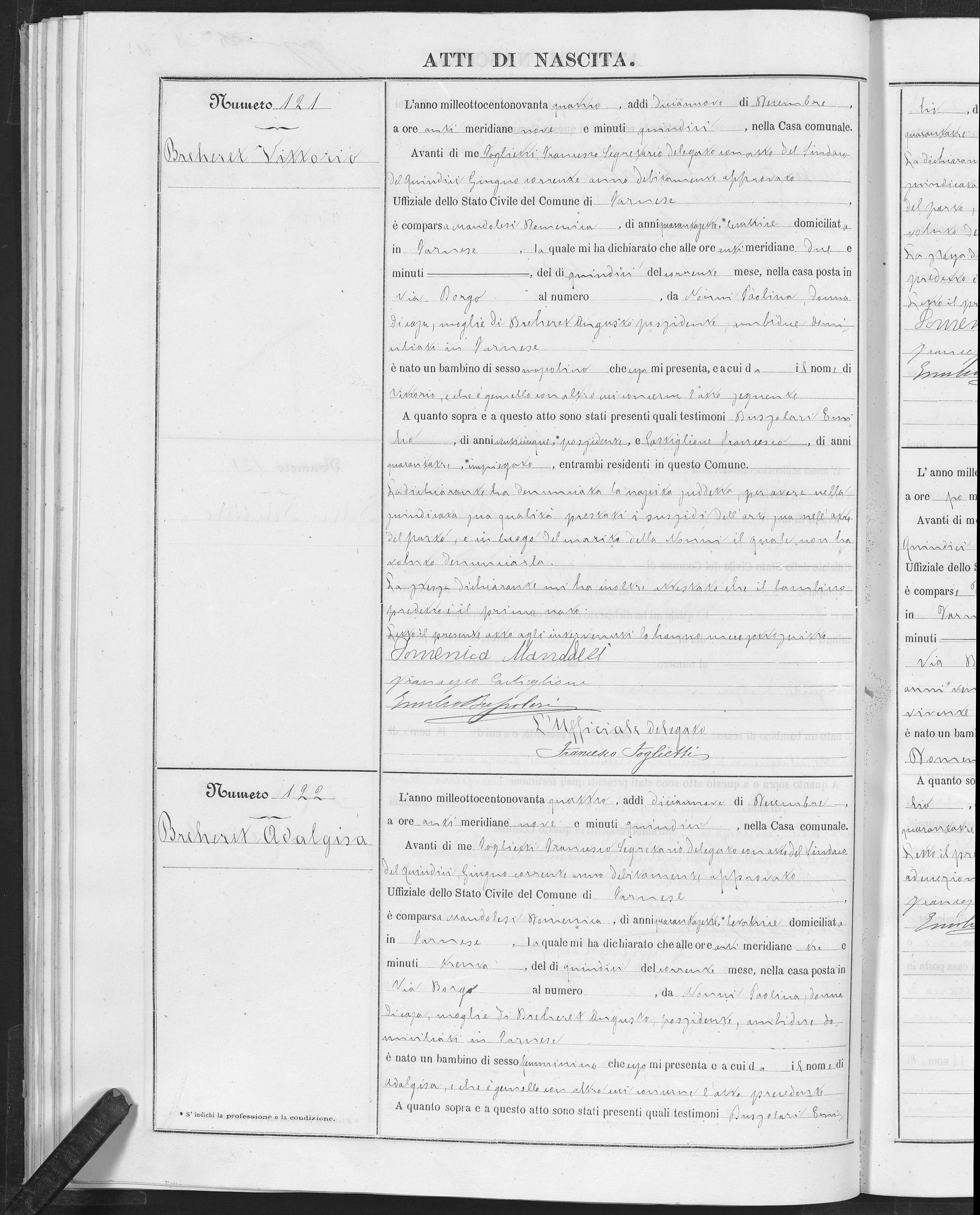
Birth record of Vittorio Breheret - Ministero per i Beni Culturali

== See also ==
- Prêmio Saci
- Monument to the Duke of Caxias

== Bibliography ==
- PECCININI, Daisy; Brecheret - A Linguagem das Formas; São Paulo: Ed. Instituto Victor Brecheret, 2004.
