= Largo do Paiçandu =

Region in São Paulo, Brazil

Coordinates: 23°32′35″S 46°38′17″W

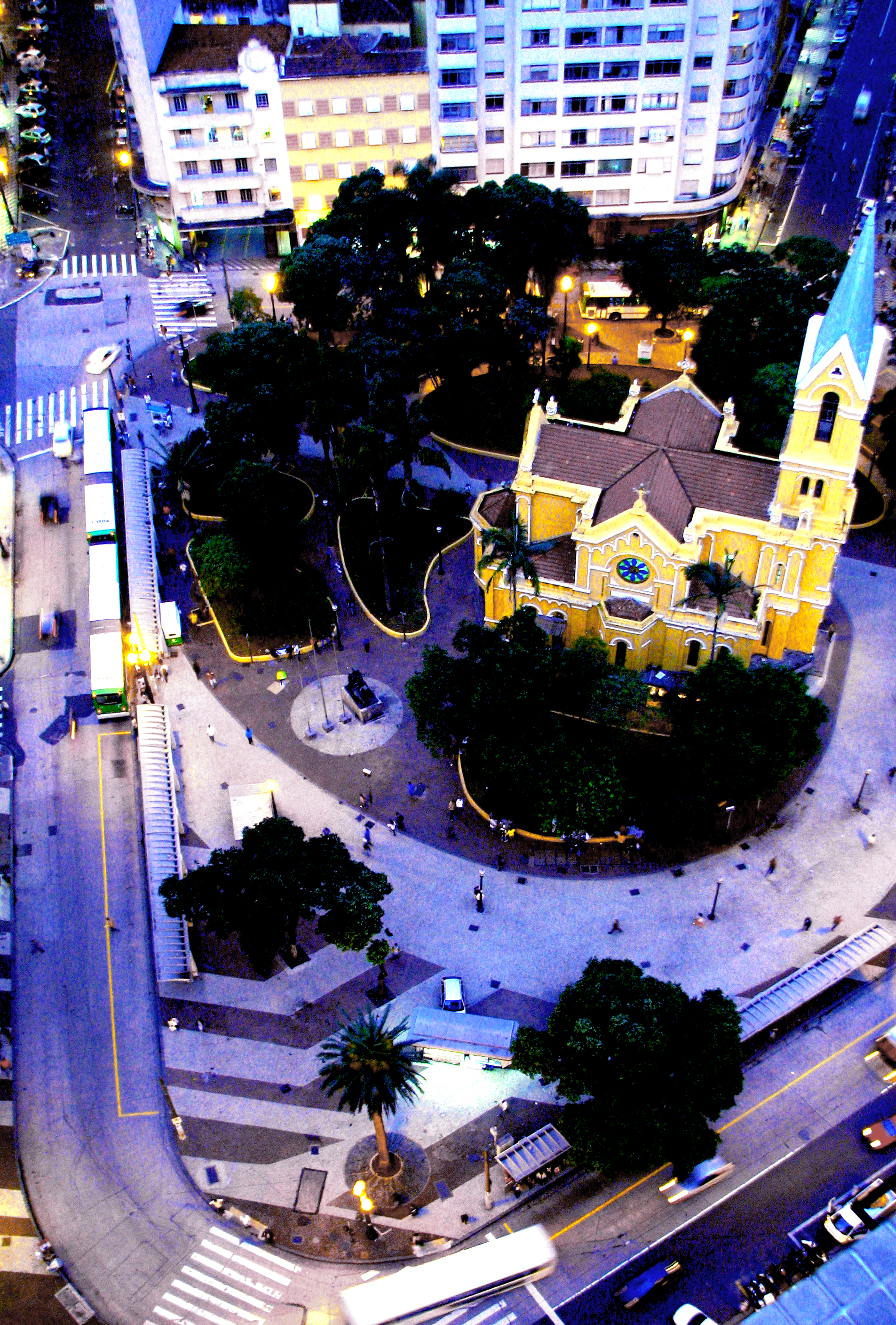
- Panorama of the square, with the Church of Our Lady of the Rosary on the right.
- Location: São Paulo, São Paulo; Brazil

Largo do Paiçandu (in archaic spelling, Largo do Payssandu and Largo do Paissandu) is an area of the República district, in the central area of the city of São Paulo, Brazil. It was named in 1865 after the Siege of Paysandu. (Note: According to the current orthographic norms of the Portuguese language, this place name should be spelled Paiçandu, since the use of the letter "ç" for words of indigenous origin is required. Over the years, the official spelling has been changed to Pay'sandu, Paysandu, Payssandu, Paissandu, Paissandú, Paissandu, Paiçandu.) Currently, it It is located within a quadrilateral formed by São João, Conselheiro Crispiniano, Rio Branco and Dom José de Barros streets. At the end of the 19th century, it was an important circus zone in the city.

== History ==
In the past, the Largo do Paiçandu area was home to a series of lagoons that extended into the Paiçandu and São João zone known as Praça das Lagoas. However, in the mid-19th century, by order of the city government, the site was desiccated and terraced.

In 1865, it was given its current name in reference to the Siege of Paysandu, a conflict in Uruguay between Allied and Paraguayan troops that preceded the Paraguayan War. In 1955, the Statue of the Black Mother, sculpted by Julio Guerra, was installed next to the church as a tribute to the Amas de Leite (slave women who breastfed newborn babies whose mothers had no milk).

Since then, Largo do Paiçandu has remained poorly valued, maintaining its peripheral character with low occupancy. From the 1920s onwards, with the expansion of the city into the Anhangabaú Valley and the formation of the Centro Novo, the Paiçandu area began to receive proper attention. In 1922, the famous Ponto Chic snack bar, a place of cultural and political turmoil in São Paulo, was set up. During this same period, the circus made history with the seasons of the Irmãos Queirolo and Alcebíades & Seyssel companies, all featuring the clown Piolin (one of the famous clowns of the Modern Art Week). After its reconstruction and vitalization, the area became a cultural and entertainment center, with the opening of the Polytheama Theatre in 1892 and the Piolin Circus, which was one of the main attractions in the area and became an important landmark in the city. Nowadays, the site's residential use is reduced due to the construction of large commercial buildings. The region lacks services for the working classes, with a high number of homeless people in the area.

On May 1, 2018, the former Wilton Paes de Almeida Building, located in Largo do Paiçandu, suffered a fire and collapsed, leaving several families who occupied the property irregularly homeless.

=== Café dos Artistas and Piolin the Clown ===
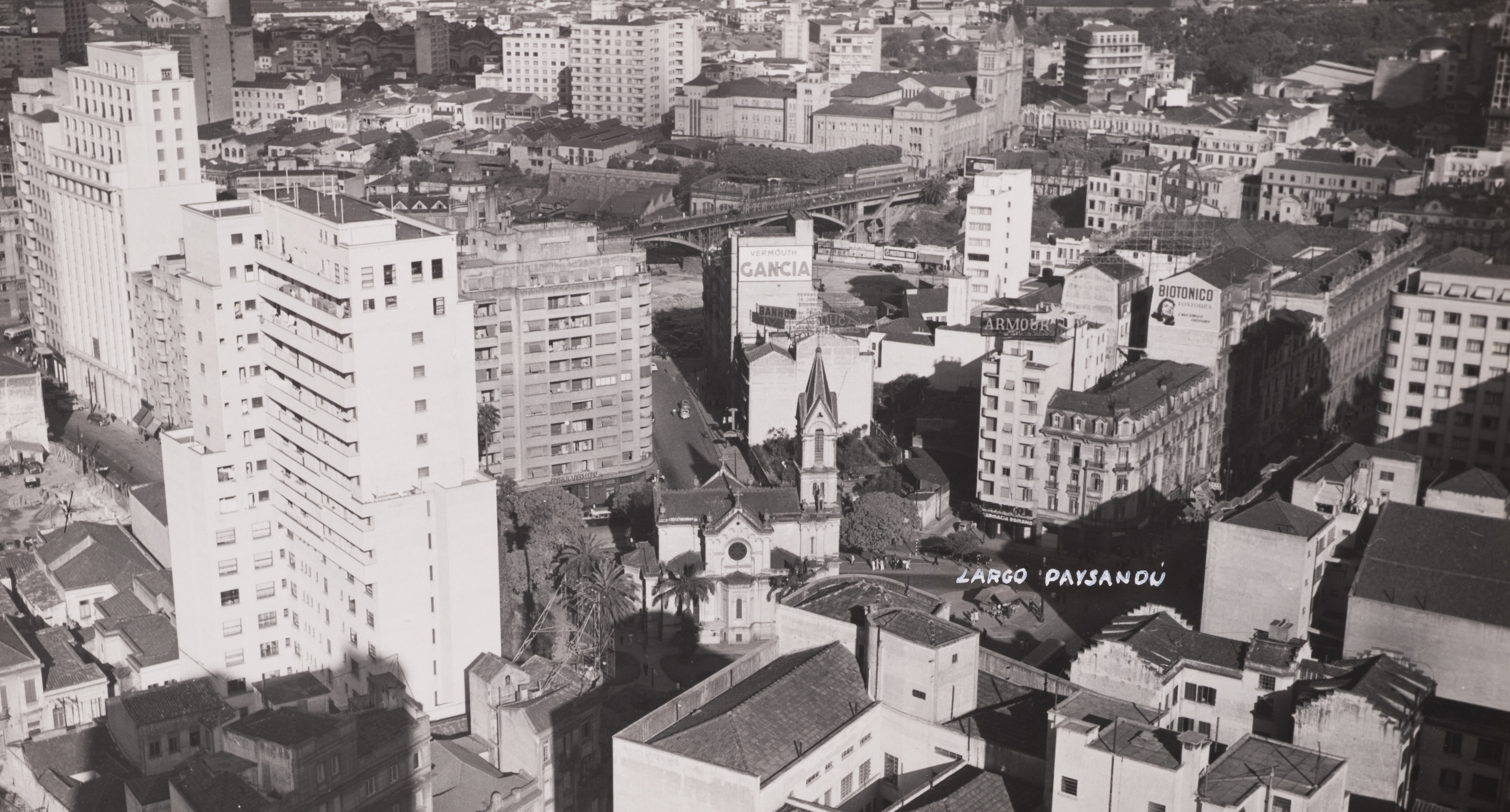
Largo do Paiçandu (1990s).

At the end of the 19th century, the Café dos Artistas became known for attracting circus businessmen and artists on Monday, their day off, in or around a cafeteria. It was held in Largo do Paiçandu because the venue was considered a reference point for artists looking for work and for businessmen seeking artists to manage. In 1920, the seasons of the Irmãos Queirolo and Alcebíades & Seyssel Companies, whose attraction was the clown Piolin, left their mark on São Paulo.

=== Cinelândia ===
At the beginning of the 20th century, between the 1930s and the 1950s, a large area characterized by its cultural aspect and great hustle and bustle became known as Cinelândia. The venue was famous for its cinemas of different sizes and for its series of establishments such as theaters, dance halls, nightclubs and cabarets that contributed to the place's fame.

== Etymology ==
The original name of the site was Praça das Alagoas, alluding to the several springs and lagoons that formed the Yacuba stream. From 1870 onwards, the largest pond was known as Tanque do Zunega, the name by which the area was renamed. With the drainage of the area and the canalization of the Anhangabaú River, the name was changed in homage to the conflict that took place in the city of Paysandu, in Uruguay, in 1865. The city's name is a reference to the palm species Allagoptera arenaria and Allagoptera campestris.

== Church of Our Lady of the Rosary of Black Men ==
The Largo features the Church of Our Lady of the Rosary, or Church of Our Lady of the Rosary of Black Men, which was built free of charge by black workers and consecrated in 1906, when a large procession accompanied by a band carried the images from the old temple in Largo do Rosário, now Antônio Prado Square.

The church holds annual celebrations for the Liberation of Slaves, on May 13, and for Black Awareness Day, on November 20. In some of these celebrations, in addition to Afro masses, there are also other events and programs, such as Afro fairs, Gospel and samba concerts.

== Galeria do Rock ==
One of the best known and most visited buildings in Largo do Paiçandu is the Shopping Center Grandes Galerias, popularly known as Galeria do Rock. With modern architecture, the structure is undulating, has four floors and stores with items related to the genre, such as screen printing, art, clothes, accessories, records and hip hop goods, skate stores, tattoo studios and hairdressing salons.

== Galeria do Reggae ==
Officially called Galeria Presidente, it became known as Galeria do Reggae due to its reputation as the home of Afro culture in the city of São Paulo since the 60s. Spread over four floors, visitors will find many record stores, tobacconists, skateboarders, as well as beauty salons qualified in dreadlocks and braids and cosmetics stores specializing in items for black and brown skin.

== Gallery ==
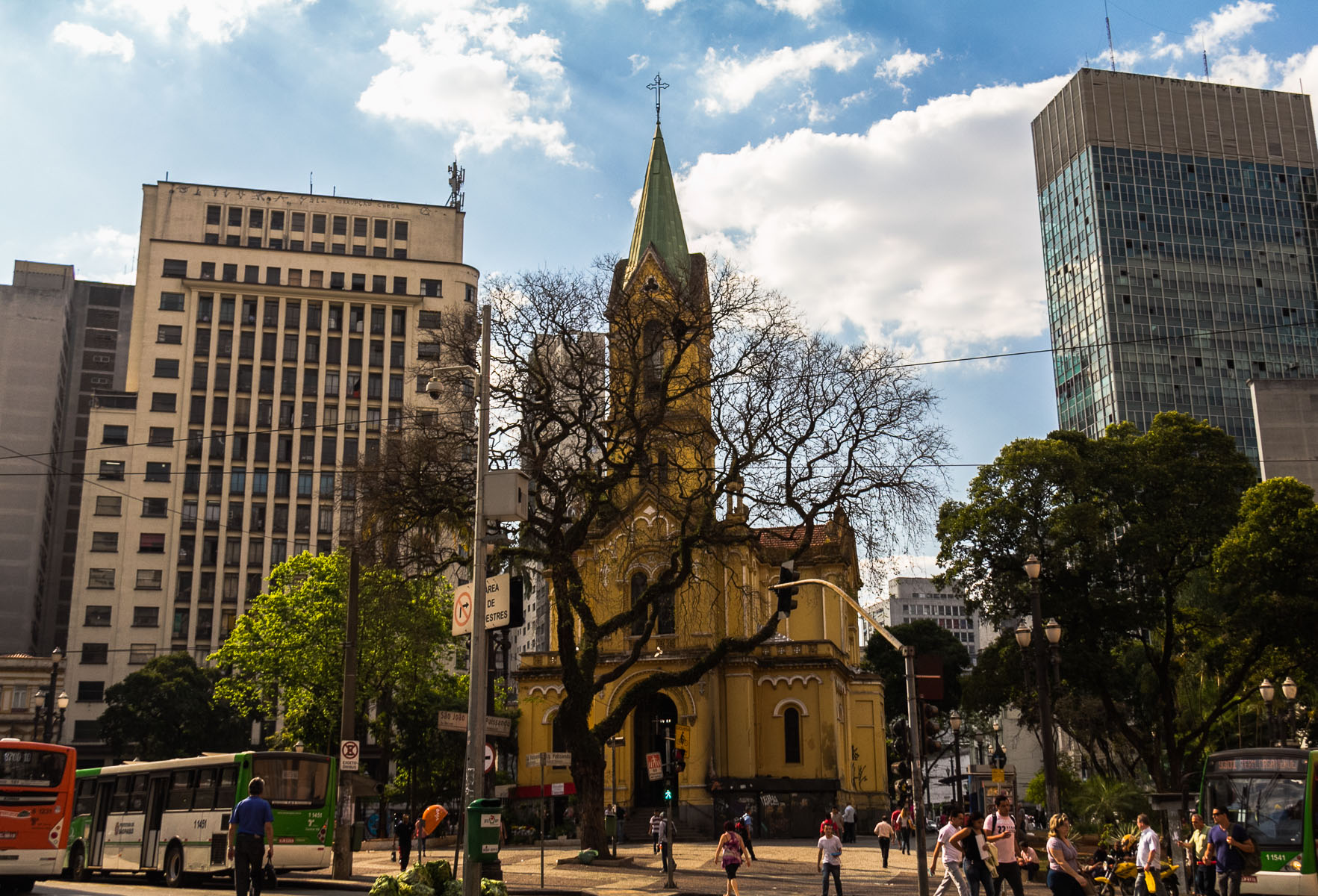
Church of Our Lady of the Rosary of Black Men.

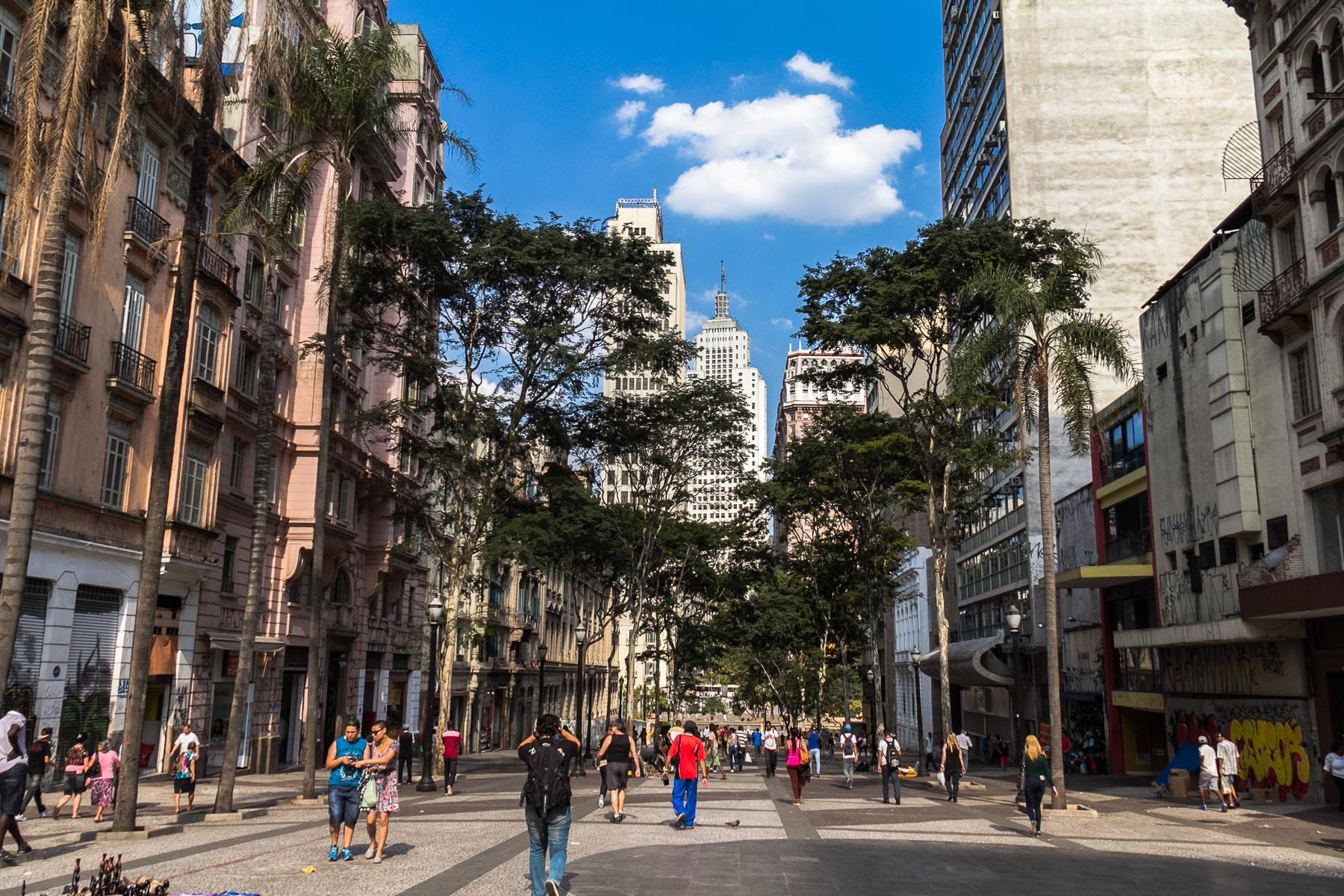
Largo do Paiçandu.

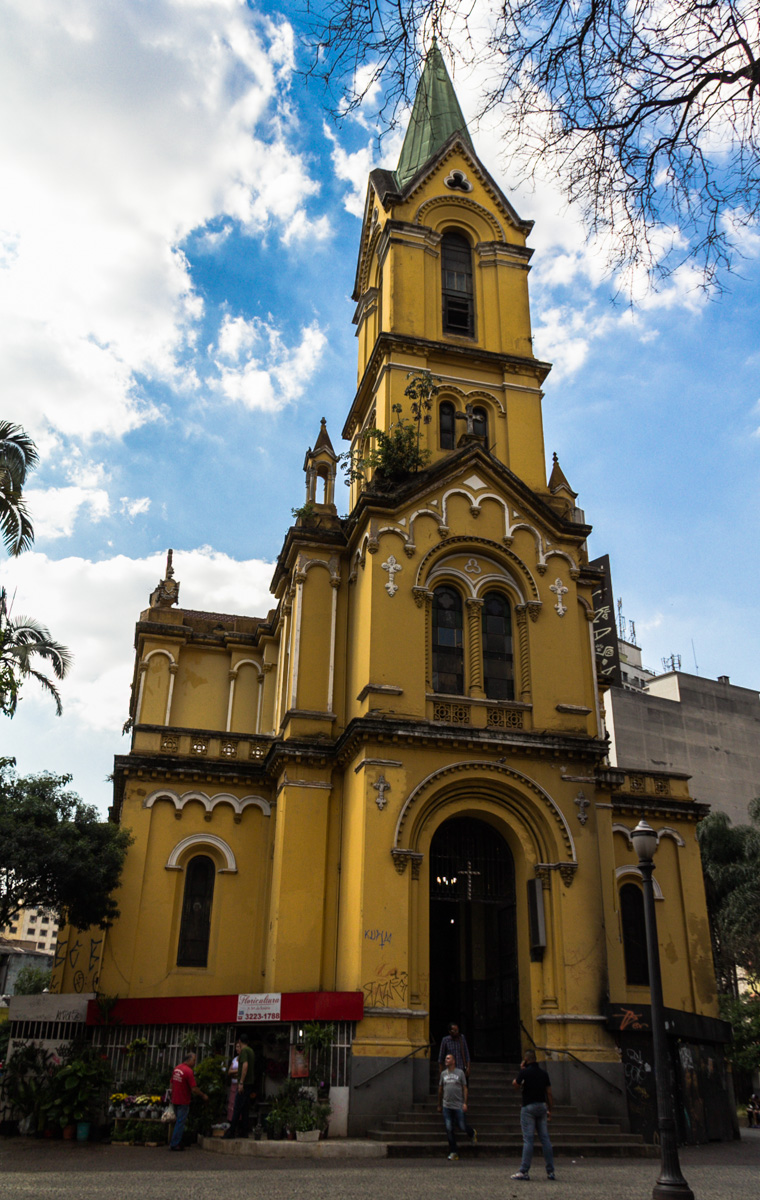
Largo do Paiçandu.

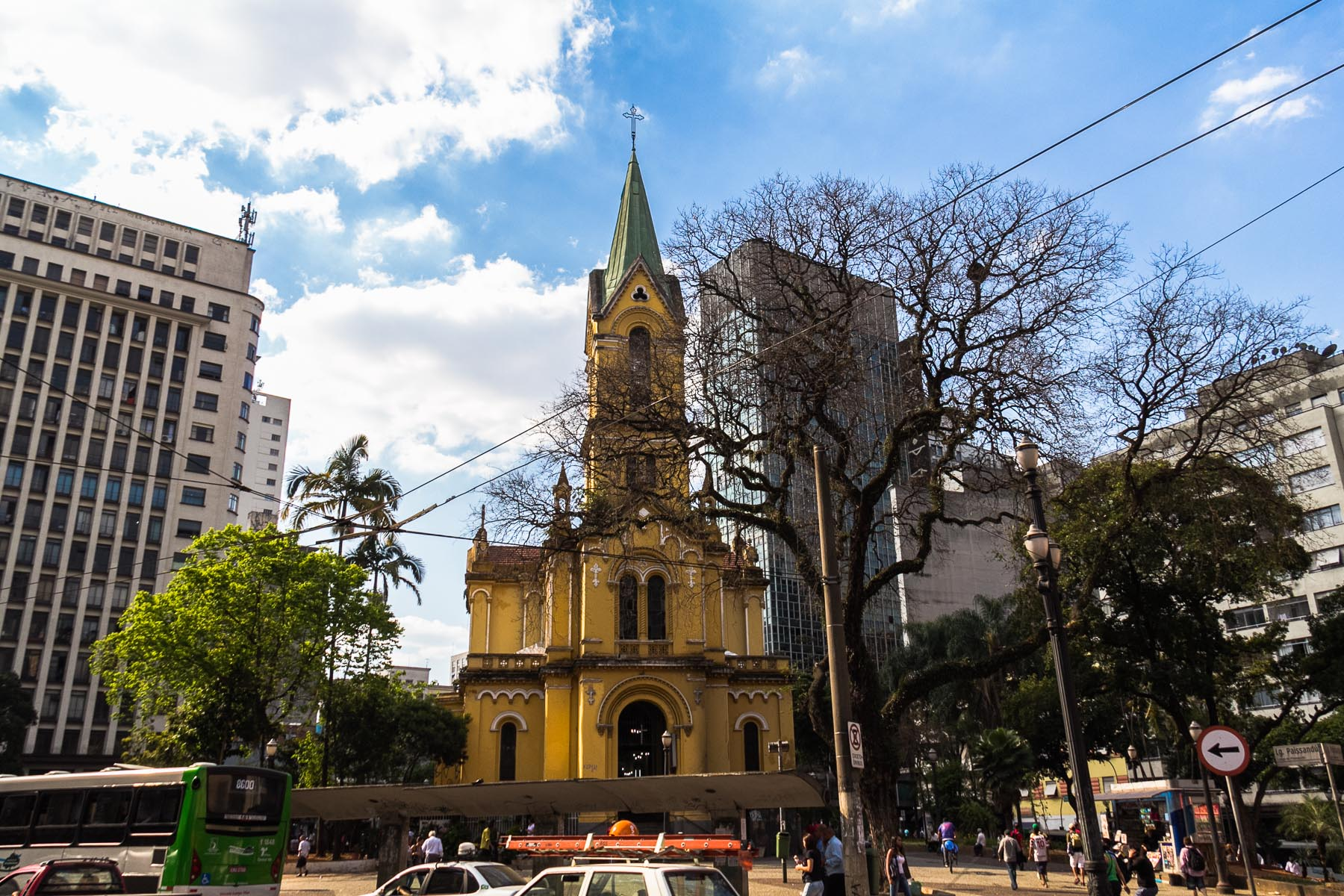
Largo do Paiçandu.

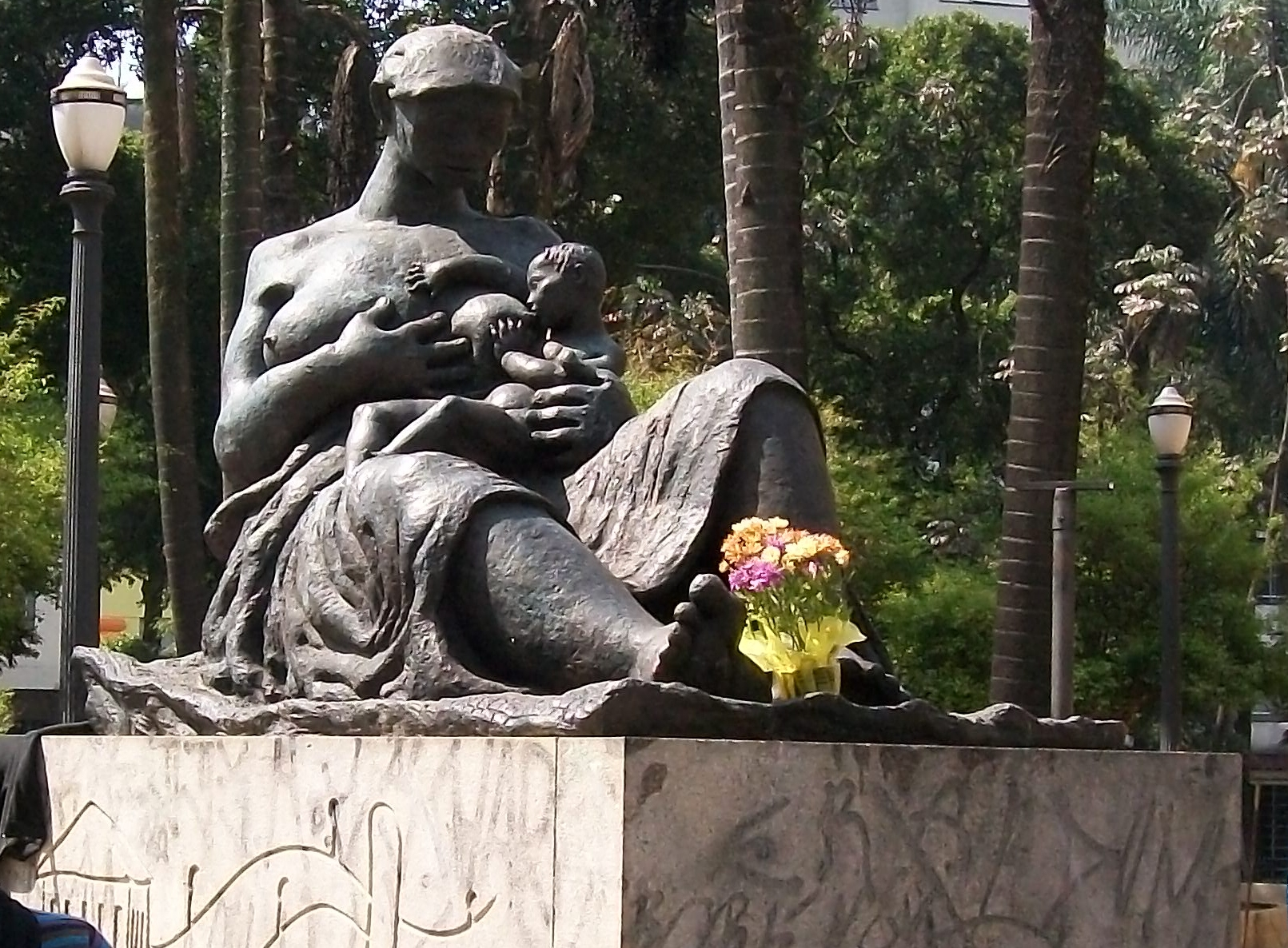
Monument to the Black Mother, behind the Church of the Rosary.

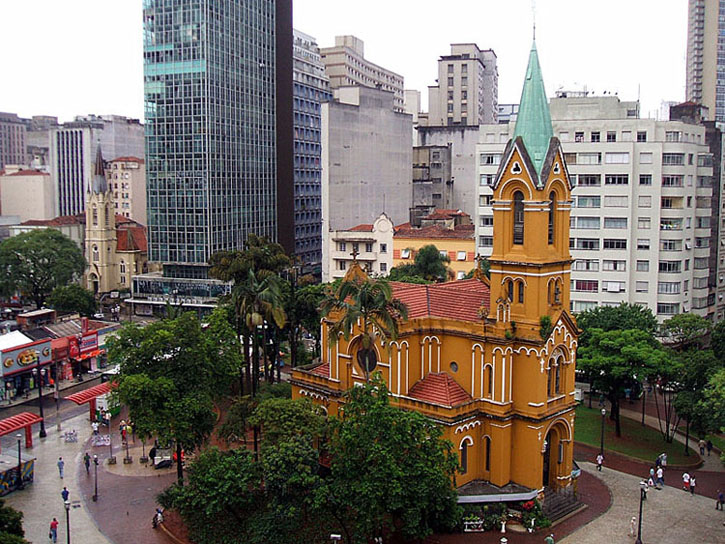
Church of Our Lady of the Rosary of Black Men.

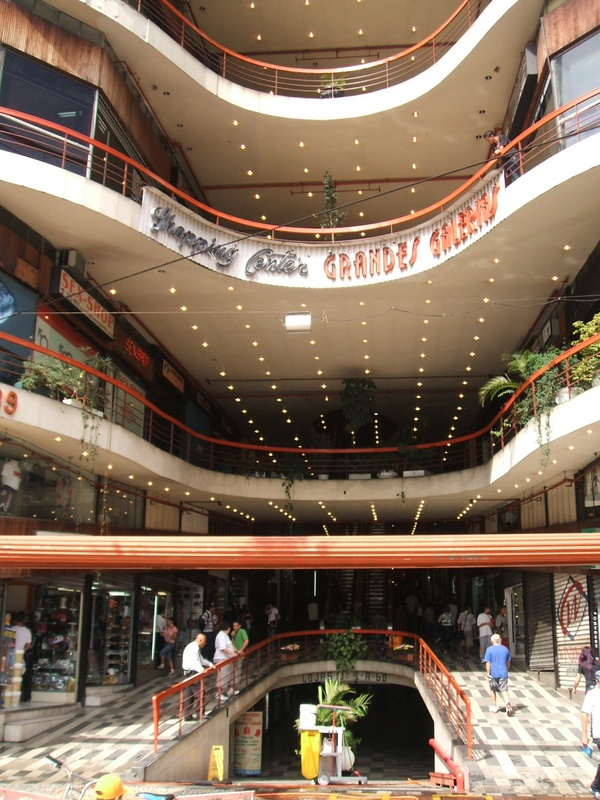
Galeria do Rock.

== See also ==
- Historic Center of São Paulo
- Tourism in the city of São Paulo
