= Monument to the Bandeiras =

Sculpture in São Paulo, Brazil

Coordinates: 23.5800°S 46.6607°W

The Monument to the Flags
- O Monumento às Bandeiras (Portuguese)
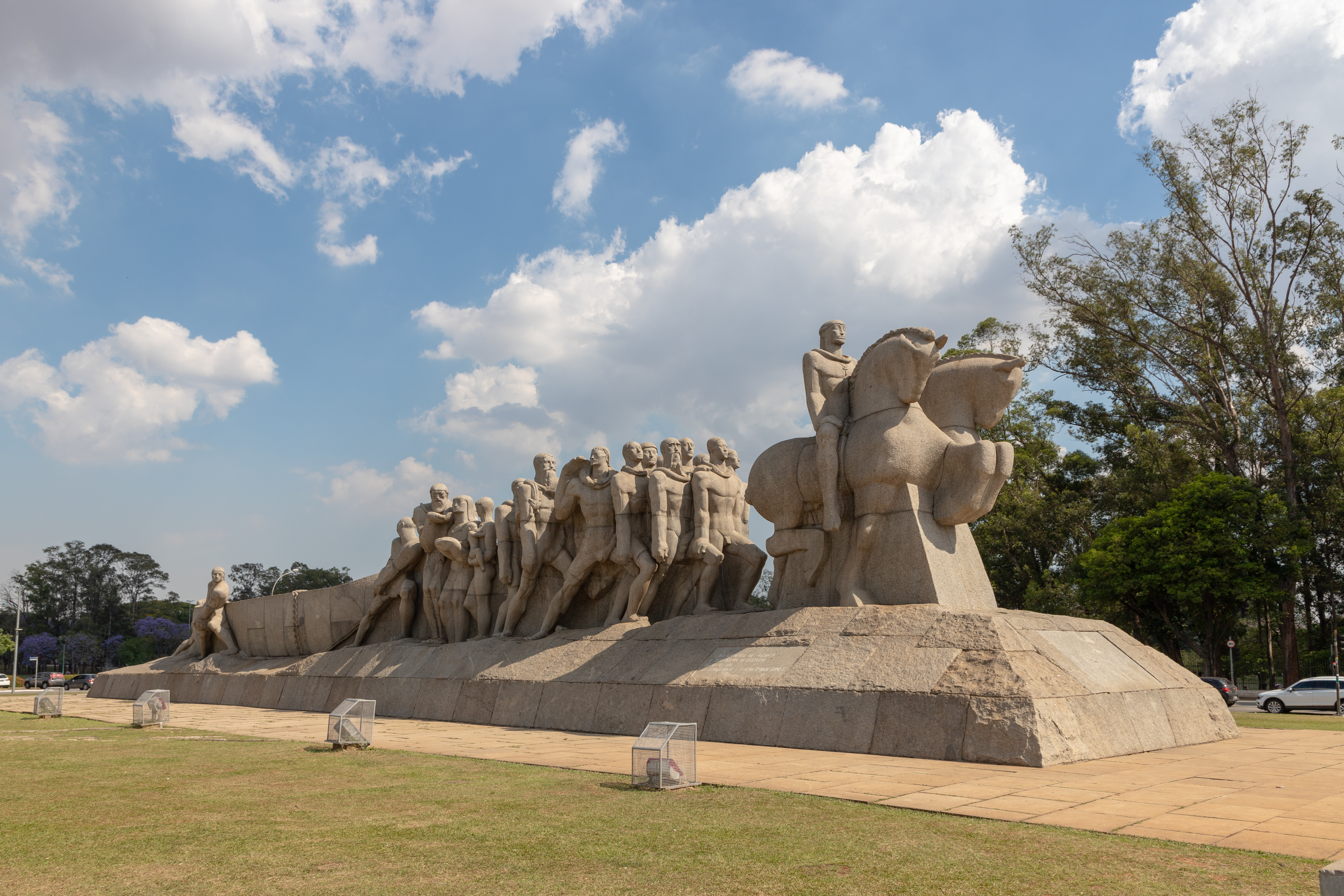
- Monument to the Bandeiras, front view
- Artist: Victor Brecheret
- Year: 1921
- Completion date: 1954
- Medium: Granite

Monument to the Bandeiras is a large-scale granite sculpture by the Italian-Brazilian sculptor Victor Brecheret (1894-1955) at the entrance of Ibirapuera Park in São Paulo, Brazil. It was commissioned by the government of São Paulo in 1921 and completed in 1954. It commemorates the 17th-century bandeiras, or settling expeditions into the interior of Brazil, and the bandeirantes that participated in them. The monument is huge and in a prominent location, making it an easily identifiable part of the landscape of São Paulo.

The monument was erected in the south-central area of the city in the Praça Armando de Salles Oliveira (Armando de Salles Oliveira Square), opposite the Palácio 9 de Julho, headquarters of the Legislative Assembly of São Paulo.

== Controversy ==
The monument has been the subject of criticism for neglecting the darker side of the bandeirantes, who killed and enslaved members of the indigenous peoples of Brazil. The monument regularly attracts vandalism, such as red paint symbolizing blood. Others have noted the high cost of a day to maintain and clean the monument of graffiti. In the wake of the global protests which erupted after the murder of George Floyd, the monument has come under renewed criticism for its celebration of slavers and demands for its removal.

== Gallery ==
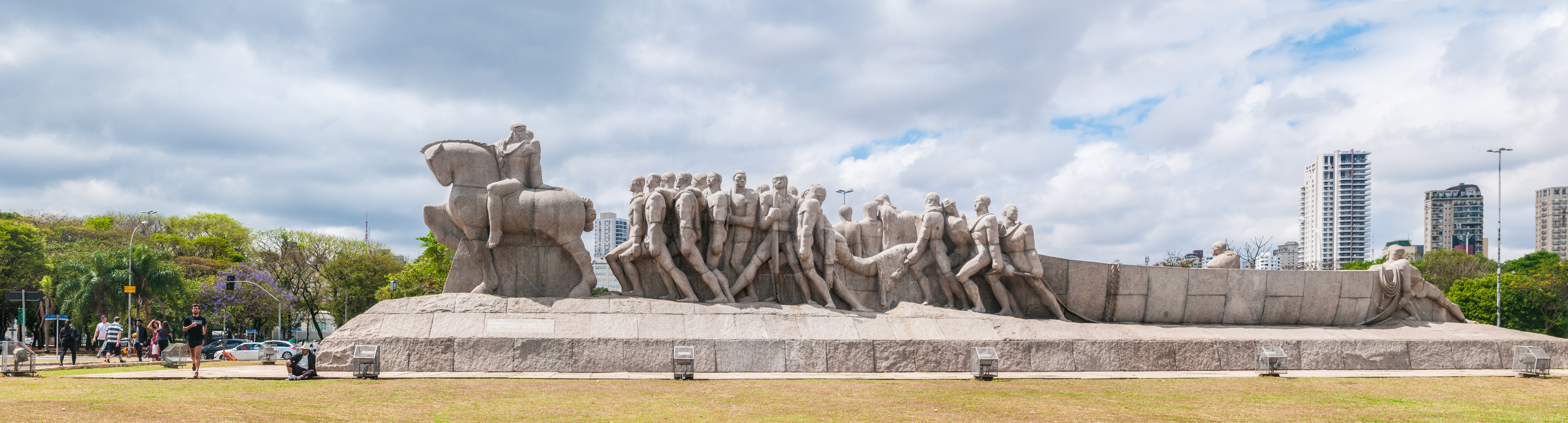
Monumento às Bandeiras
