= Igreja Nossa Senhora da Consolação (São Paulo) =

Catholic Temple in São Paulo, Brazil

Church of Our Lady of Consolation
- Paróquia Nossa Senhora da Consolação e São João Batista (Parish Church of Our Lady of Consolation and St. John the Baptist)
- Igreja da Consolação (Church of Consolation)
- Igreja Nossa Senhora da Consolação
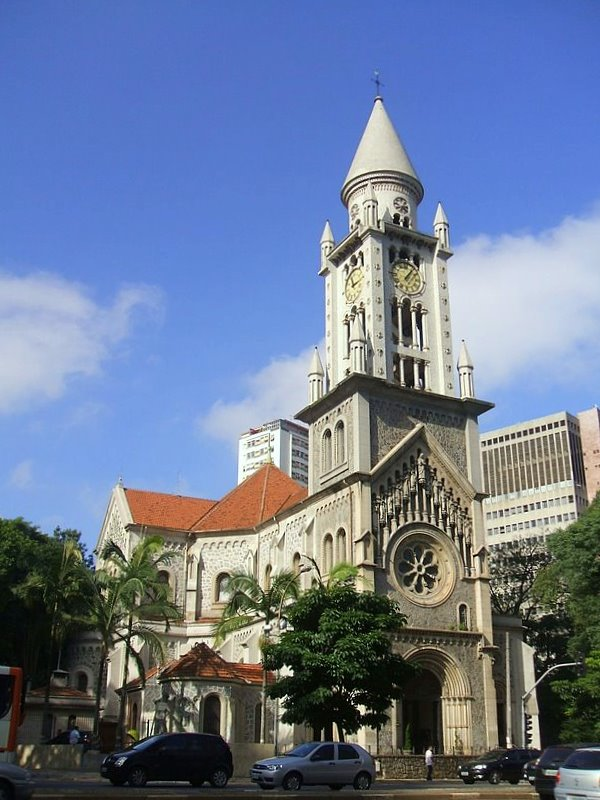
- Front and side views of the church
- Church of Our Lady of Consolation
- 23°32′51″S 46°38′50″W
- Location: São Paulo, São Paulo; Brazil
- Denomination: Roman Catholic

History
- Founded: 1799

Architecture
- Architect: Maximilian Emil Hehl
- Style: Romanesque Revival
- Completed: 1959

Administration
- Archdiocese: Archdiocese of São Paulo

Igreja Nossa Senhora da Consolação (English: Church of Our Lady of Consolation) is located in the Consolação neighborhood in the Brazilian city of São Paulo. It was founded in 1799 and reformed in 1840. The current building was designed by the German engineer Maximilian Emil Hehl and built between 1909 and 1959 at the location of the original temple.

== History ==
The old temple of the Church of Our Lady of Consolation was built in rammed earth in 1799 on Caminho dos Pinheiros (current Consolação Street) using donations from devotees of Our Lady of Consolation and with the support of the diocesan bishop, Dom Mateus de Abreu Pereira. The oldest record of its construction is a document written by Jacinto Ribeiro, who attributes the idea of the church to the faithful Luiz da Silva and his brothers. On November 23, 1803, an official letter was posted expressing the need for drinking water for the residents of the Nossa Senhora da Consolação neighborhood. The tradition of baptizing districts with religious names suggests the existence and importance of the temple in the area. In 1810, a floor plan of the city of São Paulo included the chapel.

Initially, the Church of Our Lady of Consolation belonged to the Church of Saint Iphigenia. In 1840, the temple was renovated for the first time. It acquired five windows, two towers, the main door, two side doors, two side entrances, wide access stairs and a new facade in the colonial style. At that time, the carved wooden image of Our Lady of Consolation was transferred to the Pátio do Colégio. The image is currently in the Museum of Sacred Art of São Paulo.

In 1855, the Brotherhood of Our Lady of Consolation was founded. During the cholera epidemic in the 19th century, the association sheltered the victims in 30 improvised beds in the church courtyard. Due to the brotherhood's dedication to the treatment of the sick, the church became a parish and began coordinating smaller temples, such as the Holy Cross of Perdizes in Santa Cecília, the Divine Holy Spirit in Bela Vista, and Our Lady of Mount Serrat in Pinheiros.

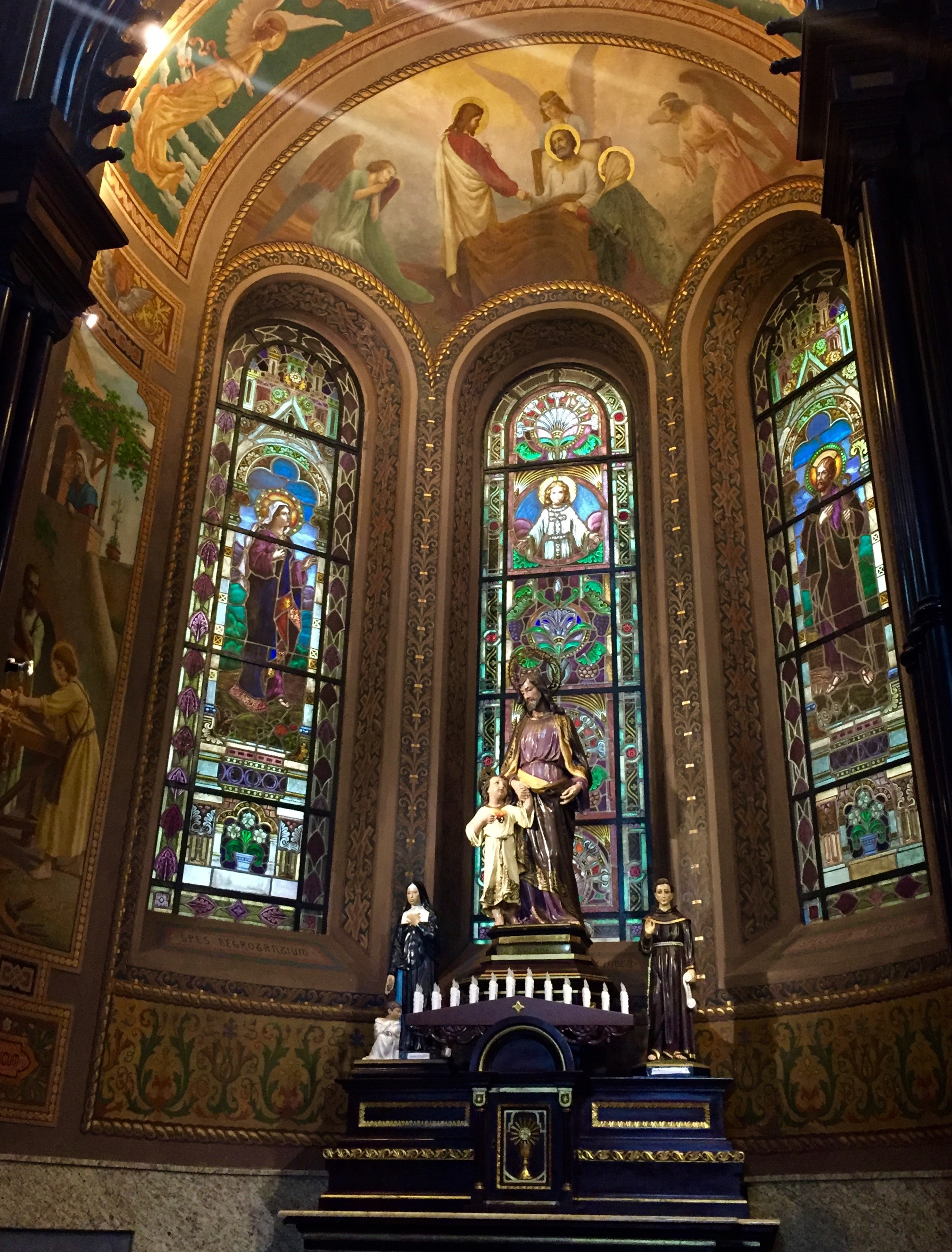
Altar to Saint Joseph decorated with stained glass windows based on passages from the Bible.

At the end of the 19th century, the city of São Paulo experienced urban expansion. In 1891, Paulista Avenue became consolidated and noble neighborhoods such as Higienópolis and Pacaembu were established. The area around the church, filled with buildings inspired by European design, rendered the rammed earth temple obsolete. In 1907, the structure was demolished to accommodate a new building. The surrounding plot of land belonged to Veridiana da Silva Prado and was bought for 40 contos de réis.

In 1909, the new project was created by the German engineer Maximilian Emil Hehl. Due to a financial crisis in the state of São Paulo, the church only opened in 1959. In 1922, during construction, Monsignor Francisco Bastos assumed command of the church after several priests abandoned it. He dedicated himself to revitalizing the parish and raising money for its completion.

During the bombings of the 1924 Revolution, the church housed and fed over 500 people. Under the military dictatorship, at the suggestion of Dom Paulo Evaristo Arns, the temple hosted a large protest attended by thousands of people at the wake of Santo Dias, a worker murdered by the police during a picket. The population carried his coffin in a procession towards the Cathedral of São Paulo, shouting slogans against police violence.

== Architecture ==
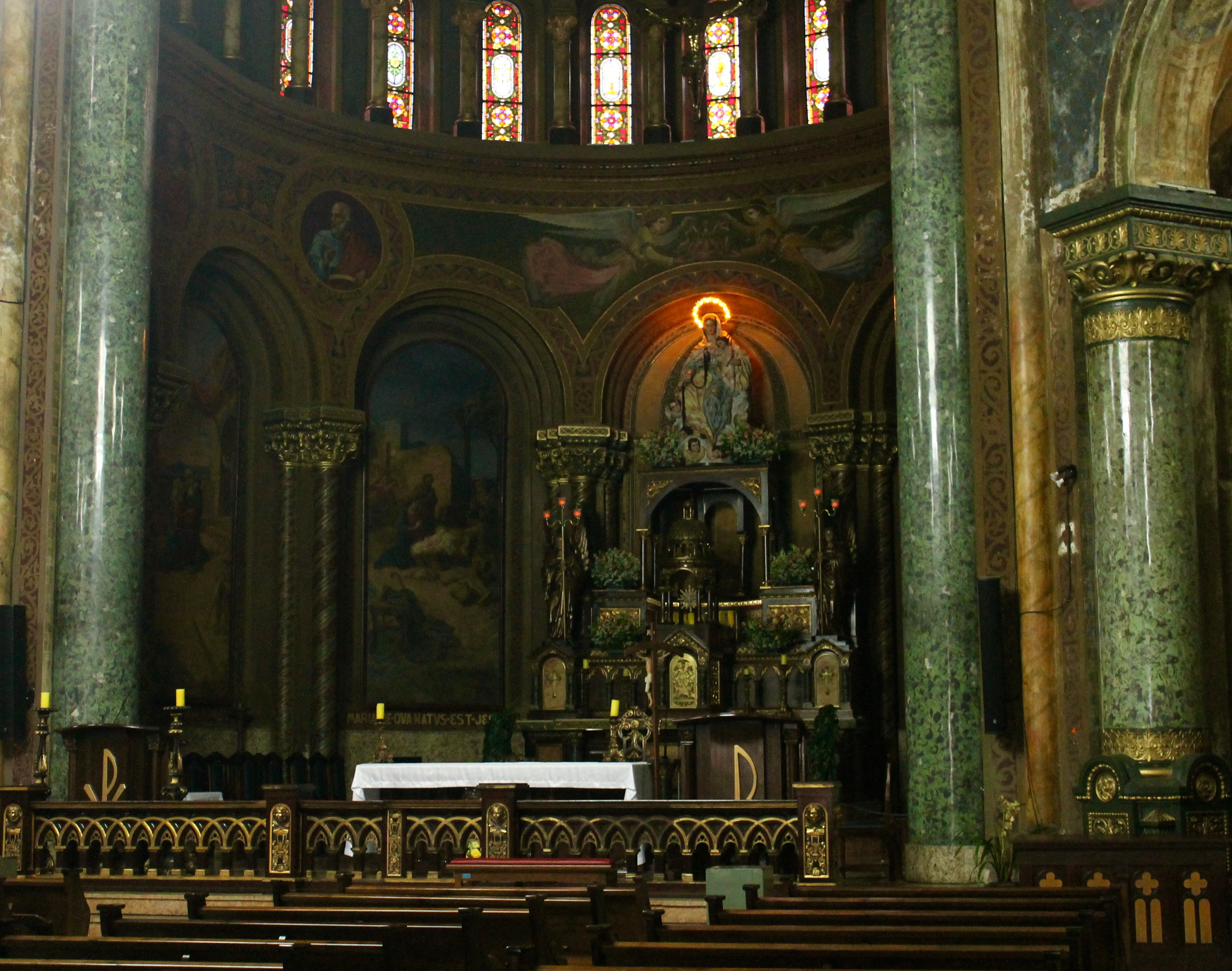
The main altar of the church, which used to feature a sculpture of Our Lady of Consolation.

Maximilian Emil Hehl, an engineer-architect trained at the Hanover Polytechnic School in Germany, also designed the Metropolitan Cathedral of São Paulo. The floor plan, shaped as a Latin cross, reaches 49.7 meters at the longest section and 33.1 meters at the shortest. There is only one tower, which houses the bells, renovated and blessed by Dom Odilo Pedro Scherer in December 2012. The first floor of the tower is used as an atrium. Located in the center of the transept, the dome reaches 20 meters in diameter and 20 meters in height. The facade is composed of Romanesque columns, capitals and arches, and the 75-meter-high tower is topped by a cone and pinnacle with a clock in the center. It includes a portal with archivolts and a rose window carved from beaten wrought iron made by Abreu & Cia.

Inside, there are paintings on the domes and walls signed by famous Brazilian artists such as Benedito Calixto and Oscar Pereira da Silva. The main altar, made of oak, white marble and bronze by the French company Maison Forest, features several canvases by Oscar Pereira da Silva and displays the image of Our Lady of Consolation. It has side chapels dedicated to the Sacred Heart of Jesus, with images of the life of Christ painted on the walls and sculptures of Saint Margaret Mary Alacoque, and to Our Lady Help of Christians. The floor of the church is covered in polychrome tiles, but it has been partially replaced with granite due to natural wear and tear.

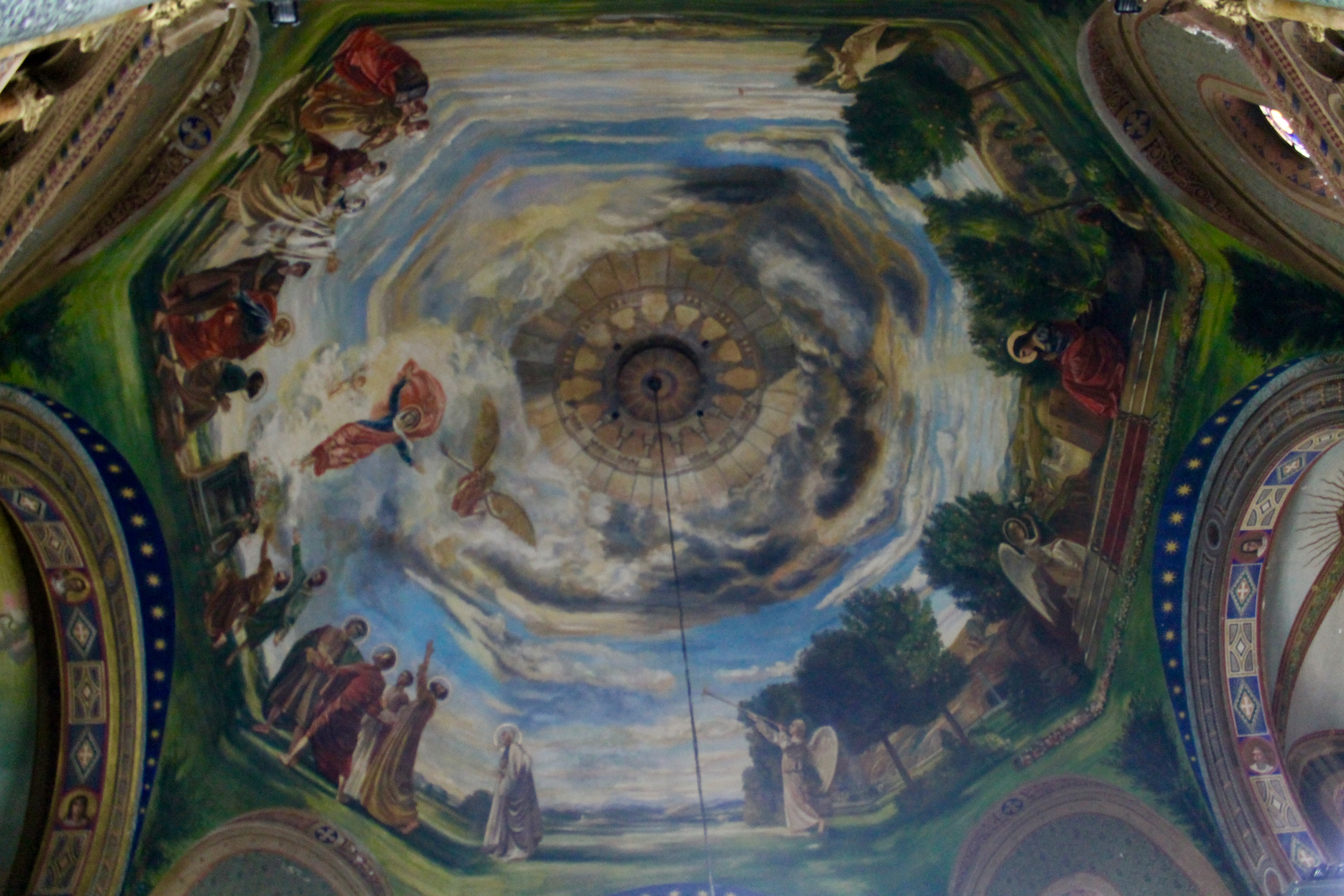
Painting on the central ceiling of the church.

Since the 19th century, the church has displayed images of Saint John the Baptist, Saint Anne, Saint Peter, Saint Michael, Saint Joseph, Our Lady of the Conception, Saint Paul and Saint Francis of Paola. There are also plaques paying homage to the wealthy who contributed to the establishment of the temple, such as the Baron of Ramalho and the Baron of Tietê. The venue also features a pipe organ brought from Naples, Italy, in 1931. The stained glass windows are from the former Casa Conrado. The nave's central chandelier, made of beaten iron, was created by the São Paulo School of Arts and Crafts. The pulpit is carved in wood.

In 2011, a complete renovation of the interior was announced, which included repairs to the paintings, decorative details and the organ.

== See also ==
- Tourism in the city of São Paulo
