= Incident on September 4, 2015, at São Paulo Cathedral =

2015 hostage crisis in São Paulo, Brazil

On September 4, 2015, at São Paulo Cathedral in São Paulo, Brazil, an armed man, Luiz Antonio da Silva, took a woman hostage inside the cathedral. The police intervened quickly, and after a tense standoff, they managed to shoot the assailant, who was killed by the officers' gunfire. During the incident, Francisco Erasmo Rodrigues de Lima intervened in an attempt to help the hostage and was shot and killed by the assailant.

== Reactions ==
The incident prompted immediate reactions both locally and nationally. The local community expressed solidarity with the hostage and her family, and mourned the loss of Francisco Erasmo Rodrigues de Lima. Authorities vowed to improve security measures in public spaces. The event was widely reported in the media, with numerous discussions on issues of security and crime prevention.
