= Eliane de Grammont =

- Born: 10 August 1955; São Paulo, Brazil
- Died: 30 March 1981 (aged 25) São Paulo, Brazil
- Genres: Romantic music
- Occupations: Singer, composer
- Years active: 1975–1981

Eliane Aparecida de Grammont (10 August 1955 – 30 March 1981) was a Brazilian singer and composer. She was murdered in 1981 by her ex-husband Lindomar Castilho, which became one of the most well-known cases of femicide in Brazil and which also became a flash point in the campaign to combat violence against women in the country.

== Biography ==
Grammont was born on 10 August 1955 in São Paulo, the daughter of composer Elena de Grammont. Most of her siblings began careers in journalism and in radio, such as her sister Helena, who became a journalist at Rede Globo. Their father died of cardiomyopathy, a disease that would also kill two of her siblings.

In 1977, Eliane met, while at record label RCA, the bolero singer Lindomar Castilho, who at that point became considerably popular, with his music having sold more than 800,000 records at the time. After two years of dating, they married in 1979.

Her family was against the marriage, but she went against her relatives in order to marry Castilho; she also insisted that at the wedding, their material wealth be separated, so as to signal to people that their marriage was not based on his success or money. Castilho forced her to end her singing career after they got married.

During their brief marriage, they had a daughter. Castilho was abusive towards Grammont, including instances of violent assaults. After episodes of separation and reconciliation, they separated after 1 year of marriage in 1980, against Castilho's wishes.

Six months after their marriage ended, she attempted to reconciliate with Castilho, but he demanded that she sign a document containing 10 promises, among them for her to leave her job that she worked at for years, which incensed Castilho.

Grammont later discovered that she also had the same condition that killed many in her family, and as a result attempted to restart her career as a singer; It was then that she was invited by Carlos Randall, a guitarist and Castilho's cousin, to present at the Belle Époque Café. They later would begin to develop a romance between themselves. Castilho had taken Randall to São Paulo in 1974 and later came to suspect that he and Grammont had a romantic relationship, suspicions which grew after he separated from Grammont.

== Murder ==
Grammont, who put a pause on her career with the birth of her child, had been separated for nearly a year from Castilho when she was performing at a bar in São Paulo. While singing "João e Maria" by Chico Buarque, she was shot at multiple times. Carlos Randall was also shot at and was hit in the abdomen. Castilho attempted to flee, but was detained and beaten by onlookers, who held him down until the police arrived. Grammont was mortally wounded; she was taken to the emergency room, but was declared dead upon her arrival.

During the trial, Castilho's defense sought to accuse Grammont of having been a mother who did not take care of her obligations, along with having cheated on Castilho and of reprehensible behavior. Throughout the trial, women protested in front of the court for the right to live; The few men that were there were there to provoke the women, arguing for the "right" to kill in cases of men "defending one's honor". Through euphemisms used at the time, Castilho's lawyer, Waldir Troncoso Perez, argued that he had been taken over by "violent emotion"; at that time, such crimes were excused by claims of passion, loss of peace or "legitimate defense of honor". Marcio Thomaz Bastos, the then president of the Order of Attorneys of Brazil (OAS), was part of the prosecution. 5 out of 7 jurors opted to sentence him to 12 years and two months in prison. He was released in 1996, and died in 2025.

=== Cultural and historical context ===
While still free, Castilho responded to the jury in 1984 while women protested in front of the court; on the second day of the judgment, many men were transported to there (according to reports, having been hired to do so) and went on to throw eggs at the protestors. They proceeded to shout at and harass them, shouting phrases such as "mulher que bota chifre tem que virar sanduíche". Even while sentenced, the singer was still released temporarily.

Violence against women was widely normalized in Brazil, with songs from artists such as Sidney Magal having lyrics that romanticized femicide. At the time, adultery was considered a crime under the Brazilian Penal Code, and Congress at the time was passing a proposed law that would remove the act from the penal code.

=== Cultural impact and defense of women ===
The crime had widespread repercussions in Brazil, not only for involving very well known names in popular music at that time, but also for the scale in which the media played an important role in changing the social views of what was described then as "crimes of passion", receiving wide coverage.

After a mass was held in tribute to her at Igreja da Consolação on 4 April 1981, more than a thousand women wearing black marched in protest against violence by femicidal men, with slogans including "those who love don't kill", and marched to Cemitério do Araçá. Various institutions dedicated to women's rights came about as a result of the protests; one of these was "Grupo masculino de apoio à luta das mulheres", having as members various intellectuals and which launched a "manifesto against barbarity."

The humorist Henfil, who presented a program called "TV Homem" on the daily television program TV Mulher, published a section on the weekly newspaper ISTOÉ where he wrote letters to his mother and commented on the weekly news; on the edition published 8 April 1981, on commenting on the fact that the police had apprehended a man who assaulted a woman and made him walk on the streets in order to humiliate him, he wrote ironically "Why is it to make a man dress like a woman is to humiliate, to demoralize? Why is it that being a woman is the most humiliating and demoralizing thing that there is? Worse than being a dog, a duck, or a chicken? Anyhow. It’s because of this that one (two, three, a thousand) Lindomar Castilho has the legitimate right to kill Eliane de Grammont. Ah, he is just merciful. He wanted to free Eliane of the humiliation, the demoralization of being…a woman."

In November 1982, responding to his being freed from prison, Castilho was prevented by dozens of women from performing a show in Goiânia, with them distributing a pamphlet with a photo of Grammont and her daughter Liliane, along with the following: "Eliane Gramont^{(sic)} will not sing today. She is dead."

In 2019, the crime was listed by the website Último Segundo (by IG) as one of the "famous crimes that shocked" Brazil.

== Tributes ==
In São Paulo, in the Barra Funda neighborhood, one of the roads in the neighborhood was renamed "Eliane Aparecida de Grammont" in December 1981.

"Eliane de Grammont" is also the name of a street in Londrina, in the state of Paraná.

In São Paulo, there is the Casa Eliane de Grammont, a state institution that is meant to give psychosocial and legal support to women affected by gender violence, maintained by the municipal government of São Paulo.

== Bibliography ==
- Os Crimes da Paixão, Mariza Corrêa, ed. Brasiliense, col. "É Tudo História", 85 pages.
