= Eduardo Prado =

Brazilian writer (1860–1901)

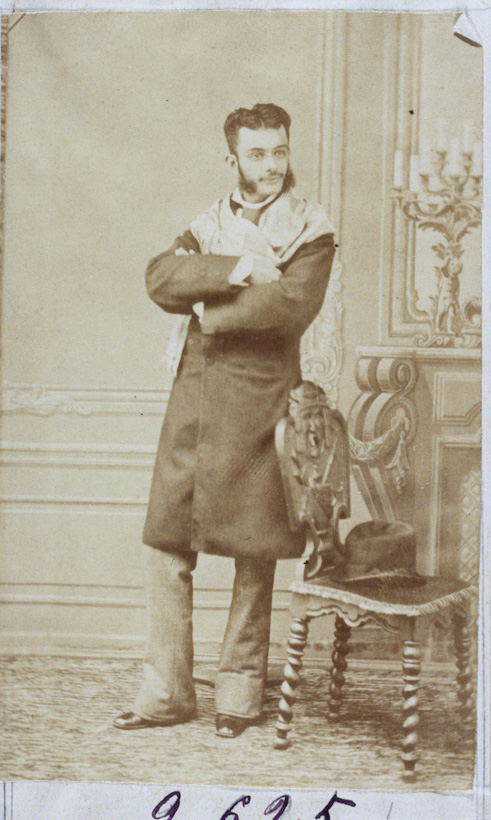
- Born: February 27, 1860; São Paulo, São Paulo, Brazil
- Died: August 30, 1901 (aged 41); São Paulo, São Paulo, Brazil
- Cause of death: Yellow fever
- Education: Faculty of Law of São Paulo
- Occupations: Writer, activist, politician, journalist
- Notable work: A Ilusão Americana (1893)
- Political party: Monarchist Party of São Paulo

Eduardo Paulo da Silva Prado (February 27, 1860 – August 30, 1901) was a Brazilian writer, journalist, and lawyer. He was one of the founding members of the Brazilian Academy of Letters.

== Biography ==
Born in São Paulo into a wealthy family of coffee landowners, he was the son of the politician Martinho Prado (pt) and the noblewoman Veridiana Prado. He took an interest in the study of history from a young age. By the time he graduated from the Faculty of Law of São Paulo, he was already contributing to the newspaper Correio Paulistano with articles on literary criticism and international politics.

In the 1880s, he travelled throughout Europe, visited Egypt, and worked as an attaché at a Brazilian delegation in London. His observations and stories from those travels were collected in his first book, Viagens.

Following the military coup d'état that deposed the Emperor Pedro II, Prado, then a journalist in Portugal, began writing severe critiques of the republican government in his crônicas, some of which were compiled in the book Fastos da Ditadura Militar no Brasil.

In 1893, he published the book A ilusão americana, a critical analysis of republicanism and an attack on the United States, particularly on its political institutions and growing influence over Latin America. The book was summarily confiscated and censored by the Brazilian government. Prado published his last book, III Centenário de Anchieta, a biography of the Jesuit priest José de Anchieta, shortly before dying from yellow fever.

Prado is believed to have inspired Eça de Queiroz's character Jacinto, the eccentric protagonist of the novel A Cidade e as Serras. He was a member of the Brazilian Historic and Geographic Institute.

== Works ==
- Viagens, 1886 - 1902
- Os fastos da ditadura militar no Brasil (1890)
- Anulação das liberdades públicas (1892)
- A ilusão americana (1893)
- III centenário de Anchieta (1900)
- Coletâneas, 1904-1906
