= Maximilian Emil Hehl =

German engineer and architect

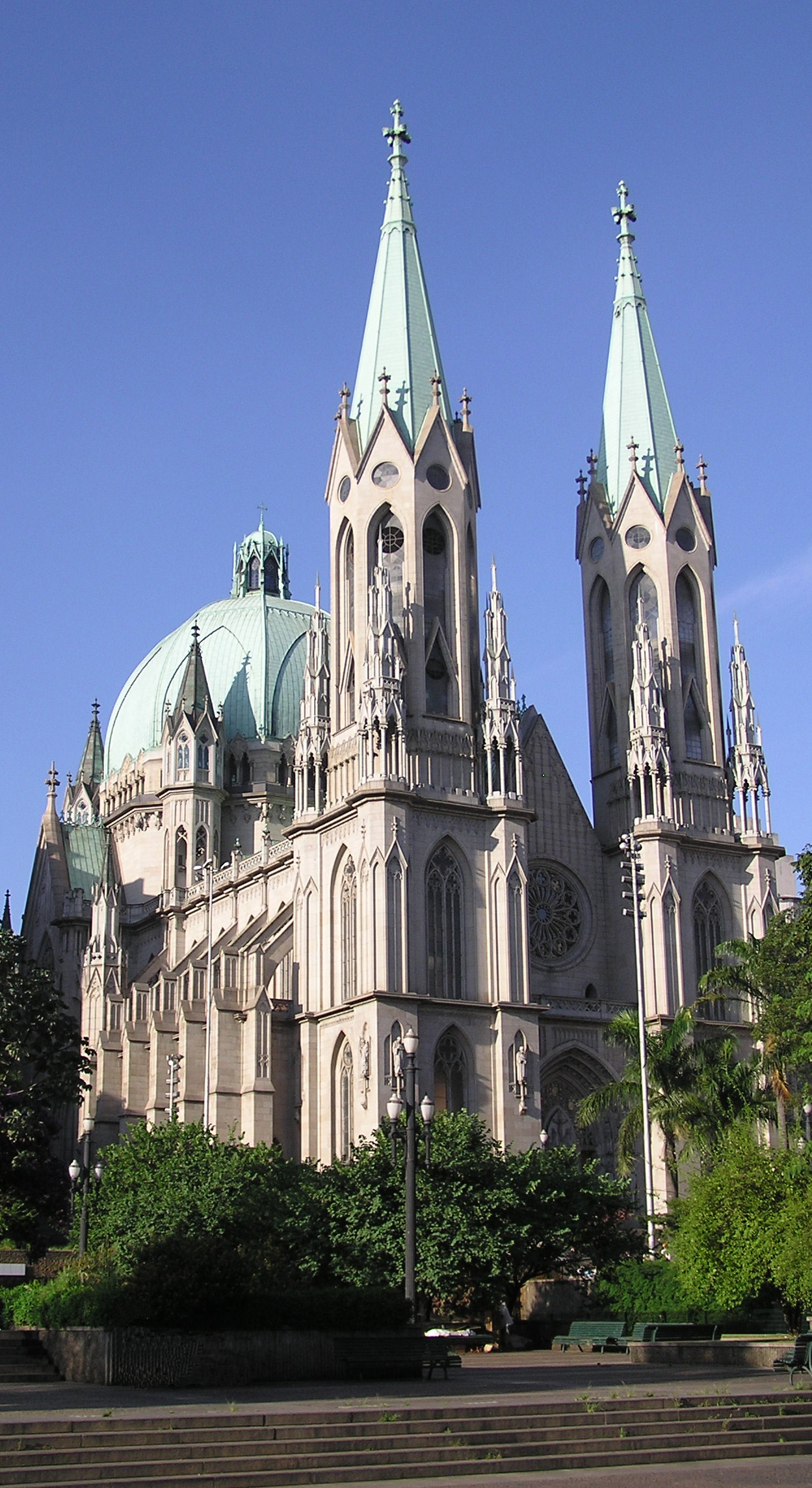
São Paulo Cathedral, projected by Hehl

Maximilian Emil Hehl (Kassel, September 17, 1861 – São Paulo, August 27, 1916) was a German engineer and architect active in Brazil.

Hehl was the son of Johannes Hehl, director of the Kassel Polytechnic College, and Carolin Wolff Hehl. He studied engineering at the University of Hanover, and in 1888, he migrated to Brazil to work on railway construction in Minas Gerais. He later moved to São Paulo he became professor at the University of São Paulo Polytechnic School in 1898.

His major work is the São Paulo Cathedral, which was executed in neo-Gothic style; he died before its completion. He also designed Santos Cathedral and the Consolação Church (São Paulo).
