= Our Lady of the Rosary Cathedral, Santos =

Our Lady of the Rosary Cathedral
- Catedral Nossa Senhora do Rosário
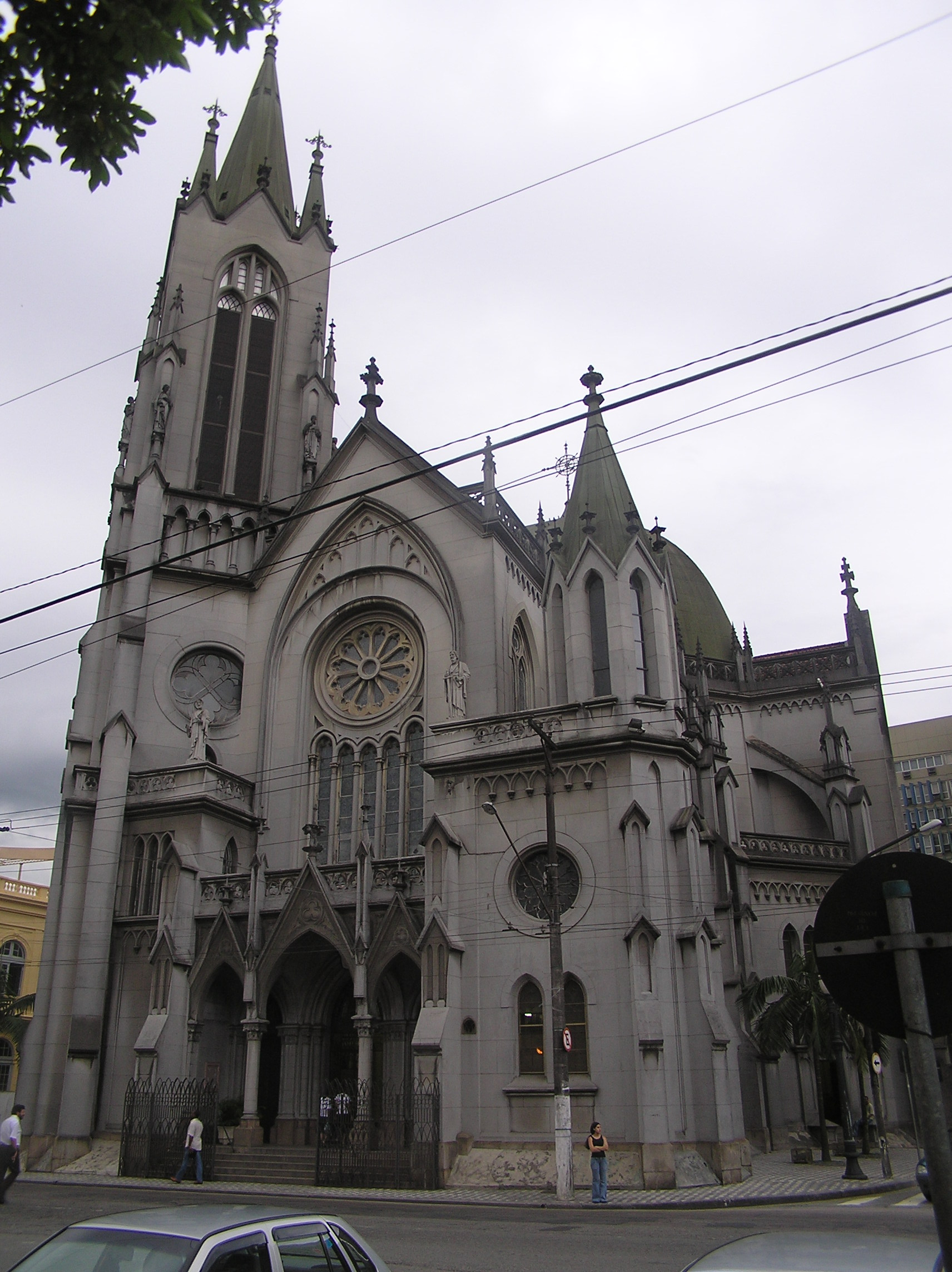
- Our Lady of the Rosary Cathedral
- 23°56′13″S 46°19′28″W
- Location: Santos
- Country: Brazil
- Denomination: Roman Catholic Church

The Our Lady of the Rosary Cathedral (Portuguese: Catedral Nossa Senhora do Rosário), also known as Santos Cathedral. Is a Catholic church in the city of Santos, in São Paulo State, Brazil. It is the headquarters of the Diocese of Santos and the Parish of Our Lady of Rosario Aparecida, the oldest in the city.

The old church of Santos, predecessor of the present cathedral was demolished in 1907 by being in an advanced state of deterioration. In 1909, the construction of the new church - the current temple - began, according to the design of the German engineer Maximilian Emil Hehl, professor of the Polytechnic School of São Paulo. Hehl designed a neo-Gothic style church at that time, with a dome over the Renaissance style cruiser. In general, the project is similar to the Metropolitan Cathedral of São Paulo, designed by Hehl himself.

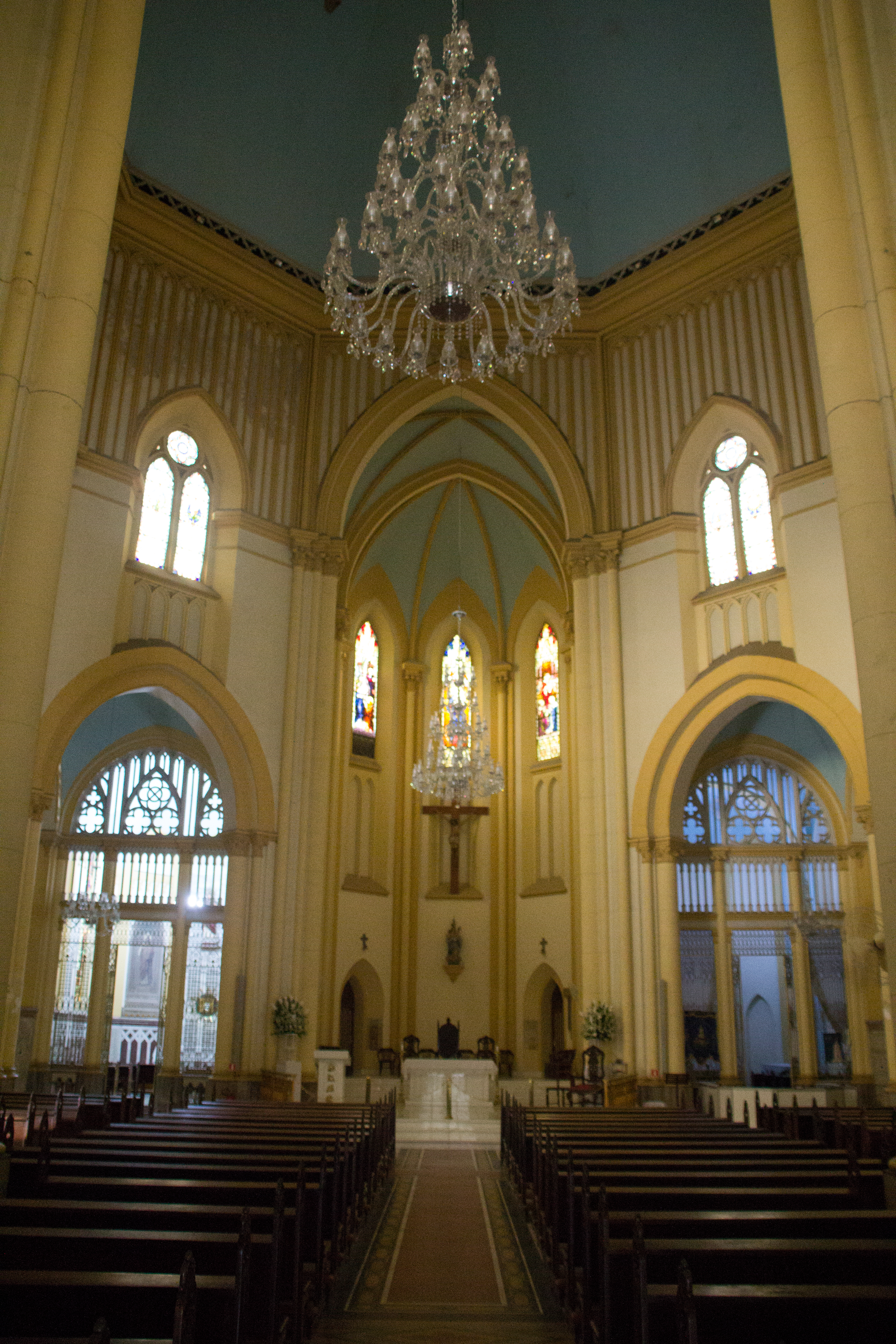
Inside the cathedral

The church, still unfinished, was temporarily opened in 1924, with a Mass celebrated by the metropolitan archbishop Duarte Leopoldo e Silva. In 1925 the Diocese of Saints was created by Pope Pius XI, and the temple was elevated to the category of cathedral. The works of the church would not be finished until 1967.

== See also ==
- Roman Catholicism in Brazil
- Our Lady of the Rosary
