= Lindomar Castilho =

Brazilian musician and murderer (1940–2025)

Lindomar Cabral (January 21, 1940 – December 20, 2025), better known by his stage name Lindomar Castilho, was a Brazilian singer, songwriter and convicted murderer.

== Early life and career ==
Castilho was born in Rio Verde on January 21, 1940. He recorded his first album in 1962, titled Canções Que Não Se Esquecem Throughout his career, he recorded over 23 studio albums.

== Murder of ex wife ==
Lindomar married Eliane de Grammont on March 10, 1979, two years after meeting in the corridors of the old RCA record label, in São Paulo. The singer, at the time, was already known as the King of Bolero, while she was still rehearsing the first steps of her career. Before getting married, the two decided that she would no longer sing to dedicate herself to being a housewife and to take care of their daughter Liliane de Grammont.

Due to the aggressions and jealousy fueled by Lindomar's alcoholism, she, at the age of 25, asked for a separation, which Lindomar did not accept willingly. After separating, Eliane tried to resume her artistic career and began to perform with Carlos Randall, Lindomar's cousin. He began to suspect that the two had a romantic relationship, a situation that only worsened when Randall also separated from his wife.

Three months after being separated, on March 30, 1981, when she was singing at the Café Belle Époque, in the Bela Vista neighborhood, in São Paulo, Eliane was shot five times in the back, one of which also injured Randall, who was performing with her. Eliane died, and Randall subsequently took years to recover from the injury.

Lindomar tried to flee the scene, but was restrained by passersby. He was arrested and sentenced to 12 years and two months in prison by a popular jury on August 23, 1984. After serving his sentence, Castilho was released in 1996. While still an inmate of the Goiás penitentiary, he recorded the album Muralhas da Solidão.

== Death ==
Castilho died on December 20, 2025 at the age of 85.
