= Veridiana da Silva Prado =

Veridiana Valéria da Silva Prado
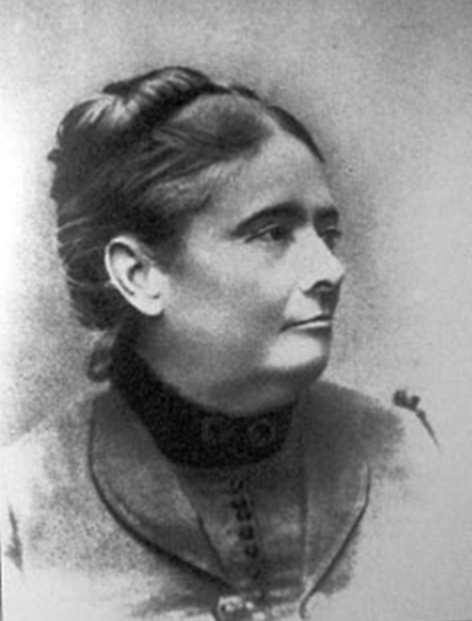
- Born: February 11, 1825; São Paulo, São Paulo
- Died: June 11, 1910 (aged 85); São Paulo, São Paulo
- Occupations: landowner, aristocrat, intellectual

Veridiana Valéria da Silva Prado (February 11, 1825 – June 11, 1910), known as Dona Veridiana, was a Brazilian aristocrat, landowner and intellectual. She had a significant influence in social, political and cultural life of the city of São Paulo at the end of the Empire and the beginning of the First Republic.

She managed the properties of the Prado family, that since the 18th century traded slaves and sugar, and commanded in her Chácara Vila Maria one of the most important cultural salons in São Paulo in the second half of the 19th century, which later became known as Dona Veridiana's Palace. There, she received artists, scientists, intellectuals and members of the royalty such as Emperor Pedro II of Brazil and Princess Isabel.

== Life ==
She was the daughter of Antônio da Silva Prado, baron of Iguape, coffee grower, sugar and troops trader, one of the wealthiest paulistanos of the time, and Maria Cândida de Moura Vaz. Her parents faced social prejudice and a legal barrier when they got married, as their mother, Maria Cândida, was a divorced woman.

Veridiana married her half-uncle Martinho da Silva Prado, but later separated, the divorce being considered a scandal for society at the time. However, she obtained command of the family and had 6 children, 36 grandchildren and 96 great-grandchildren.

Veridiana raised her children, who played prominent roles in politics, business, and social and cultural life in the country, including Antônio da Silva Prado, her firstborn son, who was Minister of State, senator, deputy and the first mayor of São Paulo (1899 to 1911); and Eduardo Paulo da Silva Prado, founder of the Brazilian Academy of Letters.
