= São Paulo Cathedral =

Cathedral in Brazil

Metropolitan Cathedral of Our Lady Assumption and Saint Paul
- Catedral Metropolitana de Nossa Senhora da Assunção e São Paulo (Portuguese)
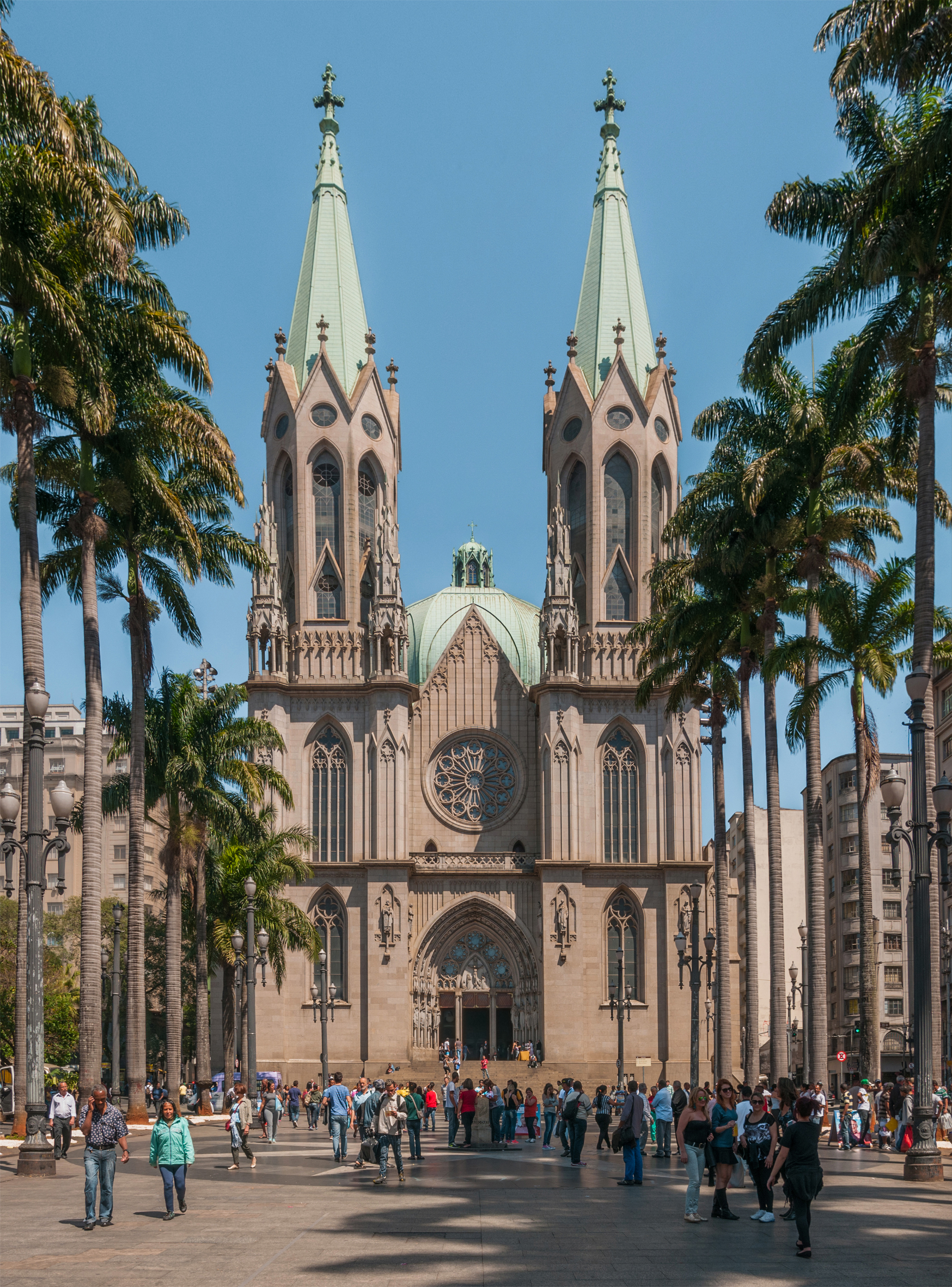

Religion
- Affiliation: Catholic Church
- Province: Archdiocese of São Paulo
- Year consecrated: 1954
- Status: Active

Location
- Location: São Paulo, Brazil
- Interactive map of Metropolitan Cathedral of Our Lady Assumption and Saint Paul
- Coordinates: 23°33′04″S 46°38′04″W

Architecture
- Architect: Maximilian Emil Hehl
- Style: Neo-Gothic
- Groundbreaking: 1913
- Completed: 1967

Specifications
- Length: 111 metres (364 ft)
- Width (nave): 46 metres (151 ft)
- Dome height (outer): 30 metres (98 ft)
- Spire height: 92 metres (302 ft)

The Metropolitan Cathedral of Our Lady Assumption and Saint Paul (Portuguese: Catedral Metropolitana de Nossa Senhora da Assunção e São Paulo), also known as the See Cathedral (Portuguese: Catedral da Sé), is the cathedral of the Roman Catholic Archdiocese of São Paulo, Brazil. Its current and seventh metropolitan archbishop is Dom Odilo Pedro Cardinal Scherer, appointed by Pope Benedict XVI on March 21, 2007, and installed on April 29 of the same year. The existing cathedral's construction, in a Gothic Revival style, began in 1913 and ended four decades later. It was ready for its dedication on the 400th anniversary of the foundation of the then humble villa of São Paulo by Chief or Cacique Tibiriçá and the Jesuit priests Manuel da Nóbrega and José de Anchieta. Despite its Renaissance-style dome, the São Paulo Metropolitan Cathedral is considered by some to be the fourth largest neo-Gothic cathedral in the world.

== History ==
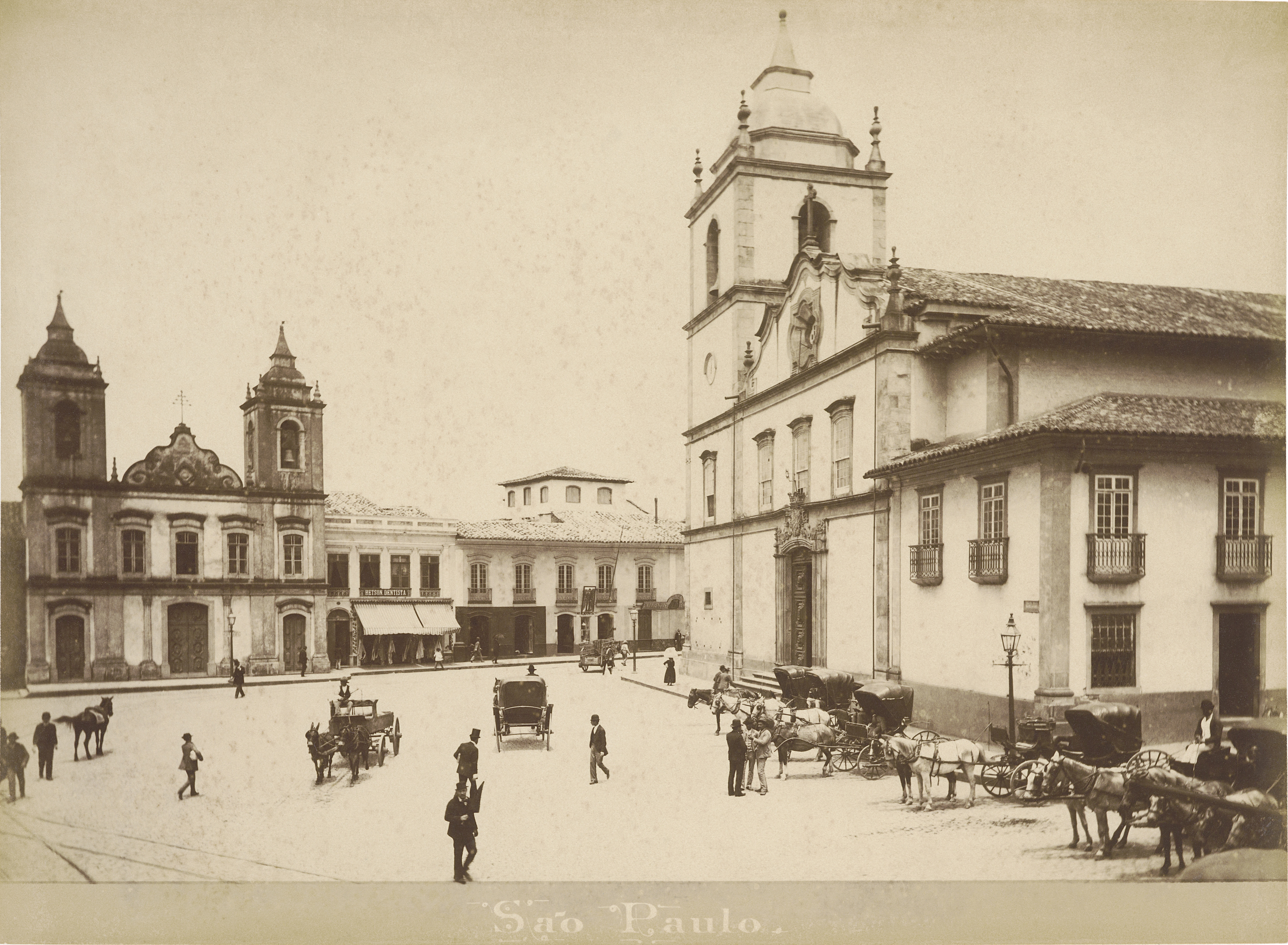
Cathedral square in a photo of 1880 by Marc Ferrez. The old Cathedral of São Paulo is the church to the right.

The history of the Cathedral of São Paulo goes back in time to 1589, when it was decided that a main church (the Matriz) would be built in the small village of São Paulo. This church, located on the site of the present cathedral, was only finished around 1616. São Paulo became seat of a diocese in 1745, and the old church was demolished and substituted by a new one, built in Baroque style, which was finished around 1764. This modest church would be the Cathedral of São Paulo until 1911, when it was demolished.

The present cathedral was built under Duarte Leopoldo e Silva, the first archbishop of São Paulo. Construction began in 1913 on the demolished colonial cathedral site following the project of German architect Maximilian Emil Hehl, who designed a Neo-Gothic structure. Work proceeded slowly, and the inauguration of the new Cathedral happened only in 1954, with the towers still unfinished, but in time for São Paulo's Fourth Centenary celebration. The towers would only be completed in 1967.

After a long period of decay, the cathedral underwent a complete renovation between 2000 and 2002. Apart from repairing the building, many pinnacles over the nave and towers were completed. The original 1912 construction plans were found inside the building, allowing for a faithful restoration.

== The building ==
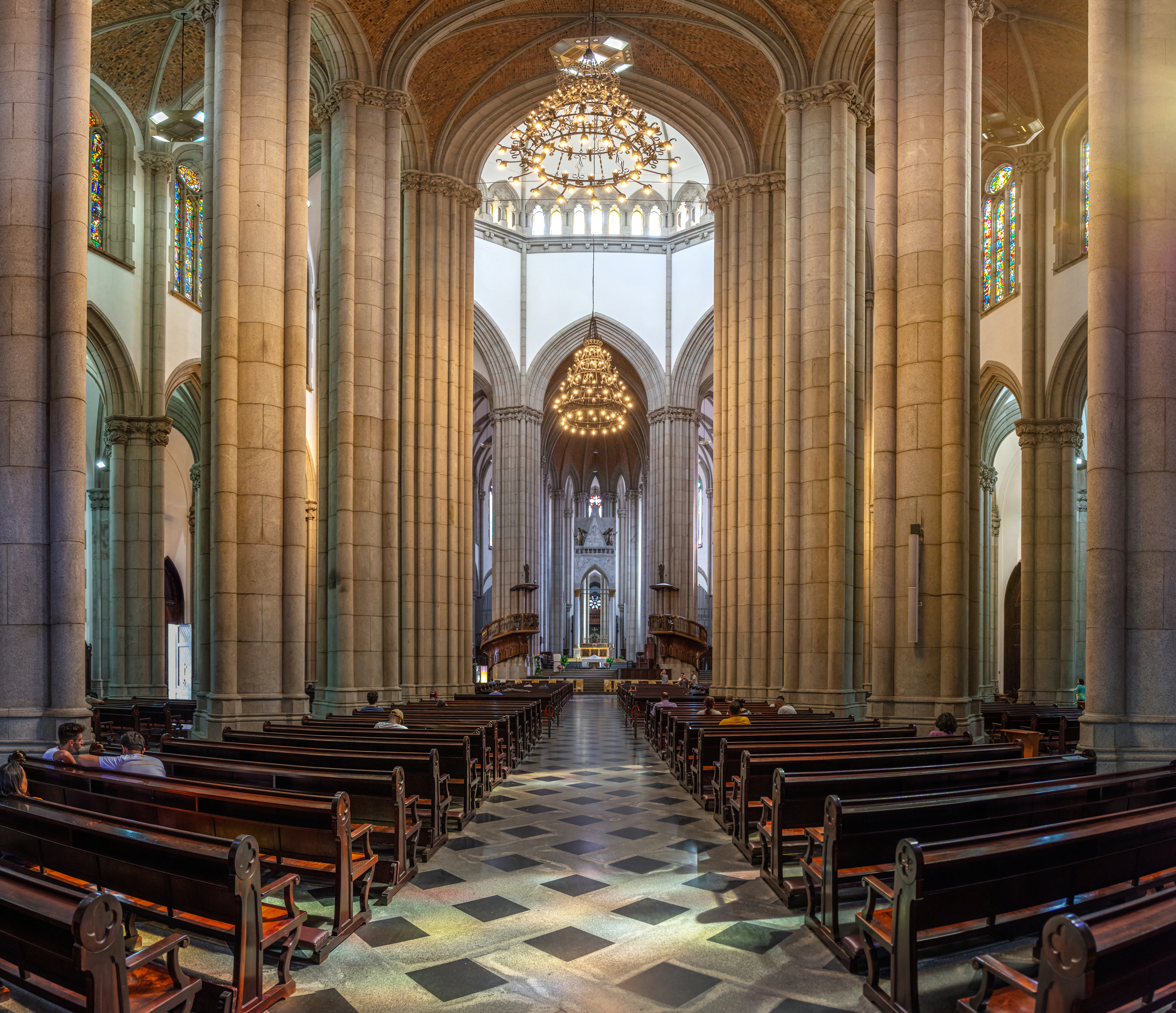
Cathedral interior

The cathedral is the largest Catholic Church in the city of São Paulo and second largest after the Pentecostal Templo de Salomão: 111 meters long, 46 meters wide, with the two flanking towers reaching a height of 92 meters. Its site area is 5,300 square meters, and its floor area is 6,700 square meters. The cathedral is a Latin cross church with a five-aisled nave and a dome that reaches 30 meters over the crossing. Although the building, in general, is Neo-Gothic, the dome is inspired by the Renaissance dome of the Cathedral of Florence. It is located in the Praça da Sé, or "See Square".

The cathedral has a total capacity for 8,000 people. More than 800 tons of rare marble were used in its completion. The inner capitals are decorated with sculpted Brazilian produce as coffee branches, pineapples, and native animals such as tatus --armadillos.

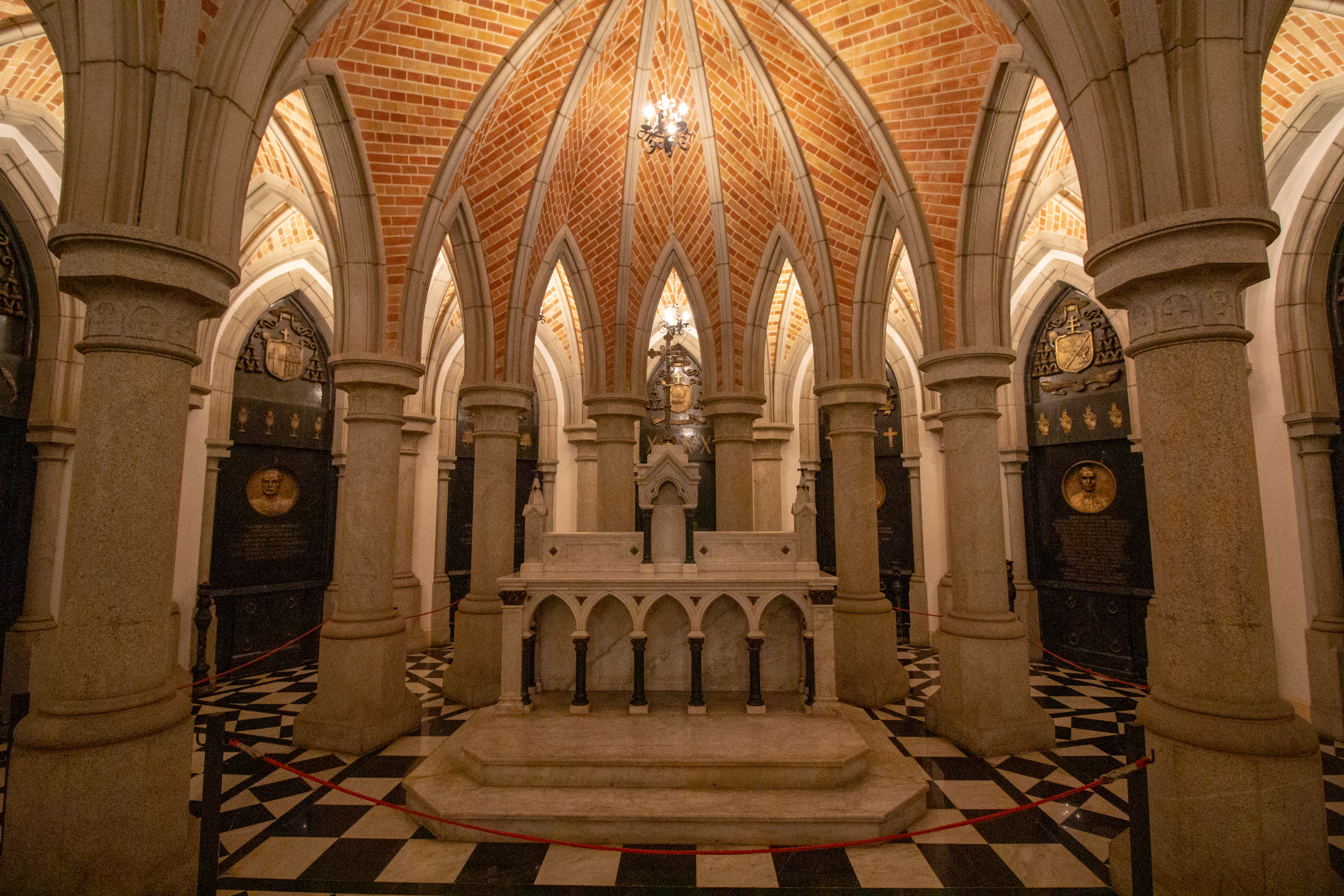
Crypt of São Paulo Cathedral

=== Crypt ===
The crypt, located below the main altar, is very large and can be considered an underground church in its own right. It is decorated with marble sculptures by Francisco Leopoldo e Silva depicting the history of Job and St Jerome.

The crypt has the tombs of all bishops and archbishops of São Paulo. Of special note are the bronze tombs of two important historical figures: Father Diogo Feijó and the cacique Tibiriçá. Feijó was regent of Brazil during the infancy of Emperor Pedro II. Tibiriçá was the cacique (chieftain) of the Guaianás tribe who, in the 16th century, welcomed the first Jesuits to the Piratininga Plateau and whose aid made the foundation of São Paulo possible.

In 2004, the human remains of Bartolomeu de Gusmão (1685–1724), a Jesuit from the former Portuguese colony of Brazil and innovator of lighter-than-air airship design, were transferred to the crypt.

=== Organ ===
The cathedral's organ, built in 1954 by the Italian firm Balbiani Vegezzi-Bossi, is one of the largest in Latin America. It has five keyboards, 329 stops, 120 registers, and 12,000 pipes, the mouths of which display hand-engraved reliefs in Gothic style.

=== Carillon ===
The east tower contains a carillon of 61 bells, cast by the Petit & Fritsen bellfoundry of the Netherlands and installed in 1959. It is the largest and heaviest carillon in Central and South America.

=== Window frames ===
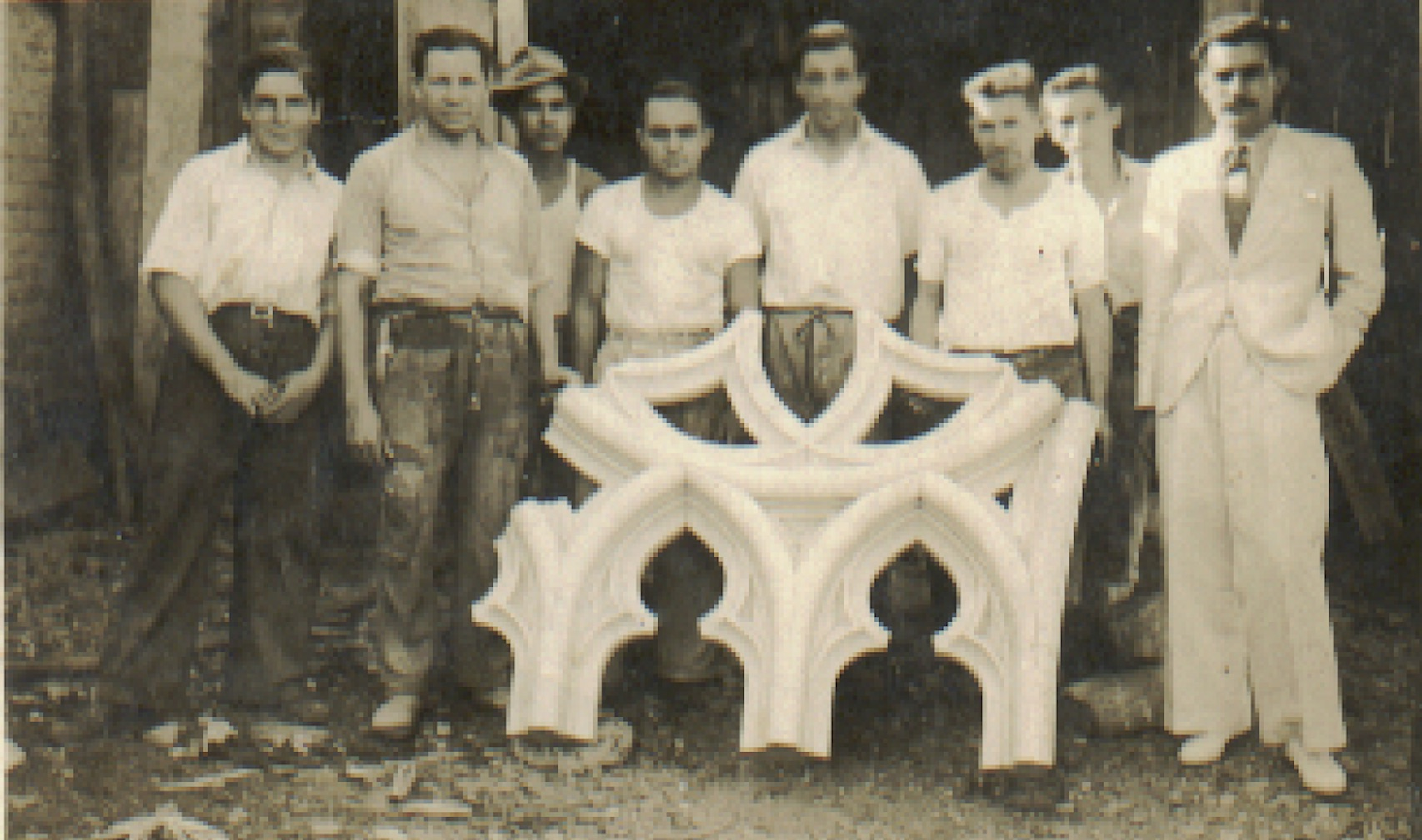
Team responsible for sculpting the window frames. The second from left to right was Angelo Palici and the fifth from left to right, in the center of the piece, was João Baccaro.

The window frames were made in granite, by a stonework company called Palici-Baccaro, founded by family members of Italian immigrants in the 1940s, having as partners Angelo Palici and João Baccaro, located at Oratório street, near Fernando Falcão street, region of the Mooca, São Paulo, Brazil, that later would give origin to Baccaro Marbles and Granites, traditional company in the local market.

=== Gallery ===
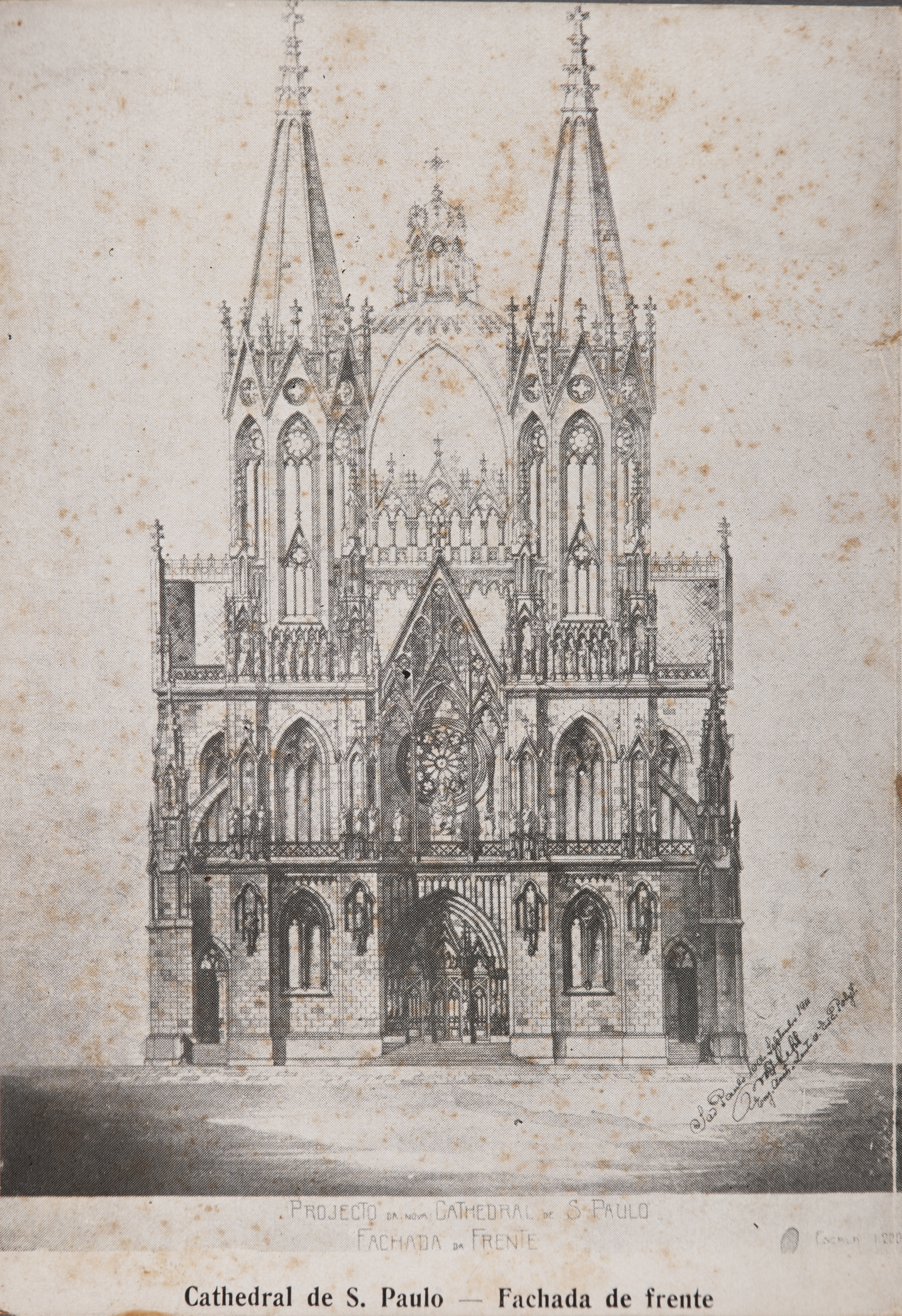

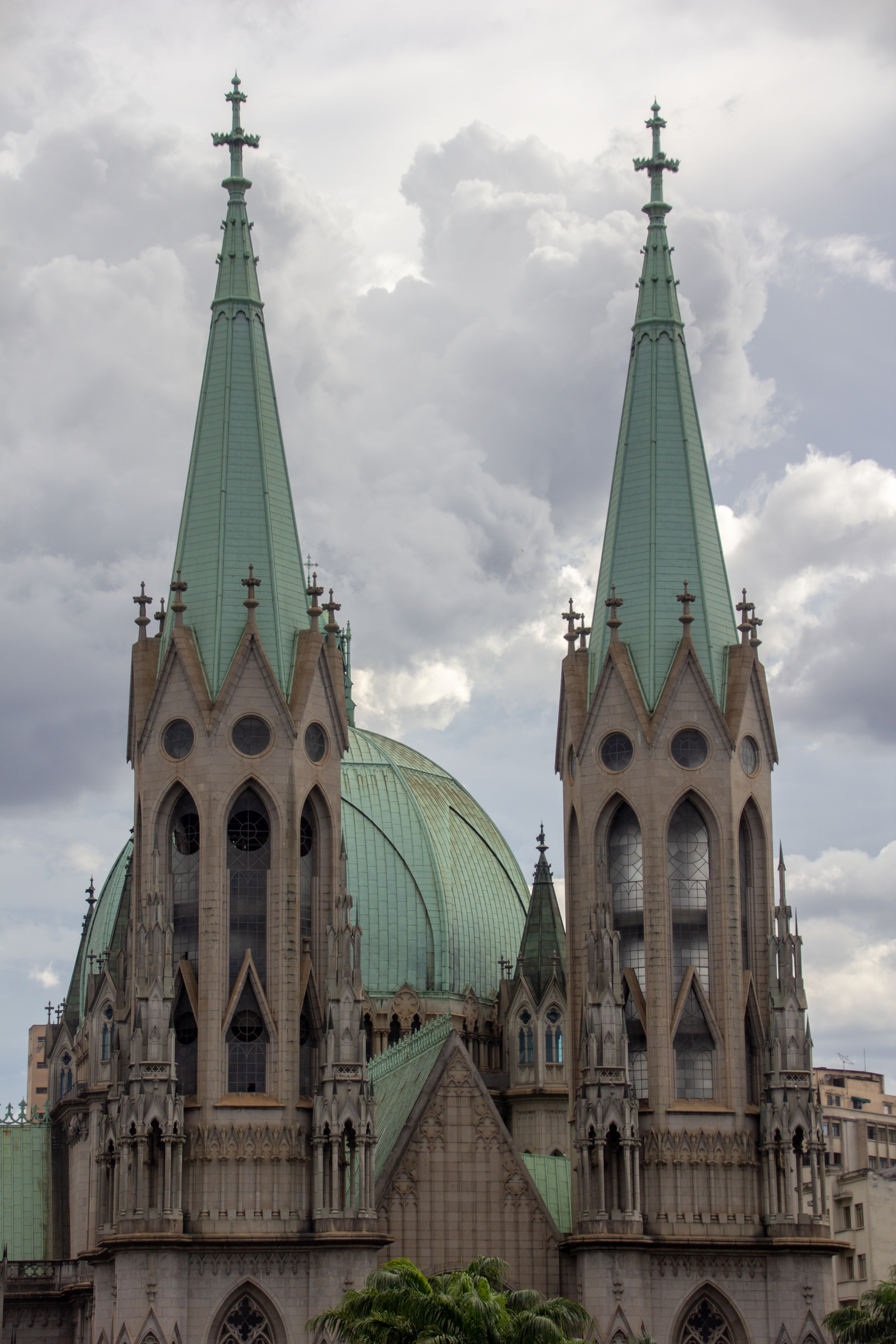
Both towers of the cathedral.

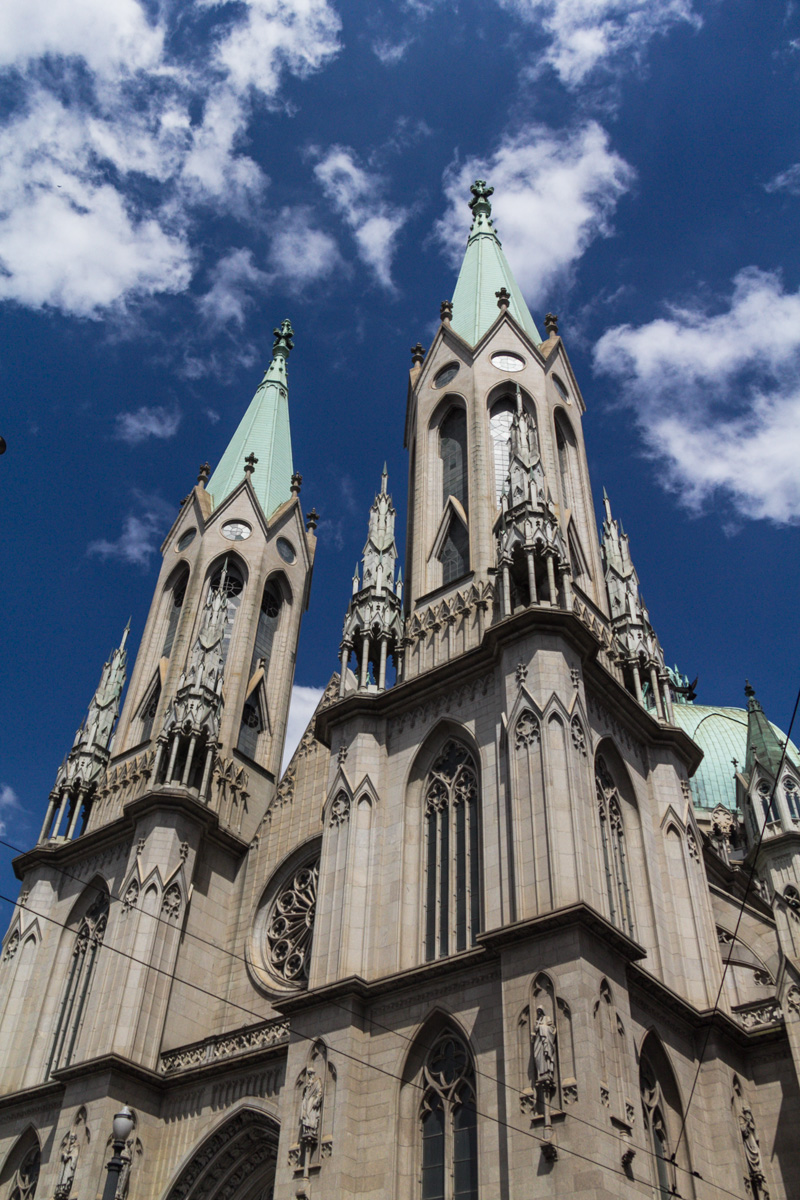
The cathedral's right tower.

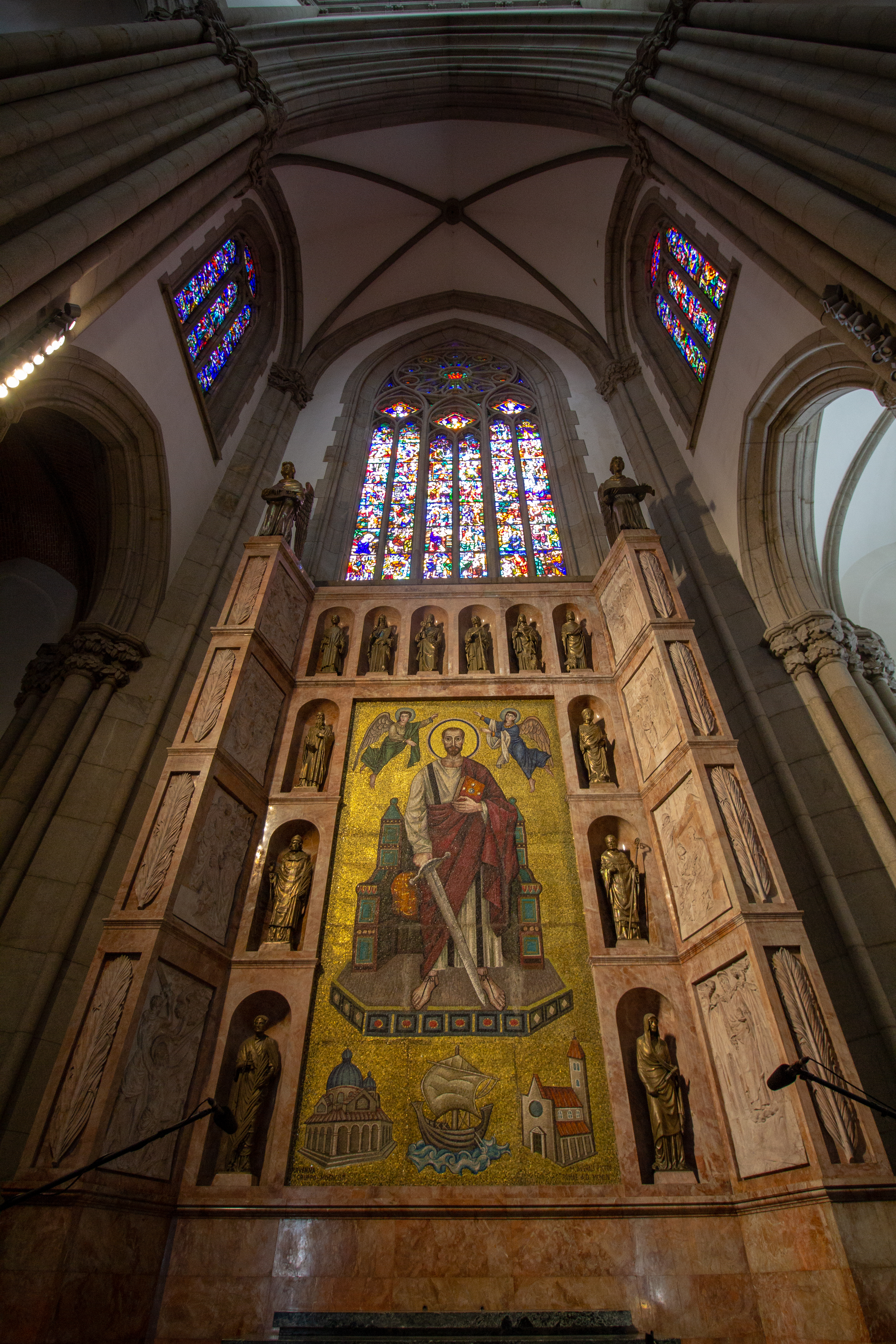
Side altar with a Saint Paul mosaic

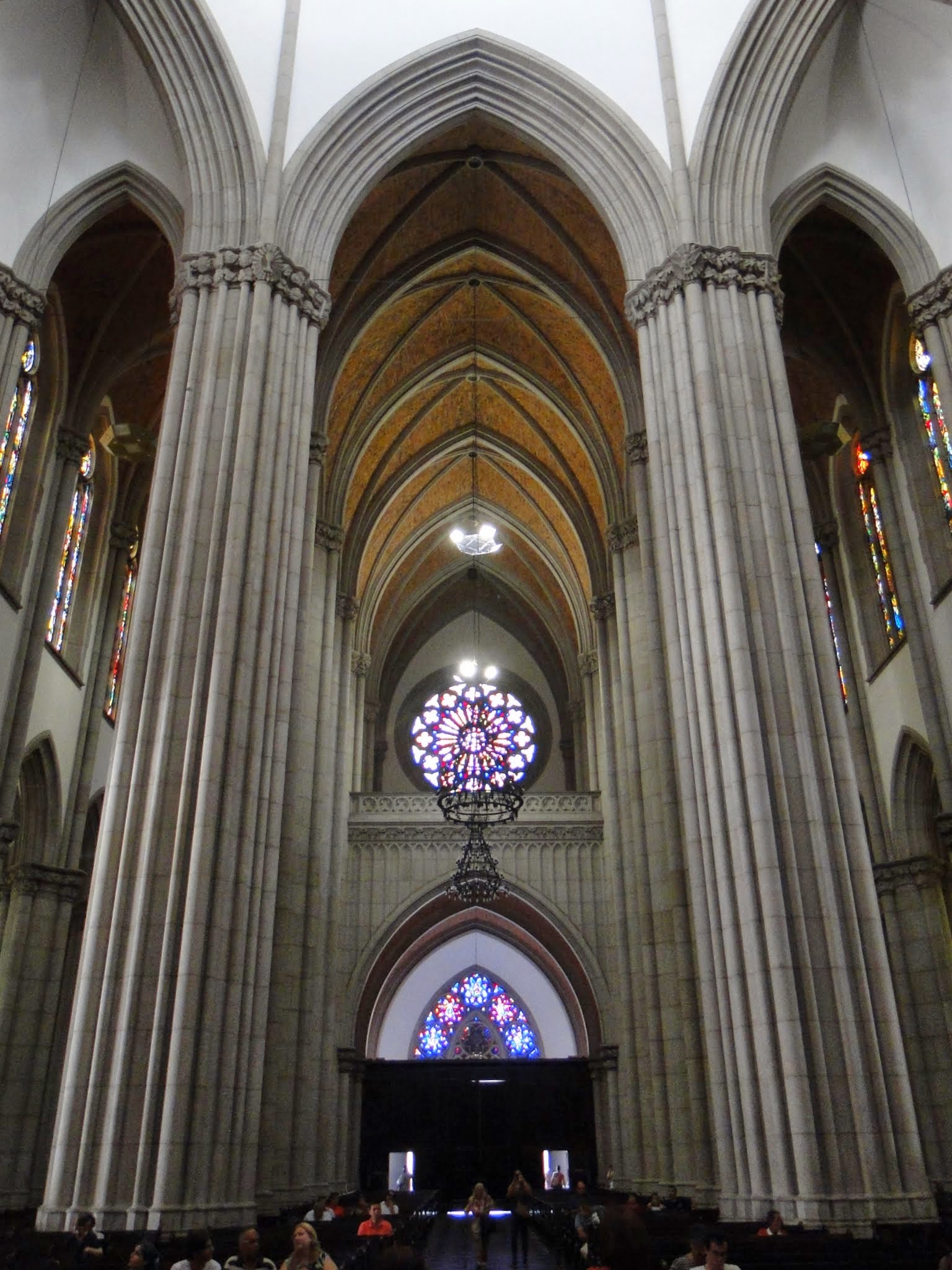

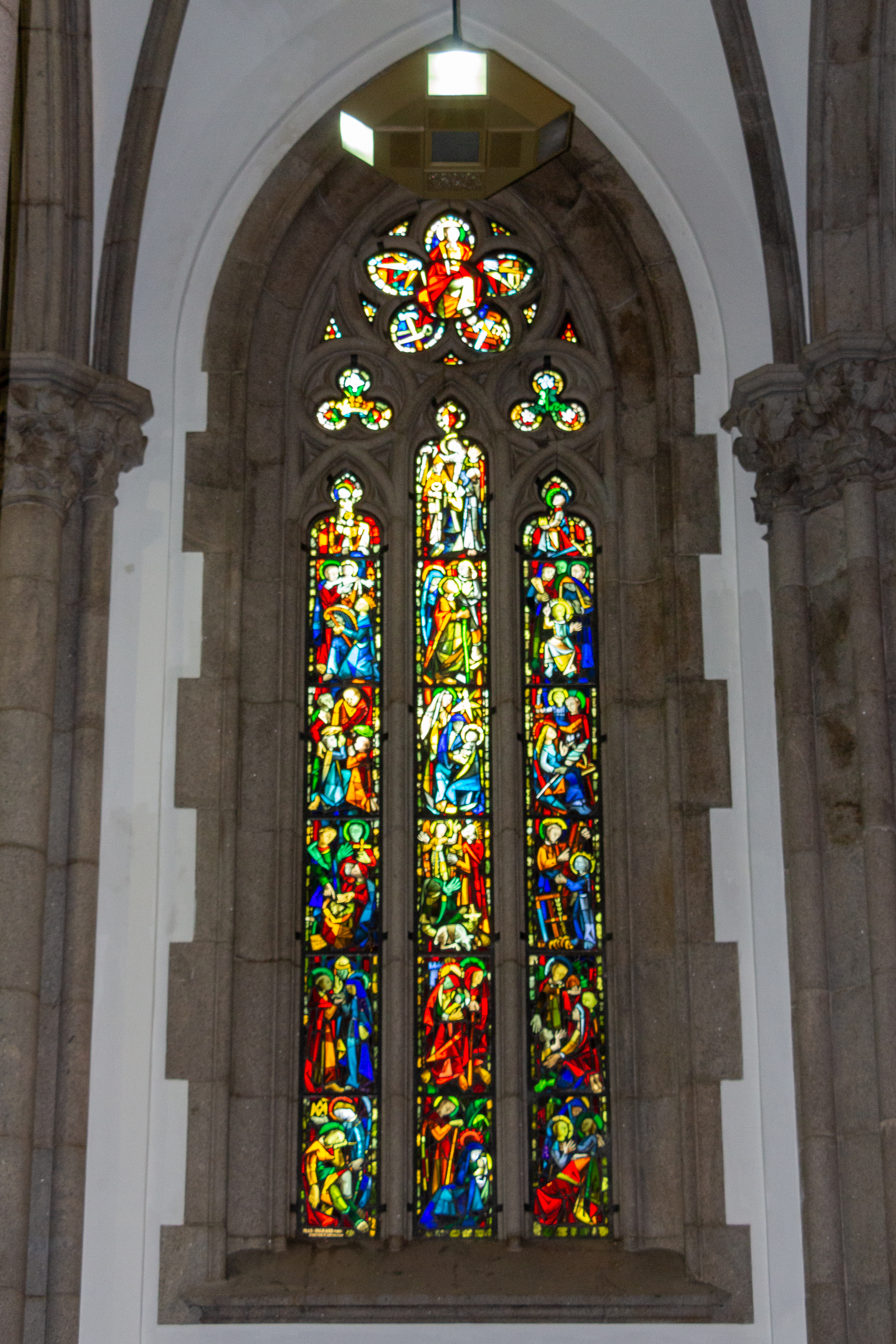

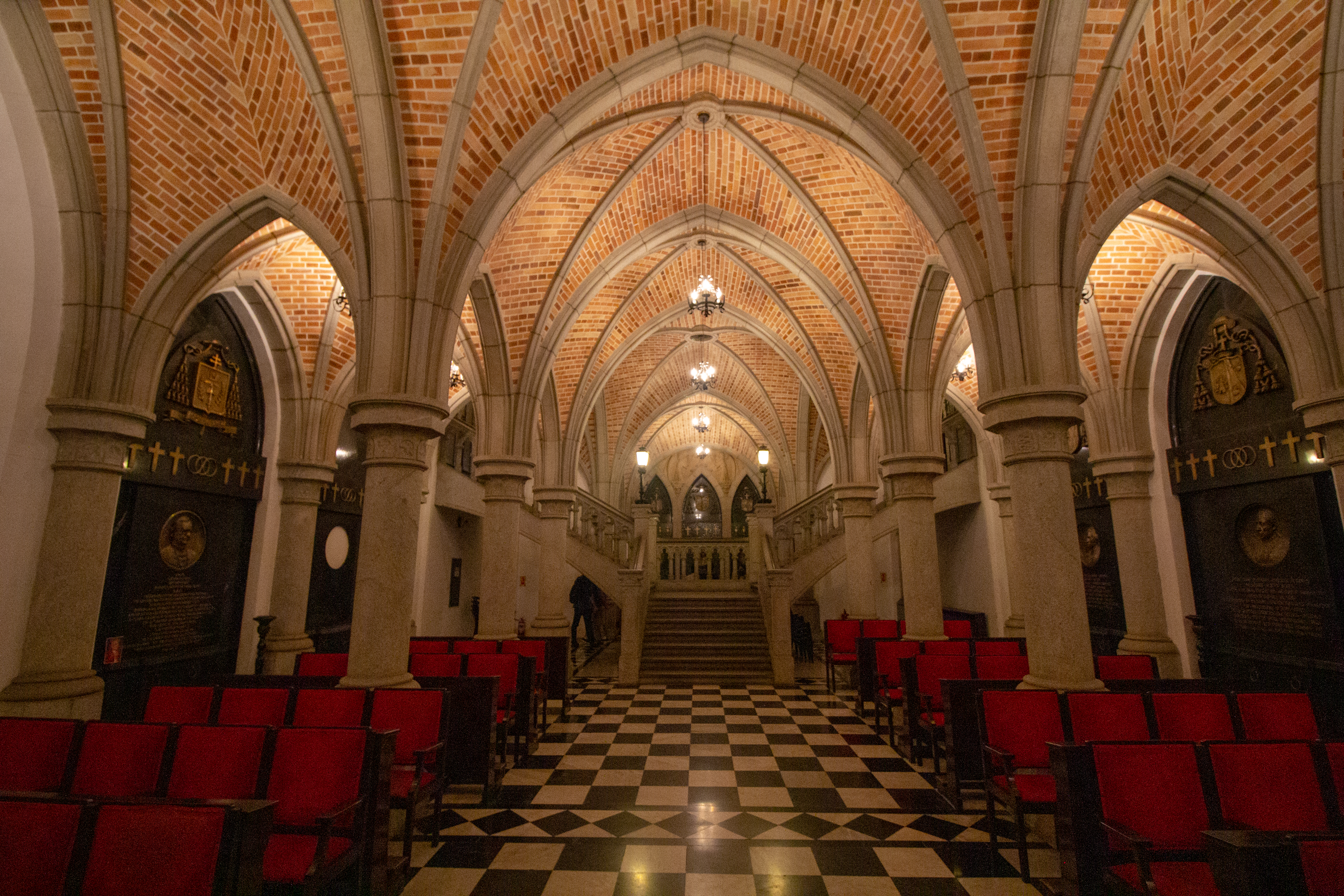
Crypt

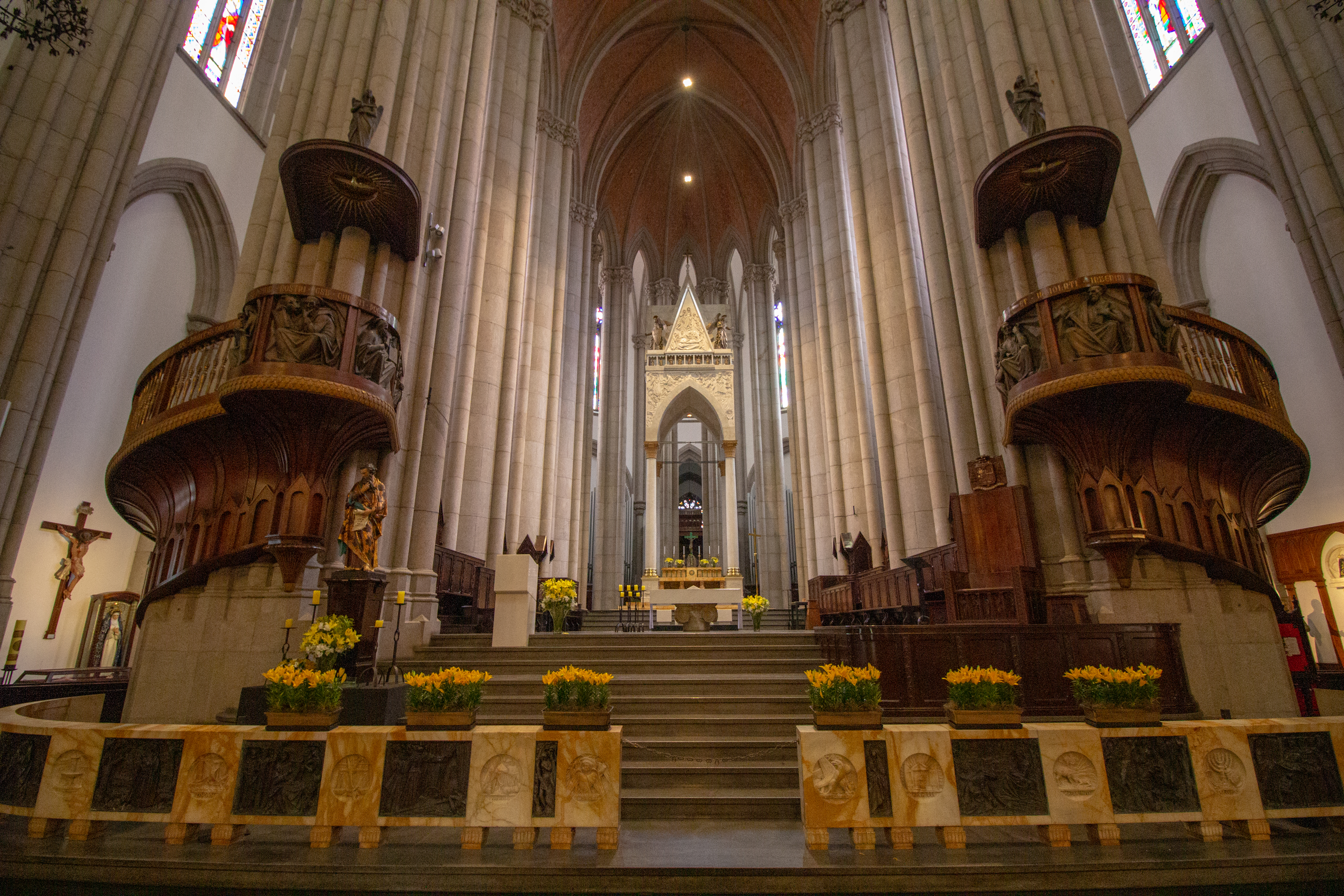
Main altar

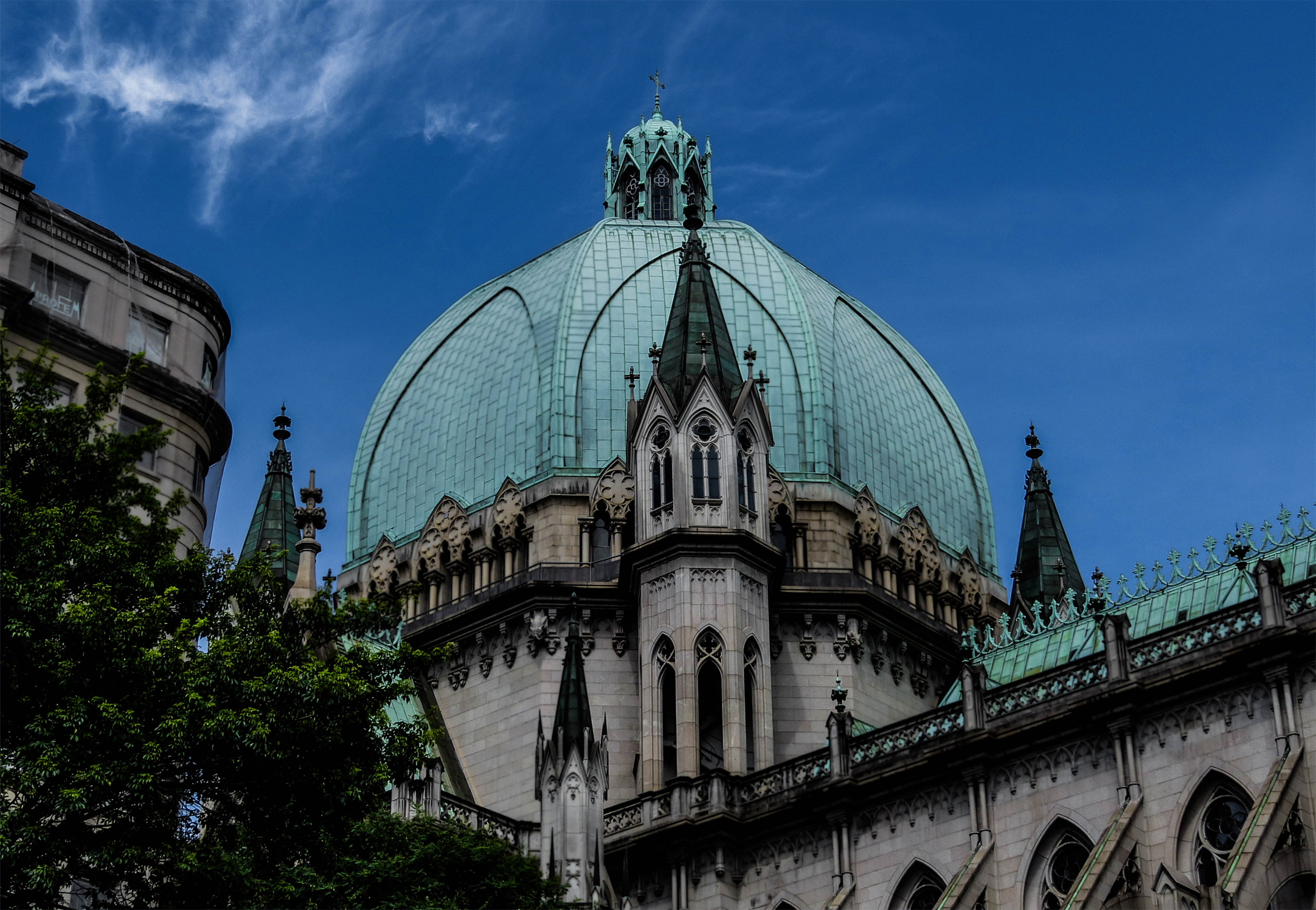
