= Santa Ifigênia Viaduct =

Viaduct in São Paulo, Brazil

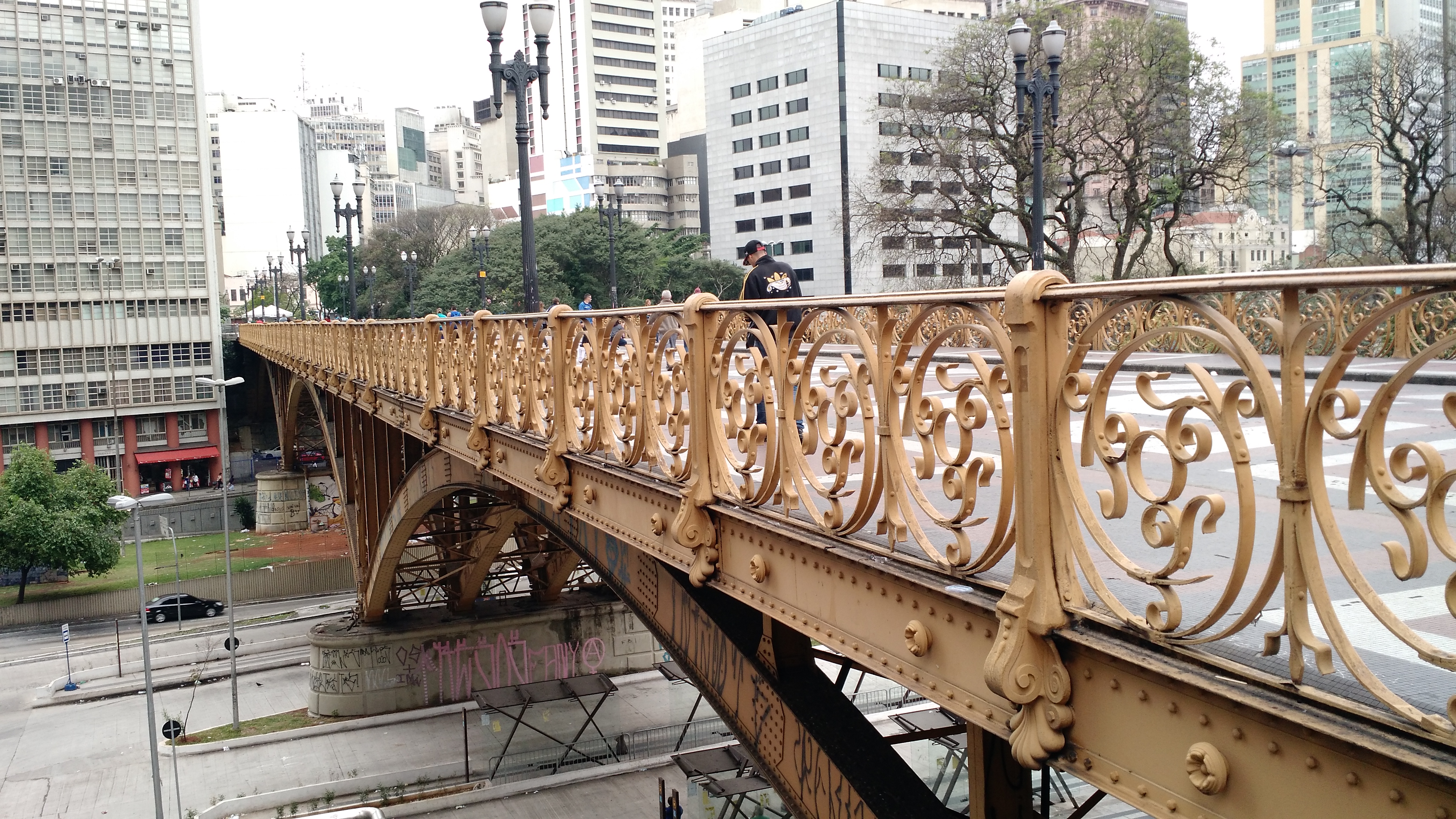
- Side view of the Santa Efigênia Viaduct, towards Largo São Bento

- Location within São Paulo
- Length: 225 m (738 ft)
- Location: São Paulo, São Paulo; Brazil
- Coordinates: 23°32′30″S 46°38′11″W

Construction
- Inauguration: 1913

The Santa Ifigênia Viaduct (Portuguese: Viaduto Santa Ifigênia) is located in the center of the Brazilian city of São Paulo. The route starts at Largo São Bento, next to the São Bento metro station, and finishes in front of the Church of St. Efigenia, connecting two of the city's historic landmarks. It is used exclusively by pedestrians.

Designed by architect Giulio Micheli and developed by engineers Giuseppe Chiapori and Mário Tibiriçá, the structure was produced in Belgium and intended to improve the traffic and circulation of cars, carriages and streetcars crossing the Anhangabaú Valley during the 19th century. The viaduct was built between 1910 and 1913 and inaugurated on July 26, 1913, by Mayor Raymundo Duprat.

Today, the Santa Ifigênia Viaduct crosses the Anhangabaú Valley and Prestes Maia Avenue and connects the old and new city centers. Designed in the Art Nouveau style, the place is one of São Paulo's main postcards. Between the Santa Ifigênia Viaduct and Duque de Caxias Street, there are several stores and small galleries selling different types of electronic products, such as computers, video games, cell phones, sound and lighting equipment and musical instruments.

== History ==
At the end of the 19th century, São Paulo's population multiplied and its urban network expanded due to the coffee economy, which created a demand for improvements in the city's transportation and traffic. In 1901, a project for a viaduct linking Largo São Bento to Largo de Santa Ifigênia was submitted to the City Council. The project became the second viaduct to cross the Anhangabaú Valley, as there was already the Chá Viaduct, inaugurated in 1892. Construction of the Santa Ifigênia Viaduct began in 1910 and ended in 1913, during the term of Mayor Raymundo Duprat. A loan of £250,000 from the British was required for the construction of the project, representing the first foreign debt incurred by São Paulo City Hall.

The viaduct structure was manufactured in Belgium. Around 1,100 tons of metal structure were unloaded at the port of Santos and arrived in the area via the São Paulo Railway. Assembly work was carried out by the Lidgerwood Manufacturing Company Limited under the direction of engineer Giuseppe Chiappori, a partner of Giulio Micheli and Mário Tibiriçá. The German master builder and carpenter Johann Grundt was responsible for laying the foundations. Due to expropriations and compensation, a lack of qualified labor and a limited budget, the Santa Ifigênia Viaduct was inaugurated on July 26, 1913, a year later than planned, by Mayor Raymundo Duprat.

Besides connecting Largo São Bento and Largo Santa Ifigênia, the viaduct's aim also included improving the traffic of cars and carriages on the slopes of the São João Avenue, XV de Novembro Street and São Bento Street, where the streetcars used to pass. In the 1970s, the viaduct was protected by a Municipal Zoning Law. It also underwent a renovation that restored the structure and made it pedestrian-only. The light fittings were replaced with old ones, the paving was changed to colored tiles and a staircase was installed to give access to the Anhangabaú Valley.

== Architecture ==
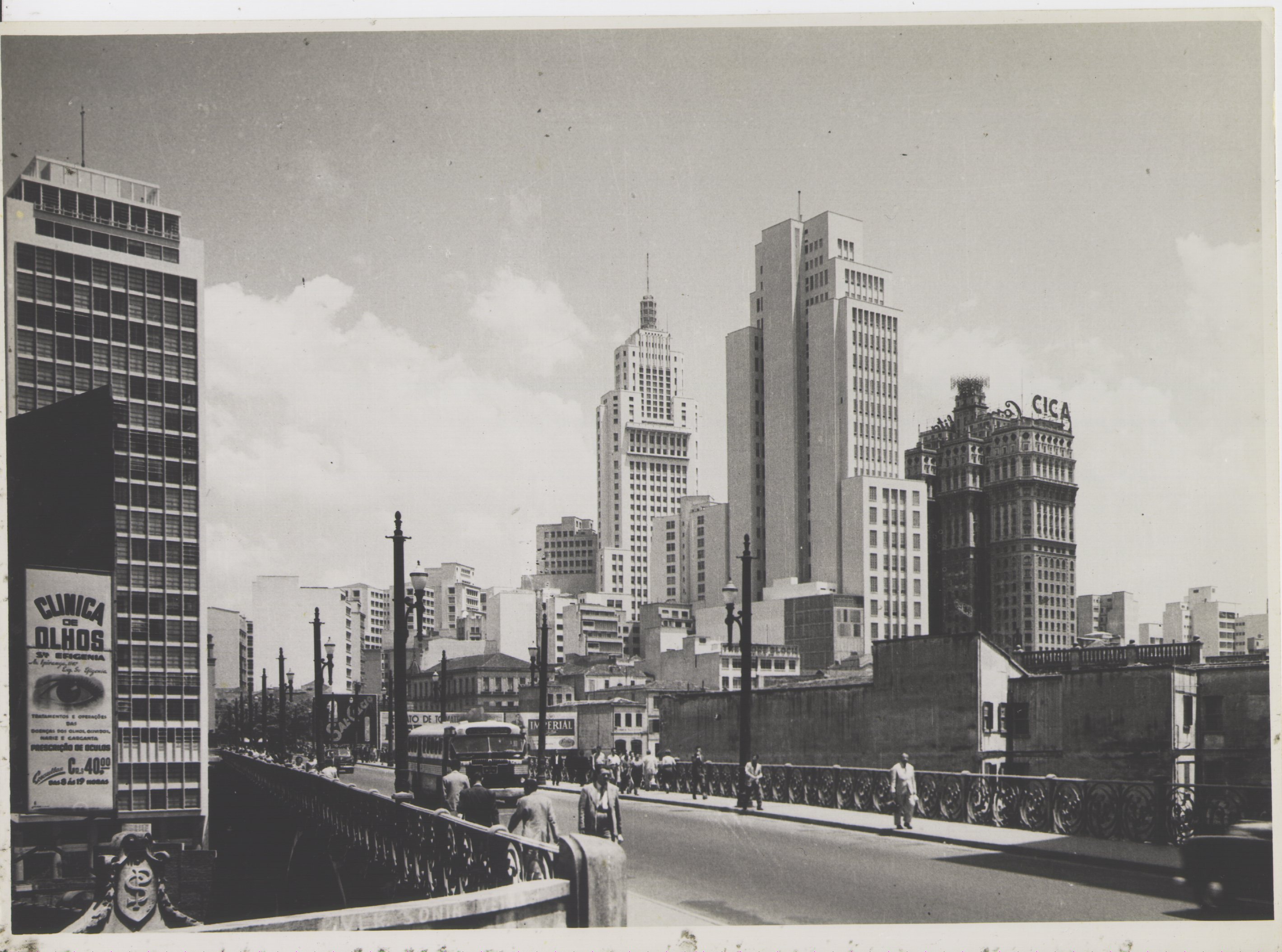
Santa Ifigênia Viaduct, mid-20th century.

The Santa Ifigênia Viaduct is an elevated pedestrian passage over Prestes Maia Avenue, connecting Largo de São Bento to Largo de Santa Ifigênia. It has concrete bases decorated with pillars from which metal arches emerge. It was designed by architect Giulio Micheli and engineers Giuseppe Chiapori and Mário Tibiriçá. The tessellated floor on concrete slabs forms tricolored geometric carpets. There are also small ditches with metal grids to collect rainwater.

The Santa Ifigênia Viaduct is also accessible from a staircase paved with rubber pads in Pedro Lessa Square, where the Bandeira Terminal is currently located, next to the Mirante do Vale Building. It was built from 1,100 tons of iron from Belgium, which together create the Art Nouveau style. In 1978, it was refurbished and re-inaugurated with a promenade made with parts from the same company that had supplied the original structures. In 1982, it was painted in rainbow colors. The Art Nouveau style is visible in the viaduct's railings, which highlight the curved lines and shapes inspired by flowers and foliage.

== Cultural importance ==
The Santa Ifigênia Viaduct is a 225-meter road marked by the economic and cultural progress of the city of São Paulo during the 19th century. The viaduct was designed to improve circulation within São Paulo and, over the years, it has become one of the city's main tourist attractions. Currently, it is exclusively for crossing people, connecting important points in the new and old city centers, such as Santa Ifigênia Street, Cásper Líbero Avenue, Antônio de Godói Street and Largo do Paissandú. It was the first major road project in São Paulo to be widely documented through photography.

== Current status ==
Despite being protected by the Zoning Law and listed as a historical and cultural heritage site in the city of São Paulo, the Santa Ifigênia Viaduct is subject to vandalism. Currently, the structure is solid but damaged. There are broken posts used as garbage cans, rust on the metal parts, loose tiles on the floor and stairs and also homeless people located in Pedro Lessa Square who live under the viaduct's roof.

In 2024, São Paulo City Hall announced the renovation of the Santa Ifigência Viaduct. The work includes rebuilding the slab under the tiles, waterproofing to prevent future infiltration and regularizing the base to ensure a solid and durable foundation. The work is expected to cost R$6.5 million and is scheduled for completion in August this year.

== Gallery ==
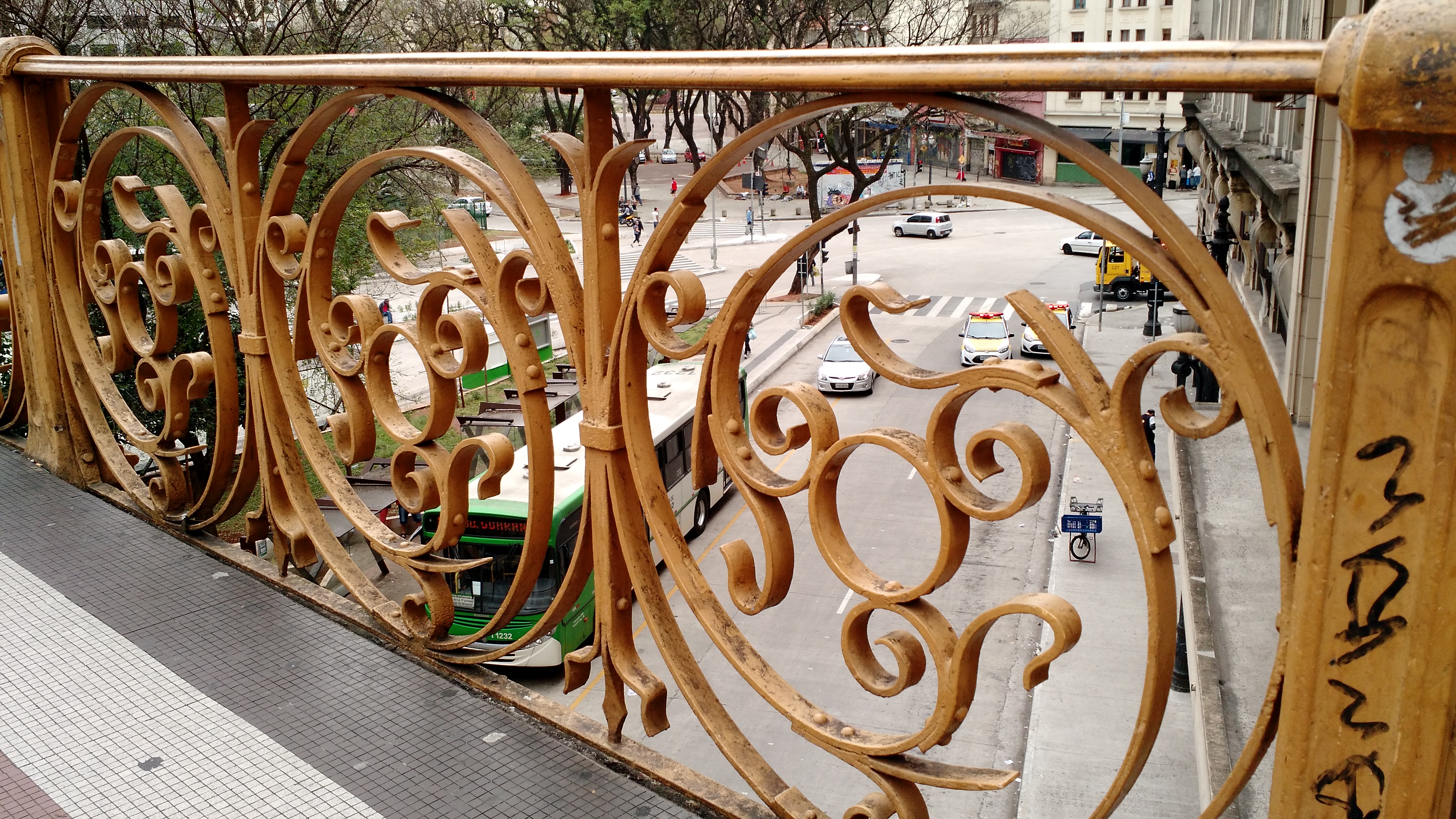
Decorated railings on the Santa Ifigênia Viaduct.

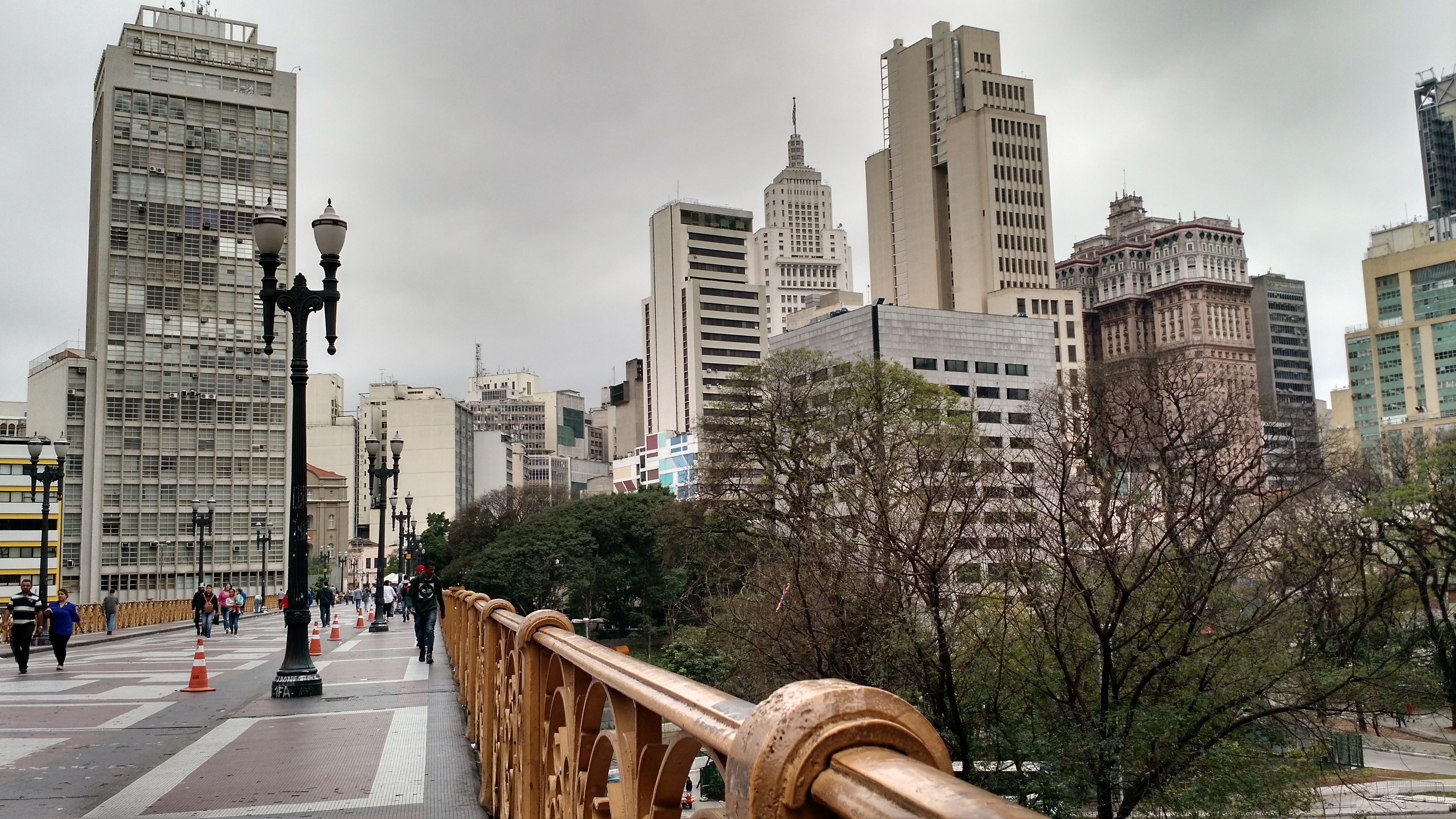
View from the viaduct,

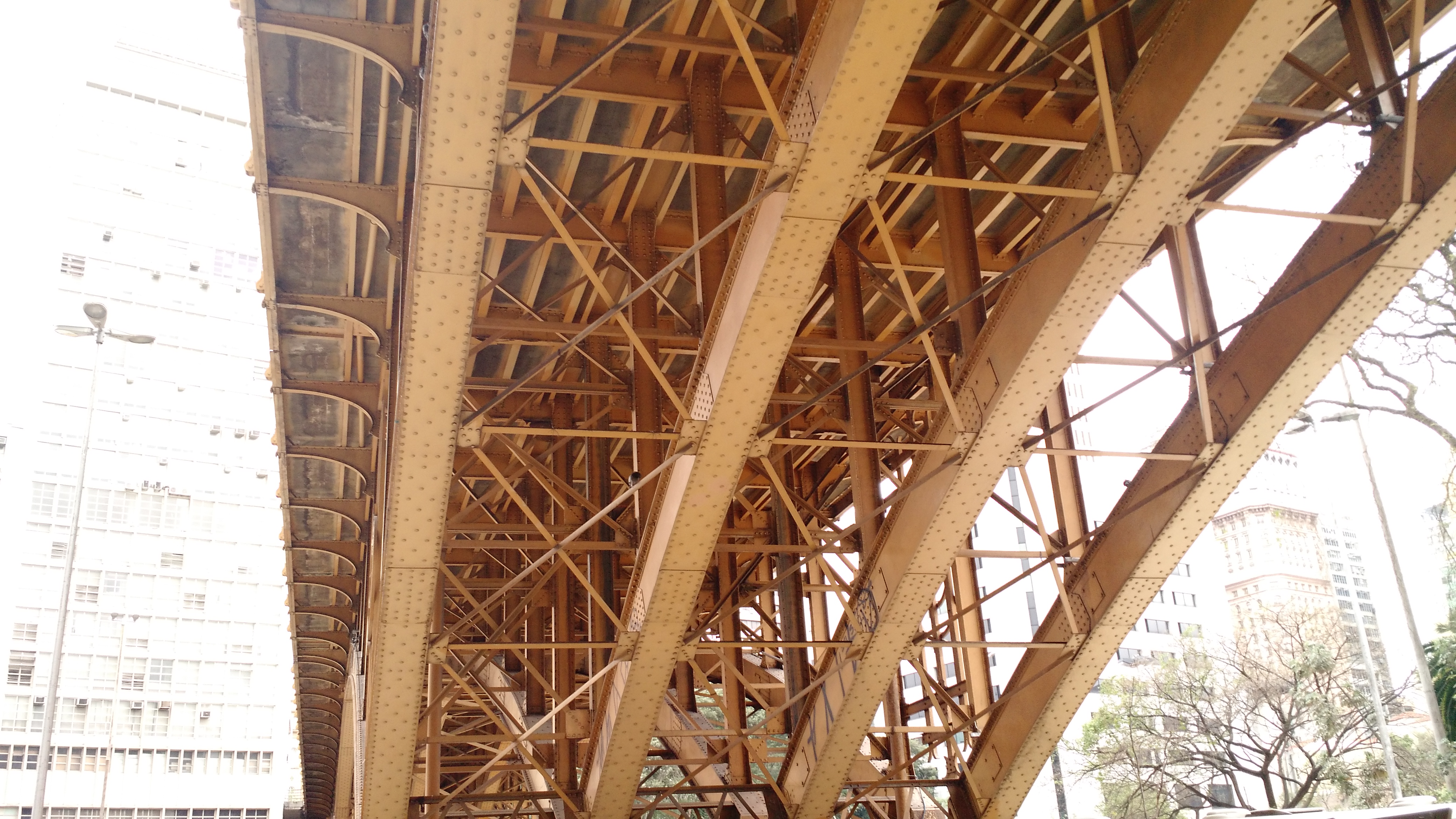
Viaduct support structure.

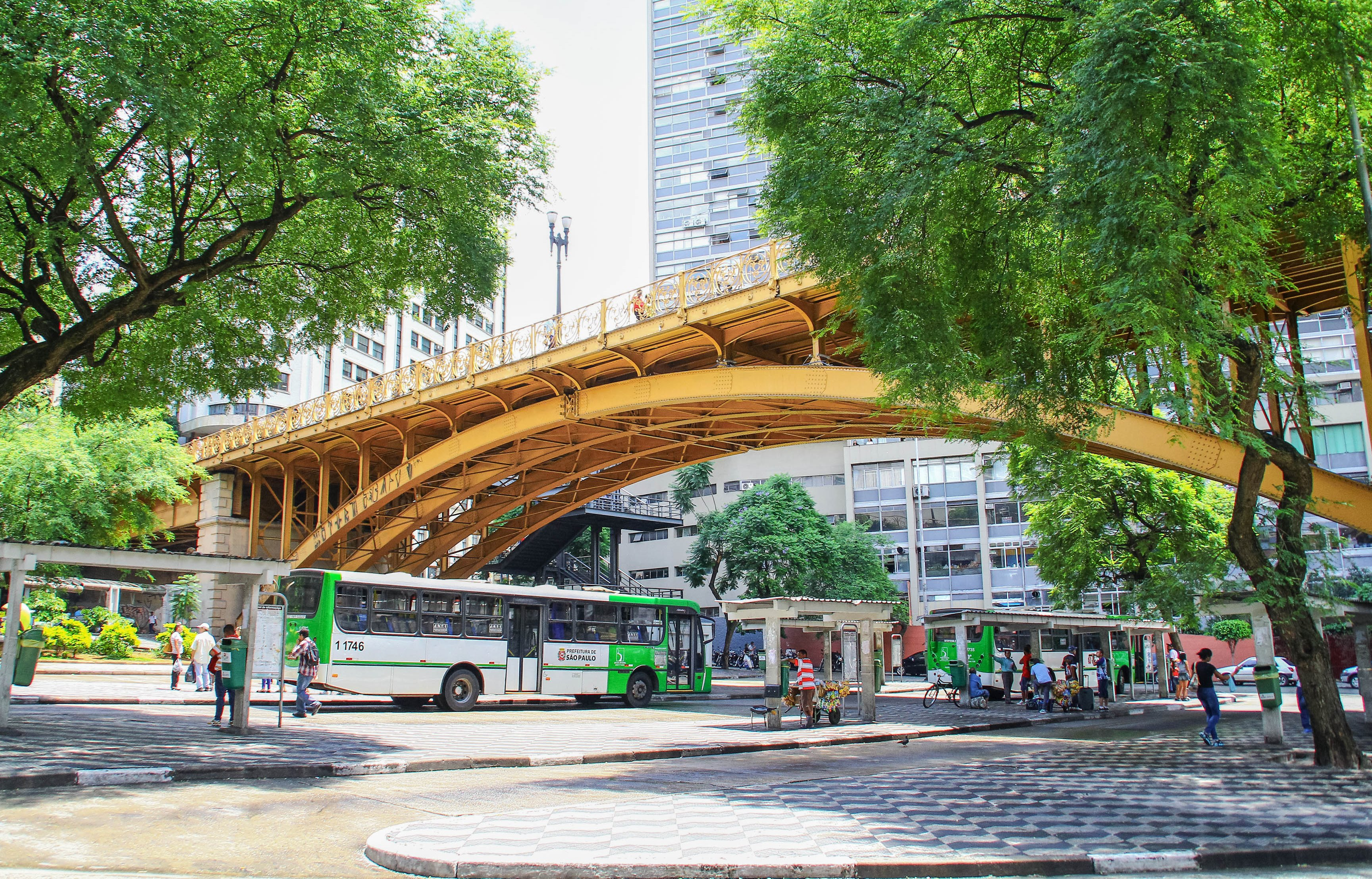
Viaduct seen from the Bandeira Terminal.

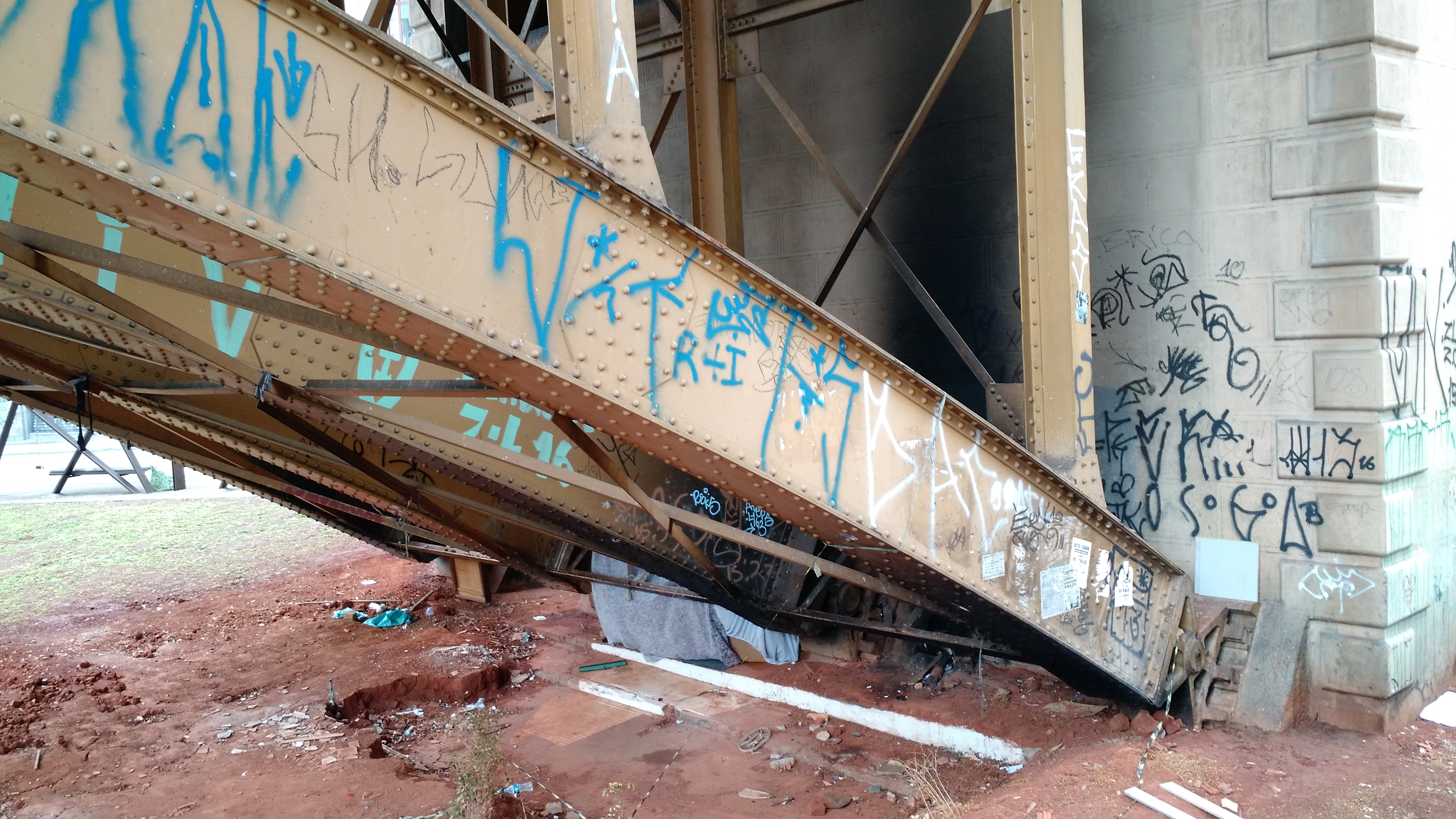
Graffiti on the viaduct's support structure.

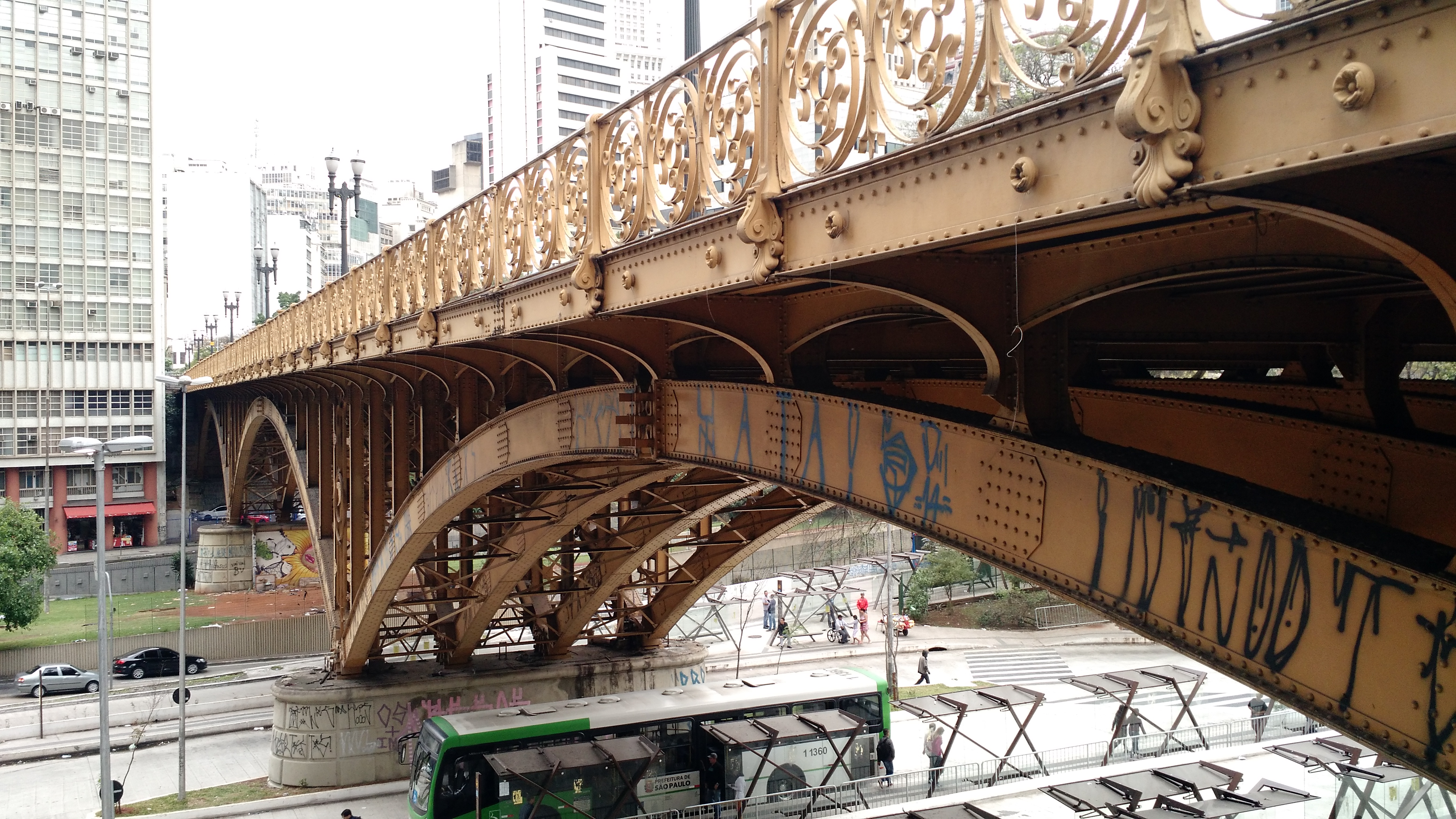
Viaduct support structure.

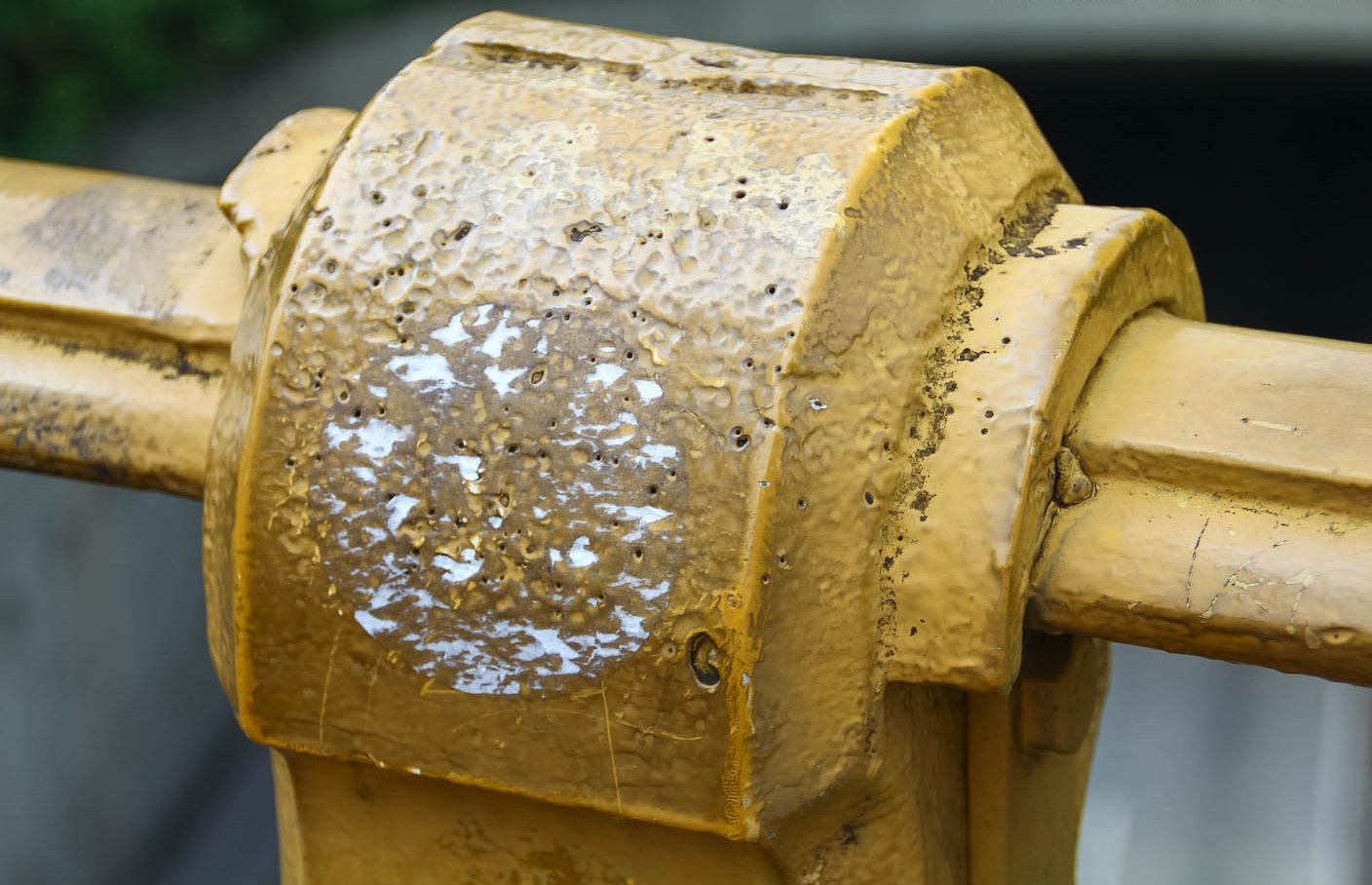
Viaduct's metal structure degraded by time.

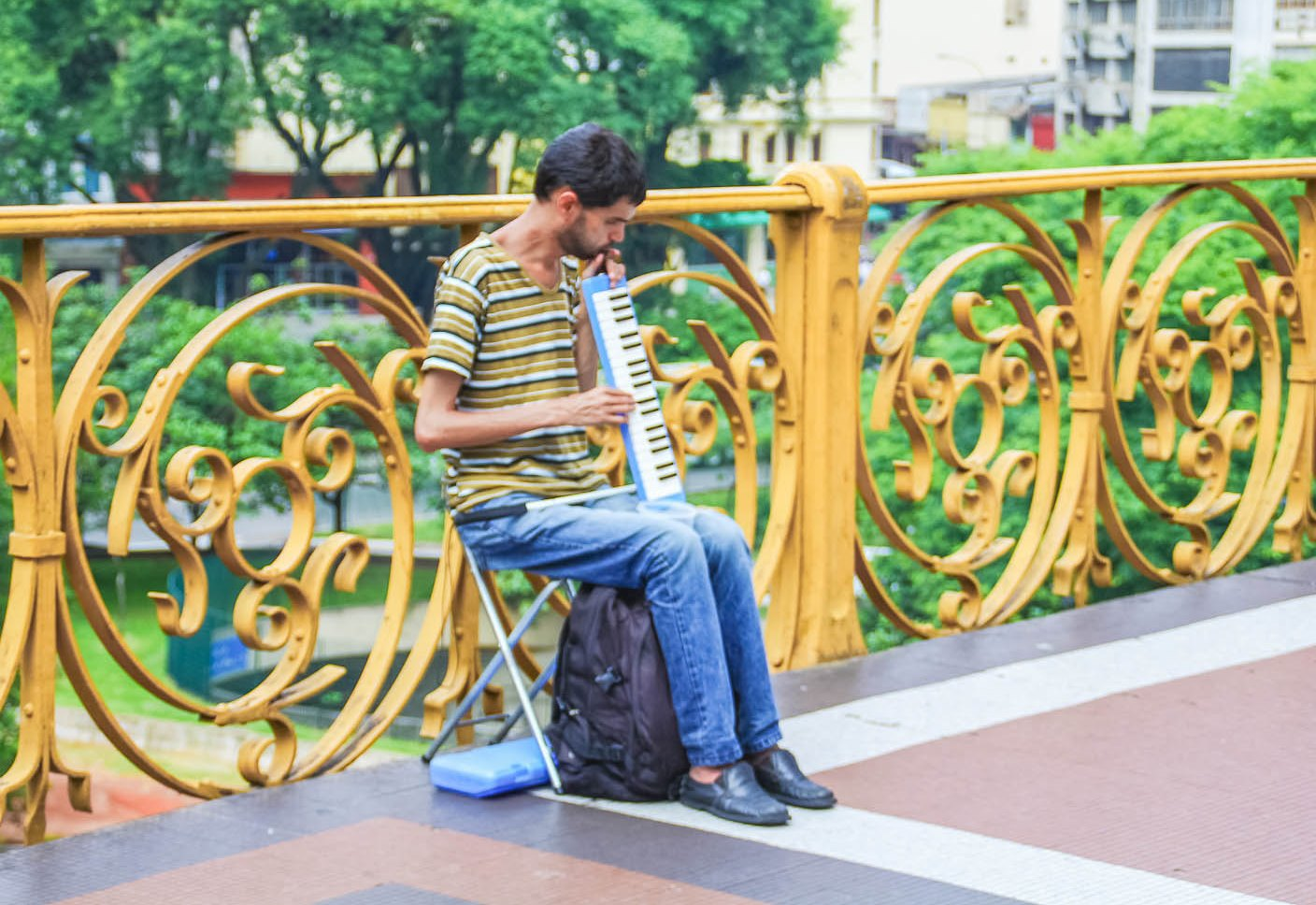
Street musician playing on the viaduct.

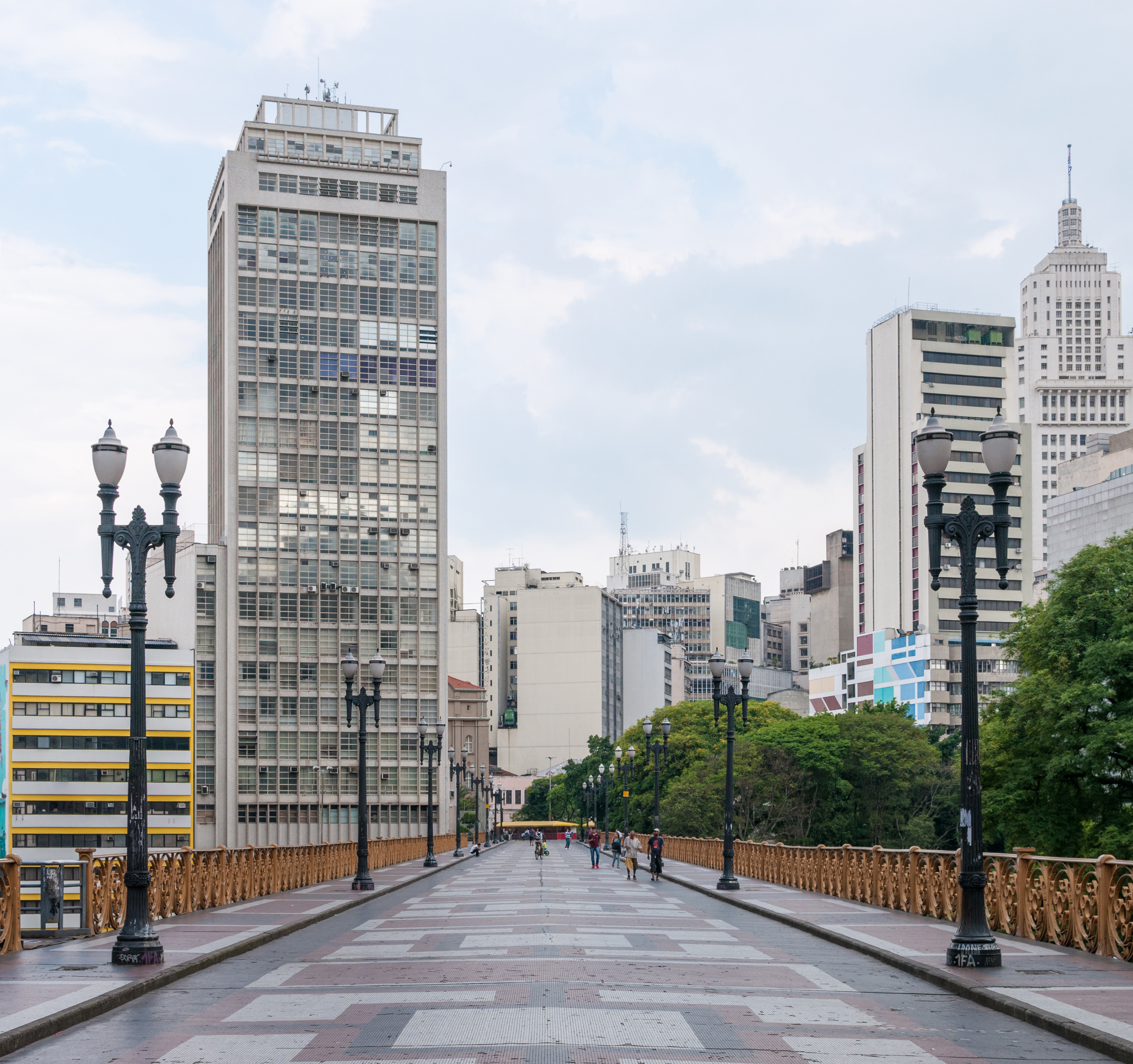
Tessellation mural on the viaduct floor.

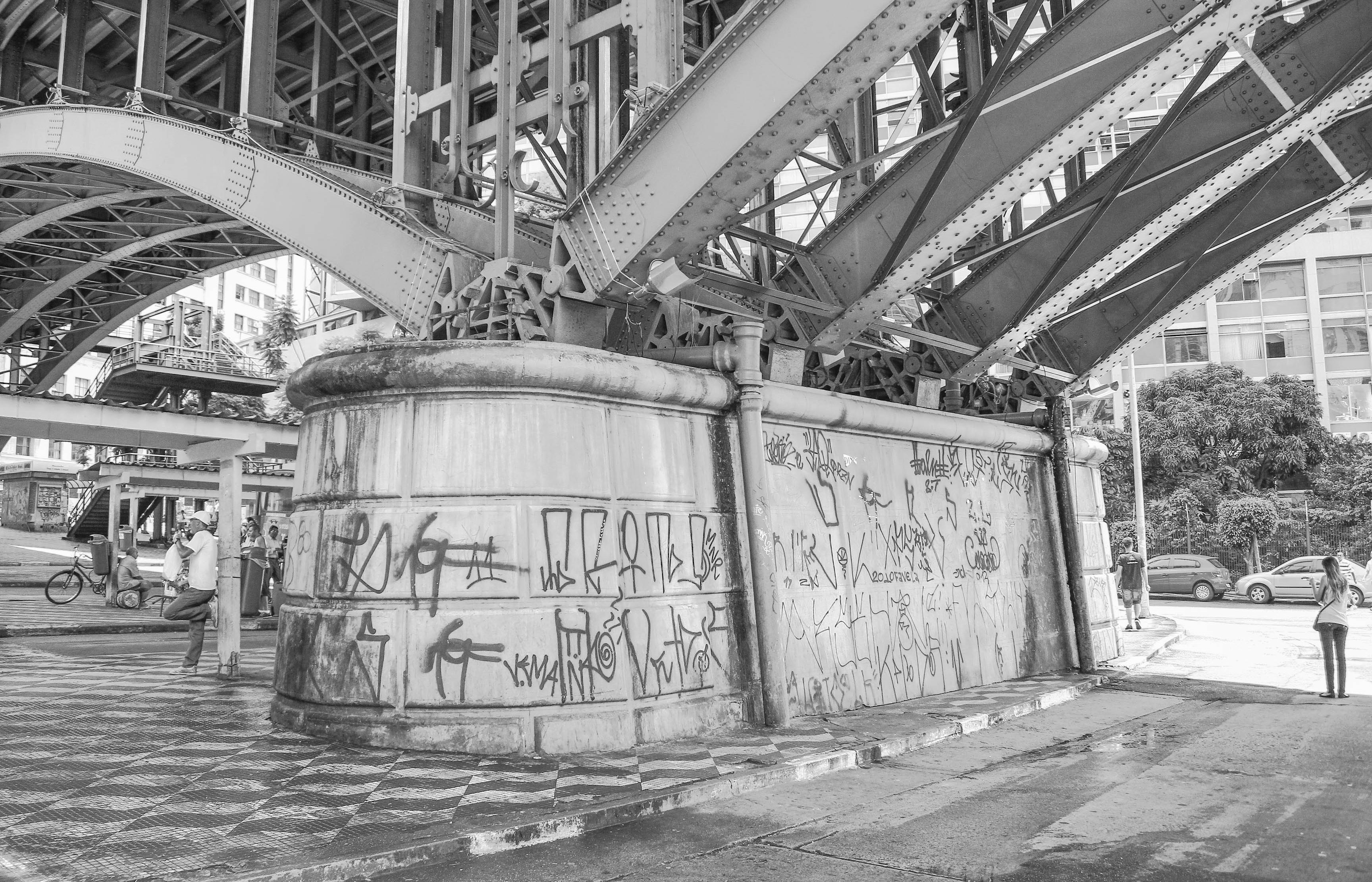
Viaduct support structure.

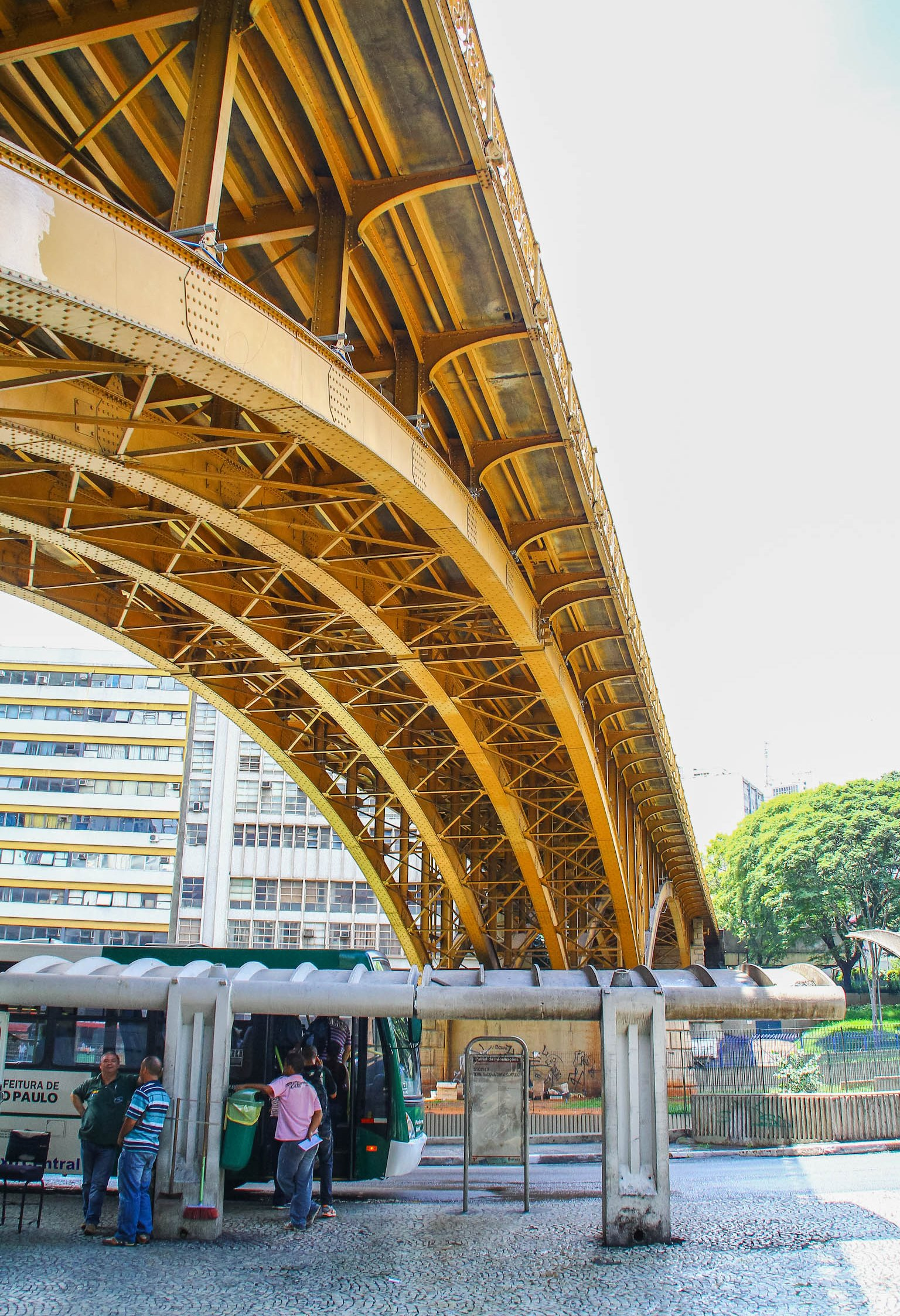
Viaduct structure seen from below.

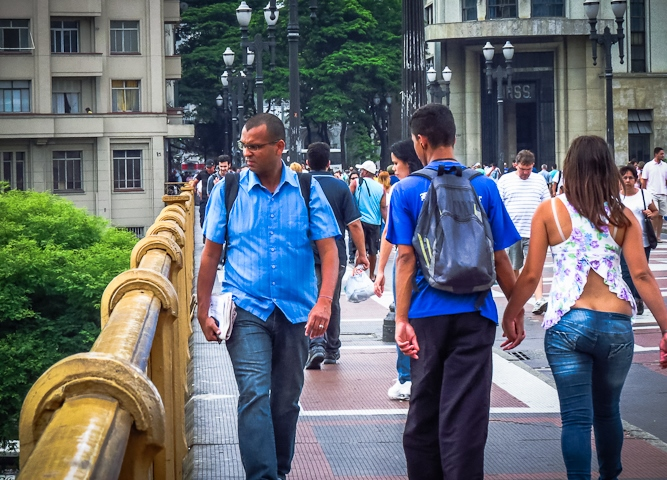
Pedestrians on the viaduct.

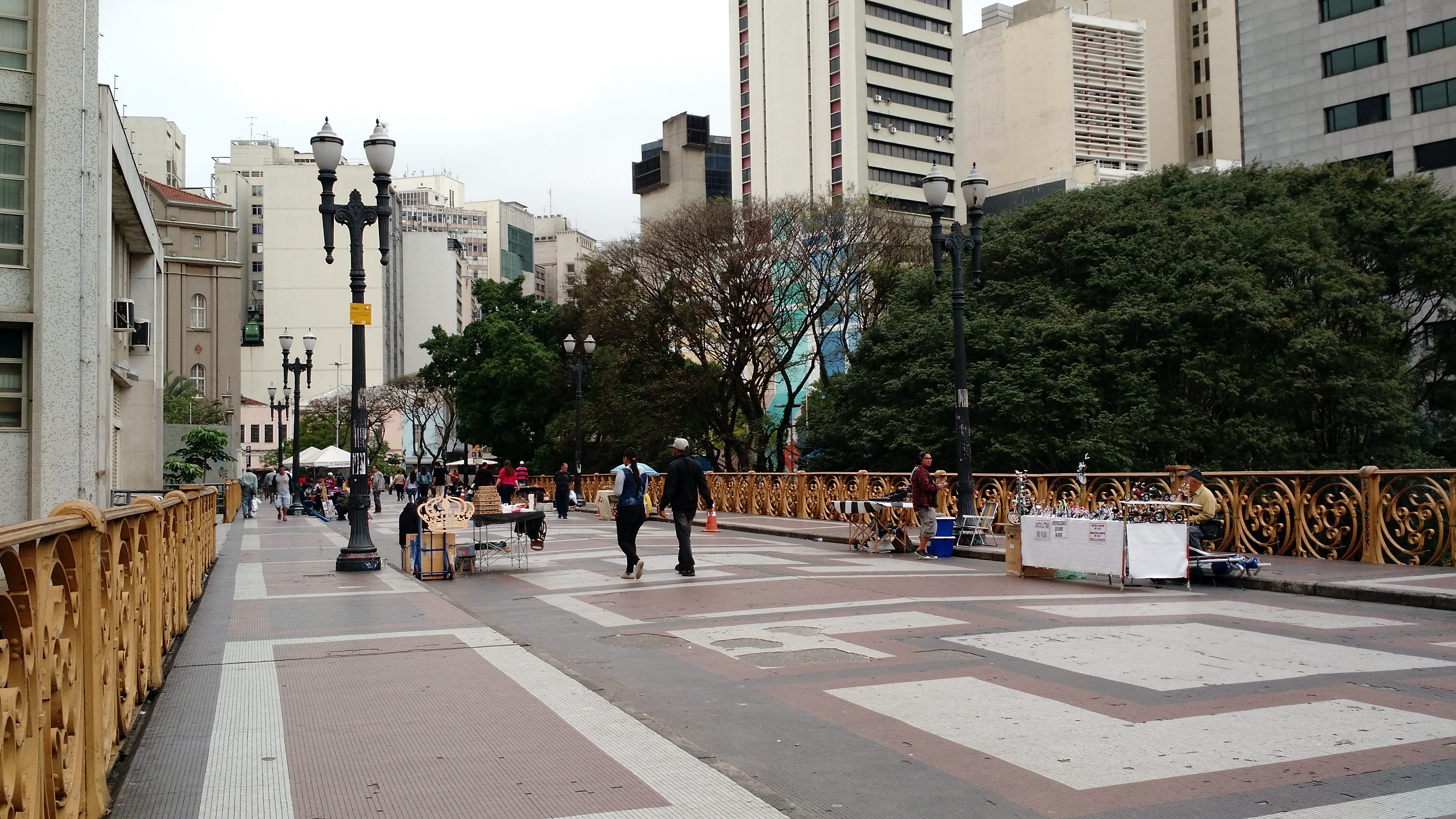
Traders and pedestrians on the viaduct.

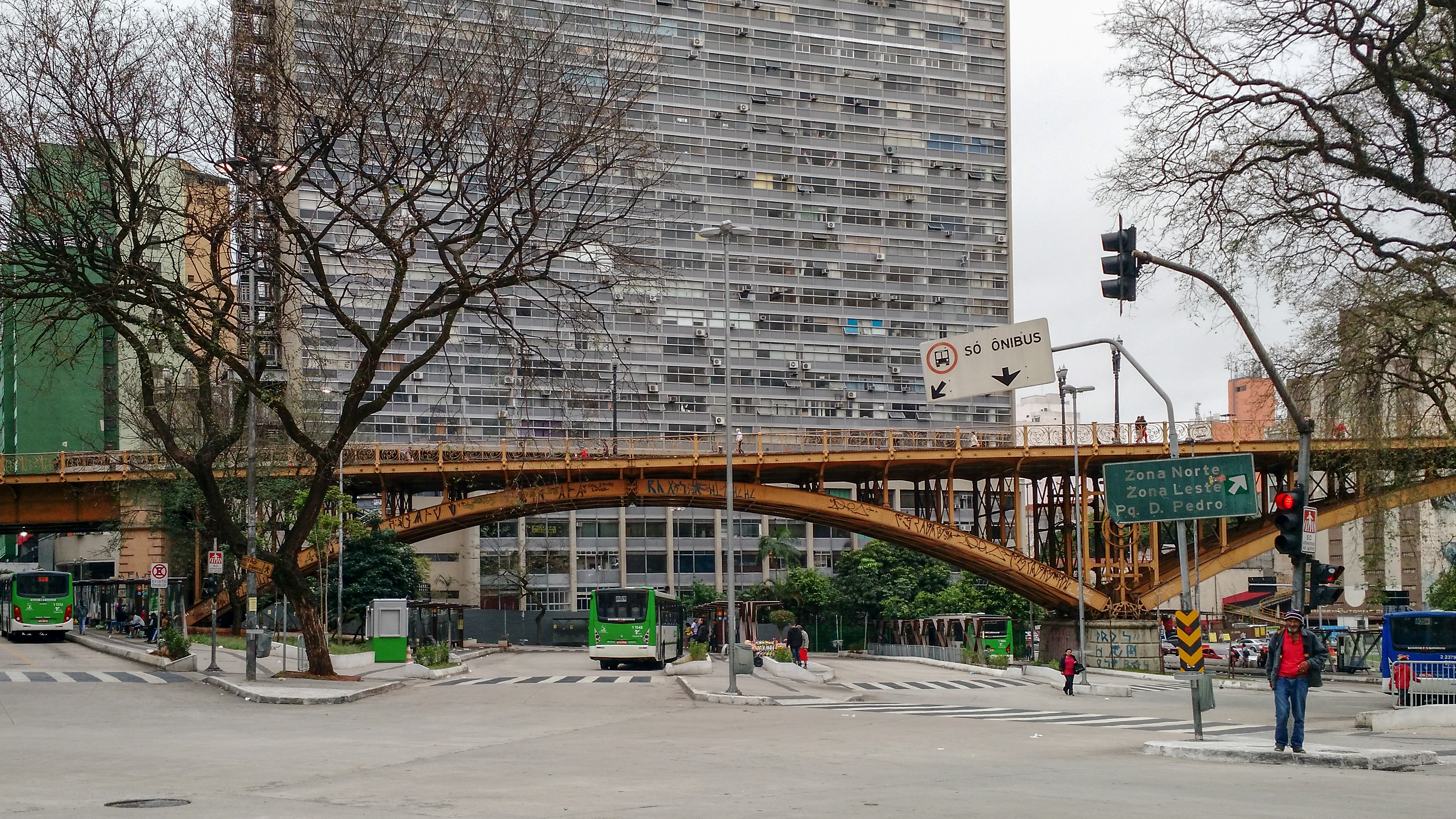
Viaduct seen from the Anhangabaú Valley.

== See also ==
- Tourism in the city of São Paulo
- Central Zone of São Paulo
