= Antônio da Silva Prado =

Brazilian politician (1840–1929)

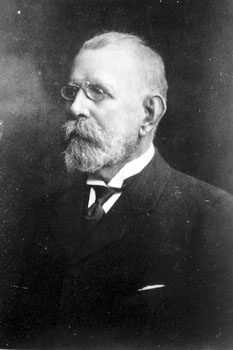

Mayor of São Paulo
- Succeeded by: Raimundo da Silva Duprat

Minister of Foreign Affairs of Brazil
- In office March 10, 1888 – June 27, 1888
- Preceded by: João Maurício Wanderley
- Succeeded by: Rodrigo Augusto da Silva

Antônio da Silva Prado, or Conselheiro Antônio Prado (25 February 1840 — 23 April 1929) was a Brazilian lawyer, farmer, politician and businessesman. He was involved in the drafting of the Saraiva-Cotegipe Law and of the Golden Law.

== Mayor of São Paulo ==
During the republic, he was a member of the Paulista Republican Party. He took office as Mayor of Sao Paulo on 7 January 1899, being the first governor of the municipality to receive the title of "Mayor". (In portugués: "prefeito"). His mandate lasted until 15 January 1911, the longest duration a Mayor of São Paulo has held the office.

He sought to modernize the city's through the construction of bridges and the filling of flood plains, which during rainy seasons, prevented the communication between various zones of the city. In 1900, during his mandate, he began the implementation of electric energy in the city thanks to a hydroelectric power plant built in Santana de Parnaíba by the Canadian Company The Sao Paulo Light and Power, occupying the site of the current shopping center of the same name.With the installation of electric power, the company began to operate electric trams in the city, which replaced animal powered trams.

After leaving the prefecture, he left politics and only returned to it to found, in 1926, the Democratic Party, lending his political prestige to the new party.
