= Basilica of the Most Blessed Sacrament, São Paulo =

Coordinates: 23.5411°S 46.6367°W

Basilica of the Most Blessed Sacrament
- Basílica do Santíssimo Sacramento
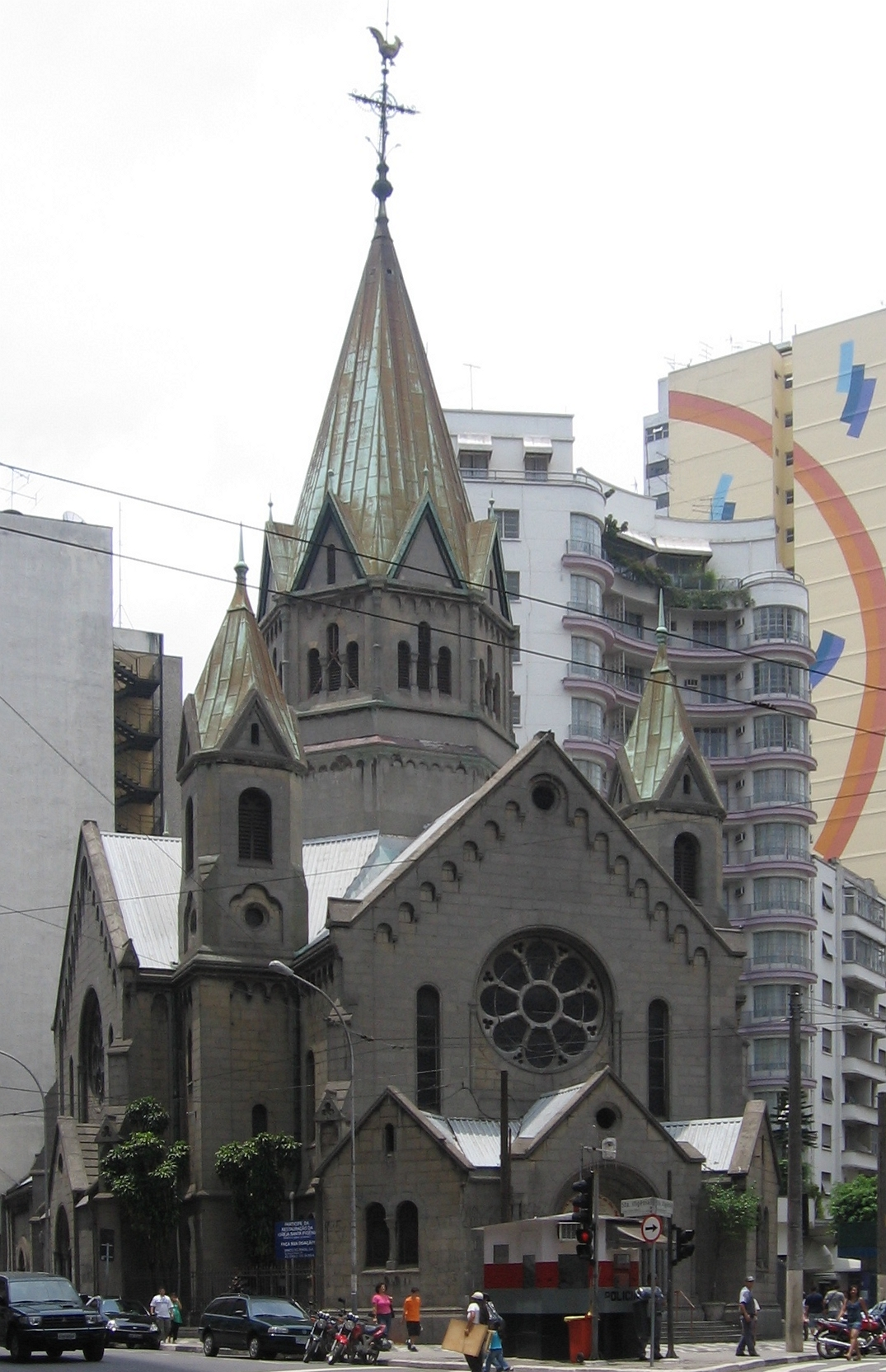
- Basilica of the Most Blessed Sacrament
- Location: São Paulo
- Country: Brazil
- Denomination: Roman Catholic Church

The Basilica of the Most Blessed Sacrament (also Church of St. Efigenia; Portuguese: Basílica do Santíssimo Sacramento) is a Catholic basilica located at the corner of Casper Libero Avenue and Santa Ifigenia Street, in the district of the same name in the city of Sao Paulo in the south of Brazil. The Santa Ifigenia viaduct ends in front of the church.

== Description ==
Located near the Anhangabaú Valley, the current Church of Santa Ifigenia was built on the site of one of the oldest chapels of the city, the Chapel of Our Lady of Conception, built before 1720. This first chapel was renovated in 1794, and by disposition of the prince regent Don João VI, in 1809 the parish of Our Lady of the Conception and Santa Ifigenia appeared.

Between 1930 and 1954, due to the construction of the cathedral of St. Paul, the church of Santa Ifigenia served as cathedral of the city. On April 18, 1958, the church was elevated to the rank of basilica, under the name of Basilica of the Blessed Sacrament, by Pope Pius XII. It was protected by the Municipal Council of Historic, Cultural and Environmental Preservation of the City of Sao Paulo (CONPRESP) in 1992.

== See also ==
- Roman Catholicism in Brazil
- Blessed Sacrament

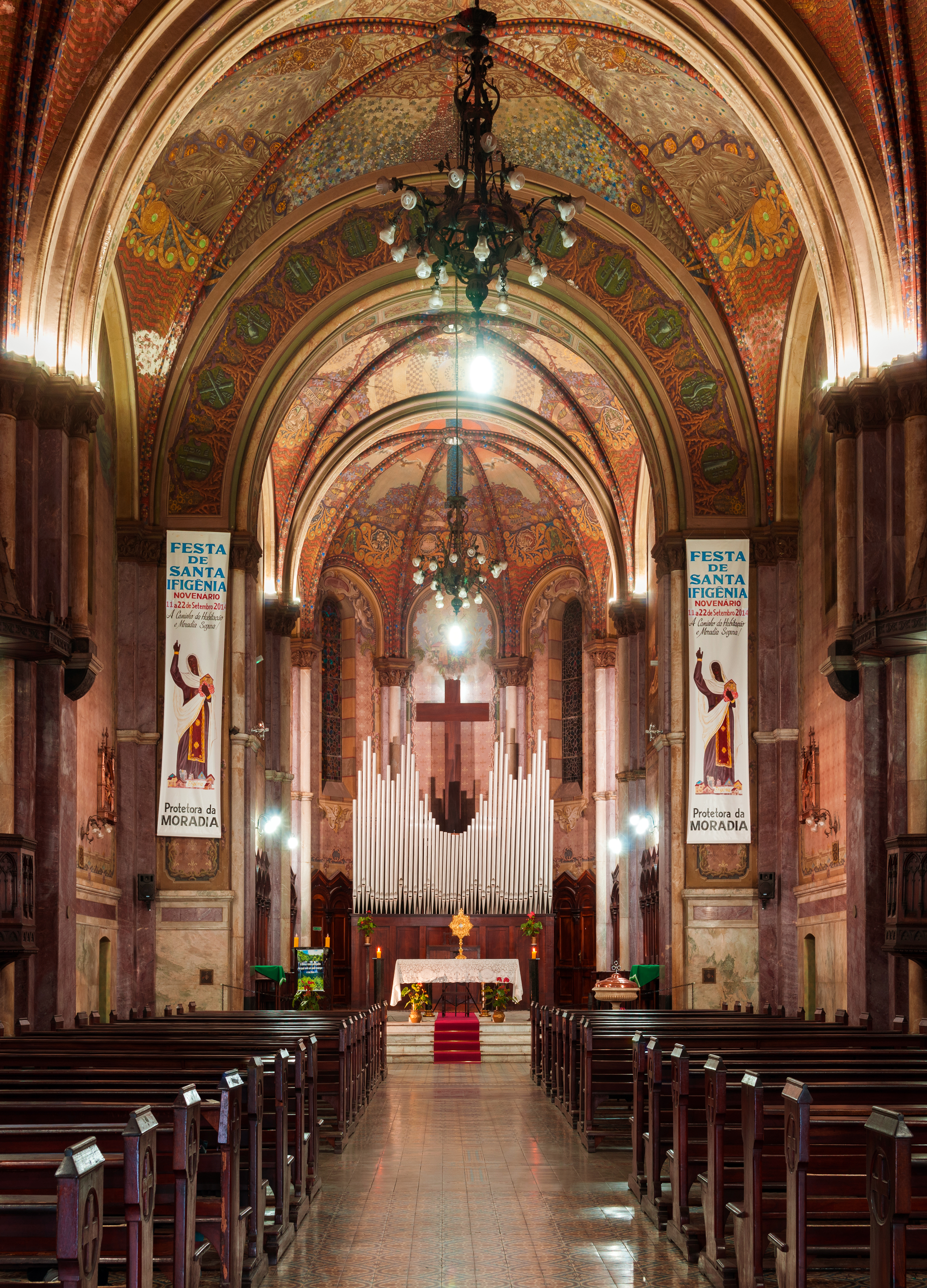
Internal View
