= Raimundo da Silva Duprat =

Brazilian Politician

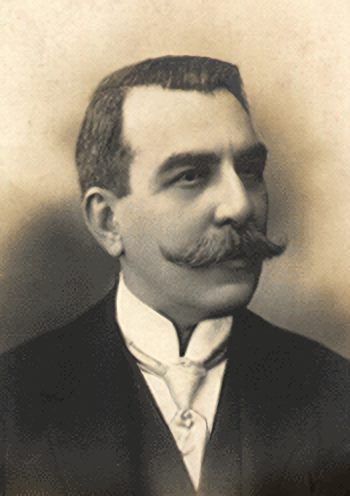

Mayor of São Paulo
- Preceded by: Antônio da Silva Prado
- Succeeded by: Washington Luis

Personal details
- Born: 11 December 1863
- Died: 17 May 1926 (aged 62)

Raymundo da Silva Duprat (11 December 1863 - São Paulo, 17 May 1926) was a Brazilian Politician. He served as a São Paulo city councillor and as acting Mayor of São Paulo under Antônio da Silva Prado's administration. He was also president of the São Paulo city Council.

A descendant of French immigrants, he was the nephew of commander Luís Armand Duprat and the nephew of Visount Carlos Eduardo Duprat. He lived in Recife, Río de Janeiro and in Santos. He moved to São Paulo at the beginning of his adulthood and in addition to his public performances, worked as an accountant, administrator and merchant and owned a printing press. He earned the title of "Baron of Duprat".

He was elected as councilor and later Mayor of São Paulo. His mandate as mayor was marked by an acccelaration of modernization and urbanization in the city of São Paulo. The works that were most important out of his mandate were the construction of the Parque Trianon, the Santa Ifigenia Viaduct, and the urbanization of the Anhagabau Valley.
