= Largo da Memória =

Historic square in São Paulo, Brazil

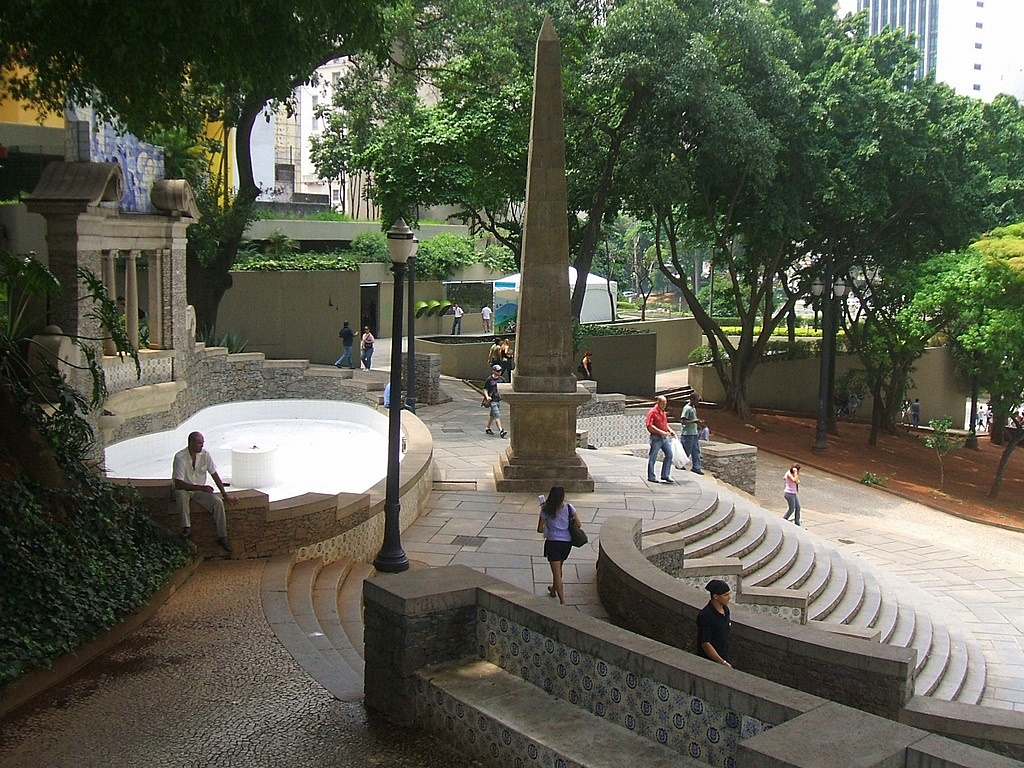
- View of the square.

- Location within São Paulo
- Former names: Largo do Piques

General information
- Type: Square
- Architectural style: Neocolonial style
- Classification: State heritage (CONDEPHAAT/CONPRESP)
- Location: 7 de Abril Street, São Paulo, Brazil
- Coordinates: 23°32′52″S 46°38′22″W

Design and construction
- Engineer: Daniel Pedro Müller
- Other designers: Vicente Gomes Pereira (master mason)

Largo da Memória (Memory Square), formerly known as Largo dos Piques, is a historic square located in the center of the city of São Paulo, Brazil, at the beginning of 7 de Abril Street (formerly Palha Street). Representative of the urbanization of State of São Paulo, it is triangular, delimited by the streets Coronel Xavier de Toledo (formerly known as Paredão Street) and Quirino de Andrade (formerly Ladeira do Piques Street) and Ladeira da Memória Street, which gave origin to the name of the square, near Anhangabaú Valley, currently part of Bandeira Square. Built at the end of the colonial period, the square hosts the first, and therefore oldest, monument in São Paulo, the Piques Obelisk (Piques Pyramid), inaugurated in 1814.

The site has gone through several changes, including a name change. Physical changes include the addition of walls, staircases and a portico. In 1945, Henrique Manzo, using as reference the photograph "Paredão de Piques, Ladeiras da Consolação e da Rua da Palha, 1862", published in Militão Augusto de Azevedo's "Álbum Comparativo da Cidade de São Paulo" (Comparative Album of the City of São Paulo), created the work of the genre historical painting named "Piques, 1860", commissioned by the director of the Paulista Museum, at the time Afonso d'Escragnolle Taunay.

== History ==
The square was built on the place formerly known as "Piques", a triangular-shaped ravine that served as an entrance and exit of the city of São Paulo for the muleteers who transported goods. At the time the square was built, animals were used to transport cargo and goods, and their owners used to stop to fill their water containers in the water fountain there and for their animals to refresh themselves after long journeys; alsom, it was a meeting place for the residents.

In the square, there was also a slave market. The owners of blacks or mulattos, when they wanted to sell them, would take them to the Largo do Piques (Largo da Memória), where, on Saturdays, there were auctions and buying and selling of enslaved people. Anyone who wanted to sell or buy slaves would go to the Largo do Piques black market.

In 1814, the provisional government of the Captaincy of São Paulo constituted by Bishop D. Mateus de Abreu, Ombudsman D. Nuno Eugênio de Lossio, and Squadron Chief Miguel José de Oliveira Pinto, a triumvirate that ruled between 1813 and 1814, commissioned military engineer Daniel Pedro Müller to build the Piques Road, which would facilitate communication between São Paulo and the inland cities, a retaining wall, and a new fountain (in the shape of a small squat house). The estate, which became known as Largo da Memória, was located on the border with the "New City", which was on the opposite side of Anhangabaú River.

Starting with the widening of the Pique and Palha slopes, Müller built the square and the fountain, and with the leftover material from another work he asked master mason Vicente Gomes Pereira (Mestre Vicentinho) to build the obelisk "in memory of the zeal for public good" demonstrated by the government. The obelisk was made of ashlar and was located inside a masonry basin with iron bars. The work was to celebrate the end of one of Bishop Dom Mateus' interim governments or the end of a drought that had punished the region that year. The Piques Pyramid is considered São Paulo's first monument or, as Roberto Pompeu de Toledo defined it in his book "A Capital da Solidão", the "first useless work", whose "function did not concern any practical aspect of life." "The pyramid was a sign that São Paulo was ceasing to have the function of a mere outpost for the conversion of the indigenous people" the author wrote.

During the 19th century, it was one of the "entrance doors" to the city, as it was located at the meeting point between the routes to Sorocaba, Pinheiros, Anastácio and Água Fria, and an important meeting point for provincial residents, travelers and slaves, attracted by the drinking water provided by the fountain of the square. The water was collected at the Reúno Tank, near the location of today's Bandeira Square, passed through Piques and continued until it reached the central lake of the Public Garden, now Luz Park. However, according to the extinct newspaper Correio Paulistano, in 1872 the place was supplied by Bixiga Tank, which exists to this day on 13 de Maio Street.

At the end of that century it gained a fig tree, Ficus cestrifolia Miquel, also called "Figueira-Brava" or "Figueira Piques" in Brazil, which in 1986 was considered "the best known tree in São Paulo". However its historical and environmental importance, as a centennial tree with the title of main and largest tree, which provided shade and comfort to the surrounding residents and travelers passing by, did not prevent it from being threatened to be cut down. Later, however, this intention was revoked. This risk of toppling was due to the new project elaborated for the square: in 1919, Washington Luís, on the occasion of the celebrations of the centenary of Brazil's independence, hired Victor Dubugras and José Wasth Rodrigues to design the reform of the square that would give it its current features.

With a neocolonial style, the project enhanced the obelisk, introduced a new fountain (in a tank also called "vasca"), a portico with tiles, staircases and circular benches also called exedras. In 1922, the Ladeira da Memória Street became the first public place where the city coat of arms of São Paulo appeared. The tiles of the work with the city coat of arms (chosen in a public contest won by Guilherme de Almeida and Wasth Rodrigues in 1917) were produced in England and painted and re-baked in Brazil in the first Brazilian factory to produce fine faience, a type of ceramic used in dishes such as cups, plates, and others. Located in Santa Catarina, the factory was owned by Ranzini, an Italian ceramist. The representations on the tile confirm what the square is: Memoria (Memory). The square was protected by the municipality in the early 1970s (Z8-200-083). Moreover, the landscaping project kept the fig tree in the same place, with the support of councilman Amaral Gurgel, who exposed, in the Municipal Chamber of São Paulo (Câmara Municipal de São Paulo - CMSP), his concern about the care given to the trees in the place.The fig tree only had some branches cut off during the construction of the Anhangabaú Station, in the 1970s, a few meters below. The construction of the accesses to the subway station and the installation of the bus terminal at Bandeira Square, in the late 1960s, significantly altered the surroundings of the square.

Throughout the 19th century, complaints about the functioning of the fountain were common, especially in relation to the pipes, which were precarious and targets of constant maintenance. Even so, it served the São Paulo population and travelers with their animals for decades, until, in 1872, the fountain was removed from Largo da Memória. At that time, the railroad's role as the "gateway" to the city was transferred to the Luz Station; the old troops gradually lost their importance, until they were completely replaced by the train. The fact was due to the railroad system changing the city's transportation axis: transportation with donkeys and horses gradually decreased, as trains became the main transportation actors, both from the interior and from the coast. Without the fountain, the Largo da Memória lost much of its relevance.

Due to the cultural, historical and architectural importance of this place in the formation of the city, Largo da Memória was declared a state heritage site in 1975 by the Council for the Defense of Historical, Archaeological, Artistic and Tourist Heritage (Conselho de Defesa do Patrimônio Histórico, Arqueológico, Artístico e Turístico - CONDEPHAAT) and a municipal heritage site in 1991 by Municipal Council for the Preservation of the Historical, Cultural and Environmental Heritage of the City of São Paulo (Conselho Municipal de Preservação do Patrimônio Histórico, Cultural e Ambiental da Cidade de São Paulo - CONPRESP).

=== Name origin ===
Largo da Memória got its name after a while, originating from the name of the slope. The naming as Largo da Memória was done by the CMSP, but it soon became known as Largo do Pique, later changed to Largo do Piques. The interpretation of the origin of the name "piques" is controversial.

According to historian Paulo Cursino de Moura, the name came from the ruggedness of the terrain. The pique was all the slopes around, the whole hillside. Any descent to that center of the valley was a pique. This adverbial locution, "by pique", degenerated in popular slang to simply pique or piques, referring to all the slopes. The confluence of the piques determined the generalization of the name to everything around the square. Some chroniclers even interpret that the name "pique" was given to the place because of the children's game of tag (pique e pega), however Cursino states that the game was a consequence of the existing name of the square.

For the architect Luciana de Barros Maragliano, it could either represent the family name of Lázaro Rodrigues Piques, a blacksmith who lived near the site around 1770, or it could indicate the significant unevenness between the upper street (currently, Xavier de Toledo Street) and the Anhangabaú Valley below; in other words, a pique (steep) slope.

For journalist Roberto Pompeu de Toledo, there are two possibilities: the expression "a pique" (meaning "plumb", "vertically") related to the rugged terrain that formed slopes around the monument; or the relation to a family with the same surname (Pique) who lived there. In the publication "Largo da Memória", by Institute Itaú Cultural, there is yet another hypothesis: the word "pique" would be used in the sense of affronting someone, since the muleteers also settled their feuds at the square.

== Piques Obelisk ==
Piques Obelisk
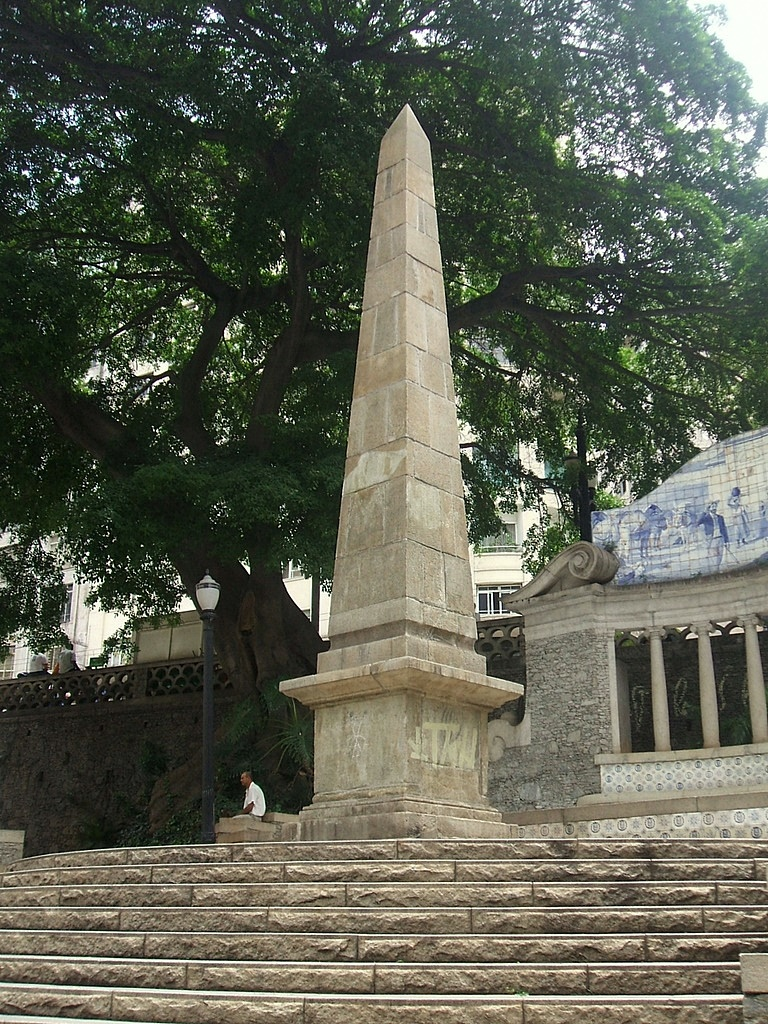
- "Piques Pyramid"

- Location within São Paulo
- Alternative names: Piques Pyramid

General information
- Type: Obelisk
- Classification: State heritage (CONDEPHAAT)
- Location: Largo da Memória, São Paulo, Brazil
- Coordinates: 23°32′52″S 46°38′22″W
- Completed: 1814
- Renovated: 2005

Height
- Height: 5 m

Technical details
- Material: light-gray granite

Design and construction
- Other designers: Vicente Gomes Pereira (master mason)

Renovating team
- Renovating firm: CBA and DPH

The Piques Obelisk, also known as Memória Obelisk, named after the place where it stands, is a monument about five meters high, in Largo da Memória, built in 1814. Originally, this pyramidal landmark demarcated the existence of a fountain built in the same year in the square, the Piques Fountain, so in old references, it also appears as Piques Pyramid, erected by Vicente Gomes Pereira, aka Vicentinho, a Portuguese master builder. People, seeing that this obelisk resembled a spearhead piercing the space, would have started calling it "pique" instead of "obelisk" or "pyramid."

The work was built under the guidance of Marshal Daniel Pedro Müller, a military engineer, and initially stood in the water, which formed a basin there. It was commissioned by the Count of Palma, in honor of Governor Bernardo José de Lorena. The marshal also led the construction of the Piques Fountain and the old Carmo Bridge.

The work carved in light gray granite rock was restored in 2005 by a private company.

=== 2005 restoration ===
On December 13, 2005, the São Paulo City Hall delivered to the city the restoration of the obelisk of Largo da Memória. The works were sponsored by Brazilian Aluminium Company (Companhia Brasileira de Alumínio - CBA), in partnership with the city's Department of Historical Heritage (Departamento do Patrimônio Histórico do Município - DPH), linked to the Municipal Secretariat of Culture.

The original features designed by engineer Daniel Pedro Müller were preserved and restored. CBA, of the Votorantim Group, sponsored the restoration and conservation of the obelisk, and was responsible for conservation in the following two years (2006 and 2007).

According to the São Paulo City Hall, "the restoration project [was] part of a partnership between CBA and DPH, through the program 'Adote uma Obra Artística' (Adopt an Artistic Work), of the Municipal Secretariat of Culture, the Federation of Friends of Museums of Brazil (Federação de Amigos de Museus do Brasil - Fambra) and Ação Local - Ladeira da Memória, which [sought] the support of private initiative for the conservation and physical restoration of works of art and monuments in São Paulo."

Due to the lack of care for the area, the place is considered very dangerous and is abandoned, even though it is one of the most important tourist attractions in São Paulo. Currently, the area serves as a shelter for several homeless people. The smell of urine and filth are constant in this area.

=== 2014 bicentennial ===
On October 18, 2014, the obelisk of Largo da Memória completed two hundred years of history. The date was celebrated with an event organized by the Municipal Secretariat of Culture of São Paulo, which included 56 presentations of dance, theater, music, circus, living statues, and urban intervention created by two hundred artists. The program began on October 13 and lasted until November 2. Mustache e os Apaches, Cabaré Três Vinténs, Chaiss na Mala, O Bardo e o Banjo, and Emblues Beer Band were some of the band attractions of the event.

The bicentennial was also marked by a project to clean and chemically protect the monument, through a service donation agreement with the companies NanoBr, Evonik, Rental Master and Inova. The project to restore the architectural ensemble and reactivate the monument's fountain was prepared by the Gesto Architecture Office and included as a priority in the "Adote uma Obra Artística" program, of the Department of Historical Heritage of the City of São Paulo. The project was also designed to restore the monument's fountain.

According to the director of the Department of Historical Heritage, Nádia Somekh, the restoration of the work done in 2005 was lost due to lack of conservation.

== See also ==
- Militão Augusto de Azevedo
- Afonso d'Escragnolle Taunay
- Victor Dubugras
- Guilherme de Almeida
- Luz Station
- Anhangabaú Station
- Largo da Batata
- Obelisk of São Paulo

== Bibliography ==
- Bruno, Ernani Silva (1954). História e tradições da cidade de São Paulo (in Portuguese). Vol. 3. São Paulo: José Olympio.
- Matsuy, Karen (2012). Painel de azulejos do Largo da Memória (in Portuguese) (Graduation thesis). USP.
- Rolnik, Raquel (1997). A cidade e a lei: legislação, política urbana e territórios na cidade de São Paulo (in Portuguese). São Paulo: FAPESP - Studio Nobel.
- Toledo, Roberto Pompeu de (2003). A Capital da Solidão. Uma história de São Paulo das origens a 1900 (in Portuguese). Rio de Janeiro: Objetiva. ISBN 85-7302-568-9
