= José Wasth Rodrigues =

Brazilian artist, teacher and historian (1891–1957)

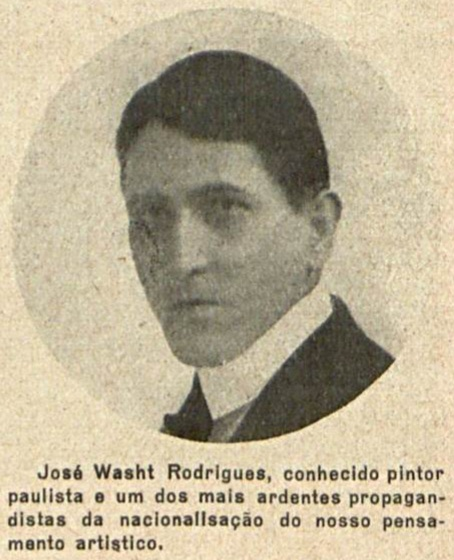
- Born: 19 March 1891; São Paulo, Brazil
- Died: 21 April 1957 (aged 66); Rio de Janeiro, Brazil
- Education: Académie Julian École des Beaux-Arts
- Occupations: Historian, painter, designer, illustrator, ceramist, teacher
- Notable work: Coat of arms of São Paulo

José Wasth Rodrigues (19 March 1891 – 21 April 1957) was a Brazilian painter, drafter, illustrator, ceramist, teacher and historian. He was the uncle of the also illustrator Ivan Wasth Rodrigues.

Wasth Rodrigues was an important figure for the history of the city of São Paulo, being responsible for the development of several Brazilian municipalities' coats of arms, such as that of the City of São Paulo, of Mogi das Cruzes and of São Sebastião. Later, he would also design the coat of arms of the State of São Paulo. He also stands out for his work as a historian, leaving several publications focused on architectural documentation of civil and religious construction and works on antique furniture, clothing, insignias and military weapons.

José Wasth Rodrigues was a pioneer in showing concern about the demolitions and decharacterization suffered by examples of Brazil's cultural heritage, suggesting, in an inquiry for the newspaper "O Estado de São Paulo" about Colonial Architecture, that "the foundation of a Society or Commission of Architects with full powers with the governments and the Curias to embargo demolitions and prevent restorations from being made with the sacrifice of the building's 'characteristic physiognomy'".

== Biography ==
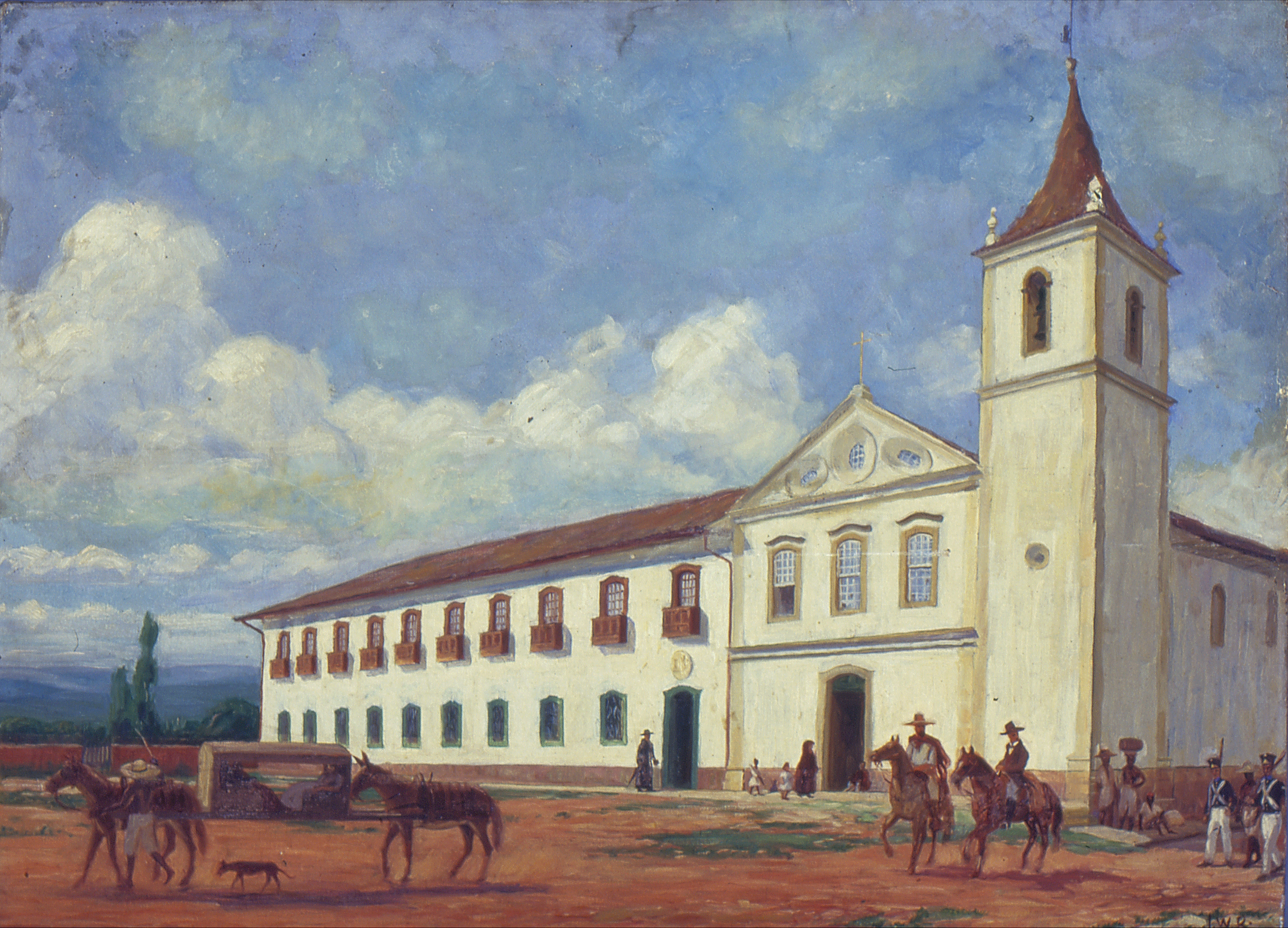
"Largo e Mosteiro de São Bento" (São Bento Square and Monastery).

José Wasth Rodrigues, born in São Paulo, studied for two years with Oscar Pereira da Silva. Not only a painter, he was also a historian and an expert in furniture, armory, and heraldry. He stood out, still young, in the production of plastic arts. In 1910, after his studies from 1908 to 1909, he received a trip to Europe from the government of the State of São Paulo.

In Paris, France, he attended the Académie Julian and the École des Beaux-Arts, having as masters Jean Paul Laurens, Nandi and Lucien Simon. In 1914, he exhibited at the Paris Salon, and before the outbreak of World War I, he returned to Brazil. Two years later (1916) he founded a drawing and painting course in São Paulo.

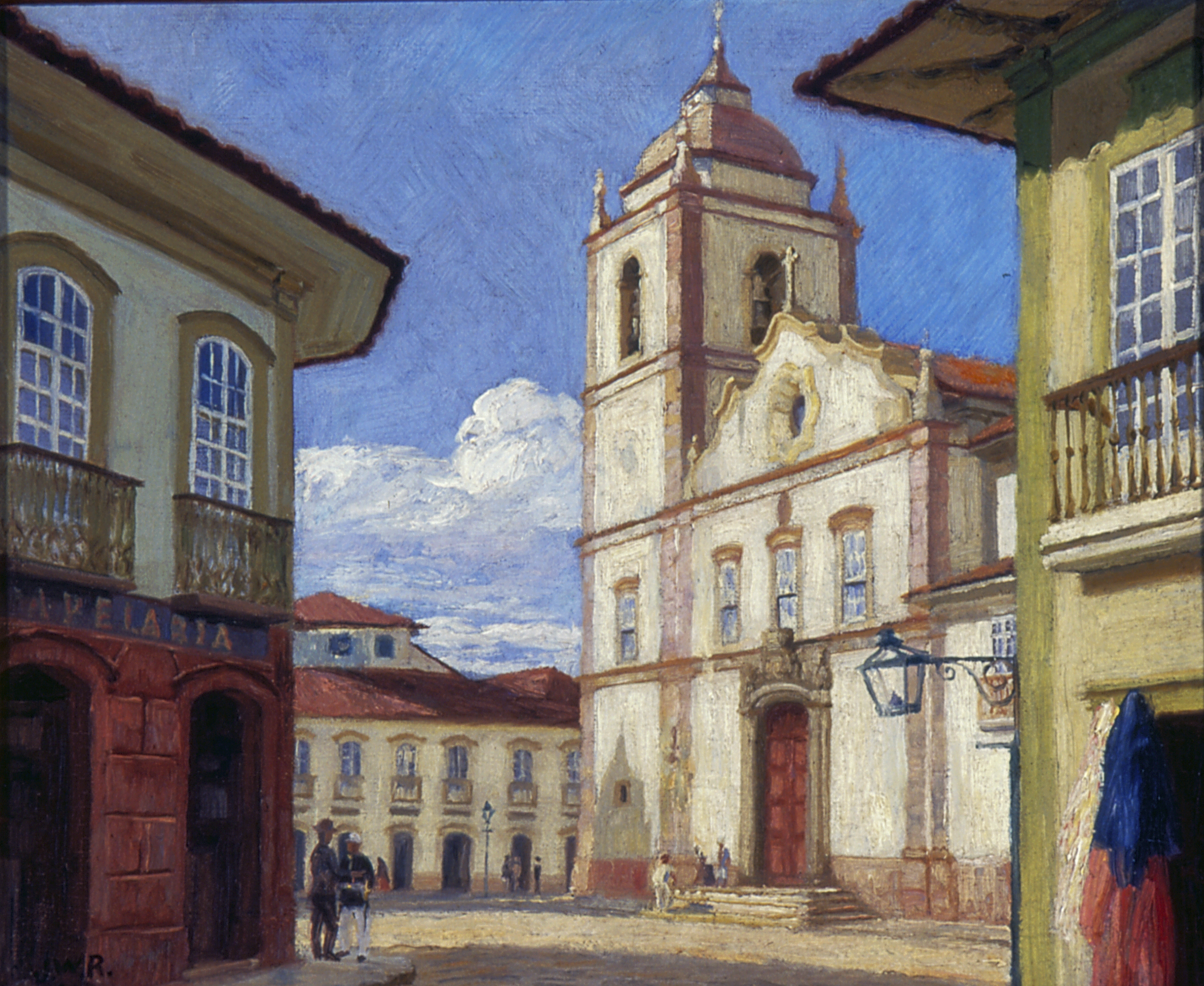
"Páteo da Sé" (Courtyard of the cathedral).

He returned to São Paulo in 1914, taking an active part in the city's artistic life. In 1916, together with George Fischer Elpons and William Zadig, he opens a painting and drawing course. Wasth Rodrigues creates many coats of arms, such as that of the city of São Paulo, in 1917, with the help of the poet Guilherme de Almeida (1890–1969), and also that of the State of São Paulo, in 1932.

He received his first gold medal at the Paulista Salon in 1933, and his first prize for painting in 1934. During his trips to Minas Gerais, Bahia, Pernambuco and Rio de Janeiro, he registered in oils, watercolors and drawings, mainly pen-and-ink, old manor houses, churches and monuments of the region. He gave important collaboration to the Department of National Historical and Artistic Heritage, participating in the advisory board and executing historical artistic works.

When recently arrived from a European season, Wasth Rodrigues, besides rendering services to Ricardo Severo's studies, also dedicated himself to illustrate Monteiro Lobato's books and articles from "Revista do Brasil". In his first phase (between 1916 and 1925), Wasth Rodrigues counted on the collaboration of the most important part of Brazilian intellectuality, for the defense and diffusion of nationalism, conquering a privileged space by the editorial quality and by the willingness to break with the superficiality that characterized the magazines born under the sign of the turn of the century. Born of articulations promoted by the owners of "O Estado de S. Paulo", the "Revista do Brasil", although of national repercussion, bore the mark of the São Paulo elites in its board of directors, formed by Júlio de Mesquita, Alfredo Pujol, and Luís Pereira Barreto; and, especially, in the list of 66 members of the anonymous society (presided over by Ricardo Severo) that made the project financially viable.

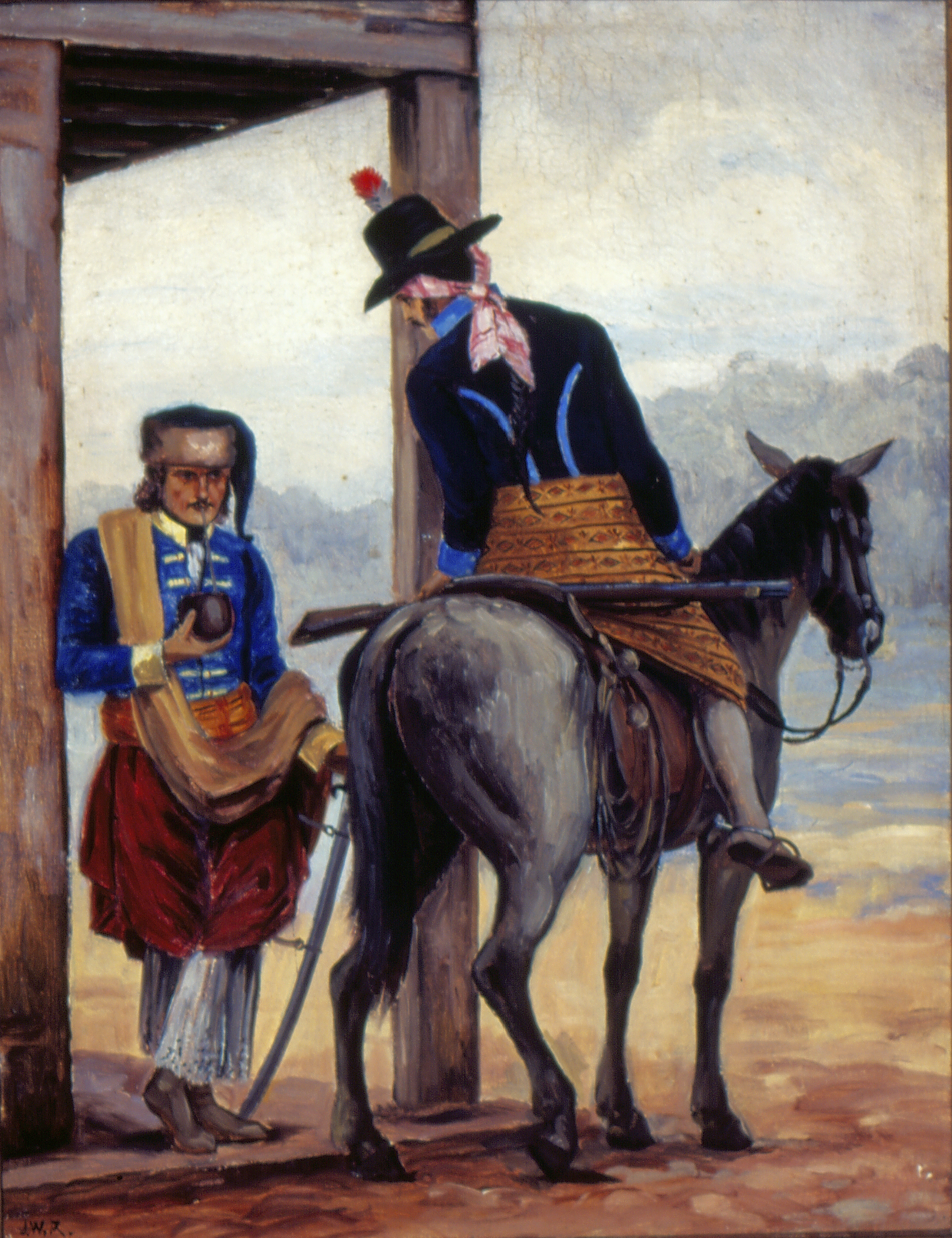
"Soldado da Legião Paulista na Cisplatina e Gaúcho" (Soldier of the Paulista Legion in the Cisplatina and Gaucho).

The question about the "national" was the order of the day, manifesting itself in all sectors of the country's intellectual life, and particularly in São Paulo. The European war had mortally wounded the spirit of the Belle Époque and, although reactions were not limited to the nativist search for Brazilian roots, for some time "modernity" and "nationalism" were almost synonymous. The Paulista strand of this movement manifested itself in interest in historical and folkloric themes from the past: bandeirantes, caipiras, genealogy, travelers' accounts.

Around 1918, Wasth Rodrigues began to dedicate himself to the study of colonial history, and became one of the pioneers in recording the artistic activities of the period. José Wasth Rodrigues was a pioneer in showing concern about the demolitions and decharacterization suffered by examples of the Brazilian cultural heritage. He suggested, then, in an inquiry for the newspaper "O Estado de S. Paulo" on Colonial Architecture, that "the foundation of a Society or Commission of Architects with full powers with the governments and the Curias to embargo demolitions and prevent restorations from being made with the sacrifice of the building's 'characteristic physiognomy'."

This interest in the architecture of the past, which extends to advocating preservation, is unusual in the period, and was not expressed even by Ricardo Severo, who never expressed any concern about it. Another important protagonist of the period who also seems to have been strongly impressed by Severo's ideas is Mário de Andrade, whose first articles on architecture – the series of articles under the title "A Arte religiosa no Brasil" (Religious Art in Brazil), published in 1920 in "Revista do Brasil" – as well as the travels he undertook to write them, seem clearly motivated by them. Like Wasth Rodrigues, Mário is certainly among the first artists and intellectuals of the period to get to know old Brazilian cities in loco. An excellent draftsman, he became famous for his works in quill pen, in which he addressed the urban landscape and detailed Brazilian colonial architecture and furniture.

José Wasth Rodrigues was responsible for reintroducing the tradition of tile painting in São Paulo's public artworks. He executed decorative panels for the four monuments of the Lorena Sidewalk and the old Santos road. In the capital of São Paulo, he decorated in tiles the Memory Square. As a painter, he stood out for his historical works, distinguished by the capriciousness in portraying the details of the events portrayed.

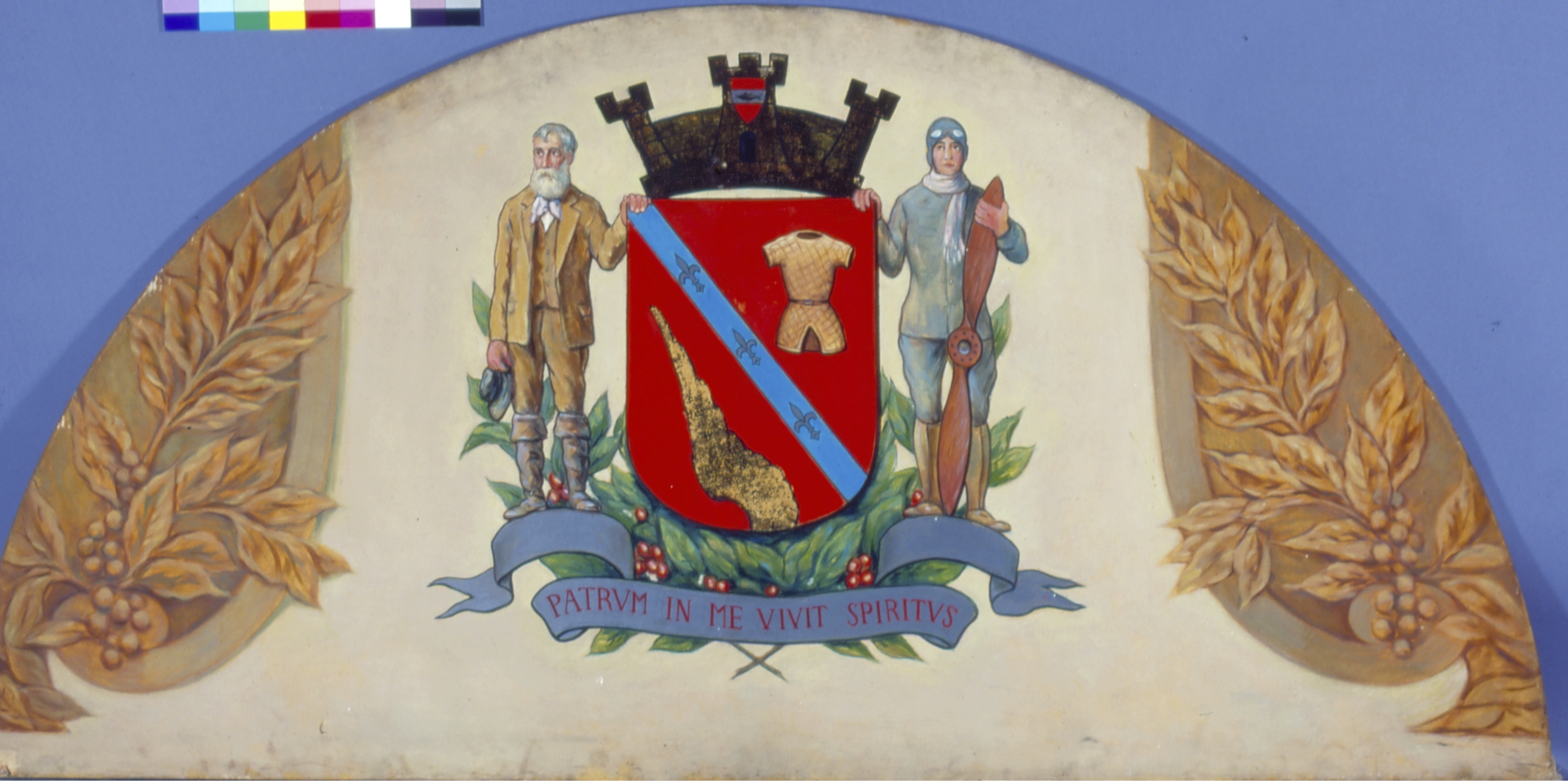
"Brasão com Armas de Jaú" (Coat of Arms of Jaú).

In 1932, he joined the Pro Modern Art Society. He illustrated, in a very realistic style, several books: "Urupês", by Monteiro Lobato; "Uniformes do Exército Brasileiro" (Brazilian Army Uniforms), by Gustavo Barroso; "Brasões e Bandeiras do Brasil" (Coats of Arms and Flags of Brazil), by Clóvis Ribeiro; "Vida e Morte do Bandeirante" (Life and Death of the Bandeirante), by Alcântara Machado, etc.. Between 1935 and 1936, he conceived the project to restore items from the Our Lady of the Rosary Church, in Ouro Preto.

At the opening of the XVIII Annual Salon of ENBA, on 12 August 1921, the ten competing projects were exhibited, and, after lengthy deliberation, the judging commission of the IBA announced the winners. The first prize was conceived to Nereu de Sampaio and Gabriel Fernandes, but José Wasth Rodrigues, who was venturing into architecture, was considered a strong competitor. The Neocolonial style arrived in Rio de Janeiro as a challenge to academic conservatism: the ENBA represented to architecture and the fine arts what the Brazilian Academy of Letters represented to literature. Through the seduction exerted by the competitions promoted by José Marianno and by the ideas propagandized by Ricardo Severo, the newly graduated students and professionals developed in the following years hundreds of projects in the neocolonial style, and José Wasth Rodrigues stood out.

== Work ==
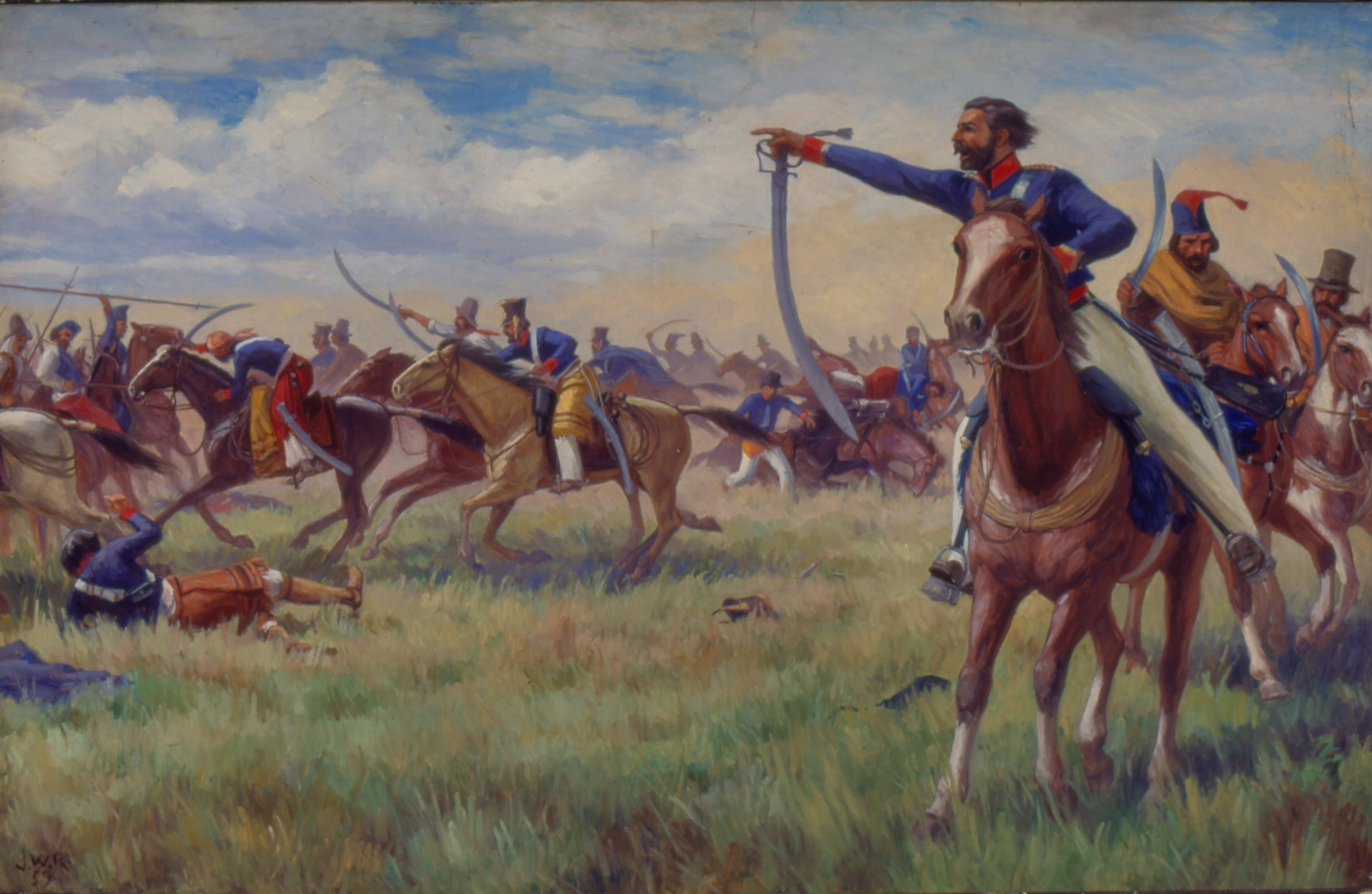
"Batalha de Ituzaingó" (Battle of Ituzaingó).

José Wasth Rodrigues published the following works: "Documentário arquitetônico relativo à antiga construção civil no Brasil" (Architectural documentary on old construction in Brazil), in eight volumes, extensively illustrated; "Móveis antigos de Minas Gerais" (Antique furniture from Minas Gerais); "A casa da moradia do Brasil antigo" (The house of habitation in ancient Brazil). He also produced drawings and watercolors for the book "Uniformes do Exército Brazileiro".

In 1895 Wasth Rodrigues already participated in exhibitions at Casa Garraux and, in 1901, he exhibited Rinha de Galos" and, in 1908, the sketch of the historical painting "A Convenção de Itu, 1873" (The Itu Convention, 1873), whose oil painting belongs to the collection of this Museum and is exhibited at the Republican Museum "Convenção de Itu", in the city of Itu (SP). In the same year, 1908, he received a gold medal in the exhibition at the National School of Fine Arts (ENBA). In 1902, he held an individual exhibition with thirty authorial works, at Castelões Gallery. He was invited by Affonso de Taunay to execute conventional portraits of Itu and views of the city of São Paulo. His works dealt with landscape, genre painting, customs and portraits. Due to his death, he had his works exhibited at the headquarters of the Association of Public Employees of the State of São Paulo, at São Bento Street.

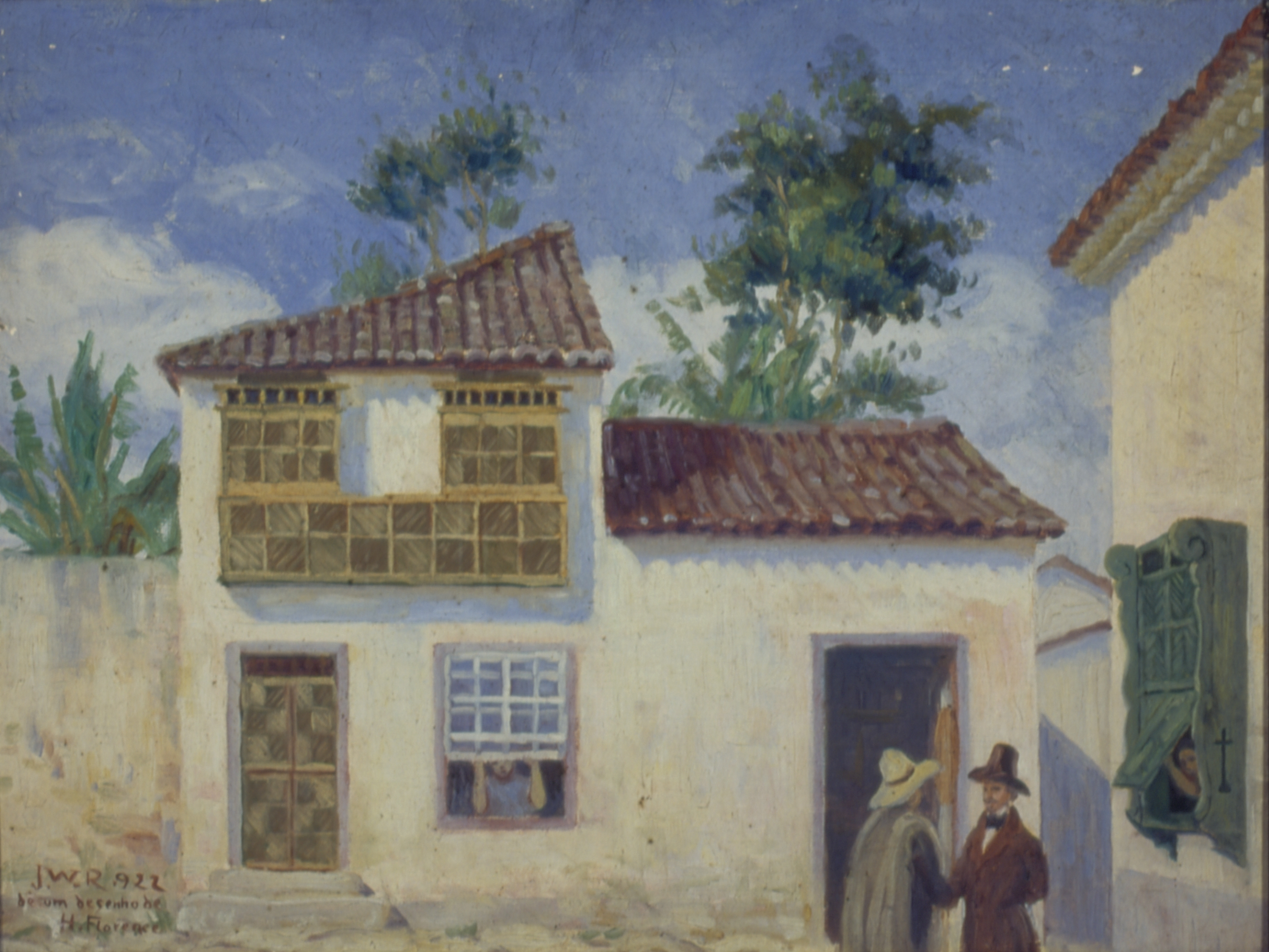
"Casas Velhas de Santos" (Old Houses of Santos).

Following Severo's way, Wasth Rodrigues made numerous trips throughout Brazil since 1918, gathering documentation that would become the book "Documentário Arquitetônico" (Architectural Documentary), originally published in fascicles in the 1940s. Severo financed numerous excursions for Wasth Rodrigues, with the aim of researching the vestiges of colonial art and architecture. He commissioned the registration, in pen-and-ink drawings, photographs and watercolors, of constructive and ornamental details that could also constitute themselves as didactic material, intended to standardize the manifestations of architects who intended to follow his call in favor of what he called "traditional art."

In the Severo's manner, the documentation collected by Wasth Rodrigues reproduces constructive and decorative elements in isolation, even though some important buildings were surveyed in plan and elevation. The material clearly shows the intention for which it was collected, and it is explicit in Wasth Rodrigues' introduction: a kind of "book of models" to inspire the neocolonial production of those years. Nevertheless, due to its late publication, the work ended up not fulfilling such a role – that seems to have been left to the album "Estilo colonial brasileiro: composições arquitetônicas de motivos originais", of 1927, conceived by the Italian designer Felisberto Ranzini.

Such an approach to traditional Brazilian architecture may have encouraged the removal of constructive or ornamental elements from old buildings, contributing to their decharacterization and stimulating the predatory trade in antiques. This is what can be understood from the terms used by congressman José Wanderley de Araújo Pinho in his federal bill presented in 1930 and concerning "all immovable or movable things to which the state should extend its protection, due to its artistic value, its historical significance or its peculiar and remarkable beauty." In this legal piece, Pinho explicitly refers to the protection of constructive elements such as:

the copings, friezes, architraves, doors, windows, columns, tiles, ceilings, carpentry work, wall paintings, and any ornaments that may be removed from one building to another and that, when removed, mutilate or denature the style of the property or its unity, whatever the material of which they are made, and even when such mutilation does not apparently harm the artistic or historical merit of the property to which they were attached...

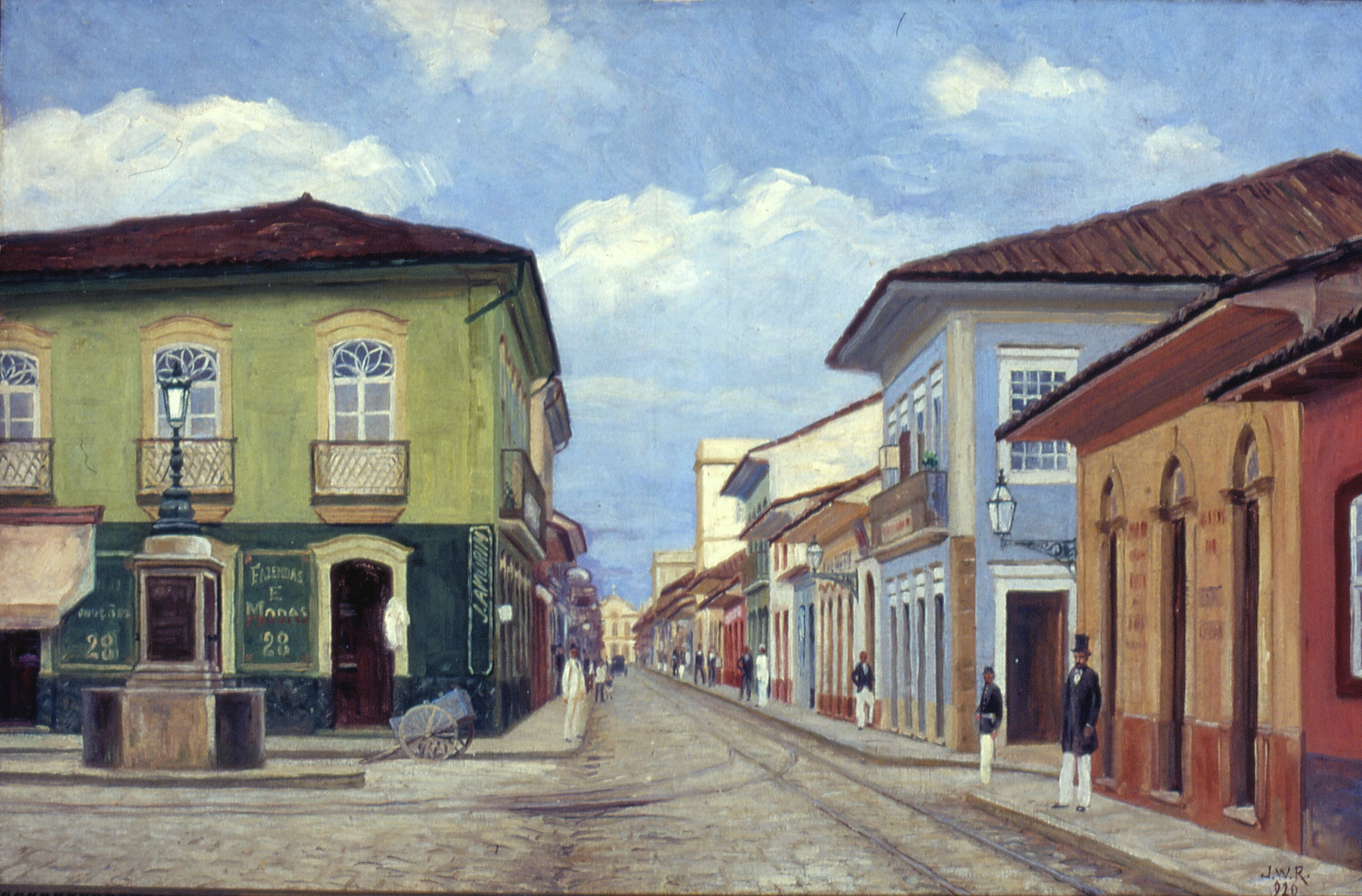
"Largo do Rosário" (Rosário Square).

Wanderley Pinho's project, which presents unquestionable advances over previous initiatives, is the first to manifest awareness that cultural property is an inseparable whole, and that the collectionism of pieces originating from old buildings – accessory or constitutive – could stimulate the dilapidation of patrimonies.

=== Technique ===
Paintings that were almost a portrait of historical scenes marked José Wasth Rodrigues' work, but his production is diverse: oil paintings, tiles, watercolors, pencil and quill pen drawings can be observed throughout his trajectory. (Note: of a certain image of the city, devoid of social contradictions, salubrious and orderly. Historical paintings marked José Wasth Rodrigues' work, but his iconographic production is diverse: oil paintings, tiles, watercolors, pencil and pen-and-ink drawings can be observed throughout his career.)

Wasth Rodrigues' technique for producing the decorated tiles, which were a highlight for the artist, is that of over-glaze, which involves working directly on the already glazed surface, with a brush, or using successive masks for each tone or color. The tile thus worked was then taken to the kiln, to be fired at a temperature of 850 °C."

=== Influences ===
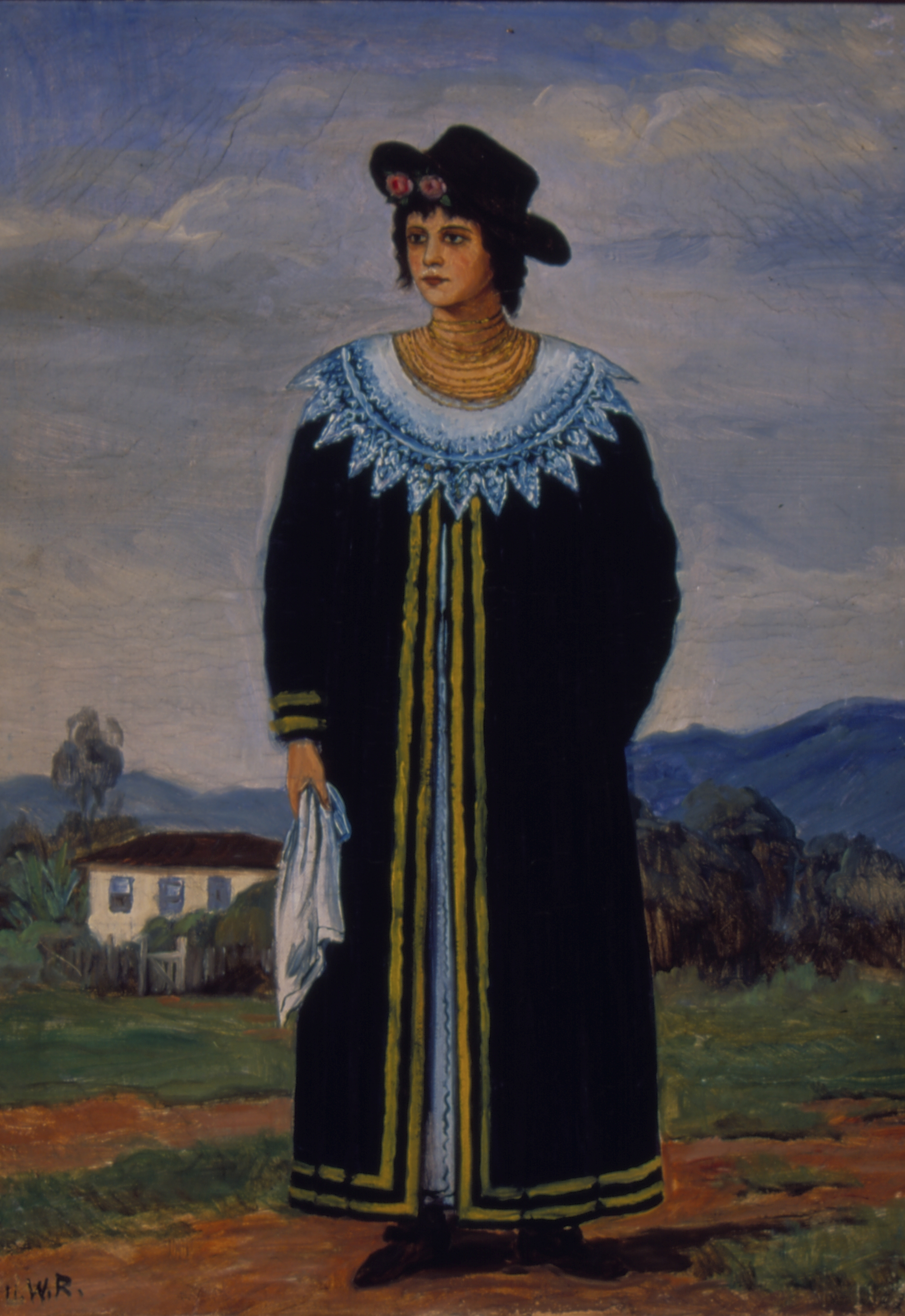
"Dama Paulista" (Paulista Lady).

The documental bases that subsidized the artistic production of Wasth Rodrigues are diverse: the oldest photographic views of the city of São Paulo, from which we highlight the ones by Militão Augusto de Azevedo, and the drawings and engravings of the artists who integrated the scientific expeditions traveling through Brazil during the first half of the 19th century, as well as his trips to study the colonial architecture in the interior of the country, the researches on the uniforms of the Brazilian army, the flags, heraldry and about the Brazilian and Portuguese colonial furniture. José Wasth Rodrigues' interest in Brazilian colonial architecture was motivated after his return from Paris. Influenced by Ricardo Severo, Wasth Rodrigues dedicated himself to the survey of information in the interior and other states, about buildings still remaining of our colonial architecture, an element valued by the Brazilian Neocolonial style of which Ricardo Severo was one of the idealizers.

It was under the care and guidance of Ricardo Severo and José Marianno Filho that Wasth Rodrigues' first consistent work was promoted, which consisted of an in loco survey of architecture. Thus, he increases substantively his knowledge on the subject, and had the production of the important "Documentário Arquitetônico" (Architectural Documentary), sponsored by Severo and carried out in the late 10s, published in the 1940s.

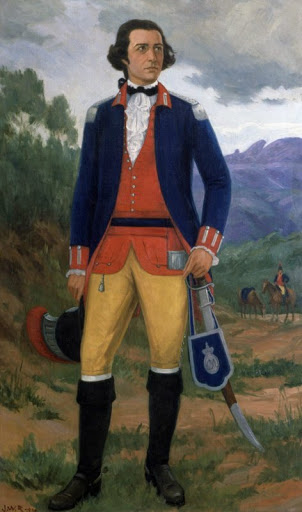
Joaquim José da Silva Xavier, "Tiradentes", dressed as an ensign. Work by Wasth Rodrigues. 1940

Severo's commissioning of Wasth Rodrigues lacks documentary proof, even though it appears in several bibliographical references.

The delay in publishing Wasth Rodrigues' work, and the absence of any mention of Ricardo Severo in its content, is an indication of possible disagreements between the Portuguese engineer and the São Paulo painter.

Considering that "to build traditional art, traditional elements are needed" Severo used a method of architectural analysis that is based on the decomposition of the building into its constructive and decorative elements. Well aligned with the concept of architecture that was then predominant – in which the spatial conception of the work as a whole is practically independent of the type of ornamentation applied to the parietal surfaces -, Severo presented in his conference a kind of pre-inventory of traditional constructive elements of Brazilian architecture: roofs, eaves, windows, doors, kneecaps, etc.

=== Publications ===
He published several studies – "Documentário Arquitetônico Relativo à Antiga Construção Civil no Brasil" (Architectural Documentary on the Ancient Civil Construction in Brazil), 1945; "Mobiliário do Brasil Antigo e Evolução de Cadeiras Luso-Brasilieras" (Early Brazilian Furniture and the Evolution of Luso-Brazilian Chairs), 1948 – and executed several heraldic works for the government. He also acted as scenographer and costume designer, signing plays and sets for Alfredo Mesquita's shows, such as "Noite de São Paulo" (São Paulo Night), 1936, and "Casa Assombrada" (Haunted House), 1938.

== Artist from São Paulo ==
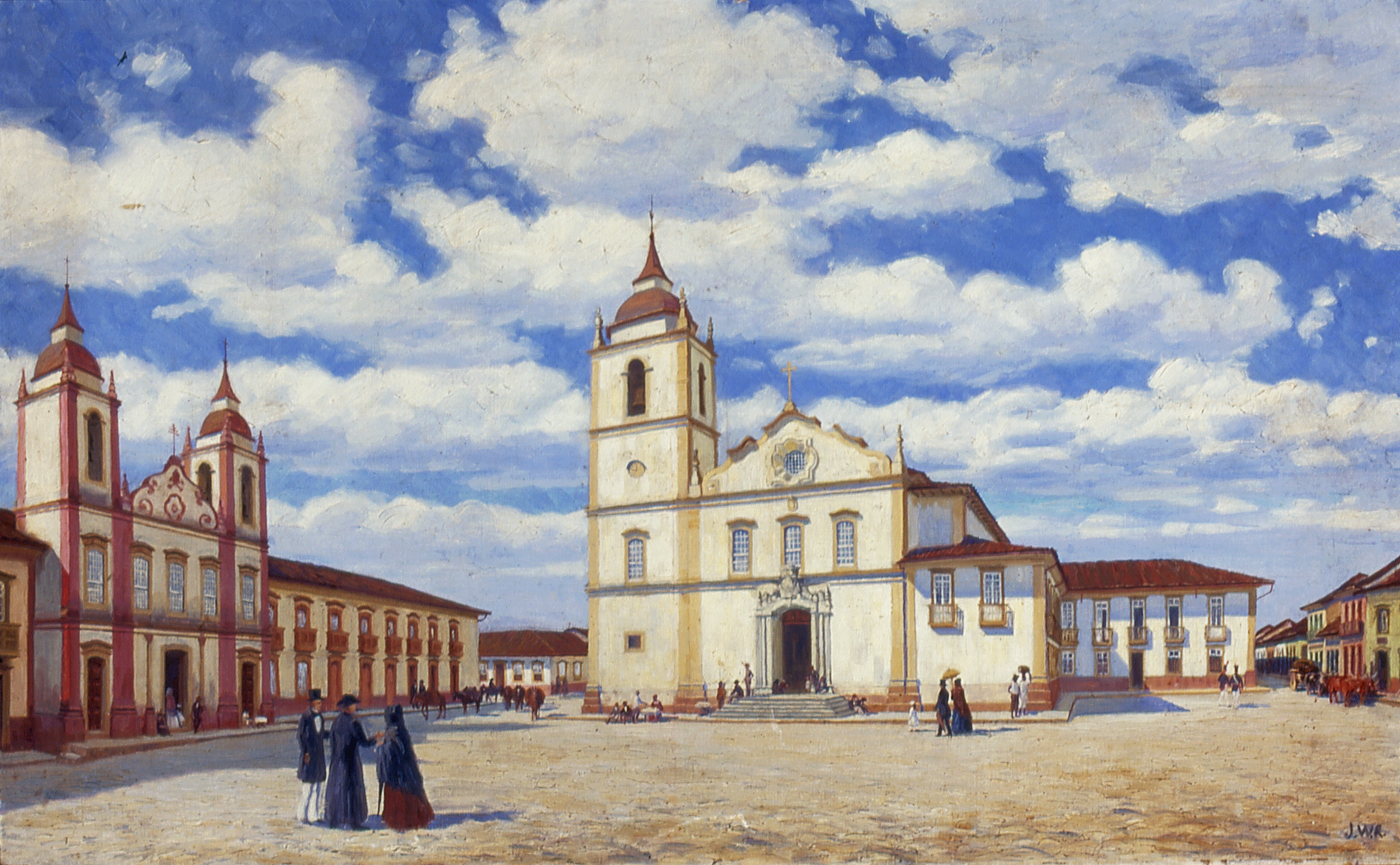
"Páteo e Igreja da Sé e São Pedro" (Courtyard and Church of the Cathedral and Saint Peter).

"São Paulo Antigo" (Old São Paulo) was part of the IVº Art Gallery's Watercolors and Drawings Exhibition in 1953. The theme of this exhibition was related to the context of the historical recoveries that were taking place in the city of São Paulo at that historical moment.

In "São Paulo Antigo", the gaze of José Wasth Rodrigues highlights the elements of colonial architecture, still easily identified in the buildings existing in the city of São Paulo in the 19th century. His gaze is again not limited to religious buildings, which were the vast majority of examples of this architecture at the time, but elements such as muxarabiê, crystal pinecones, railings and iron supports were also addressed by Wasth. Such items were highly valued in the drawings, and were in the foreground of the watercolors. The architectural detailing was not the only concern of the artist, who also started to introduce urban items in his works, and detailed the clothes that were seen in the streets – such as muleteers, slaves, carters, policemen, to exemplify and characterize the daily life and rhythm of the time. The period was notable for its relentless pursuit of creating a specific image of the city that was devoid of social contradictions. (Note: of a certain image of the city, devoid of social contradictions, salubrious and orderly. Historical paintings marked José Wasth Rodrigues' work, but his iconographic production is diverse: oil paintings, tiles, watercolors, pencil and pen-and-ink drawings can be observed throughout his career.)

Wasth Rodrigues had his first authorial exhibition in São Paulo, in 1902, in a collective show that gathered 406 works. In 1922, during the celebrations for the Centennial of Brazil's Independence, he was invited to make, together with Benedicto Calixto de Jesus, Henrique Manzo, Jonas de Barros, Nicola Petrilli and Berthe Adams Worms, seven paintings for the Paulista Museum, which was under the direction of Affonso d'Escragnolle Taunay. He was then invited by Victor Dubugras to make decorative tiles for the project to enhance the oldest obelisk in the city – the Piques Obelisk, located on Memória Square, and also the Monuments in honor of the connection between the capital and the city of Santos – the Caminho do Mar, formed by the Pouso de Paranapiacaba, the Cruzeiro Quinhentista, Lorena Viewpoint and Maioridade Ranch. The State of São Paulo was a great space of study and accomplishment of works for José Wasth Rodrigues.

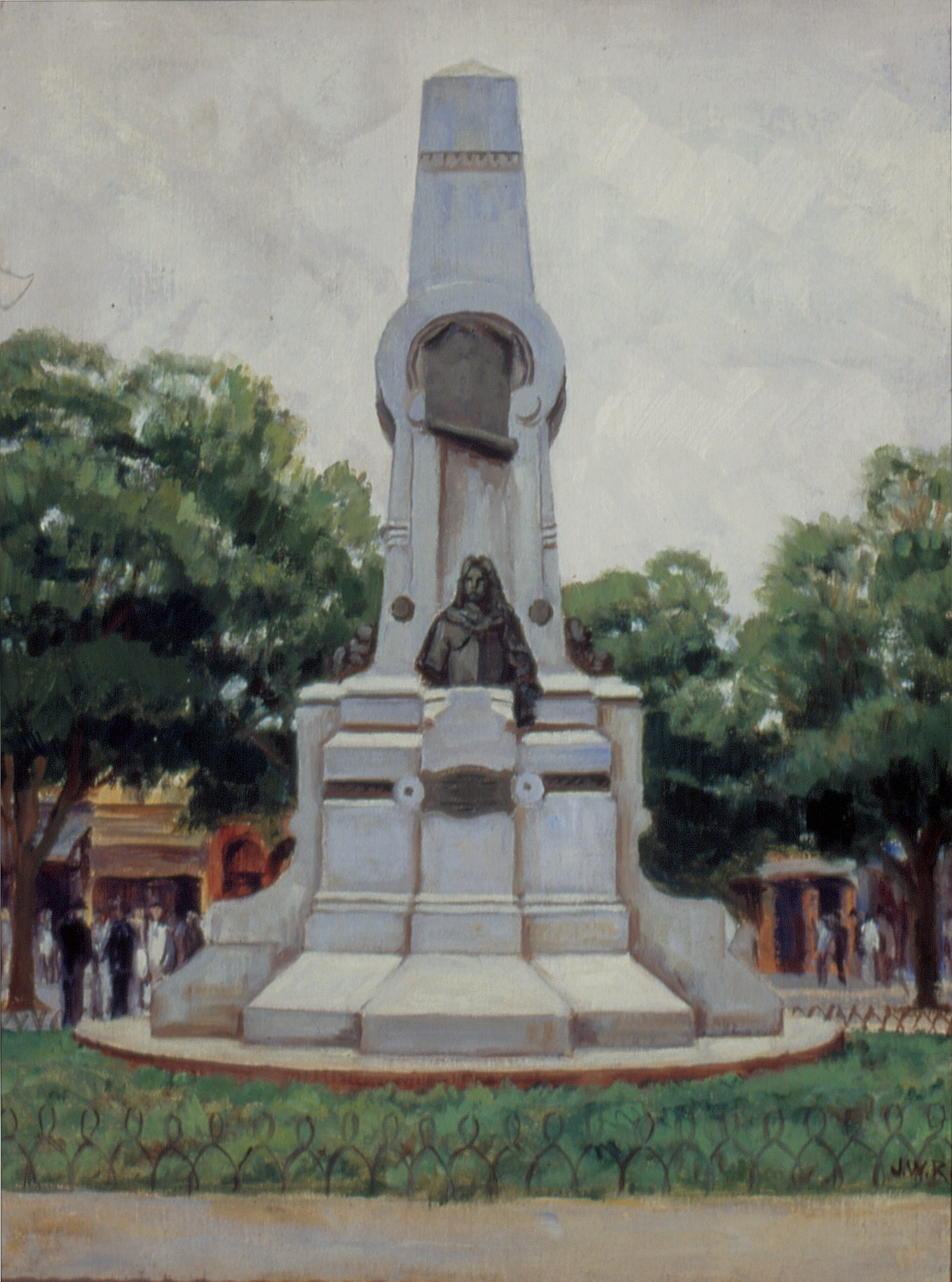
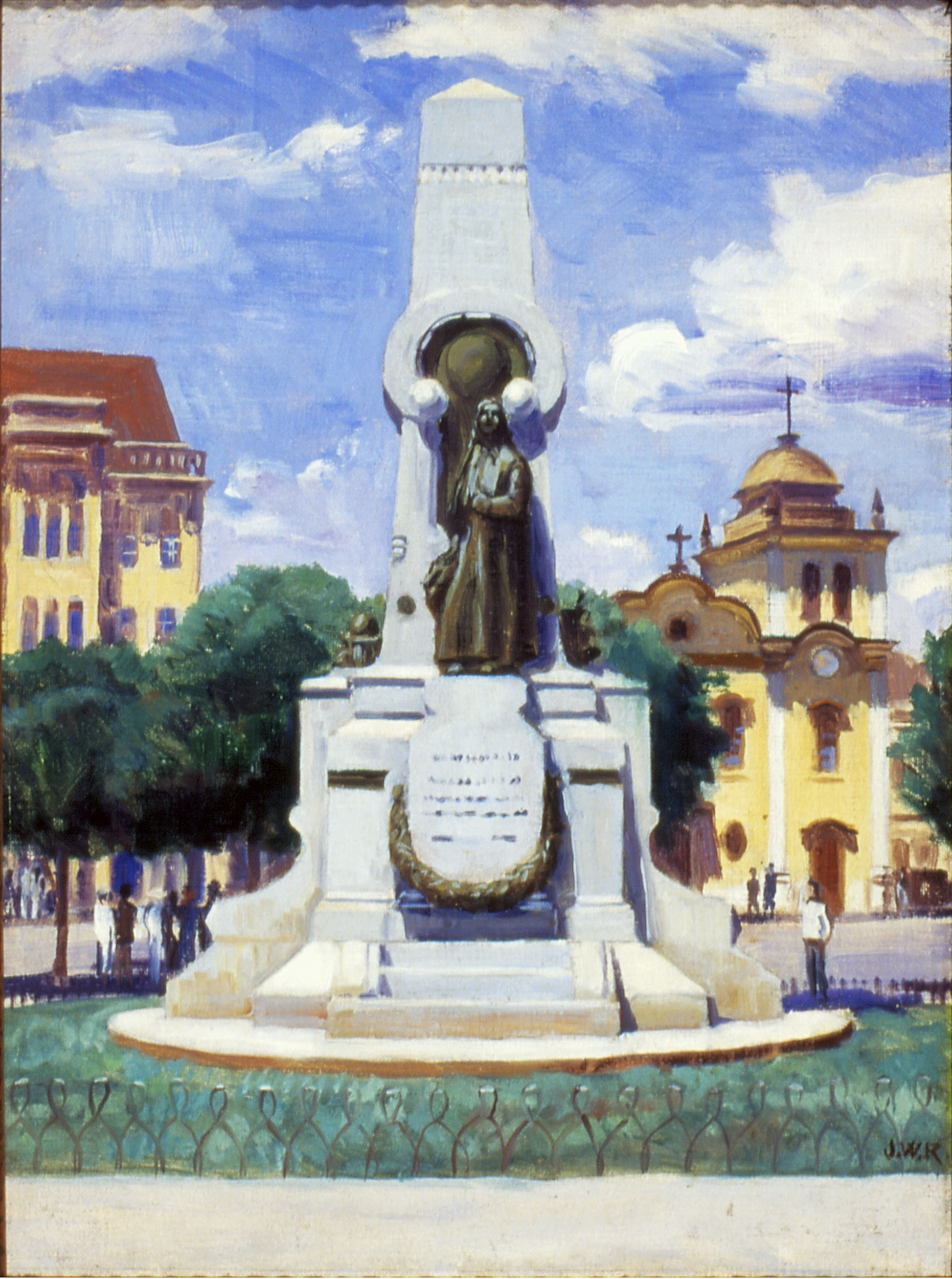
Main and rear view of the Bartolomeu de Gusmão Monument in Santos

A great part of these monuments designed by Dubugras, of tile composition, were characterized by the valorization of the Brazilian Neocolonial architectural style. When Wasth Rodrigues was called to make them for the Memória Square, he used elements that appeared in his oil paintings and watercolors. In a fountain, he registered muleteers, women carrying water, and soldiers, in several shades of blue. Allusive to the historical landmarks, the tile panels made for the Monuments of the Caminho do Mar, today part of the Anchieta Highway, pay tribute to the pioneers who climbed the mountain range towards the Piratininga plateau, building with their axes the path that connected São Paulo to the coast. Father José de Anchieta and the Jesuits in the Cruzeiro Quinhentista, are also part of this achievement.

Another São Paulo point registered by Wasth Rodrigues is the Lorena Viewpoint, a tribute to the governor of the Capitania of São Paulo, Bernardo José Maria de Lorena, and also to the donkey troops that climb the mountain range by the Lorena Sidewalk. The beginning of Portuguese colonization in Brazil is the theme of the panel at Maioridade Ranch, while at Pouso de Paranapiacaba a map of São Paulo roads projects the future of road connections between the various points of the state.

José Wasth Rodrigues participated in several projects in São Paulo, most notably the remodeling of the Piques obelisk in Memória Square, begun in 1919 by order of President Washington Luís. Wasth was widely recognized for his tile decoration.

== See also ==
- Ivan Wasth Rodrigues
- Monteiro Lobato
- Benedito Calixto
- Victor Dubugras
- Museu do Ipiranga
- Memória Square

== Bibliography ==
- Bastos, Sênia (2006). "Responsabilidade social, turismo e patrimônio histórico cultural paulistano: azulejos, aquarelas e pinturas históricas de José Wasth Rodrigues". Seminário de Pesquisa em Turismo do Mercosul, 4, 2006, Caxias do Sul-RS. Caxias do Sul: UCS.
- Chiarelli, Tadeu (30 December 1995). "O Novecento e a arte brasileira". Revista de Italianística. 3 (3): 109. doi:10.11606/ISSN.2238-8281.V3I3P109-134.
- Ficher, Sylvia (2005). Os arquitetos da Poli: ensino e profissão em São Paulo (in Brazilian Portuguese). EdUSP. ISBN 978-85-314-0873-1.
- Gonçalves, Ana Maria do Carmo Rossi (1977). A obra de Ricardo Severo. São Paulo: FAU-USP.
- Kessel, Carlos (2002). "Vanguarda efêmera: arquitetura neocolonial na Semana de Arte Moderna de 1922". Estudos Históricos. 2 (30). Rio de Janeiro: 110–128.
- Kessel, Carlos (2011). "Estilo, discurso, poder: arquitetura neocolonial no Brasil". História Social (6): 65–94.
- Lima, Solange Ferraz de; Carvalho, Vânia Carneiro de (1993). "São Paulo Antigo, uma encomenda da modernidade: as fotografias de Militão nas pinturas do Museu Paulista". Anais do Museu Paulista: História e Cultura Material. 1 (1): 147–178. doi:10.1590/S0101-47141993000100012.
- Nascimento, Flávia Brito do (2011). Blocos de memórias: habitação social, arquitetura moderna e patrimônio cultural. São Paulo: EDUSP. ISBN 978-85-314-1617-0.
- Pinheiro, Maria Lucia Bressan (1 April 2006a). "A história da arquitetura brasileira e a preservação do patrimônio cultural". Revista CPC (1): 41–74. doi:10.11606/issn.1980-4466.v0i1p41-74.
- Pinheiro, Maria Lucia Bressan (2006b). Responsabilidade social, turismo e patrimônio histórico cultural paulistano: azulejos, aquarelas e pinturas históricas de José Wasth Rodrigues (PDF). São Paulo: Sênia Bastos.
- Saia, Luís (1960). "Arquitetura Paulista". GFAU, Depoimentos 1, São Paulo. pp. 113–24.
- Santos, Paulo (1960). Presença de Lúcio Costa na Arquitetura Contemporânea do Brasil. Note 34. Rio de Janeiro.
- Severo, Ricardo (2006). "A Arte Tradicional no Brasil". Sociedade de Cultura Artística. Conferencias 1914–1915. São Paulo: Typographia Levi.
