= Flag of Dutch Brazil =

Flag of New Holland
- Use: Dutch West India Company
- Adopted: 1630-1654
- Design: Three horizontal stripes in red (o orange), white and blue, with the cypher GWC in the center
- Adopted: 1637?-1644?
- Design: Horizontal stripes in red, white and blue, with a crown and a gold monogram in the center
- Design: Horizontal stripes in red, white and blue, with a crown and a gold monogram in the center

The Flag of New Holland, also known as the flag of Dutch Brazil, was the flag used by the Dutch West India Company for the territories that were under its control in Brazil from 1630 until 1654. In this period, Brazil was not granted its own flag, and only the flags of its colonizers or rulers were used.

== History ==
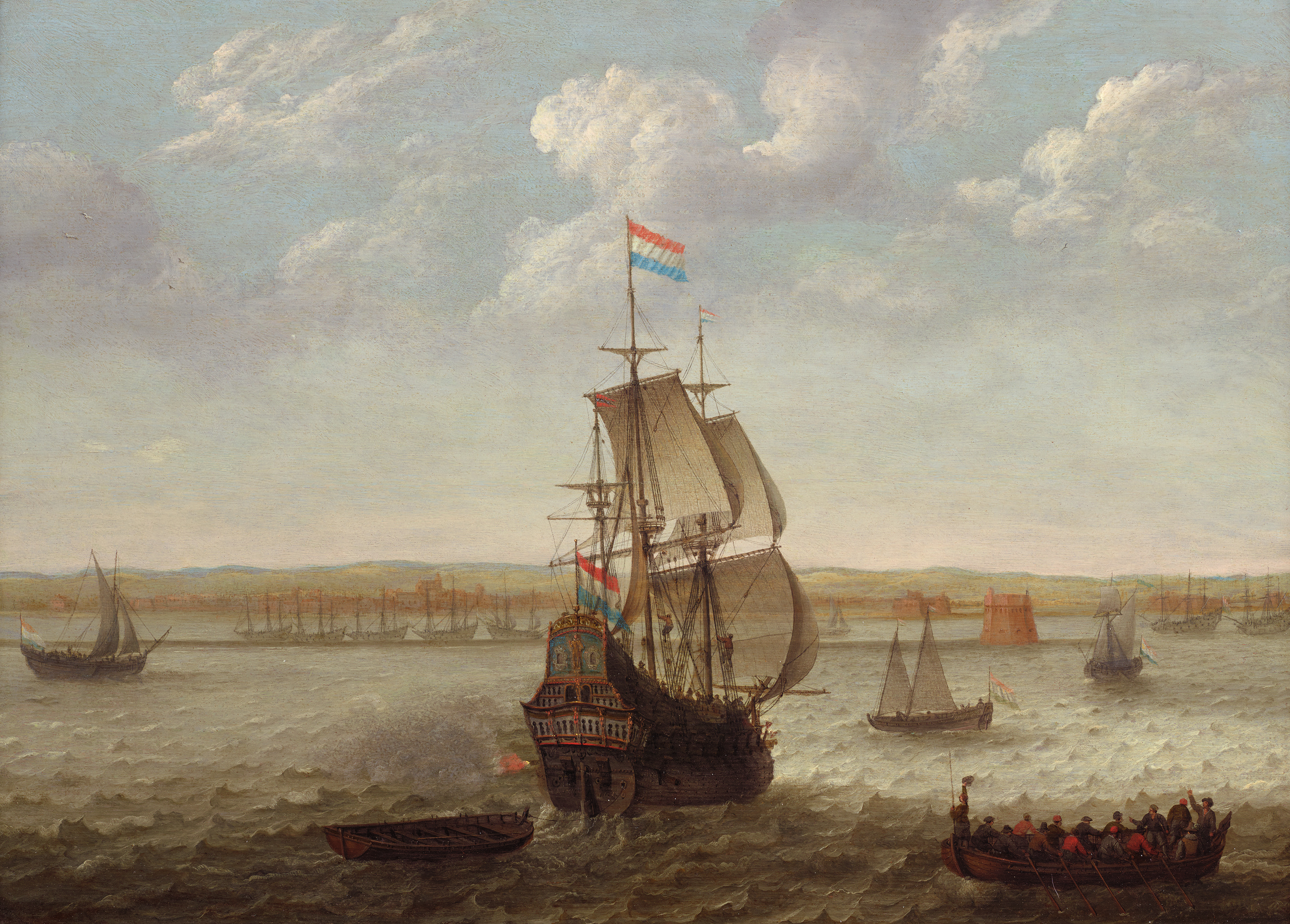
Dutch ships in the cove of Recife by Abraham Willaerts, 1640, with ships flying the Dutch Republic flag.

The conquered captaincies in Brazil during the Dutch rule used the flag of the Dutch West Indies Company (in Dutch: Geoctrooieerde Westindische Compagnie - GWC). This flag consists of the Republic of the Seven United Provinces of the Netherlands flag – horizontally striped in red (or orange), white and blue – with the inclusion of the company monogram (GWC) in the center.

The variation of orange or red on the flag is due to the fact that between 1588 and 1630 the Dutch navy always displayed the Prince's flag (Prinsenvlag), striped in orange, white and blue, and from 1663 on, always the flag of the General States flag (Statenvlag), striped in red, white, blue, with both variants of the flag being used during the period of 1630–1662.

It is quite possible that the Prinsenvlag and Statenvlag themselves were used in Brazil: in the book Ambrosij Richszhoffers, braszilianisch- und west indianische Reisze Beschreibung, private Ambrose Richshoffer records the use of the Prince's flag, as well as mentioning the use of its colors in the ensign costume

In the pictorial representations associated with Dutch Brazil, such as maps, engravings, paintings of battles, one rarely finds elements in the images that refer specifically to the West India Company (such as the monogram of the company), with the flags being represented just by the tricolor stripes. In a few engravings, one finds the reference to the company or its commanders, by means of coats of arms or monograms as ornament of the illustrations.

These flags were flown on the tops of forts, on the masts and sterns of ships, as well as wielded on battlefields by the ensign (vaendrager). The flags on the masts and sterns of ships also were used identify the vessels in combat, the admirals and vice admirals and even the tactical orientation of an attack.

== Description ==
In the book Brazões e Bandeiras do Brasil written by the journalist Clóvis Ribeiro in 1933, the flag of Dutch Brazil was illustrated by José Wasth Rodrigues and it consists of three horizontal stripes in the colors of the flag of the Republic of the Seven United Netherlands (red, white and blue) and it displays the monogram CIMD in the center of the white stripe and a crown above it, on the upper stripe, both gold-coloured. This illustration, however, is not found in the references cited by Ribeiro: in the German almanac Der Geöfnete Ritter-Plaz (Hamburg, 1702) there is only the tricolor flag of the United Provinces while in the book Rerum per octennium in Brasilia (Amsterdam, 1647) by Gaspar Barleus the Dutch flags are represented in the engravings without any inscription, with the exception of plate #45 (entitled Quartum prælium Coniovian inter et fluvium Rio Grande), where there is Dutch flag with the monogram IM in the cartouche of the illustration.

While the flag of the Dutch West India Company is relatively well documented, one finds no records of the tricolor flag with the IM or CIMD monogram in flag books or flag diagrams published between before the 19th century. Nevertheless, Clovis Ribeiro's work popularized such a design as the flag of Dutch Brazil, and it has been reproduced by several authors since then.

=== Nassau's Monogram ===
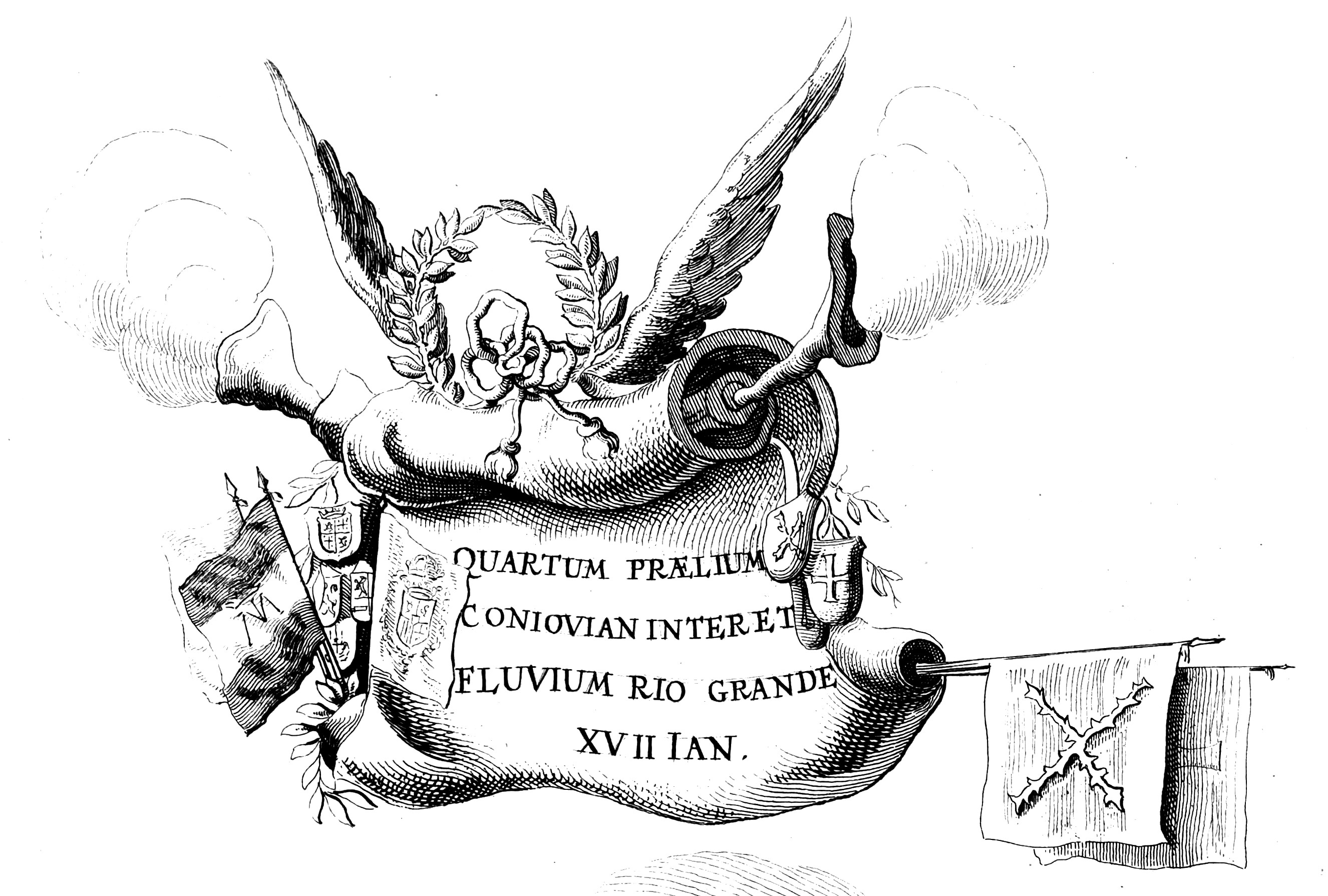
Cartouche of Quartum prælium Coniovian inter et fluvium Rio Grande (Plate 45 of Rerum per octennium in Brasilia).

The CIMD monogram with the crown of count is displayed in the frontispiece of Barleu's work, and it is associated with John Maurice, Prince of Nassau-Siegen, who ruled New Holland during 1637–1644 on behalf of the West India Company.

Its exact meaning is not known, but it is certain that the initials IM refer to Ionannes Mauritius, i.e., John Maurice of Nassau, as they are also represented in the painting Black Molher by Zacharias Wagenaer, and on other objects, such as a marble chair given as a gift by Nassau.

According to German archivist Rolf Nagel, the "I" and "M" of the monogram stand for "IOHANNES MAURITIUS", and make indication to the name of the flag holder; while and "C" and "D" are his personal qualities "COMES" and "DOMINUS", and the monogram should be read as "COMES IOHANNES MAURITIUS DOMINUS". Another plausible hypothesis is that the monogram means "Iohannes Mauritius Comitis Dillenburgum", i.e. "John Maurice, Count of (Nassau-)Dillenburg", Dillenburg being Maurice of Nassau's hometown. The last plate of Rerum per octennium in Brasilia is dedicated to the city of Dillenburg and adorned with Nassau's coat of arms.

== See also ==
- Flag of the Netherlands

== Bibliography ==
- Aubin, Nicolas (1737), "Planche 21", La connoissance des pavillons ou bannieres que la plûpart des nations arborent en mer (in French), The Hague: Jacques van den Kieboom, OCLC 65506395, Wikidata Q105745865
- Ribeiro, Clóvis (1933), Brazões e Bandeiras do Brasil (in Portuguese), Illustrator: José Wasth Rodrigues, São Paulo: São Paulo Editora, p. 387, OCLC 1297560, Wikidata Q105417680
- Coimbra, Raimundo Olavo (2000). A bandeira do Brasil: raízes histórico-culturais (3 ed.). Rio de Janeiro: IBGE.
- Nagel, Rolf (1979). "A Bandeira de Maurício de Nassau". Mensário do Arquivo Nacional. Rio de Janeiro: Arquivo Nacional. pp. 26–28. ISSN 0045-2726.
- Ferreira, Victor Bertocchi (2019). O pincel de Marte: as representações pictóricas da guerra entre neerlandeses e ibéricos no Atlântico (1621-1669) (Mestrado em História Social thesis). São Paulo: Universidade de São Paulo. doi:10.11606/D.8.2020.tde-03032020-171934.
- Kalff, S. (1899). "'t "Verzuimd Brasil"". De Gids: Nieuwe Vaderlandsche Letteroefeningen. 63: 191–233.
- Luz, Milton (2005). A História dos Símbolos Nacionais. Brasília: Senado Federal. p. 210.
- Richshoffer, Ambrósio (1897), Diario de um soldado da Companhia das Indias Occidentaes (1629-1632) (in Portuguese), translated by de Carvalho, Alfredo, Recife: Tipografia Universal, Wikidata Q106243329
