= Victor Dubugras =

French architect (1868-1933)

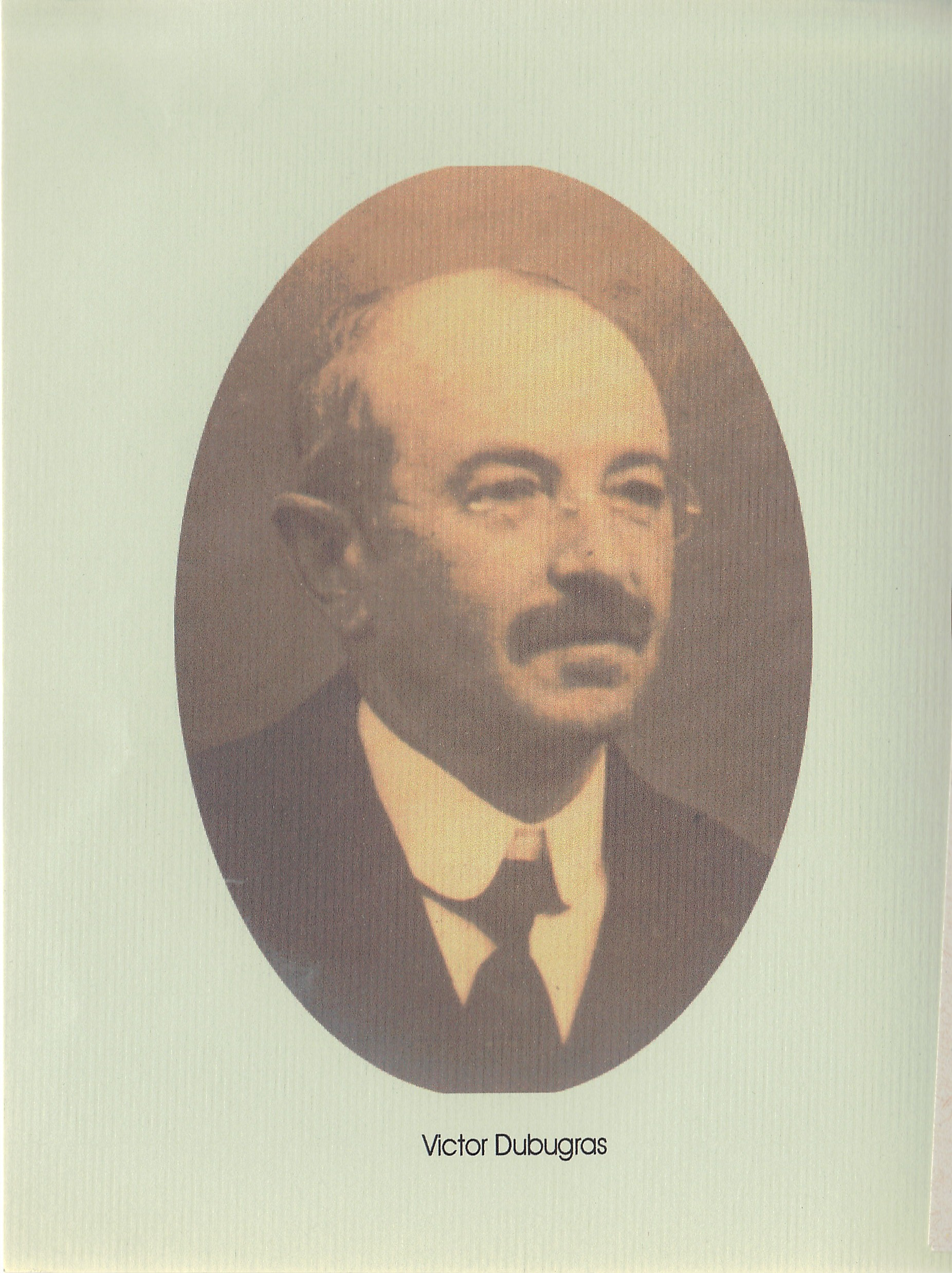
- Born: Victor Jean Baptiste Dubugras; 1868; Sarthe
- Died: 1933 (aged 64–65); Teresópolis
- Occupation: Architect
- Partner: Mary Helen MacKay Dubugras
- Projects: Mairinque Railroad Station

Victor Dubugras (Sarthe, 1868 - Teresópolis, 1933) was a French architect who grew up in Argentina and settled in Brazil.

Dubugras is considered by many one of the precursors of modern architecture in Latin America, where he achieved prestige for designing major works, such as the re-urbanization of Ladeira da Memória (English: Memory Hill) in 1921 and the Landings and Monuments of Paranapiacaba Mountain, between 1921 and 1922, dedicated to the celebrations of Brazil's Centennial of Independence.

Dubugras was recognized for teaching the architecture class at the Polytechnic School of the University of São Paulo (Poli-USP) and for participating in the Society of Architects and the Engineering Institute of São Paulo. He had intimate contact and worked with important people of the time, such as the then mayor and future president of Brazil, Washington Luís, for whom he rendered services until mid-1927.

His style transited between eclecticism, art nouveau, neocolonial, and modernism.

Unfortunately, many of his works and creations have not been preserved. One of the works that remains is the Mayrink (or Mairinque) Railroad Station in São Paulo, built between 1906 and 1907 and considered the first reinforced concrete structure made in the state. The Euclides da Cunha building, the headquarters of the São Carlos City Hall, was also designed by him and is very well preserved.

== Early years and training ==
Victor Dubugras was born in 1868 in the small community of La Fléche, in the Sarthe region of western France. He moved as a child with his family to Buenos Aires, where he began his studies in architecture.

Not much is known about what kind of training he obtained in Argentina, but while in the country, as a young man, he worked in the office of Francesco Tamburini, a renowned Italian architect who had previously worked for the local government and was the author of major works such as the Casa Rosada and the great Teatro Colón. It is likely that Dubugras "attended an academy of fine arts or received his professional apprenticeship directly in an office, perhaps from the architect Tamburini in Buenos Aires."

When Tamburini died in 1891, Dubugras came to São Paulo. In the city, he began working at Banco União, directed by the architect Ramos de Azevedo, where he remained until 1894. He joined the Public Works Department of São Paulo and in the same year he took on the position of class professor, teaching several subjects to the students of the Polytechnic School of the University of São Paulo, most of the time in the fundamental and general course classes: "Topographic Drawing and Elements of Architecture" from 1895 to 1900–1901; "Architectural and Cartographic Drawing" from 1901–1902 to 1909–1910; "Freehand Drawing and Elementary Geometry" and "Perspective and Architectural Drawing" from 1911 to 1917; "Freehand Drawing and Architectural Ornaments " and "Architectural and Perspective Drawings" from 1918 to 1925; "Architectural Drawing and Sketch of the Natural" in 1926. In the civil engineering course he taught "Corresponding Graphic Works" in 1894 and "Construction Projects and Machine Design" in 1901. He also taught in the agricultural engineering and the engineer-architect courses.

The position of class professor was, in general, filled by professionals without a college degree or with degrees not recognized by the Poli-USP. There, he was admitted as a professor in 1925 and remained until April 1927, when he retired. Due to the high finishing requirements, the architect and professor was considered quite temperamental by his students.

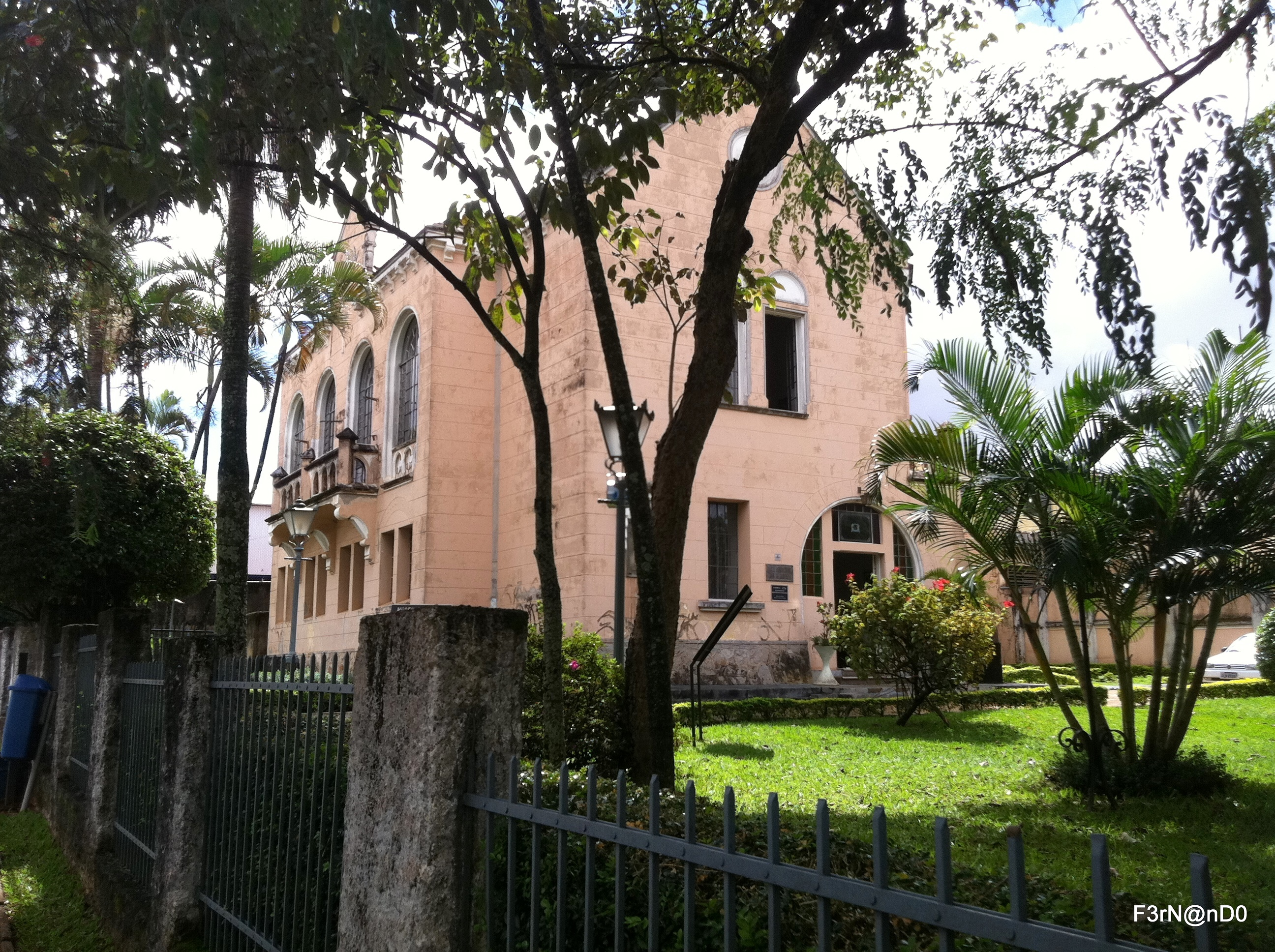
José Chiachiri Municipal Historical Museum, an eclectic-style building designed by Dubugras and inaugurated in 1896.

Concerned about fulfilling his dreams of art, he often had part of the building he was constructing demolished at his own expense because he felt it did not correspond to what he had dreamed of. This meant that he was sometimes misunderstood and did not get materially the reward of his great life of work, professional honesty and art.

In 1897, Dubugras opened his own company of projects and constructions and consolidated a successful trajectory in the city of São Paulo. During the first years of the 20th century, Dubugras took part in several contests for the construction of important works, such as the Parish Church of Ribeirão Preto, in São Paulo.

In 1911, the architect was part of the group of graduates of the Engineering Institute of São Paulo. He won second place in the competition for economical houses for the proletariat, a class of completely isolated buildings, organized by Mayor Washington Luis, for whom he did several jobs in later years.

In 1928, the architect moved to Rio de Janeiro, where he developed more outstanding works, such as a restaurant located in Alto da Boa Vista and other condominiums inspired by the garden cities of England.

Besides São Paulo and Rio de Janeiro, Dubugras headed construction and renovations in smaller cities in São Paulo, such as Santos, Ribeirão Preto, and Sorocaba, and in Bahia, state where he designed the reconstruction of the Medical School in Salvador and the Presidential Villa of Vitoria, at the request of Governor José Marcelino de Souza.

== Relevance of the works and notable events ==
Victor Dubugras became well known for carrying out several projects commissioned by the Public Power and was even considered one of the precursors of modern architecture in Latin America. His styles transited between neocolonial, modernism, eclecticism, art nouveau and, above all, the teacher and architect worked with rationality in the execution of each work: "In Dubugras' work, wood was wood and granite was granite".

In 1891, in São Paulo, he designed schools, jails, and forums for the State Department of Agriculture, Commerce, and Public Works, among which stand out those of the school group of Botucatu and the forums of Avaré, Araras, and São Carlos, mainly in the Romanesque and Neo-Gothic styles.

In 1897, Dubugras built his residence on Paulista Avenue and, between 1902 and 1904, on the same avenue, he designed the palaces of Flávio Uchoa and Horácio Sabino, in the art nouveau style. Soon after, in 1906, Dubugras designed the train station of Mairinque, in São Paulo, which was considered a precursor work of modern architecture in Brazil, built in iron and cement, with relevant characteristics for the time.

In 1910, he accompanied and rendered services to Washington Luiz (1870 - 1970), the then mayor of the city of São Paulo, who later became governor of the state and president of the Republic. Among the projects are the Ladeira da Memória, 1919, and the Landings and Monuments of the Paranapiacaba Mountains, mid-1921 and 1922. The first one was remodeled by Dubugras and the artist José Wasth Rodrigues, at Washington's invitation, where they put a new fountain and a portico with tiles decorated with the city's coat of arms, dedicated to the celebrations of Brazil's Centennial of Independence. In 1916, the architect received the gold medal at the General Exposition of Fine Arts in Rio de Janeiro and, in 1927, the silver medal at the Pan-American Congress of Architects in Buenos Aires, Argentina.

Debugras participated in numerous contests, in which he presented his projects. He came in second in the competition for the Municipal Theater of Rio de Janeiro and in the contest for economical houses for the proletariat, in the class completely isolated buildings, organized by his friend Washington Luis, in 1916. That same year he was one of the founding members of the Engineering Institute of São Paulo.

He also participated in the following exhibitions:

1901 - General Exhibition of Fine Arts, Rio de Janeiro (silver medal).

1902 - Municipal Exhibition of São Paulo (silver medal).

1904 - St. Louis Exposition, United States (silver medal).

1916 - Centennial Exhibition of the National School of Fine Arts, Rio de Janeiro (small gold medal).

== Final years and posthumous tributes ==
From what is known about Victor Dubugras' death, he died in 1933, in the city of Teresópolis, Rio de Janeiro.

In 1997, the Third International Architecture Biennale took place at Ibirapuera Park in São Paulo. Among prominent international architects such as Oswaldo Bratke and Gerrit Rietveld, Victor Dubugras was one of those who had original drawings and photographic panels exhibited.

In 2002, the Faculty of Architecture and Urbanism of the University of São Paulo (FAU/USP) and the Caixa Econômica Federal Cultural Complex of São Paulo organized a special exhibition with only works by Dubugras, entitled "Quota of Art - Victor Dubugras - Precursor of Modernism", organized by the then professor Nestor Goulart Reis, from the FAU.

The show was divided in two parts: one with original drawings, which were donated to FAU, and of some of his students when Dubugras taught at the Polytechnic School; and another that was composed of photographs that the architect himself used to document the construction of his projects, all of them lent by his great-grandson.

Dubugras' grandson and also architect Elvin Donald Mackey Dubugras was the one who donated most of his grandfather's drawings to FAU. Although most of the works by the architect have not been preserved, it is possible that they are still known today because of the work and studies of several researchers such as Benedito Lima de Toledo and Nestor Goulart Reis Filho.

== Analysis ==
Victor Dubugras knew how to transit through several and different types of construction, as well as how to find for each one a different architectural style, always focused on the rational. His students and colleagues honored these "real structures" in which all the materials used and structures made were put in evidence.

Certainly the diversity of styles was great. The improvement of the industry made possible countless solutions, a full plate to the imagination and the craving for novelty of architects and clients. Some, however, were increasingly averse to fantasy, clamoring for flat, "sincere", and smooth surfaces. This was the case with some students at the Polytechnic, who sublimated in Dubugras the use of reinforced concrete, formal austerity, and exposure of the nature of materials.

Dubugras' eclectic style allowed him to elaborate both monumental and simpler constructions. He always sought innovation, and each work acquired its author's own look and personality.

== Works ==
- House at Taguá street - São Paulo (city);
- Horácio Sabino House - home of the notorious coffee entrepreneur, which was replaced by the Conjunto Nacional, at Paulista Avenue;
- Mayrink Railway Station - protected by IPHAN since 2002;
- Araras Culture House - Araras, São Paulo;
- Largo da Memória (English: Memory Square) - in São Paulo (city); Dubugras participated in the reform carried out in the beginning of the 20th century;
- Palacete Uchoa - a work of 1902 at Caio Prado street, in São Paulo (city), in which the Des Oiseaux School was installed in 1907 and demolished in the 1970s;
- Landing at Serra do Mar - São Paulo (city);
- Criminal Forum of São Carlos - São Carlos;
- José Chiachiri Municipal Historical Museum - Franca, São Paulo;
- Immigration Museum - Santa Barbara d'Oeste, São Paulo;
- Fernando Nobre's family house, at 232 Higienópolis Avenue - São Paulo (city),1920.

== Bibliography ==
- MIYOSHI, Alex. Victor Dubugras, arquiteto dos caminhos (PDF).
- REIS Filho, Nestor Goulart. Victor Dubugras - precursor da arquitetura moderna na América Latina. São Paulo: Editoras Quota de Arte, Edusp e Via das Artes. p. 144.
