= Ivan Wasth Rodrigues =

Brazilian painter

- Born: 1 July 1927; São Paulo
- Died: 20 December 2007
- Occupations: Painter, comics artist
- Awards: Troféu Angelo Agostini for Master of National Comics (2001)

Ivan Wasth Rodrigues (São Paulo, July 1, 1927 - December 10, 2007) was a Brazilian painter and comics artist.

== Life and work ==
He learned painting at the ateliers of José Wasth Rodrigues (his uncle), Cid Affonso Rodrigues and Vittorio Gobbis, and also at the Escola de Belas-Artes de São Paulo.

He started his professional career as a book illustrator for the Melhoramentos publishing house and doing advertising design. In the field of comics, he designed a two-part book for EBAL publishing house on the history of Brazil and the adaptation of the classic Casa-Grande & Senzala, by Gilberto Freire. For Freire's book, which talks about the period of slavery in Brazil, Wasth Rodrigues researched for five months the paintings of Jean-Baptiste Debret (one of the first artists to portray Brazilian society in the early 19th century). I

n 2001, he was awarded with the Prêmio Angelo Agostini for Master of National Comics, an award that aims to honor artists who have dedicated themselves to Brazilian comics for at least 25 years.
