= Largo da Batata =

Coordinates: 23°33′59″S 46°41′39″W

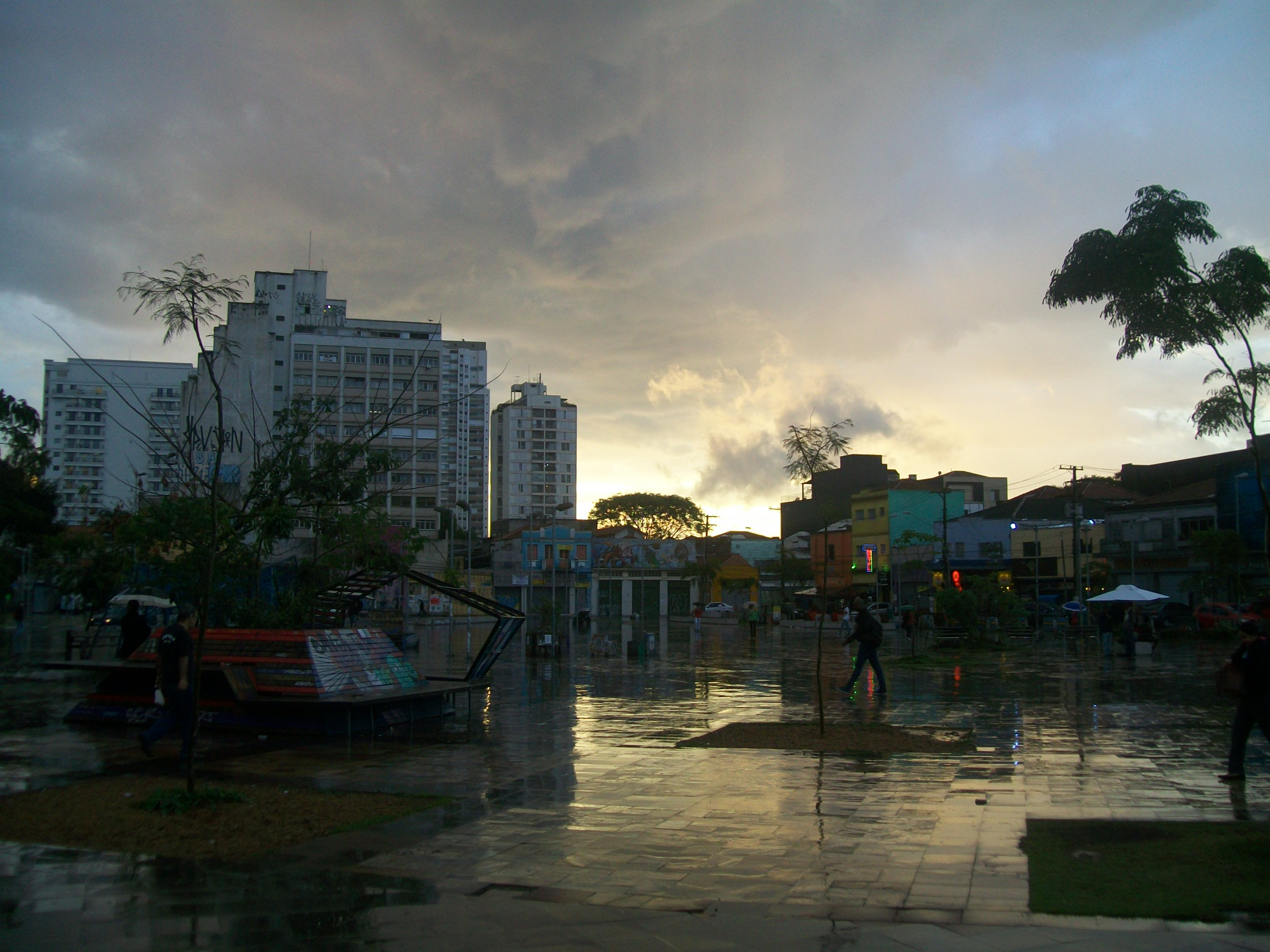
Largo da Batata, Pinheiros, São Paulo.

Largo da Batata is a public square located in the district of Pinheiros, in the Brazilian city of São Paulo. It is located at the confluence of Brigadeiro Faria Lima Avenue and the streets Pinheiros, Teodoro Sampaio, Cardeal Arcoverde, Baltazar Carrasco, Martim Carrasco, Chopin Tavares de Lima and Fernão Dias.

The Metro Line 4 Faria Lima Station and the Largo da Batata bus terminal (under construction) are located there. Largo da Batata has become a rallying point for political demonstrations.

== History ==
There are records of the region's occupation by native people around 1560, the year that marks the foundation of the district of Pinheiros. The Guayana Indians were transferred from the village of São Paulo de Piratininga to the region, where the chapel of Nossa Senhora da Conceição was founded by Jesuits José de Anchieta and Manuel da Nóbrega.

In the 20th century, a market for agricultural products, known as the Mercado Caipira, was established in the region and, from 1909, a municipal market was built. The place has been known as Largo da Batata (Potato Square or Potato Plaza) since the 1920s because it concentrated potato vendors near the Cooperativa Agrícola de Cotia (Cotia Agricultural Cooperative) stand. However, the square only received the name officially in July 2012, by Law nº 15.615 / 2012.

== See also ==
- Largo da Memória
