= Immigration Museum (Santa Bárbara d'Oeste) =

Museum in Saõ Paulo, Brazil

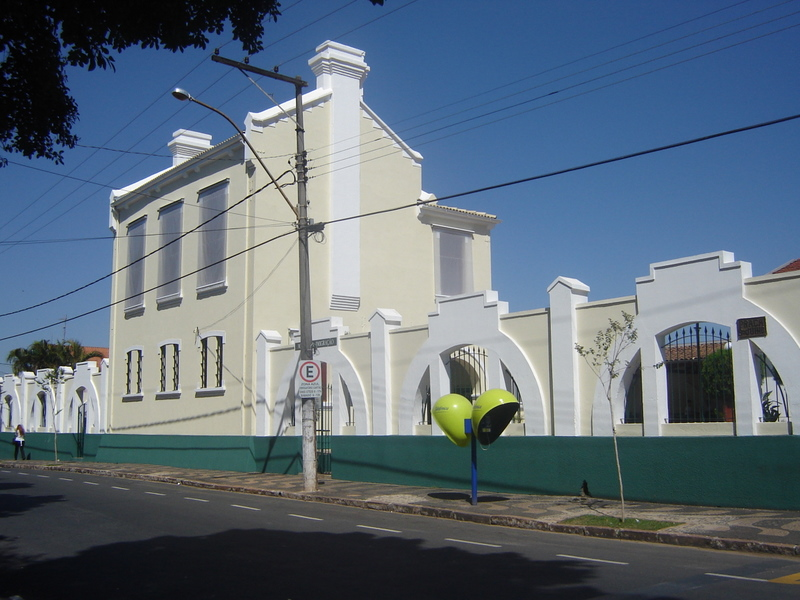
- Type: History museum
- Inauguration: 30 January 1988
- Country: Brazil
- City: Santa Bárbara d'Oeste
- Coordinates: 22°45′20″S 47°24′58″W

The Immigration Museum (Museu da Imigração) is a public museum located in the city of Santa Bárbara d'Oeste, in the countryside of the state of São Paulo, Brazil. It was founded on 30 January 1988, from the collection of the Fraternity of American Descendants, a civil society organization responsible for managing the Cemetery of the Americans. It is subordinated to the Municipal Secretariat of Culture and Tourism.

The museum is housed in the former town hall and jail of Santa Bárbara d'Oeste, a building opened in 1896, designed in eclectic style by French architect Victor Dubugras. It is equipped with a specialized library and has an annex dedicated to the documentation of the city, the Santa Bárbara d'Oeste Memory Center. It holds long and short-term exhibitions and cultural and educational activities. Its collection is composed of historical objects and documents related to the city's history and to the settlement waves that came to the region in the middle of the 19th century, especially North American immigrants, who came after the end of the Civil War.

== History ==
The Immigration Museum was officially established on 30 January 1988, at the end of Mayor José Maria de Araújo Júnior's term. The creation of a museum dedicated to preserving the memory of Santa Bárbara d'Oeste and of the immigrants who settled in the city since the end of the 19th century aimed to meet a long-standing demand of the residents. To serve as the museum's headquarters, the former town hall and jailhouse was chosen, due to its architectural and historical importance, as well as its privileged location in the city center, next to Nove de Julho Square. Work to adapt the building began in 1987. At the time, the intention to occupy the building caused friction with the State Government of São Paulo (then under Franco Montoro's administration), which claimed to be the owner of the building.

The project was in the hands of the Administrative Commission of the Immigration Museum, formed by representatives of several cultural organizations of the city, and was guided by museologists Júlio Abe and Maria Inês Mantovani, from São Paulo. The initial nucleus of the collection corresponded to a set of pieces transferred from a small memorial kept by the Fraternity of American Descendants, near the Campo (or "American's") Cemetery, where the pioneers of American immigration and their descendants are buried. In the years following its foundation, the museum's collection was expanded through donations from residents and sporadic acquisitions. The identification, organization, and selection of the pieces were carried out by the aforementioned museologists, in addition to researchers from the municipality and volunteers.

The exhibition circuit is still close to its original conception. It is divided into eight rooms, approaching various themes. On the first floor, objects, photographs, documents, and didactic panels related to the history of Santa Bárbara d'Oeste and the former public jail are exhibited. Also on the first floor, the "Antônio Duarte Artist Room" is dedicated to temporary exhibitions. On the upper floor, the collection of objects of the American Descendants Fraternity and other objects and documents related to the immigration waves can be found.

In September 2000, during the celebrations of the 182nd anniversary of the city, the Memory Center of Santa Bárbara d'Oeste was created, from the dismemberment of part of the documental collection of the Immigration Museum, to which was added the documental collection of the Santa Bárbara television channel TV Cultura. The center aims to collect, preserve, and disseminate documents related to the history of the city. It operates in a building attached to the museum, also next to the Maria Aparecida Nogueira Municipal Library, and maintains, in addition to its archival functions, a cultural program, organizing workshops, debates, and educational projects.

In the mid-2000s, the building, compromised by lack of maintenance, was closed for public visits. The reopening took place in June 2008, after the execution of restoration works, which included the replacement of the roof, the implementation of gutters to prevent infiltration, and the replacement of baseboards to eliminate termites that compromised the building's structure. At the reopening, the project Imagens da Zona Leste ("Images of the East Zone") was launched, developed by the Memory Center, in partnership with the Professor Léo Sallum Cultural Center and Library. The project consisted of an effort to recover and digitize historical images of residents, events, places, and establishments in the city's East Zone. The same year was the 20th anniversary of the museum, highlighted by the exhibition Cenas da Minha Terra ("Scenes from my Land"), with photographs by José Roberto Bueno.

The Immigration Museum and the Memory Center are today the main sources of information, documentation, and references related to the history of Santa Bárbara d'Oeste and North American immigration to the region. They receive an average of 20,000 visitors per year. The museum also maintains an eclectic schedule of temporary exhibitions. Since February 2011, the museum has benefited from an agreement between the Secretariat of Culture and Tourism of Santa Bárbara d'Oeste and the Industrial Social Services (SESI), aiming to hold monthly exhibitions in the "Antônio Duarte Artist Room". The agreement provides for the organization alternating exhibitions of established artists with local artists and is inserted in the context of a more comprehensive project devised by SESI, called Caixas da Cultura ("Culture Boxes"), which aims to facilitate the access of the countryside population to cultural manifestations more restricted to large Brazilian urban centers.

== Building ==
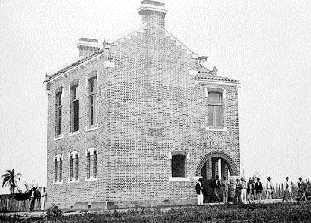
The Santa Bárbara d'Oeste town hall and jailhouse at the beginning of the 20th century.

The Immigration Museum is housed in the former town hall and jailhouse of Santa Bárbara d'Oeste. The building was designed by Victor Dubugras, a French architect living in Brazil, responsible for the idealization of a set of public buildings commissioned by the Government of the State of São Paulo in the late nineteenth century. Its construction was financed by the Department of Public Works of São Paulo. The building, inaugurated in 1896, is one of the oldest in the city.

Conceived in an eclectic style, in brick masonry, with Art Nouveau details, the two-story building differs from other constructions by Dubugras in the countryside of São Paulo for presenting a more "rationalist" style, in detriment of the neo-gothic and Romanesque influence that marks the production of the architect in this period. The building's design has some similarities with the style adopted by Dubugras in the construction of his residence in the São Paulo capital, such as the chimneys standing out in the pediments, the metallic ornaments at the ends of the walls, the setae with beaten arches and the simple design of the wooden staircase.

In 1913, the City Council left the building and returned to its old headquarters. The public jail, however, continued to function in the building until the end of the 1970s. By then, the place had already become inadequate to continue this function, as its capacity was exhausted, resulting in disobedience to the minimum standards of hygiene, safety, and comfort of the inmates. Its location, in the middle of the city center, also hindered its use. To solve this problem, the city government provided the state government with land to build a new police station and jail. After being vacated, the building remained closed for almost a decade. In 1987, it underwent renovations to adapt it for museum use, hosting the Immigration Museum since the institution's inauguration the following year. A new renovation was completed in June 2008.

== Collection ==
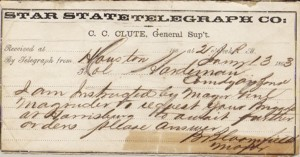
Telegram from the American company Start State Telegraph Co. (1869). Collection of the Immigration Museum.

The collection of the Immigration Museum covers mainly the history of the city of Santa Bárbara d'Oeste and the settlement waves that came to the region, especially the North American immigration. Its initial nucleus corresponds to the collection of the Fraternity of American Descendants, having been progressively expanded through donations from the city hall, city, and regional residents, as well as exchanges, loans, and sporadic acquisitions.

The collection is composed of various objects (clothing, porcelain, furniture, household utensils, war weapons, manuscripts, documents, etc.) once belonging to prominent personalities in the region, immigrants who settled in the city in the second half of the nineteenth century (Dodson, Mac-Knigh Jones, Thatcher families, etc. ), and other items (archaeological artifacts, photographs, rare books, documents, newspapers, magazines, etc.) that depict the daily life of the city and the lifestyle of the society then.

The collection of the Santa Bárbara d'Oeste Memory Center, formed from the dismemberment of part of the Immigration Museum collection, the collection of TV Cultura de Santa Bárbara, documents transferred from the Municipal Archives, and private donations, is composed of videotapes, photographs, negatives, slides, manuscripts, periodicals, maps, receipts, minute books, among other documents related to the public administration and personalities from the city.

== See also ==
- Immigration Museum of the State of São Paulo

== Bibliography ==
- Comissão de Patrimônio Cultural da Universidade de São Paulo (2000). Guia de Museus Brasileiros (in Portuguese). São Paulo: Edusp. p. 408.
- Secretaria da Ciência e Tecnologia do Estado de São Paulo (1988). Museu da Imigração, Santa Bárbara d'Oeste (in Portuguese). Exposição inaugural, Americanos no Brasil – Perfil de uma imigração. São Paulo: SCT.
