= José Chiachiri Municipal Historical Museum =

Museum in Franca, Brazil

Coordinates: 20.5356°S 47.3992°W

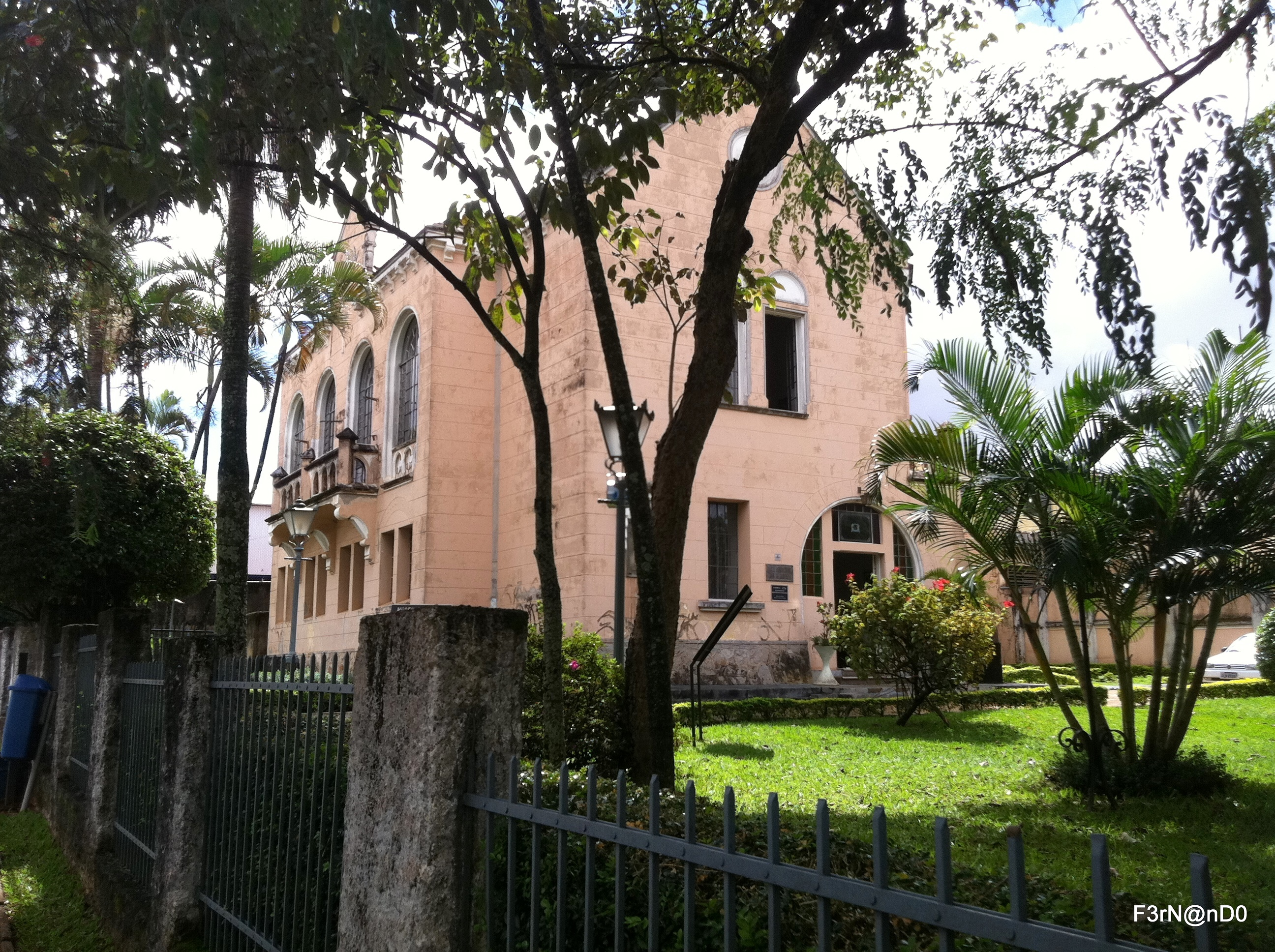
- Facade of the José Chiachiri Historical Museum, an eclectic-style building designed by French architect Victor Dubugras
- Established: 1957
- Location: Franca, São Paulo state, Brazil

The José Chiachiri Municipal Historical Museum (Portuguese: Museu Histórico Municipal José Chiachiri) is a cultural equipment subordinated to the Sports, Art and Culture Foundation (FEAC) of the city of Franca, in the interior of the state of São Paulo, Brazil. Created in 1957 by initiative of journalist José Chiachiri, the museum is the institution responsible for guarding, preserving and promoting the historical heritage of the city and surrounding region. It is situated in the old Public Jail of Franca, a building in eclectic style, projected by the French architect Victor Dubugras, inaugurated in 1896 and listed as a heritage site by Condephaat in 1997.

The museum has one of the most important historical collections in the interior of the state of São Paulo, with approximately 4,000 pieces, related to events and personalities of Franca and other cities in the region. It also has a historical archive and a specialized library, temporary exhibitions, and educational, cultural, and community activities. The museum has an internship agreement with the Human and Social Sciences College of the São Paulo State University.

== History ==
Franca's Municipal Historical Museum was officially established by Municipal Law 656 of September 13, 1957, sanctioned by the then mayor Onofre Sebastião Gosuen, with the objective of ensuring the preservation of material evidence of the history of Franca and surrounding region. Its effective creator and founder was the journalist José Chiachiri, responsible for conducting an intense campaign to collect objects to form the collection of the future museum during the 1950s. As a result, several objects were donated by the public power and by families from Franca, from other cities in the northwest of São Paulo and the southwest of Minas Gerais, making the initiative possible.

At first, the museum was set up in the former residence of Captain Acácio Alípio Pereira, on Doutor Júlio Cardoso Street, and was opened to the public on March 9, 1959. In 1970, in order to accommodate the pieces in a more suitable location, the local authorities transferred the museum to its current headquarters, the city's old Public Jail (a building also occupied by the city's Courthouse, the City Council and the City Hall), designed by Victor Dubugras and inaugurated in 1896. After José Chiachiri's death in 1972, the museum had its name changed, through the publication of Decree 3626 on May 18, 1976, to include the founder's name. Later, historian and museologist Margarida Borges Pansani took over the direction of the museum, remaining at the head of the institution for more than two decades.

Throughout its more than 50 years, the José Chiachiri Municipal Historical Museum has consolidated itself as one of the most important historical museums of the interior of the state of São Paulo, especially due to the recognized importance of its collection for the history of the northeast region of São Paulo. The institution has been the object of researches carried out by several levels of expertise in different areas of knowledge - especially those conducted by the academic community of the former Faculty of Philosophy, Sciences and Languages of Franca (current the Human and Social Sciences College of the São Paulo State University).

The museum holds permanent and itinerant exhibitions, of long and short duration, lends pieces from the collection to partner institutions, offers monitored visits for students, conducts research and selects material for consultation, besides organizing book launches and cycles of debates and lectures on the region's history. The institution has a specialized library and the only air-conditioned archive in the region, and welcomes, on average, one hundred visitors per day.

In 2009, on the occasion of the celebrations of the fiftieth anniversary of the museum's inauguration, several activities were organized in collaboration with the Paulo Duarte Association, such as the retrospective exhibition Retratando nossa história: uma apresentação do passado no presente (English: Portraying our history: a presentation of the past in the present), and a series of educational activities with the theme Redescobrindo um acervo eclético (English: Rediscovering an eclectic collection).

== Building ==
Since 1970, the José Chiachiri Municipal Historical Museum is installed in the building of the old Public Jail, opened in 1896, located at Campos Salles street, at the corner with General Carneiro street, in downtown Franca. Its project, in eclectic style, with strong reminiscences of neo-romantic architecture, was elaborated by the French architect Victor Dubugras.

The building housed the Public Jail and the Courthouse of Franca until 1913, when it began to be used as the City Hall headquarters, under the name of Paço Municipal Rui Barbosa. Later it was also the headquarters of the City Council. On August 11, 1997, by means of Decree 7,420, the building was declared a heritage site by Condephaat.

== Collection ==
The José Chiachiri Municipal Historical Museum has a collection of approximately 4,000 pieces, of various types, origins, and time periods. It is a reference collection in terms of the history of northwestern São Paulo and is among the most important historical collections in the interior of São Paulo.

The collection is particularly relevant in terms of objects (documents, manuscripts, photographs, furniture, weapons, clothing, etc.) related to the settlement, daily life, and economic activities of the region formerly called Sertão do Capim Mimoso, which comprises the area between the Pardo and Sapucaí rivers, in the middle of the Caminho de Goiás, that currently includes the city of Franca and the neighboring cities in the northwest of São Paulo and the southwest of Minas Gerais. The nucleus of objects from prominent personalities in the region, especially those who lived during the first half of the 20th century, and the special library, with complete collections of newspapers that circulated in Franca between 1881 and 1995, is equally interesting.

The museum's archive, open to the public, includes manuscript and printed sources from Franca's City Council and City Hall. The library is specialized in regional history and holds more than 2,000 book titles, 576 periodical volumes and 894 manuscript copies.

== See also ==
- Victor Dubugras
