= Guilherme de Almeida =

Brazilian lawyer, journalist, film critic, poet, essayist and translator

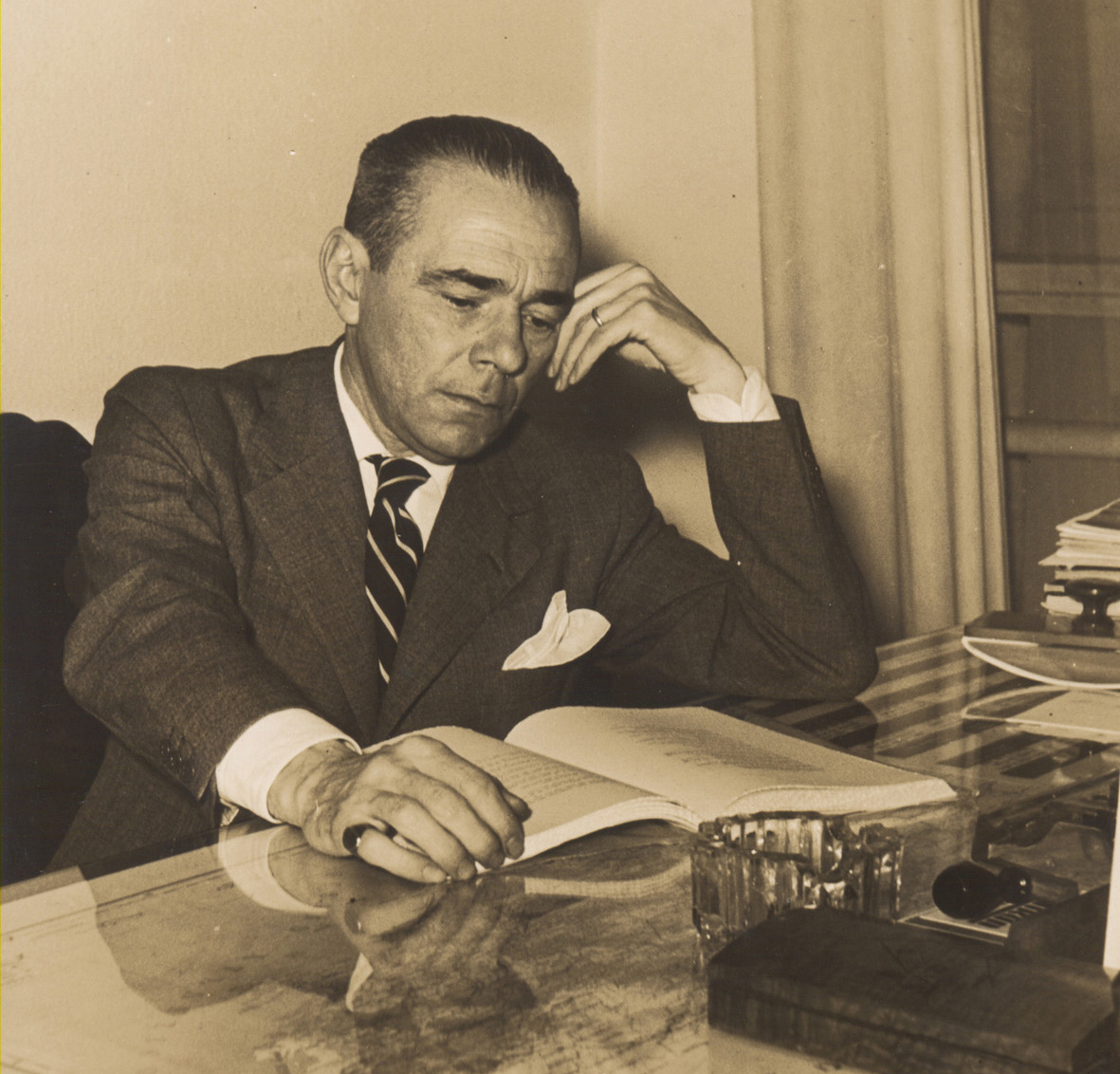

Guilherme de Andrade e Almeida (July 24, 1890 – July 11, 1969) was a Brazilian poet, lawyer, journalist, film critic, essayist and translator. He helped popularize the Japanese poem style, haiku, in Brazil.

== Biography ==
He was born in Campinas on July 24, 1890. He is the son of Estevão de Araújo Almeida, a law teacher and jurist, and Angelina Andrade Almeida.

He married Belkiss Barroso de Almeida, and they had a son, Guy Sérgio Haroldo Estevão Zózimo Barroso de Almeida, who married Marina Queiroz Aranha de Almeida.

He fought in the Constitutionalist Revolution of 1932. His greatest work of love to São Paulo was his poem, Nossa Bandeira (Our Flag), but he also wrote Moeda Paulista (São Paulo Coin) and the poignant Oração ante a última trincheira (Prayer at the last ditch"). He was proclaimed the Poet of the Revolution.

He also wrote the lyrics of the "Canção do Expedicionário" ("Song of the Expedicionarários", the 'expedicionários' were the members of the Brazilian Expeditionary Force in World War II), with music by Spartaco Rossi.

He died in São Paulo on July 11, 1969.
