= Militão Augusto de Azevedo =

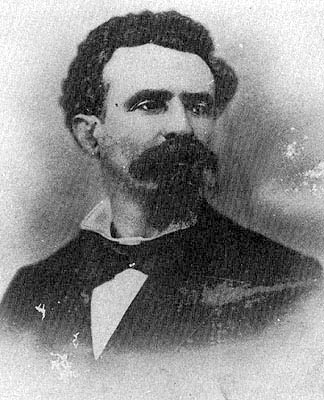
- Militão Augusto de Azevedo, 1887
- Born: June 18, 1837; Rio de Janeiro, Brazil
- Died: May 24, 1905 (aged 67); São Paulo, Brazil
- Occupations: Photographer, actor

Militão Augusto de Azevedo (Rio de Janeiro, 1837 — São Paulo, 1905) was a Brazilian photographer and actor active in the second half of the 19th century. Militão founded the Photographia Americana studio in 1875, where his clients included Castro Alves, Joaquim Nabuco, Dom Pedro II, and Empress Teresa Cristina. His rates were among the lowest in the city. The location of the studio in front of the Church of Our Lady of the Rosary, frequented mainly by the Afro-Brazilian residents, led to his photography of prominent Black citizens of Brazil. He depicted Afro-Brazilians not as slaves, but as ordinary citizens. His other works were of singers and theater artists.

A collection of more than 12,000 photos produced by Militão de Azevedo was acquired by the Roberto Marinho Foundation in 1996 and donated to the Museu do Ipiranga of the University of São Paulo.

== Life and career ==
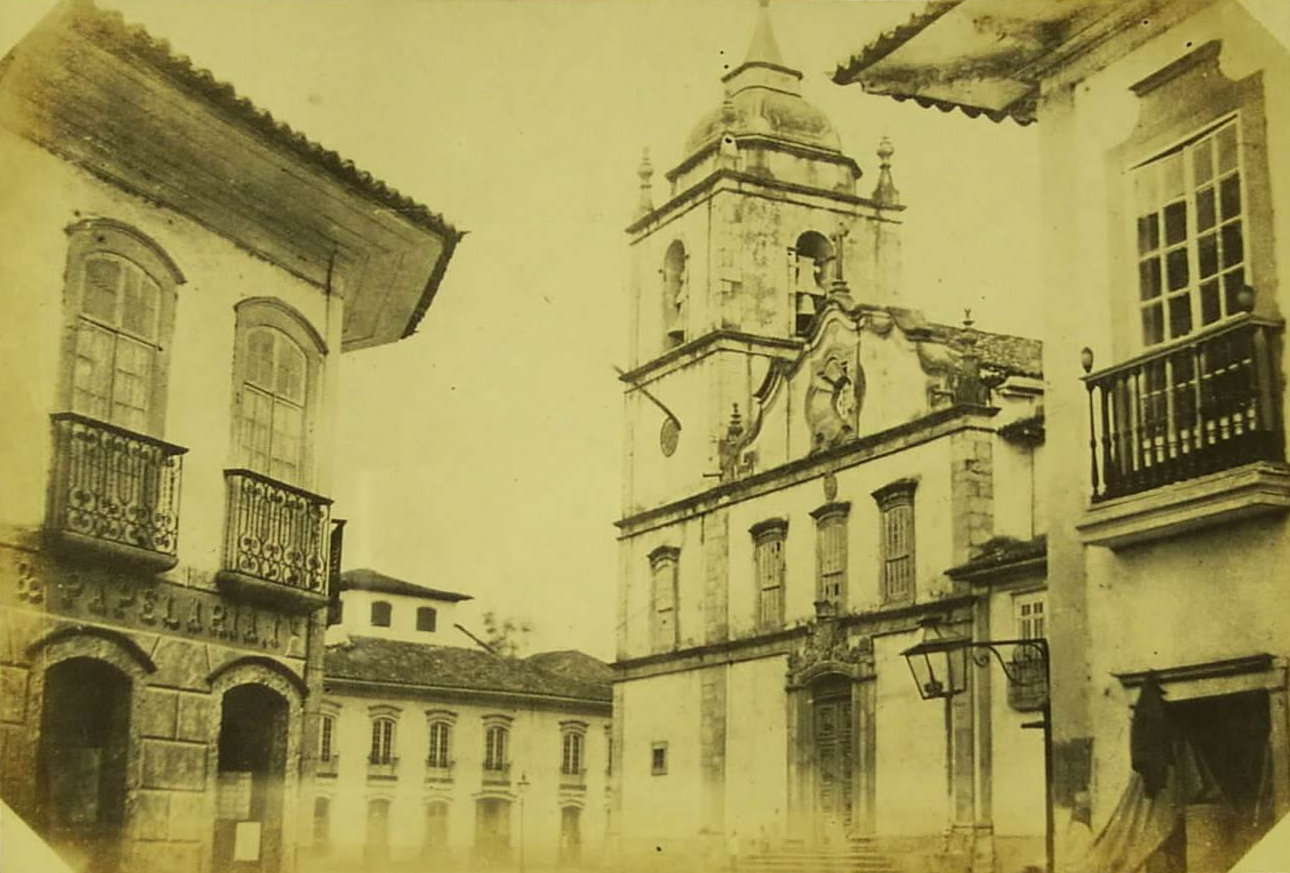
Sé District, approximately 1860

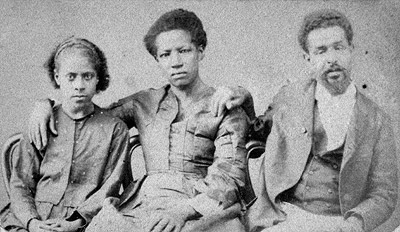
Anonymous family, ca. 1870

Militão Augusto de Azevedo was born in Rio de Janeiro on June 18, 1837. He began his career as a stage actor, participating in groups such as the Companhia Joaquim Heliodoro in 1858 and the Companhia Dramática Nacional in 1860. With this last group, he traveled to the city of São Paulo in 1862, where he moved in the same year and started a career as a photographer.

Militão pursued the careers of actor and photographer in parallel. He worked at the Companhia Joaquim Heleodoro (1858-1860) and at Companhia Dramática Nacional (1860-1862), with whom he moved to São Paulo at the age of 25. He became acquainted with the owners of the Carneiro & Gaspar studio in the 1850, and worked as a portrait artist for the partners. Militão's experience in the theater had an important influence on his style of photography. While other photographers of the time were dedicated to the largest market of the time, the portrait market, Militão exercised artistic and creative freedom in the choice of urban landscapes as the subject of work.

When he arrived in São Paulo in 1862, Militão found a "small and introspective closed nucleus immersed in numbing sameness". The capital had a provincial atmosphere, but it was bustling, full of energy, and activities focused on material achievements. It was in this context that Militão started his photographic work, documenting the population and their daily lives.

Militão acquired Carneiro & Gaspar in 1875 and changed it name to Photographia Americana. The studio has received numerous famous figures in its twenty years of operation. Despite this, the price charged for the photos was one of the cheapest in the city: five thousand réis. The studio was located in front of the Rosário church, frequented the Afro-Brazilian population of São Paulo; he photographed the Black population of the city as ordinary citizens rather than as slaves.

Militão worked mainly in São Paulo between 1862 and 1887, producing images of houses, farms, public buildings, streets and panoramic shots; and organized albums with some of these urban scenes. The photographer also made portraits during excursions to other cities, especially during annual festivals.

Some of his famous clients were the emperor, Dom Pedro II, the Empress Teresa Cristina, the jurist and politician Ruy Barbosa, the poet Castro Alves, the abolitionists Luís Gama and Joaquim Nabuco, Antônio de Lacerda Franco, José Maria Lisbon, Eduardo da Silva Prado, Friar Germano de Annecy and Rodolfo Amoedo.

Despite the increasing popularity of the photographic market in 1884, Militão facing serious commercial problems. He decided to put Photographia Americana up for sale in 1885, and auctioned off his furniture and equipment to travel to Europe. Despite disposing of the entire Photographia Americana laboratory and auctioning off photographic machines, materials and equipment, Militão kept the textual and iconographic documentation of the business. The collection was maintained by the family of his eldest son, Luiz Gonzaga de Azevedo, with whom the photographer maintained close ties until his death.

Probably influenced by the popularity of photographic albums featuring images of European cities, he produced similar albums focused on changes in the urban landscape of the city of São Paulo. He released Álbum Comparativo de Vistas da Cidade de São Paulo (1862-1887) in 1887, defined a model for urban landscape photography that focused on the comparison of urban landscapes between times. He Made other albums of the same kind, among them Vistas da Cidade de São Paulo (1863), Álbum de vistas da Cidade de Santos (1864-65), Álbum de vistas da Estrada de Ferro Santos Jundiaí (1868) and Álbum Comparativo de Vistas da Cidade de São Paulo (1862-1887).

Militão died on May 24, 1905, in São Paulo.

== Militão Augusto de Azevedo Collection at the Paulista Museum of the University of São Paulo ==
Militão Augusto de Azevedo Collection at the Paulista Museum of the University of São Paulo is made up of the documentation and office ephemera from Carneiro & Gaspar and Photographia Americana. It includes 12,000 portraits originally produced in the carte-de-visite and cabinet-portrait. The portraits are gathered in six leather bindings, with dates engraved on the spines, glued whole or cut out in order to identify only the customer's face.
