= Church of the Wounds of the Seraphic Father Saint Francis =

Catholic temple in São Paulo, Brazil

- Igreja das Chagas do Seráfico Pai São Francisco
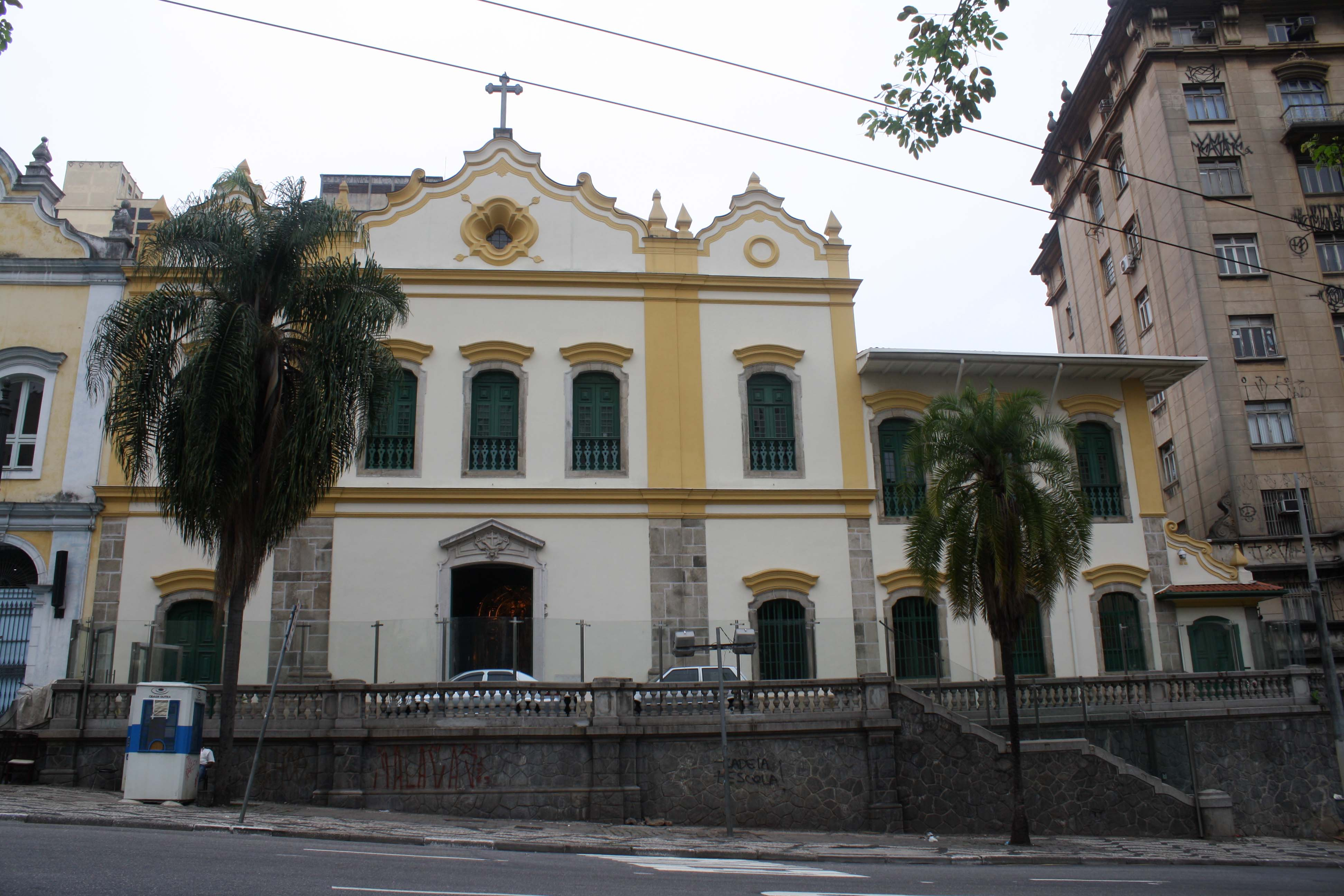
- Facade of the Church of the Wounds of the Seraphic Father St. Francis
- Church of the Wounds of the Seraphic Father Saint Francis
- 23°33′00″S 46°38′15″W
- Location: São Paulo, São Paulo; Brazil

Architecture
- Completed: 1797; 229 years ago

The Church of the Wounds of the Seraphic Father Saint Francis of the Venerable Third Order of Saint Francis of Penance of São Paulo (Portuguese: Igreja das Chagas do Seráfico Pai São Francisco da Venerável Ordem Terceira de São Francisco da Penitência de São Paulo), usually known as the Church of the Wounds of the Seraphic Father Saint Francis (Igreja das Chagas do Seráfico Pai São Francisco), is a colonial temple located in Largo de São Francisco, in the historic center of São Paulo, Brazil. Along with the Church of Saint Francis, it composes a very important element in the layout of the old São Paulo de Piratininga.

The building, inaugurated by the Third Order of Saint Francis in 1787, is the only architectural example remaining from the 18th century in the urban core of São Paulo. For this reason, it is considered an important historical-architectural document for reading and analyzing the city during the colonial period.

Like the exterior of the Church of the Third Order of Carmel, the facade of the temple was built by the Afro-Brazilian architect Joaquim Pinto de Oliveira, known as Tebas, who was born a slave in Santos.

== History ==
=== Colonial period ===
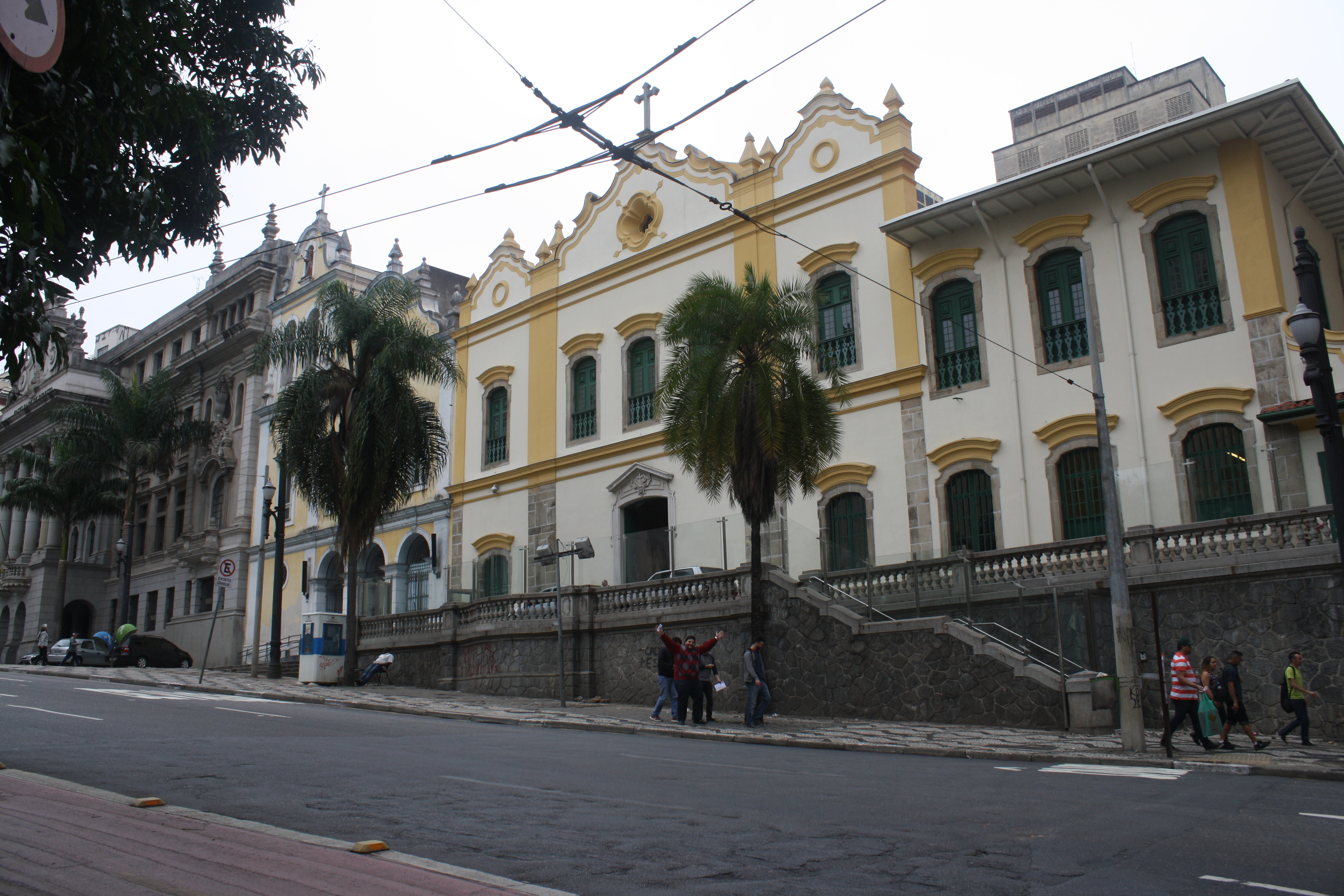
Facade of the Church of the Wounds of the Seraphic Father Saint Francis, in São Paulo, Brazil. On the left are the Church of Saint Francis and the Faculty of Law of the University of São Paulo, located in Largo São Francisco.

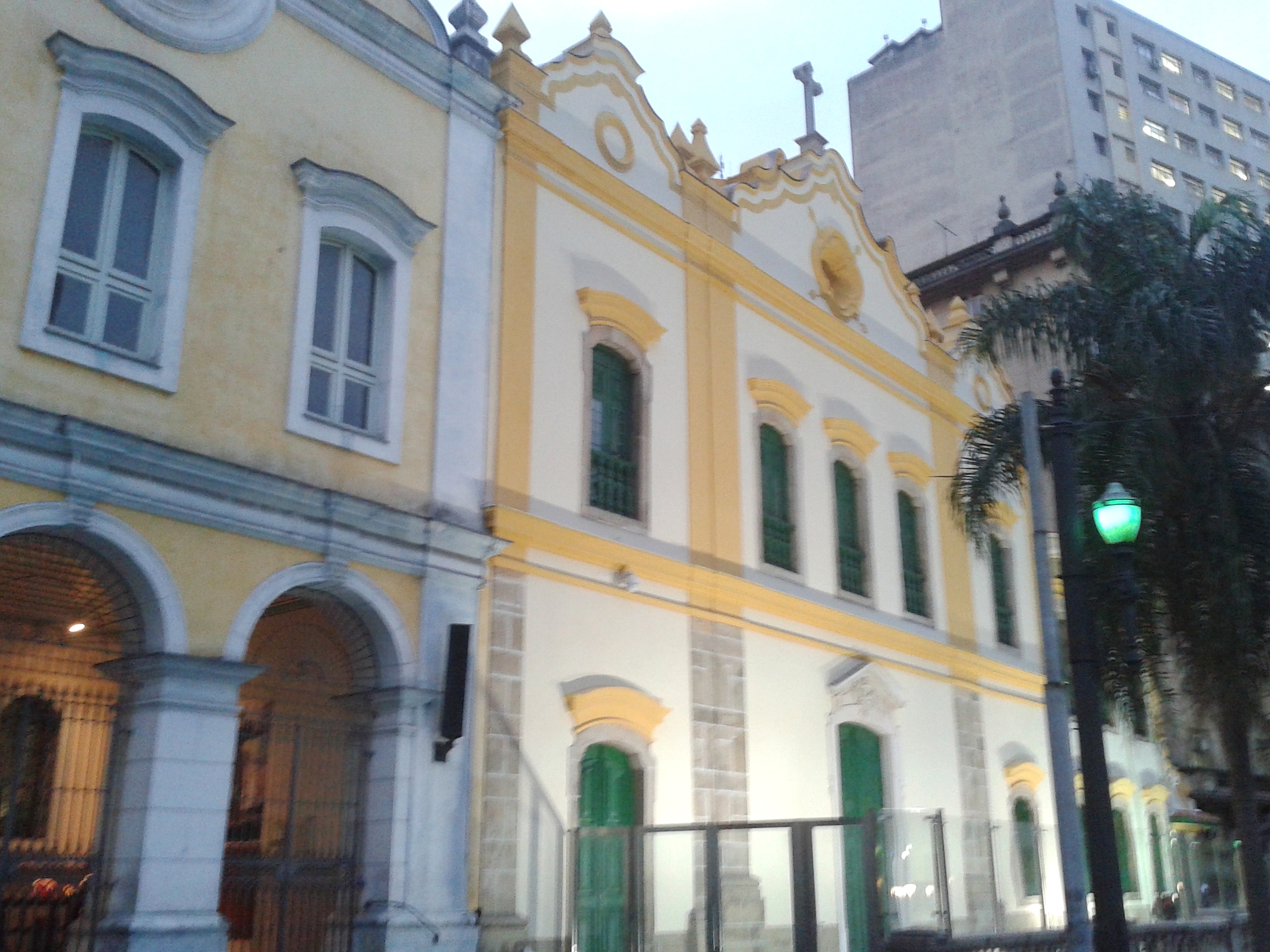
Facade of the Church of the Wounds. On the left-hand side of the picture you can see part of the facade of the Church of Saint Francis.

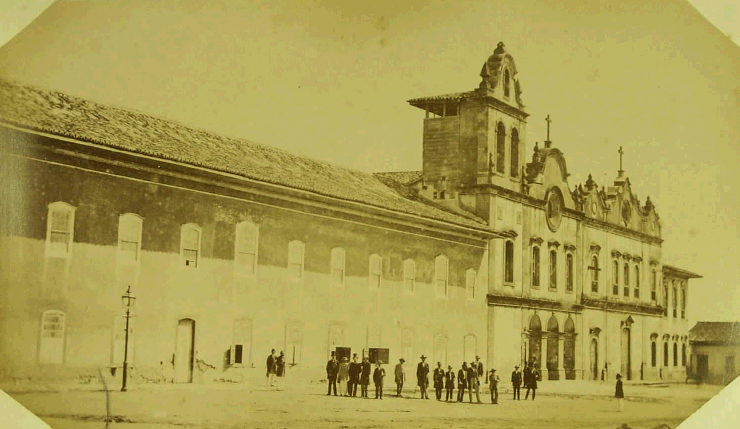
Convent (already converted into a college) and Churches of Saint Francis and the Wounds in 1862 (photo by Militão Augusto de Azevedo)

The Church of the Wounds of the Seraphic Father Saint Francis arose during the colonial period when the town of São Paulo de Piratininga was sparsely populated and its economic activity was linked to export trade, slave trade and subsistence agriculture. Social relations were limited to kinship ties, occupations and social goods.

The religious aspect was very important in the formation of Brazil's cultural identity, since it was the Catholic Church's responsibility, through the activities of the clergy, religious orders, brotherhoods and third orders, to occupy, educate, catechize and provide social assistance to the population.

=== Third Order ===
The expansion of the Seraphic Orders throughout Brazil began between 1624 and 1654, following the Dutch invasion of the country. In 1640, the Third Order of Saint Francis of Penance, belonging to Third Order of Saint Francis, was set in São Paulo. Over the course of the 18th century, the fraternity established itself as an institution, while the structure of society changed as a result of the gold cycle. During this period, the majority of the members of the Third Order were merchants and businessmen. From the beginning, the so-called "good men", who held public office and were part of the town's most important families, gathered in the church to share their ideas and interests.

=== Construction ===
Between 1642 and 1647, the Franciscan friars settled in the town of São Paulo do Piratininga and built a convent and church in the area later known as Largo de São Francisco. In 1676, the brothers of the Third Order of Saint Francis, led at the time by Friar João de São Francisco, began building a chapel for the congregation inside the Franciscan church to satisfy the spiritual needs of the local population. The chapel functioned as such for about a century, until the members of the Order decided to build a larger one without demolishing the existing building. The expansion of the chapel was completed in 1736 and included an archway connecting it to the convent church.

In 1783, the Franciscan friars donated the land around the temple to the brothers of the Third Order of Saint Francis for expansion. The octagonal chapel was transformed into the transept of the new church, which now has a cross-shaped plan with the main facade aligned with the convent church. On September 11, 1787, the Church of the Wounds of the Seraphic Father Saint Francis was inaugurated. The paintings on the dome and in the chapel date from the same period and are the work of artists such as João Pereira da Silva, José Patrício da Silva Manso, a painter known as Quadros, among other unknown artists.

=== Uses ===
Throughout the 19th and 20th centuries, the Church of the Wounds of the Seraphic Father Saint Francis maintained its functions and traditions. Every 8th of every month, masses are held in praise of Saint Anthony of Categeró, whose image has been venerated in this church for over 300 years. In addition, a large number of devotees attend the church every day.

== Architectural features ==
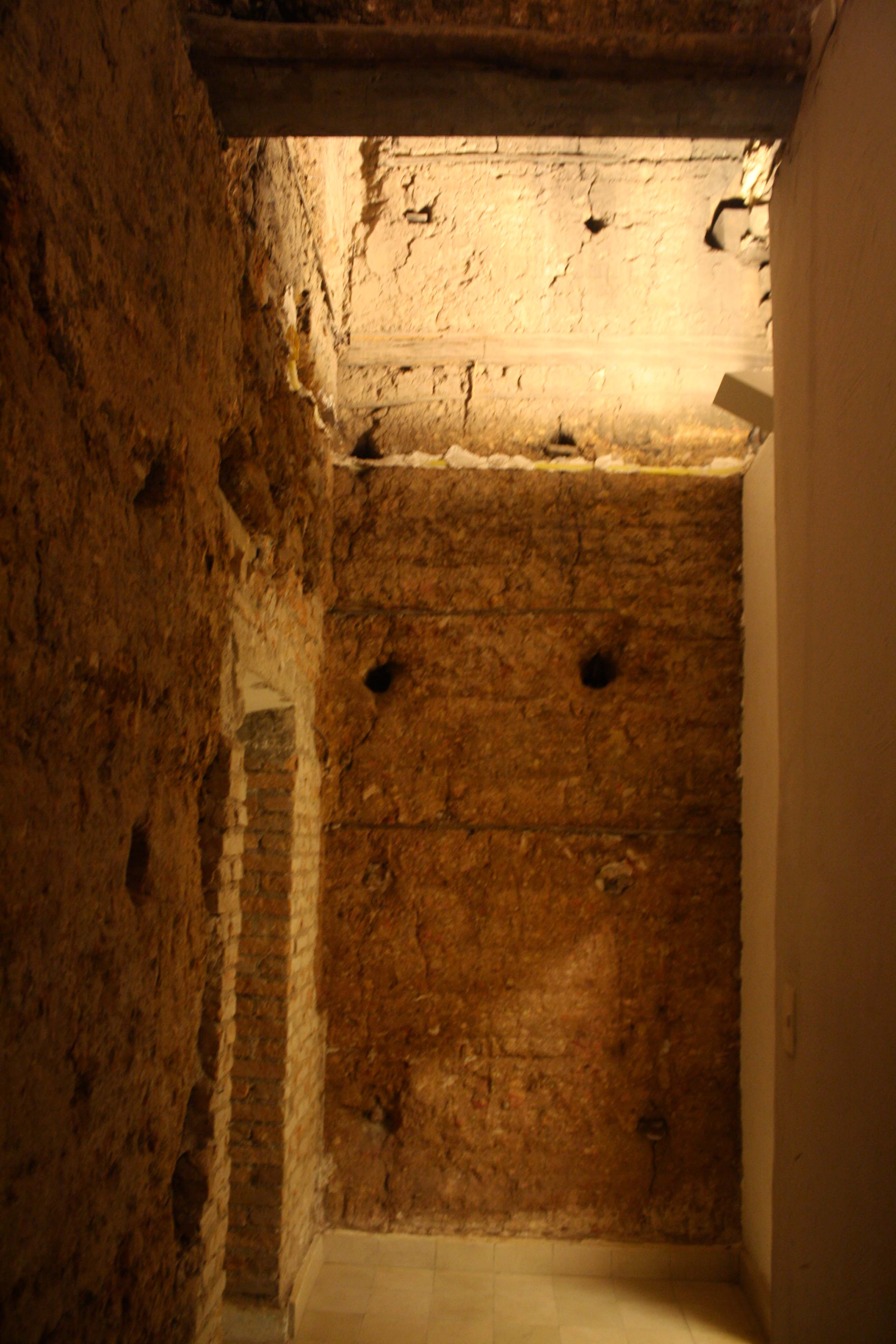
Details of the original construction using the rammed earth and wattle and daub technique.

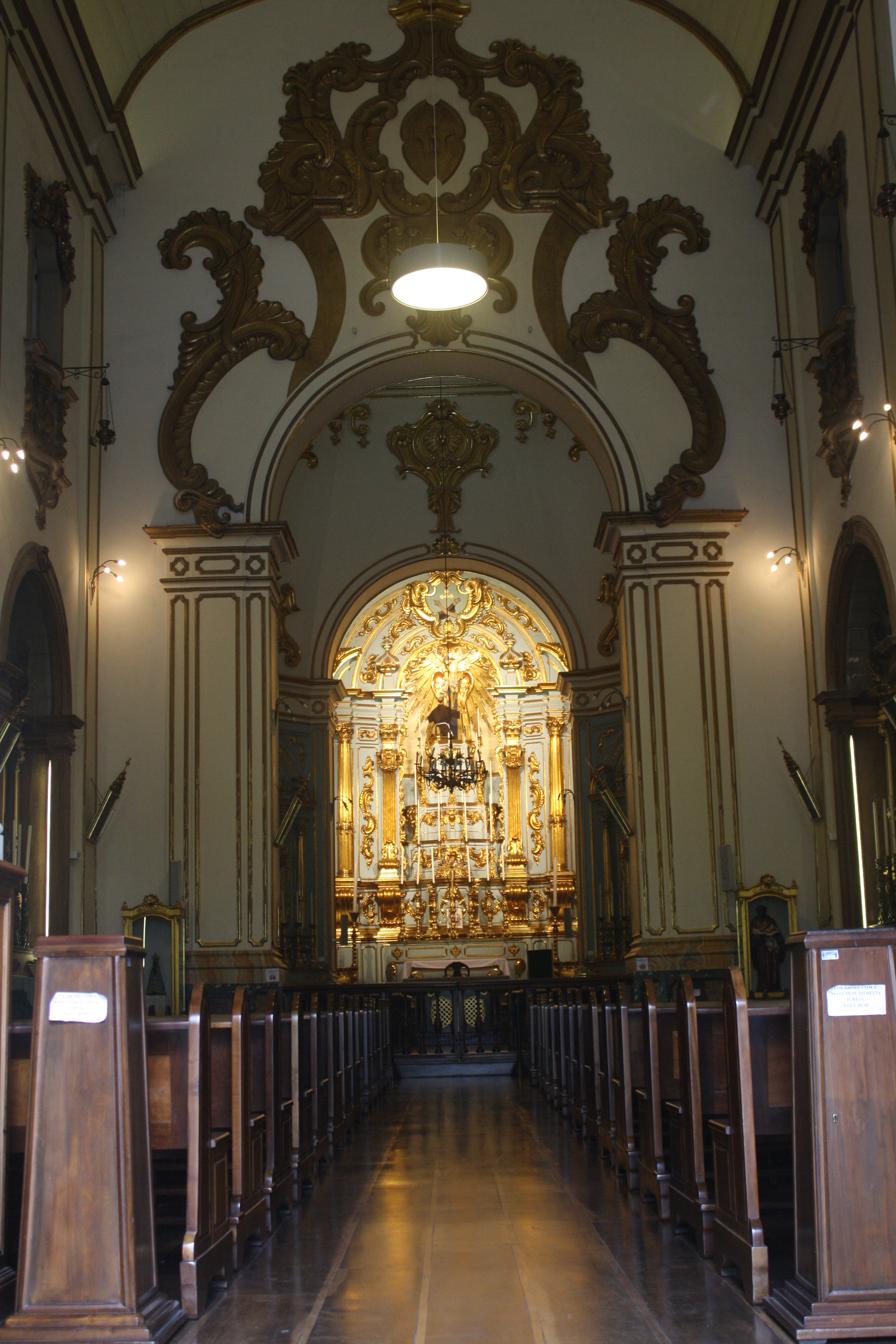
Front view of the interior of the church with the altar in the background.

The construction of the temple, made predominantly of rammed earth, with brick and wattle and daub walls executed with bamboo, dates back to the end of the 18th century. Initially, the Church of the Third Order consisted of a chancel and was enlarged as the brotherhood grew richer.

Inside, the transept area has an octagonal dome decorated with 18th century paintings and openings for abundant light, an altar dedicated to Saint Michael and another remarkable altarpiece dedicated to Immaculate Conception, made between 1736 and 1740 by the carver Luís Rodrigues Lisboa. The latter, an erudite carving in the Johannine style, has Atlantean angels supporting Solomonic columns, a novelty in São Paulo at the time. It also features other characteristics of the style, such as angels seated on volutes and a stepped throne under a sculptural ensemble of Saint Francis receiving the wounds, which was moved to the new main altarpiece, made in the Rococo style by José de Oliveira Fernandes in 1791, during the renovation at the end of the 18th century.

In addition to the altarpieces, the interior of the church houses the largest collection of paintings by José Patrício da Silva Manso. On the nave ceiling, paintings from 1790 to 1791 depict Saint Francis handing over the rule to the brothers of the Third Order of Saint Francis, while in the chancel, the roof was decorated between 1791 and 1792 with paintings depicting Saint Francis ascending to heaven in a chariot of fire.

=== Grave ===
The practice of burying important people inside churches was very common until the inauguration of the Consolação Cemetery in 1858. The remains of personalities such as Brigadier Rafael Tobias de Aguiar, patron of the 1st Riot Police Battalion, Francisco Antônio de Sousa Queirós, Ana Blandina da Silva Prado and Brigadier Luís Antônio can be found in the grave located in one of the rooms inside the Church of the Wounds of the Seraphic Father Saint Francis.

== Historical and cultural significance ==
The Church of the Wounds of the Seraphic Father Saint Francis is the only architectural example remaining from the 18th century in the urban core of São Paulo. For this reason, it is considered an important historical-architectural document for reading and analyzing the city during the colonial period.

Listing process number 00041/71, carried out by the Council for the Defense of Historical, Archaeological, Artistic and Tourist Heritage (Condephaat), was opened on September 4, 1971. Due to its historical value, the property was declared a landmark on April 19, 1982.

== Current state ==
=== Restoration ===
In 2007, the Church of the Wounds of the Seraphic Father Saint Francis was closed for restoration, carried out through an agreement between the State Government of São Paulo and the Archdiocese of São Paulo, along with the Third Order of Saint Francis of Penance of the City of São Paulo, the Ministry of Culture (through the Culture Incentive Law), the Institute of Democratic Culture (ICD) and Formarte. The temple was reopened after seven years on June 1, 2014, in a ceremony celebrated by Cardinal Dom Odilo Scherer, Metropolitan Archbishop of São Paulo.

The first phase of the restoration began in 2010 with an investment of R$1.5 million raised through the Cultural Incentive Law and involved work on the roof and floors of the first level, in which the original wooden structure was replaced by a new steel one. New glass roofs were installed in the upper gallery and on the first floor. In the second phase, which cost R$7.2 million released by the state government, decorative paintings, window frames and wall coverings were restored, and the altars and ceilings of the nave, the apse, the grave room and the Our Lady of the Conception and Saint Michael chapels were structurally rebuilt.

Other restoration work included wooden staircases, the choir, worship furniture, the cloister at the back of the church and stained glass windows, as well as new elements such as metal staircases, outdoor benches and a glass roof in the side recess. An asset security system and accessibility throughout the building were implemented, including the adaptation of toilets, the installation of elevators and soundproofing. The facade and the glass enclosure were restored by the Archdiocese, with incentives from the Rouanet Law and a project approved by the Council for the Defense of Historical, Archaeological, Artistic and Tourist Heritage (Condephaat).

=== Current uses ===
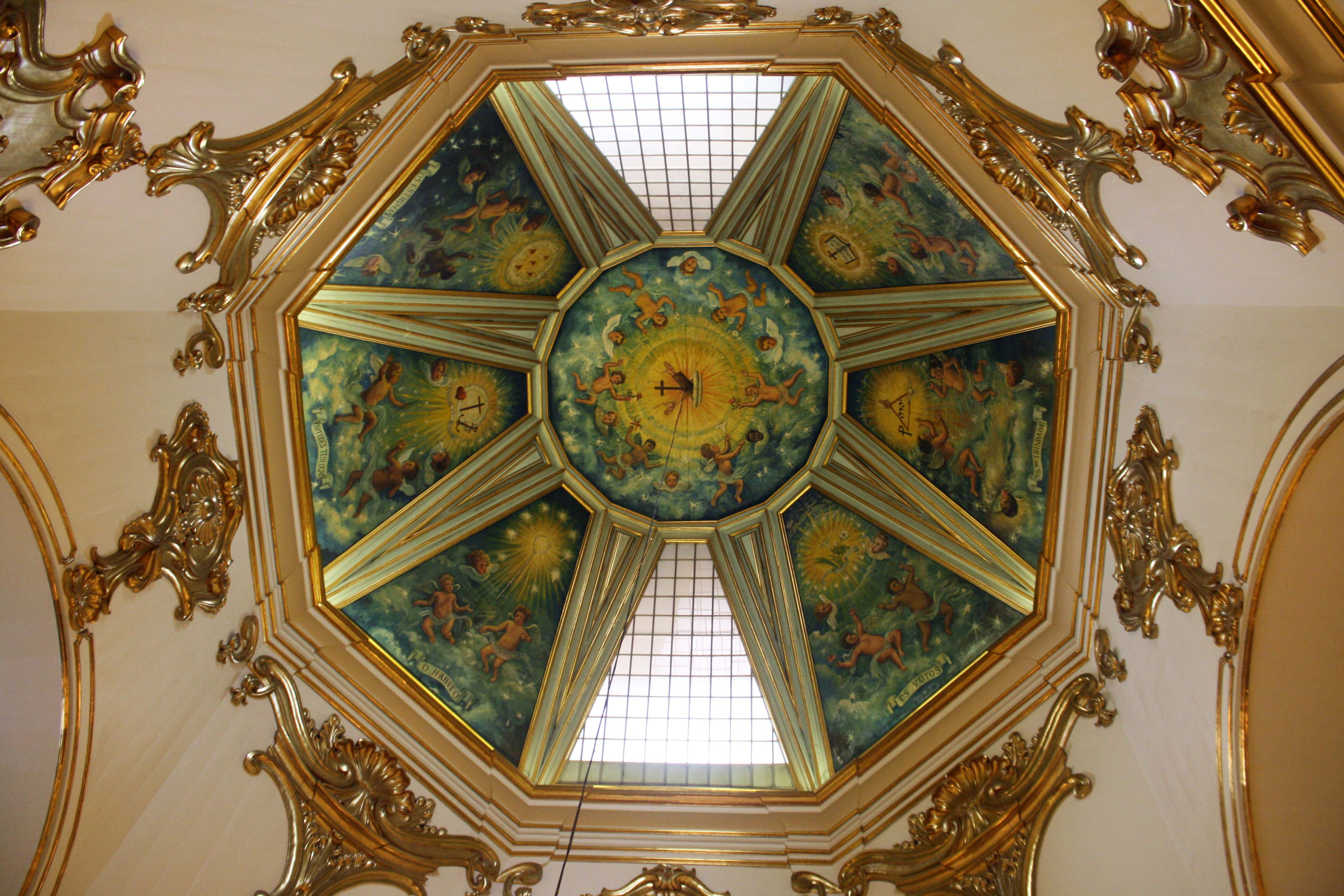
Detail of the dome on the church.

Masses are held on the first and third Sundays of each month. There are also masses in honor of Saint Anthony of Categeró, whose image has been venerated in this chapel for over 300 years, on the 8th of every month, in honor of Saint Ivo on the 19th of every month, and in honor of the Sacred Heart of Jesus on the first Friday of every month.

In the first half of 2015, the Banco do Brasil Cultural Center (CCBB) brought classical music to the Church of the Wounds of the Seraphic Father Saint Francis in a series of performances entitled CCBB Classical Music Concerts, which presented an eclectic repertoire. During the restoration period, several objects were found, such as canvases, altar collections, jewelry and sculptures. The discovery led to the creation of exhibitions of the fraternity's collection on the annexes of the church.

== Gallery ==
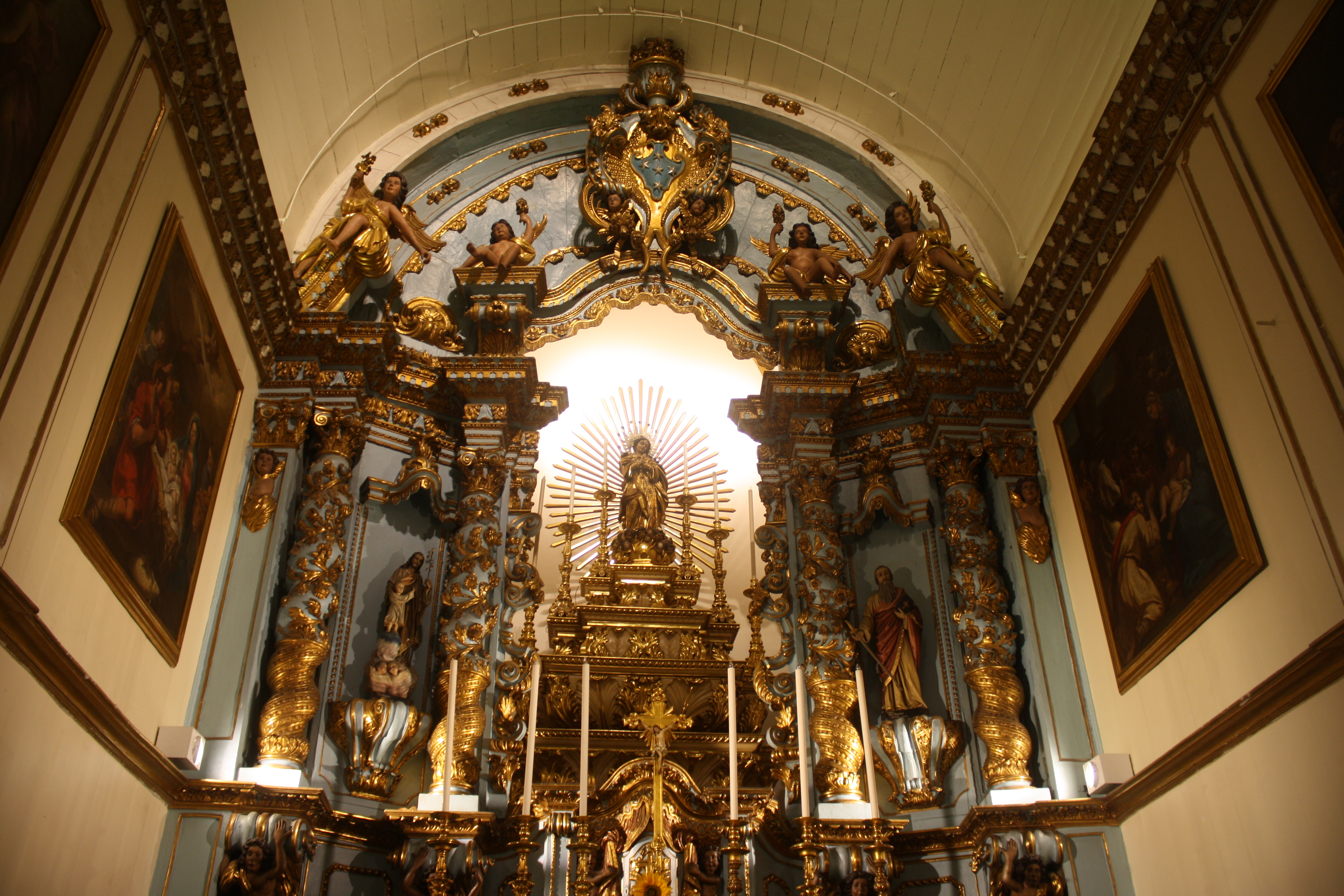
Detail of the right side of the church altar.

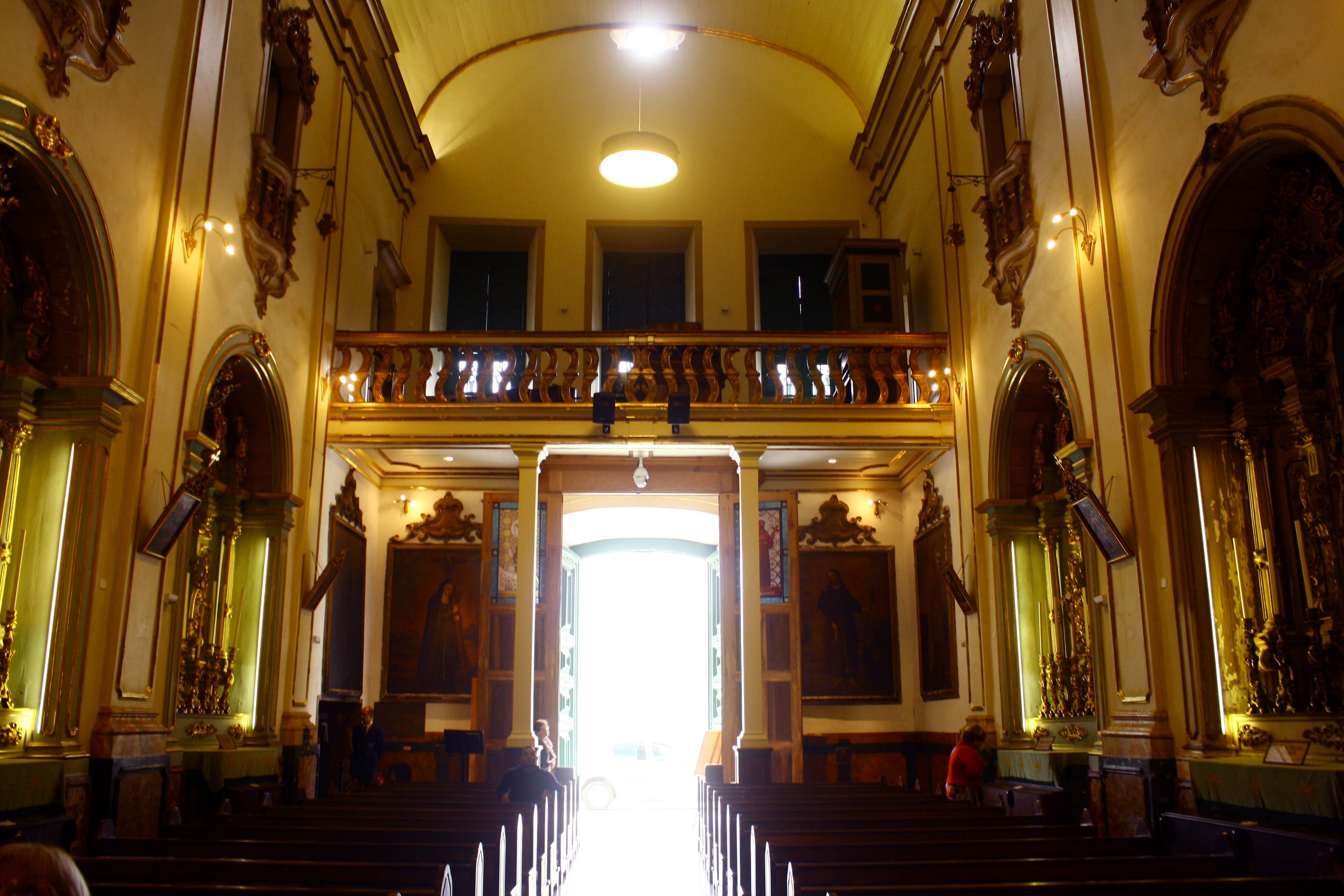
View of the church entrance.

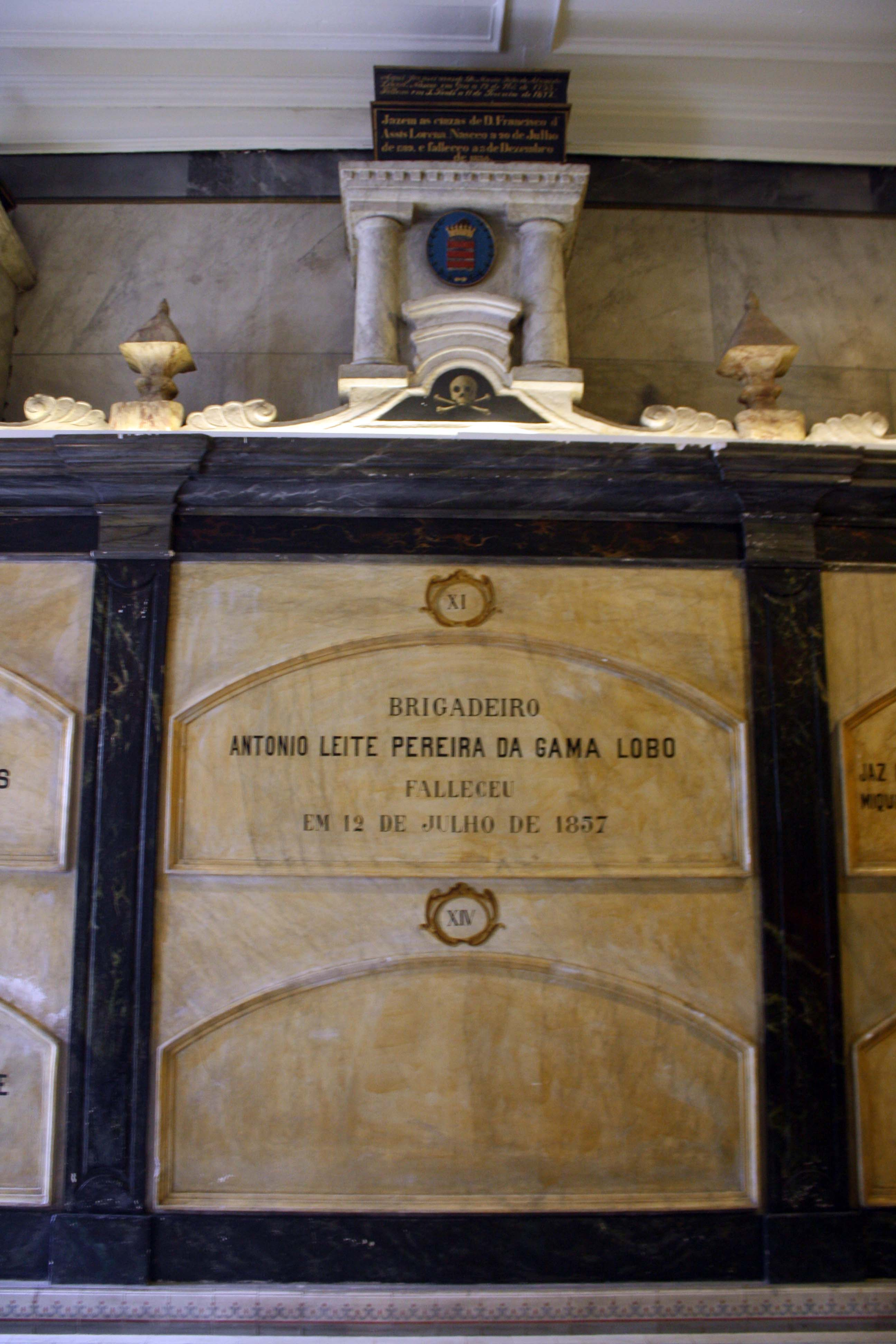
Detail of Brigadier Gama Lobo's grave.

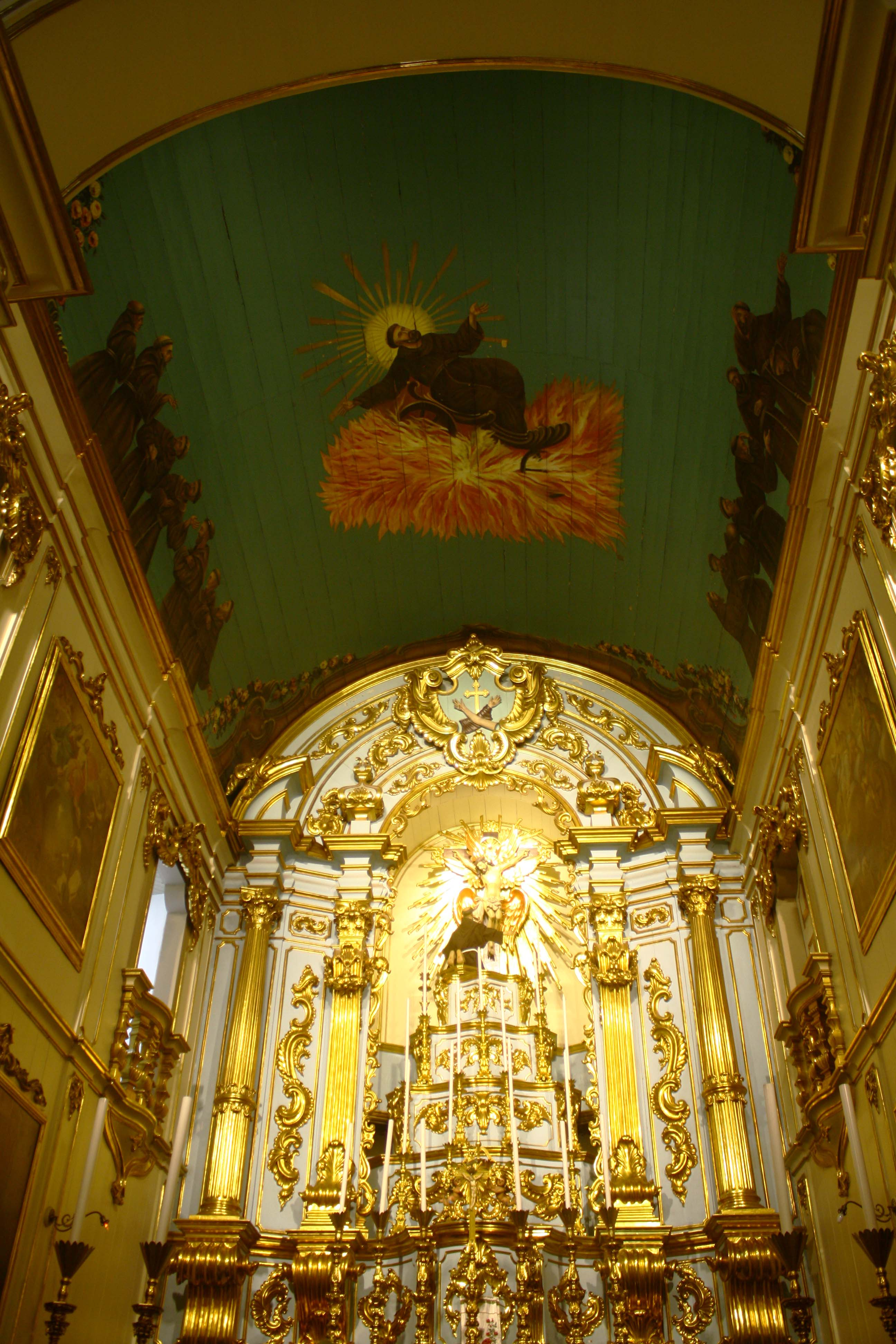
Detail of the altar ceiling.

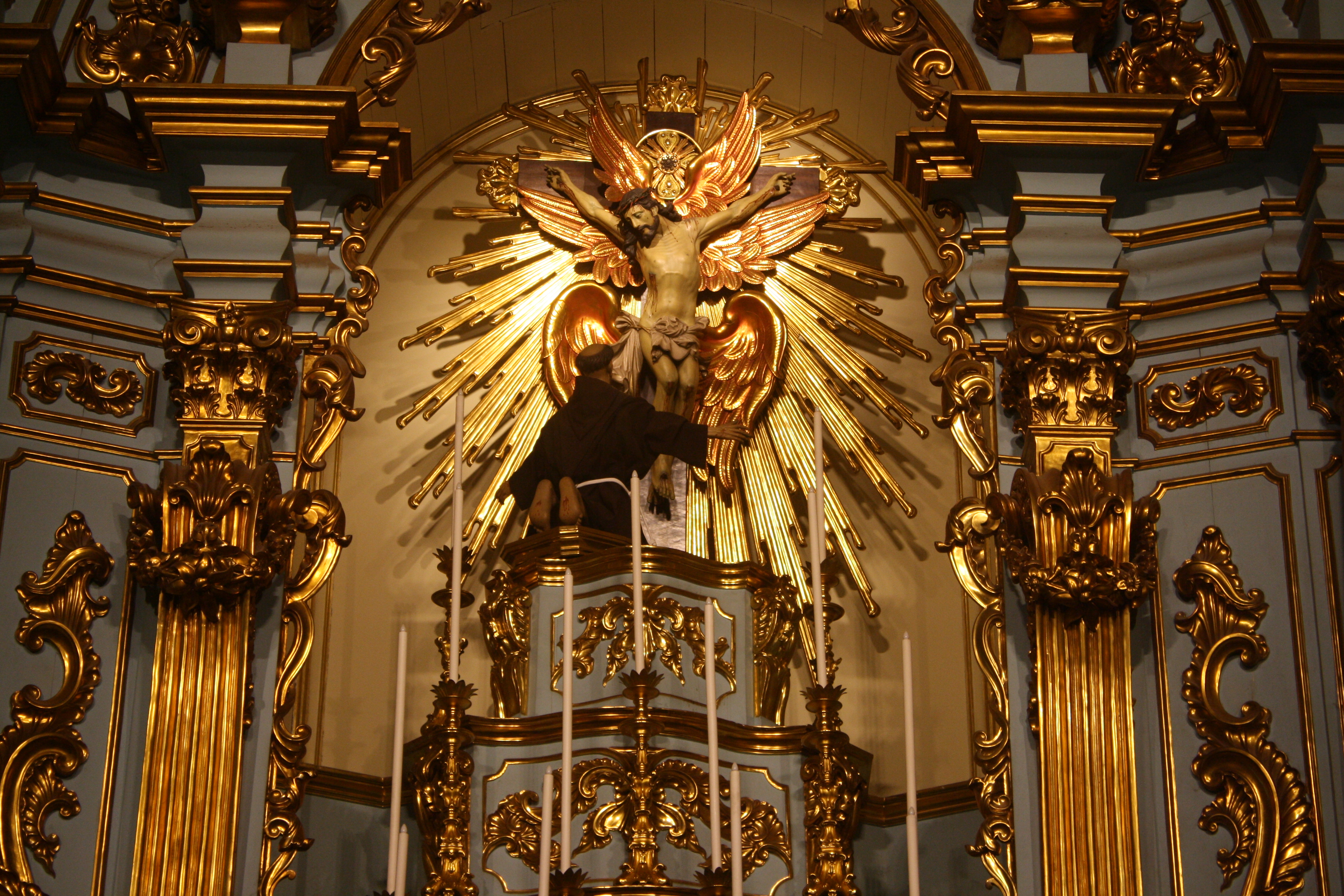
Detail of the altar: St. Francis receiving the Wounds.

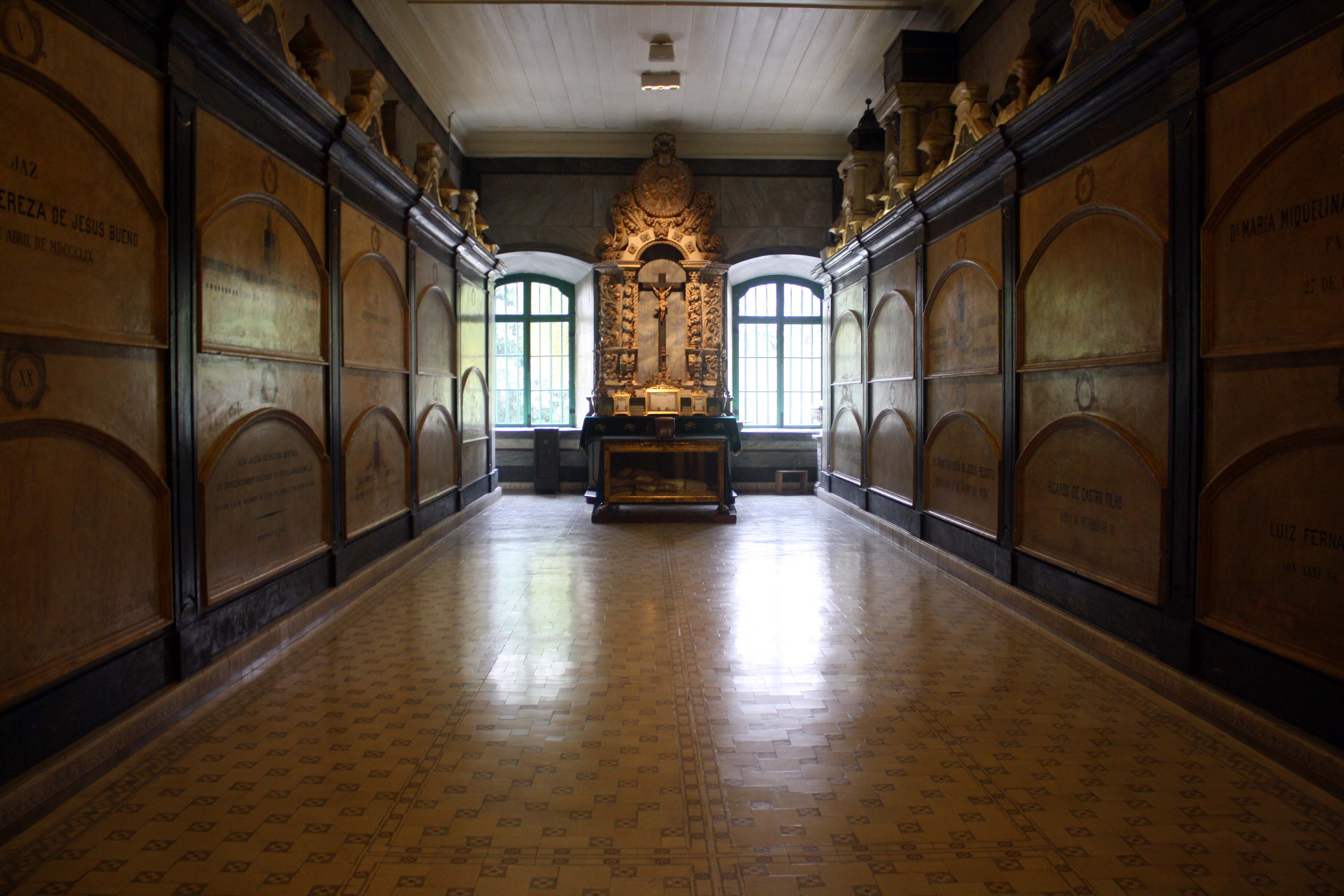
A grave located in one of the rooms on the side of the church.

== See also ==
- Tourism in the city of São Paulo
- Colonial architecture of Brazil
