= Tebas =

Tebas may refer to:

- Tebas (architect), Brazilian engineer, architect and stonemason
- Javier Tebas, Spanish lawyer and president of Liga Nacional de Fútbol Profesional
