= Igreja de Santo Antônio (São Paulo) =

Catholic Temple in São Paulo, Brazil

Church of Saint Anthony
- Igreja de Santo Antônio
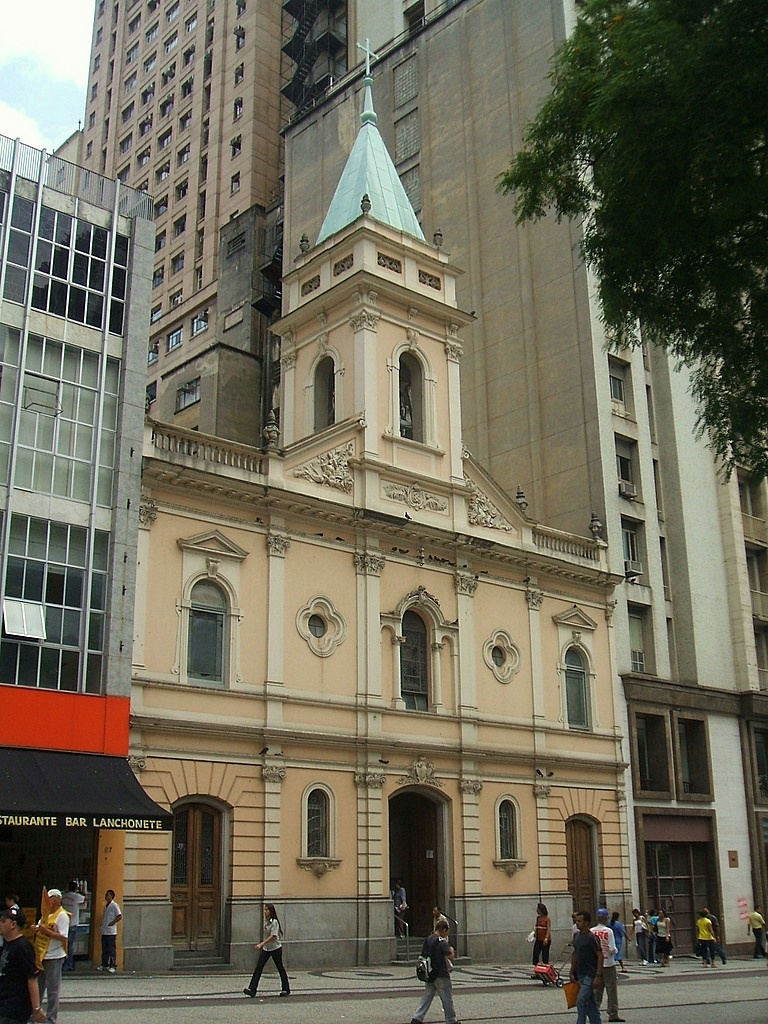
- Church of Saint Anthony
- 23°32′52″S 46°38′12″W
- Location: São Paulo, São Paulo; Brazil
- Country: Brazil
- Denomination: Roman Catholic

History
- Founded: 16th century

The Church of Saint Anthony (Portuguese: Igreja de Santo Antônio) is a Catholic temple located in Patriarca Square, in the center of the Brazilian city of São Paulo. Established in 1592, the current church was completed between 1899 and 1919. It housed the Franciscan Order in the 17th century and was subordinated to the Brotherhood of Our Lady of the Rosary of White Men in the 18th century. It is a historic monument of the state and the oldest remaining church in the city.

The interior of the church preserves important testimonies of the art produced in São Paulo during the colonial period. During the restoration work in 2005, the ceiling of the high altar revealed sixteenth-century mural paintings of high technical and artistic quality. In 1970, the building was listed as a landmark site by Council for the Defense of Historical, Archaeological, Artistic and Tourist Heritage (Conselho de Defesa do Patrimônio Histórico, Arqueológico, Artístico e Turístico - Condephaat).

== History ==
The founding date of the Church of Saint Anthony is uncertain. The oldest reference to the temple appears in Afonso Sardinha's will, dated November 1592, which bequeaths the sum of two cruzados for the "ermida de Santo Antonio" (English: chapel of Saint Anthony). It consisted of a small chapel erected by unknown worshippers at the end of the street now known as Direita Street.

In 1638, the chapel was renovated. The following year, the first friars of the Franciscan Order arrived in São Paulo from Rio de Janeiro and settled in the chapel. Despite the construction of their convent in Largo São Francisco between 1642 and 1647, the Franciscans continued to maintain the chapel. In 1717, with the help of devotees and Bishop Dom Bernardo Rodrigues Nogueira, the chapel was renovated again to expand the premises. Due to the increase in the size of the building, the chapel became a church.

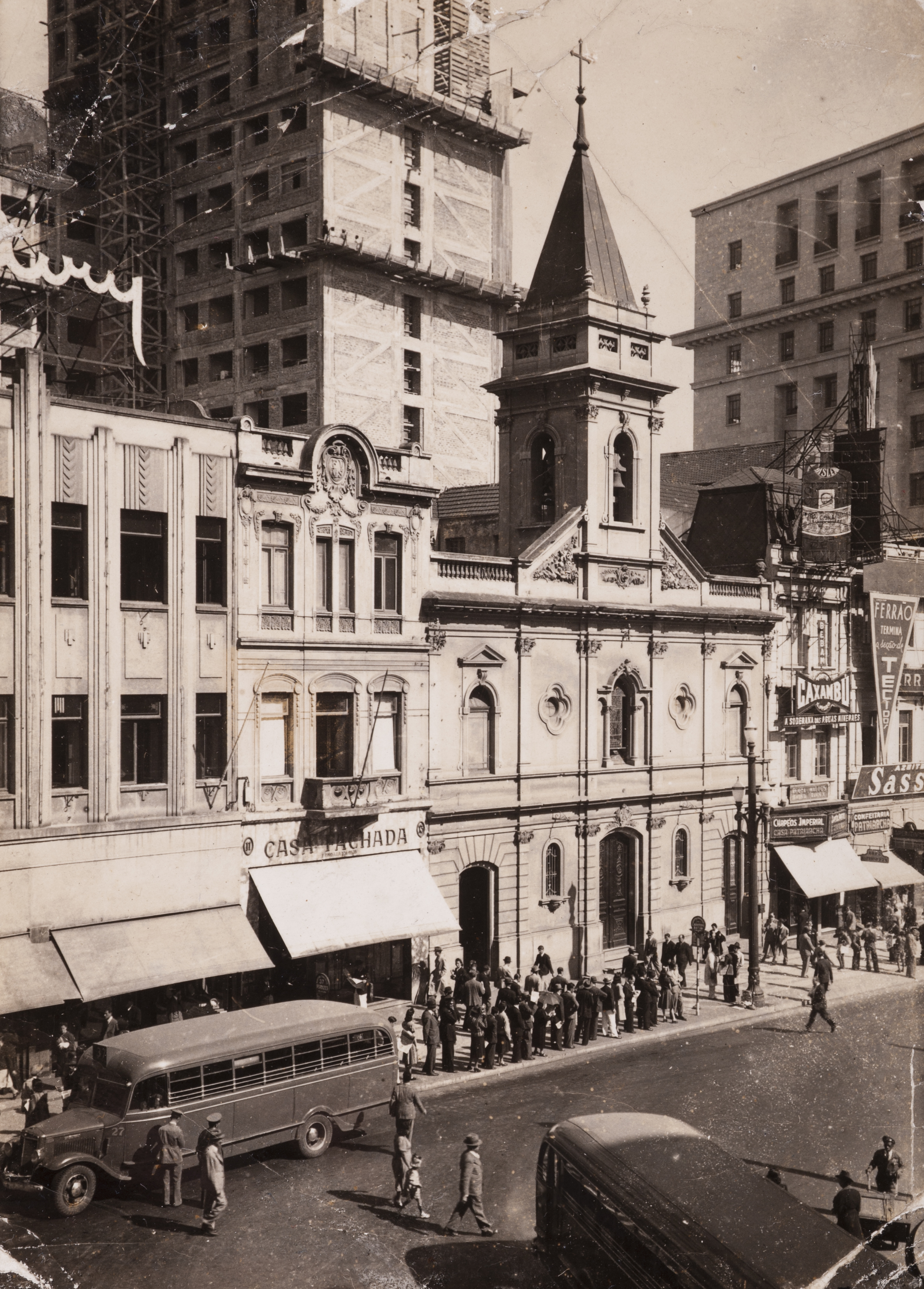
Patriarch's Square in a photograph by Werner Haberkorn.

In 1747, a third renovation began. In 1774, the Brotherhood of Our Lady of the Rosary of the White Men was founded, assumed administration of the church and transformed it into their headquarters. The confraternity carried out modifications that changed the features of the church's facade. In 1891, a fire in a neighboring building damaged and consumed part of the church. In 1899, the City Council ordered the brotherhood to demolish and rebuild the tower and facade due to the alignment works on Direita Street. The work was financed by Francisco Xavier Pais de Barros, the Baron of Tatuí, and the Count of Prates, who both lived near the church before the Viaduto do Chá was built. The work lasted several years and included a general refurbishment of the church, which reopened with a new eclectic-style facade in 1919.

Although the interventions made over the centuries have de-characterized the artistic and architectural integrity of the church, the Church of Saint Anthony was registered as a landmark site by the Council for the Defense of the Historical, Archaeological, Artistic and Tourist Heritage of the State of São Paulo (Conselho de Defesa do Patrimônio Histórico, Arqueológico, Artístico e Turístico - Condephaat) in 1970 due to its historical importance. In 1991, another fire damaged the back of the building.

== Conservation and restoration ==
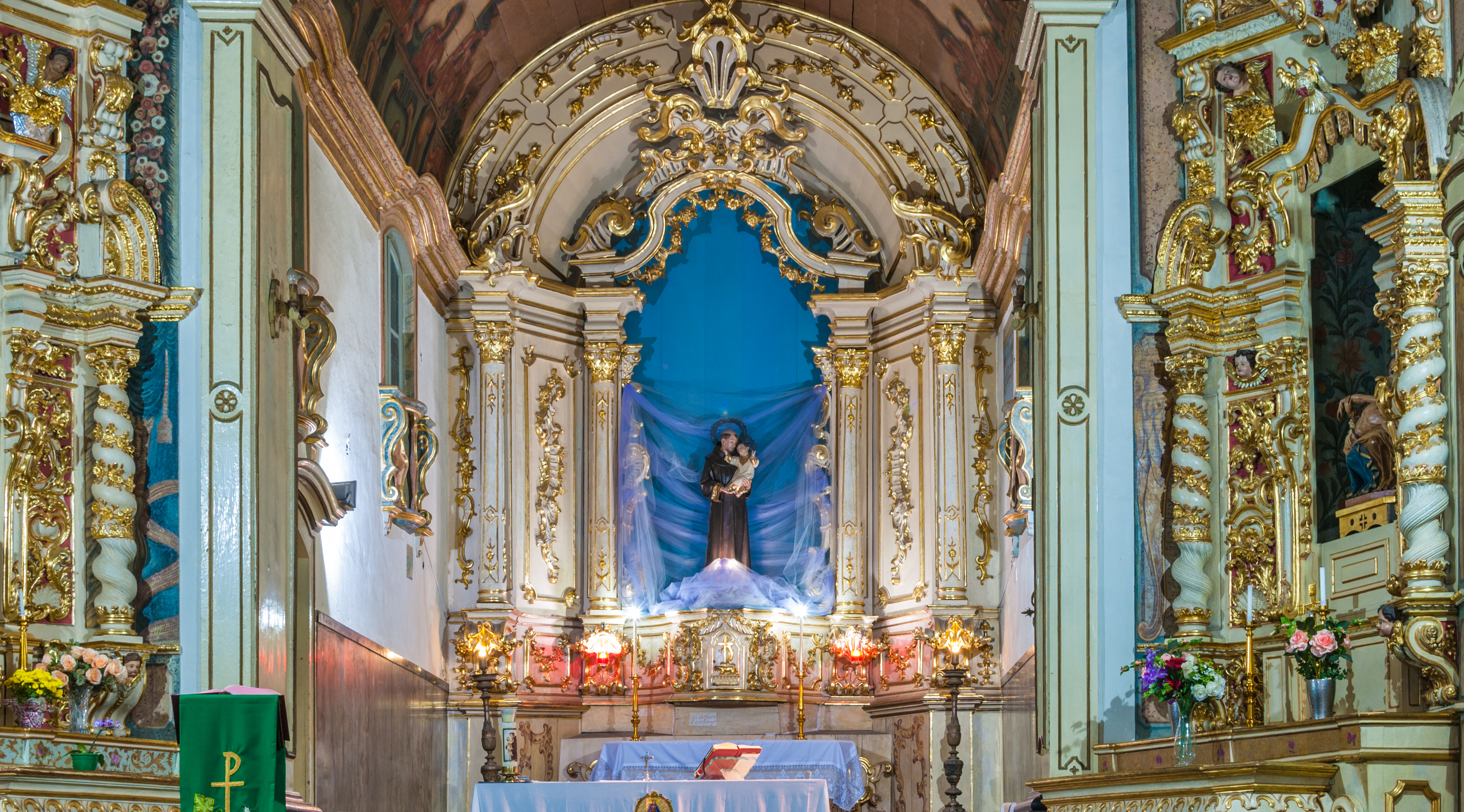
High altar of the church.

Restoration work began in January 2005. During the repairs on one of the side altars, interventions from different eras were identified, such as layers of paint and overlapping carvings, which covered up the altar's original paintings. The 20th century carvings were removed and the 17th century paintings depicting angels were renovated. Now, the altar displays the colors used in the Baroque of São Paulo, such as red, yellow and gold. After examining the ceiling of the high altar, a 17th-century painting that had survived the fires of 1891 and 1991 was discovered. The layers of paint covering it were removed and the picture was repaired.

In 2019, the first complete restoration of the church began. The project includes the renovation of the foundations, the electrical and plumbing systems, the bells in the tower and the interior of the building. The wooden ceiling, stained glass windows, floors and facade will also be recovered.

== See also ==
- Tourism in the city of São Paulo
