= Church and Convent of Saint Francis (São Paulo) =

Catholic temple in São Paulo, Brazil

- Igreja e Convento de São Francisco
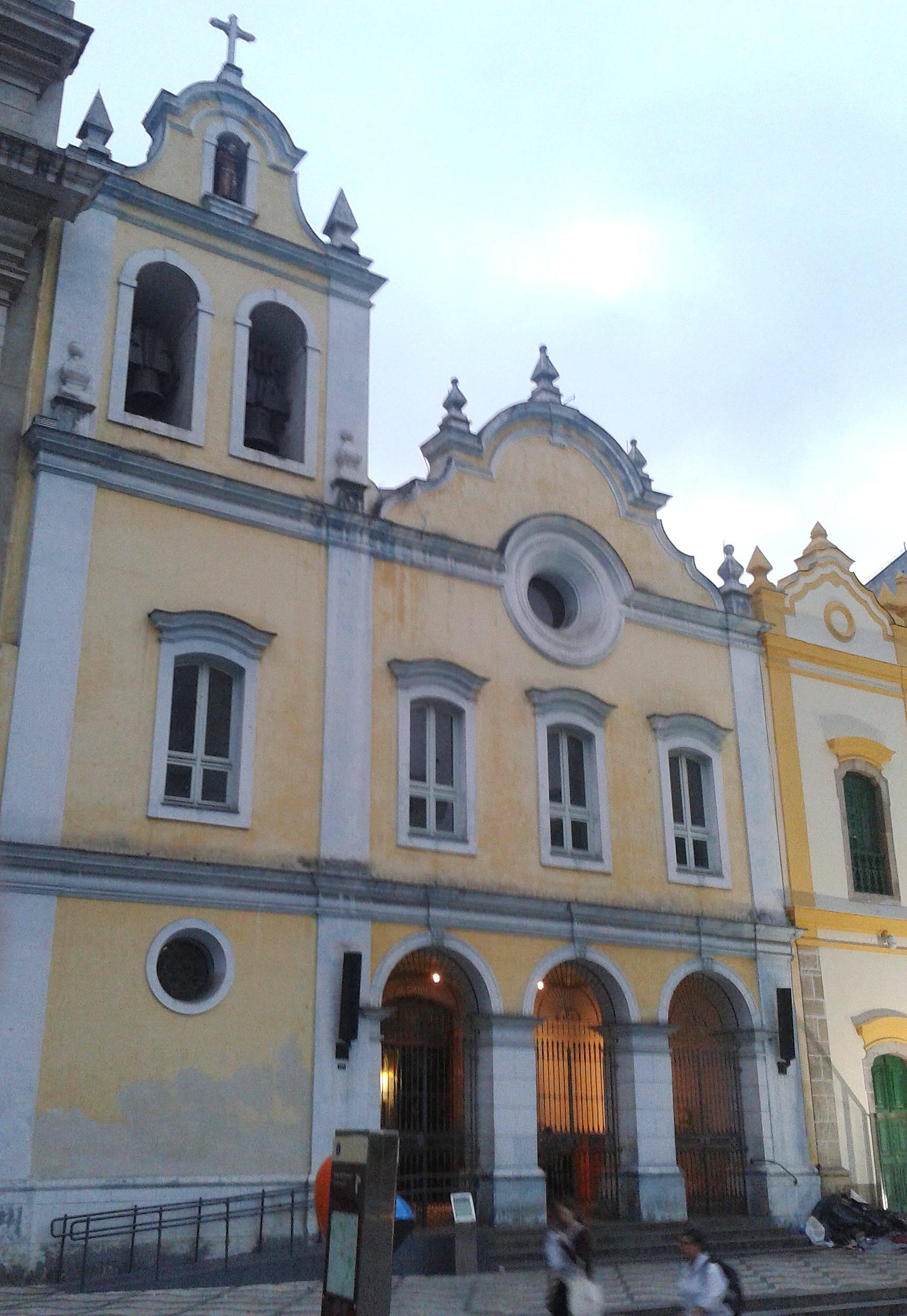
- Facade of the Church of Saint Francis of Assisi

- 23°32′59″S 46°38′14″W
- Location: São Paulo, São Paulo; Brazil

History
- Founded: 1643; 383 years ago

Architecture
- Architectural type: Baroque

Administration
- Archdiocese: Archdiocese of São Paulo

The Church and Convent of Saint Francis was a religious institution installed in the town of São Paulo during colonial Brazil. In the 19th century, the convent was converted into a Law School. The Church of the Wounds of the Seraphic Father Saint Francis, built by the Secular Franciscan Order, is next to it.

The ensemble formed by the Law School and the two churches has great historical value and is situated in Largo de São Francisco, in the Historic Center of São Paulo.

== History ==
In 1639, the friars of the Franciscan Order came to São Paulo from Bahia and initially settled in the Church of Saint Anthony. However, the place was considered unhealthy and, after a request to the City Council in 1642, the friars moved to a plot of land located on one of the edges of the hill where the town was founded. On this site, in the current Largo de São Francisco, they built their convent, which was inaugurated on September 17, 1647.

The convent church was extensively modified in the mid-18th century in order to achieve the Baroque style, with a single nave and two Baroque carved altarpieces in the transept. Also noteworthy is the rosewood choir stalls. At the end of the 19th century, the church and adjoining convent were badly damaged in a fire. At that time, a new altarpiece, bought in Germany, was installed on the high altar. The curved wooden ceiling of the nave has paintings on the life of St. Francis dating from 1953, reworked from those destroyed in 1880.

=== Church of Saint Francis ===
Located in Largo de São Francisco, it is owned by the Order of Friars Minor. It is situated next to the Church of the Wounds of the Seraphic Father Saint Francis and the Law School of the University of São Paulo. In 1982, the church became a registered heritage site.

=== Chapel of the Third Order ===
In 1676, the brothers of the Secular Franciscan Order began building a chapel for the order inside the Franciscan church. Inaugurated in 1787, the chapel was gradually expanded until it became an independent temple, with its facade attached to the convent church.

=== Law School ===
In the 1820s, the Franciscans abandoned the convent building because it was required by the imperial government to house the Academy of Social and Legal Sciences, now the Law School of the University of São Paulo. In 1933, the building was demolished for the construction of a new facility in the neo-colonial style, designed by Ricardo Severo.

== Gallery ==
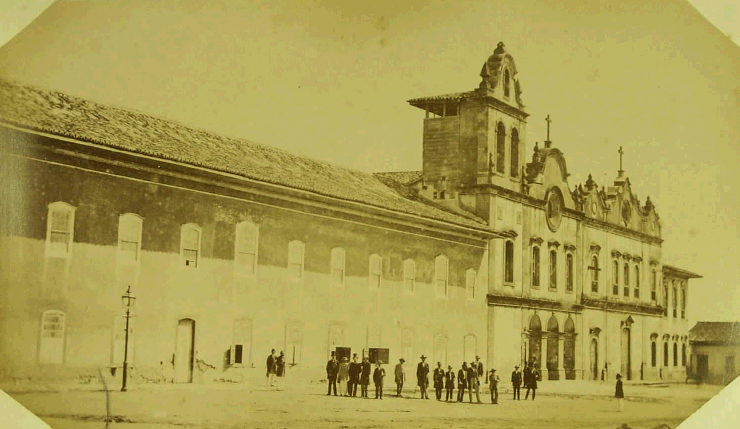
Convent (now converted into a college) and Churches of St. Francis and the Third Order in 1862.

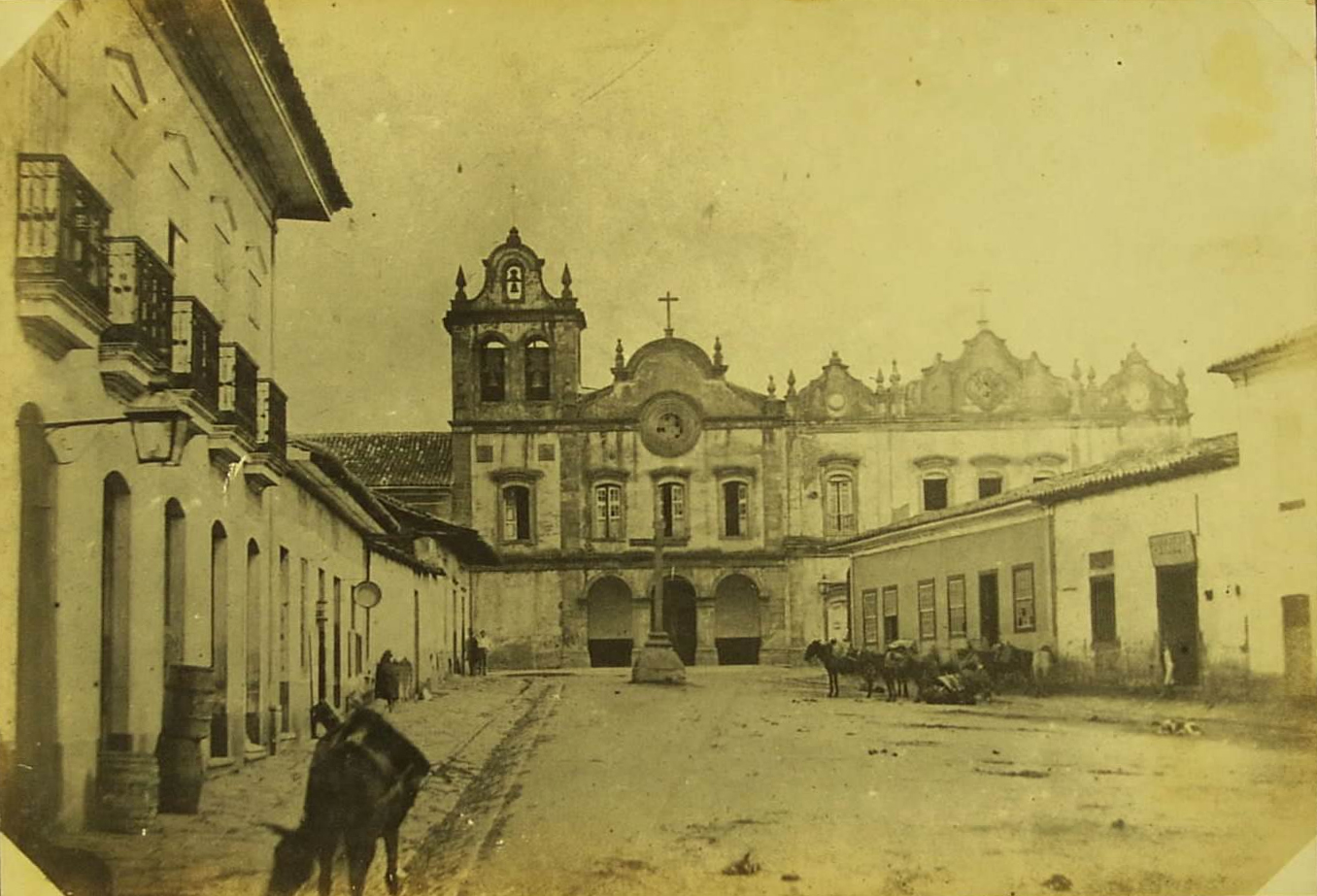
Militão Augusto de Azevedo: View towards Largo de São Francisco, São Paulo.

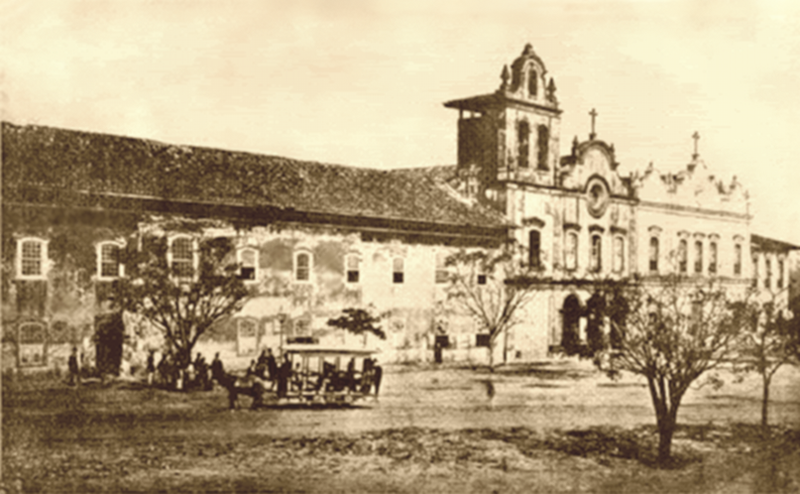
Law School of Largo de São Francisco, around 1860.

== See also ==
- Largo de São Francisco
- Tourism in the city of São Paulo
