= Igreja da Ordem Terceira do Carmo (São Paulo) =

Catholic Temple in São Paulo, Brazil

Church of the Third Order of Mount Carmel
- Igreja da Ordem Terceira do Carmo
- Capela da Venerável Ordem Terceira do Carmo (Chapel of the Venerable Third Order of Mount Carmel); Capela dos Terceiros do Carmo (Chapel of the Third Order of Mount Carmel)
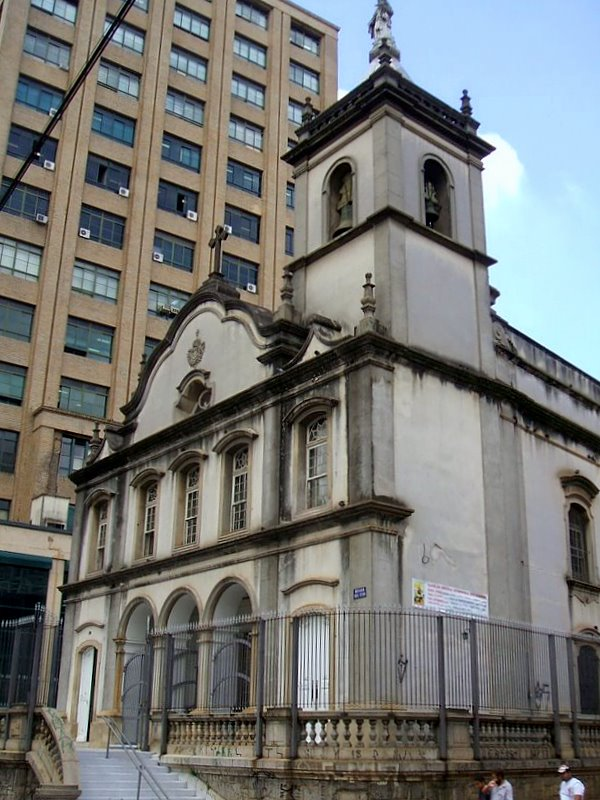
- Front view of the church
- Church of the Third Order of Mount Carmel
- 23°33′0″S 46°37′53″W
- Location: São Paulo, São Paulo; Brazil
- Country: Brazil
- Denomination: Roman Catholic

Architecture
- Completed: 18th century

Administration
- Archdiocese: Archdiocese of São Paulo

Igreja da Ordem Terceira do Carmo (English: Church of the Third Order of Mount Carmel) also known as the Capela da Venerável Ordem Terceira do Carmo (Chapel of the Venerable Third Order of Mount Carmel) or the Capela dos Terceiros do Carmo (Chapel of the Third Order of Mount Carmel), is located in São Paulo, Brazil. It was founded in the second half of the 17th century by a group of laypeople as an adjacent chapel to the Convento do Carmo de São Paulo (Convent of Mount Carmel of São Paulo), which opened in 1592 and was demolished in 1928.

The current building was constructed on rammed earth between 1747 and 1758. From 1772 to 1802, it was enlarged and added a new frontispiece designed by Joaquim Pinto de Oliveira. In 1929, it underwent an extensive renovation and was partially rebuilt.

The Church of Mount Carmel displays a collection of São Paulo's colonial art, including paintings on the chancel and choir ceilings by Friar Jesuíno do Monte Carmelo, an 18th-century rococo altar and panels from the demolished Recolhimento de Santa Teresa. It is listed as a heritage site by IPHAN and CONPRESP.

== History ==
There are three orders inspired by Mount Carmel: the First, represented by those who dedicate themselves to religious life and the rules of monastic life; the Second, which concerns women who dedicate themselves to religious service and remain chaste throughout their lives; and the Third, those who don't wear the habit or fulfill the obligations of religious.

The date of the foundation of the Third Order of Our Lady of Mount Carmel in São Paulo is unknown but is estimated to have occurred in the 16th century, shortly after the establishment of Carmelite friars in the town. In 1592, the Third Brothers, as the members of the Third Order of Mount Carmel were called, were received by the friars and began to share the space of the church and convent to carry out their spiritual practices.

=== First chapel ===
According to reports, the chapel of the Third Order of Our Lady of Mount Carmel began to be built in 1676, when Brother Prior transferred the money collected from the confreres in Rio de Janeiro to begin the construction. In October 1691, the structure of the temple was erected next to the nave of the friars' church. As of 1692, the Third Brothers performed their spiritual practices in their own chapel. The building functioned until the middle of the 18th century, when they decided to construct a new one on October 15, 1747.

=== New chapel ===
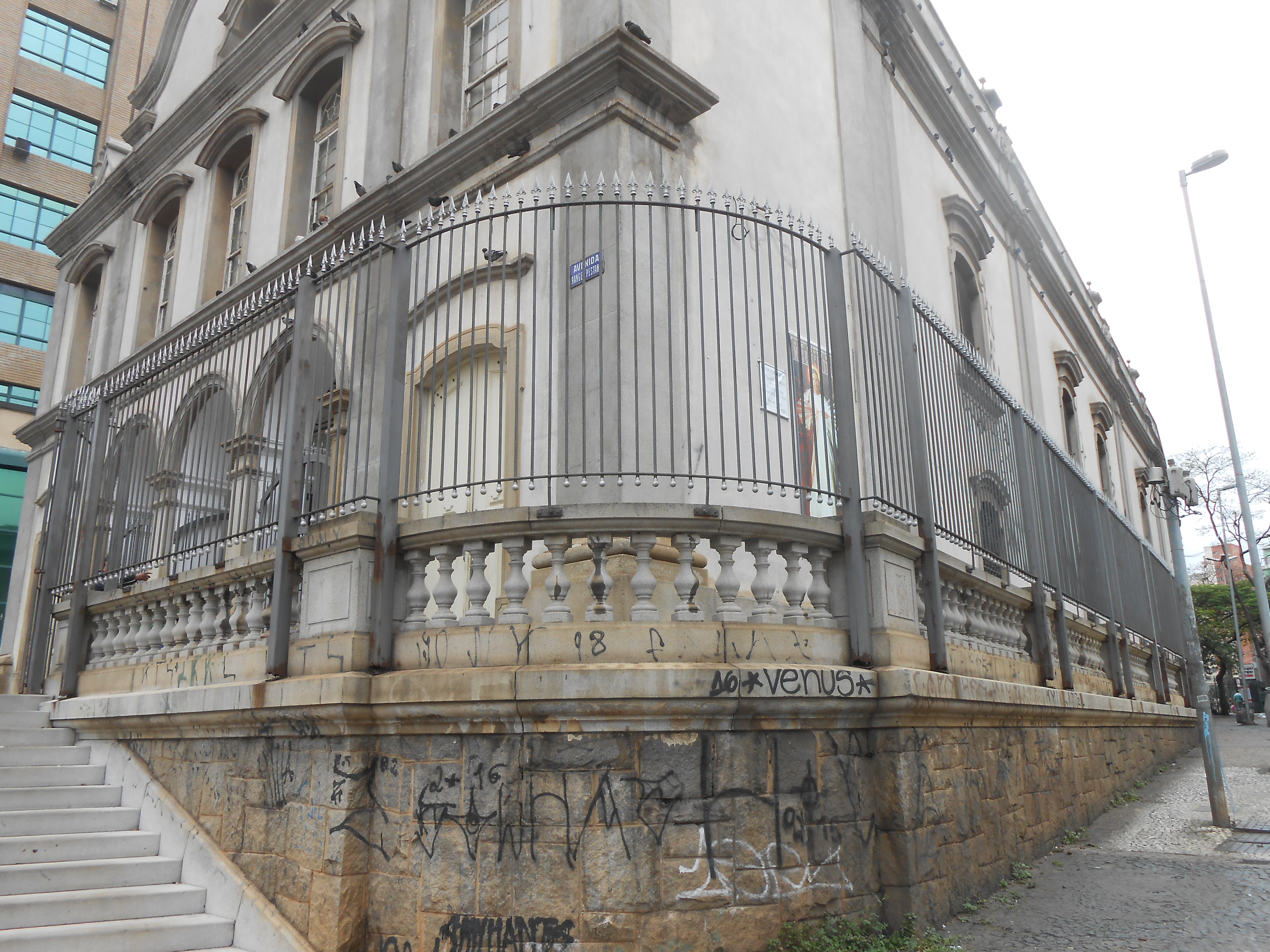
Exterior of the church.

The work on the new church lasted a long time and relied on donations from members. By 1758, the structure and facade were finished and a rammed earth wall between the chapel and the tower was erected. Externally, the Chapel of the Third Order of Mount Carmel was completed. Afterwards, both the friars' church and the chapel had their facades renovated. In November 1759, Antonio Ludovico, a carpenter and Third Brother, finished the altarpiece of the chancel and two other side altars. The painter João Pereira da Silva adjusted the tribunes, doors, the golden arch, the altar of the Senhor da Pedra Fria (Lord of the Cold Stone) and the ceiling panel. In the same year, the brotherhood decided to erect a new frontispiece using donations of money and materials. The plan was not executed for unknown reasons.

In 1761, Antonio Ludovico proceeded with the internal decoration of the chapel, sculpting the high altar and the side altars. João Pereira da Silva commissioned the gilding of the altars and the painting of the tribunes. In 1772, the frontispiece project was resumed using the stonework technique.

=== Connection with São Paulo ===
At the end of the 18th century, after the completion of the Chapel of the Third Order, the friars decided to rebuild their own temple. During this period, churches in São Paulo adopted imposing facades and larger structures to accommodate the new worshippers. The traditional rammed earth system remained in use, but new methods and more elaborate techniques were being explored to improve the quality of the frontispieces. The new skills allowed buildings to overcome the limitations of external ornamentation imposed by rammed earth.

In São Paulo, the churches represented the reactivation of economic life and the restoration of political autonomy. The ornaments and paintings in the Church of the Third Order of Mount Carmel were redesigned several times until the 19th century. There was great concern to provide it with rich furnishings and equip it with modern equipment for the celebration of religious services. During this period, every effort was made to make the chapel more expressive, rich and cultured.

=== New frontispiece ===
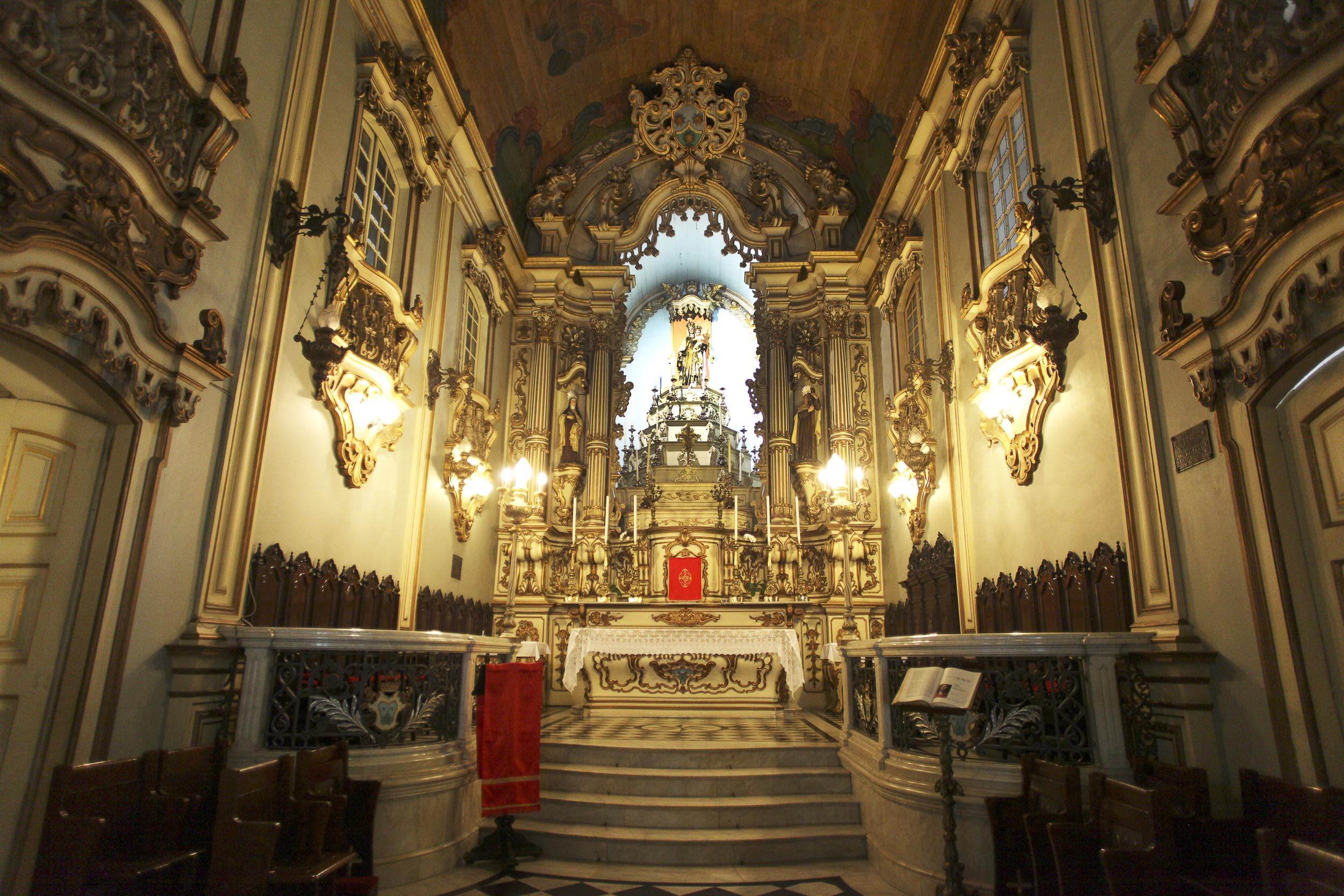
Rococo altarpiece of the Chapel of the Venerable Third Order of Mount Carmel in São Paulo.

Work on the new frontispiece and the three arches of the facade began in 1773 under the responsibility of Joaquim Pinto de Oliveira, also known as Tebas. In 1774, the brotherhood hired Antonio Nunes Correa to lead and supervise the workers involved in the renovation. The frontispiece arches were completed the following year. The remaining work was entrusted to the stonemason Antonio Francisco de Lemos, whose services were disapproved in an inspection carried out in 1776.

Joaquim Pinto de Oliveira was charged with undoing Lemos' mistakes and finishing the work. His task was to execute the original project and incorporate the Chapel of the Third Order of Mount Carmel into the newly renovated Carmelite buildings. The work included three arches, the design of the windows, the pilasters dividing and completing the structures of the churches, the pyramids and the alignment of the architrave, which formed a harmonious ensemble. A mixed construction system combining rammed earth, brickwork and stone masonry was used. The renovation of the frontispiece ended in 1777. Internally, the temple received decorations from Father Jesuíno do Monte Carmelo, who painted the ceiling of the nave; José Patrício Manso, who painted the ceiling of the Sacristy in 1785, entitled Nossa Senhora com o Menino e Santa Tereza (Our Lady with the Child and Saint Teresa) and José Pereira da Silva, who painted the ceiling of the consistory.

In 1928, the church next to the Chapel of the Third Order of Mount Carmel was expropriated and demolished to build the current Treasury Department building.

== Architectural features ==
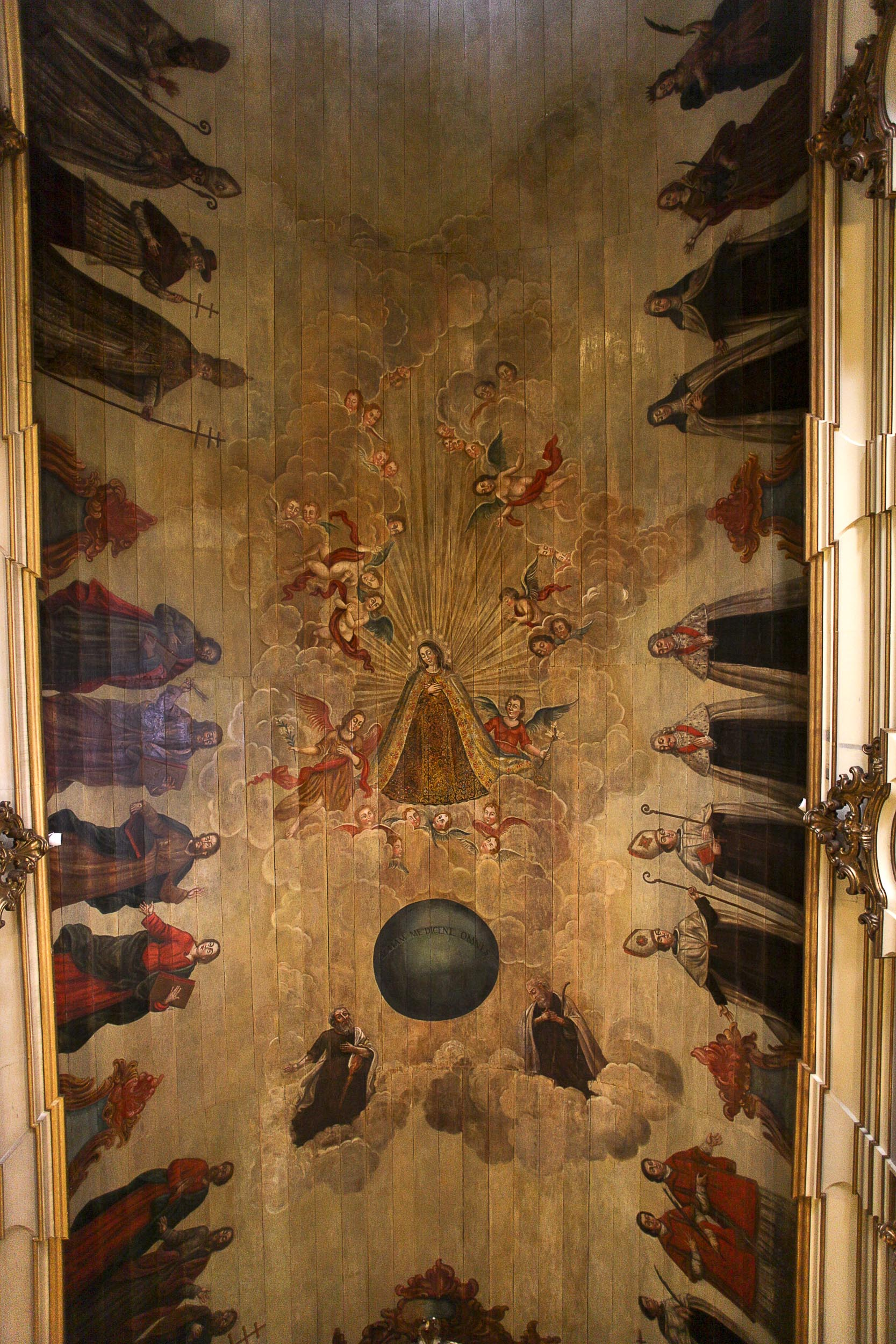
Painting by Friar Jesuíno on the chapel ceiling.

The interior decoration of the temple was mostly done by Friar Jesuíno do Monte Carmelo, José Patrício da Silva Manso and João Pereira da Silva.

=== Friar Jesuíno do Monte Carmelo ===
Friar Jesuíno do Monte Carmelo painted 24 panels on the chapel's nave ceiling entablature, a panel on the ceiling of the chancel, the ceiling of the choir and 18 paintings depicting passages from the life of Saint Teresa. The ceiling painting was hidden under other work and was rediscovered and recovered by IPHAN in 2006.

According to Mário de Andrade, between the end of the 19th century and the beginning of the 20th century, the segmental arches of the temple's nave were removed, Jesuíno's painting became disproportionate and Pedro Alexandrinho was commissioned to make a new composition. In 1920, the arches were relocated and Mário de Andrade concluded that Jesuíno had placed his painting between the central arches, as these already existed at the time. There were doubts as to whether or not the ceiling had been scraped before it was painted by Alexandrino.

== Historical and cultural importance ==
The Church of the Third Order of Mount Carmel is currently part of the architecture-themed tour of the Historic Center of São Paulo. Its decorative works constitute part of Brazilian Baroque art. Given the rarity and importance of these pieces, a process was opened on December 4, 1992 for the church to be listed as a historic monument by the National Institute of Historic and Artistic Heritage (IPHAN) and the Municipal Council for the Preservation of the Historical, Cultural and Environmental Heritage of the City of São Paulo (CONPRESP). The case includes the building erected in the second half of the 18th century; the frontispiece by Joaquim Pinto de Oliveira; the set of paintings by Father Jesuíno do Monte Carmelo, including his work on the ceiling of the chancel and his paintings left over from the old Chapel of the Recolhimento de Santa Teresa; the painting Nossa Senhora com o Menino e Santa Tereza, by José Patrício da Silva Manso, on the ceiling of the sacristy; the painting Ressurreição de Lázaro (Resurrection of Lazarus), by Manoel José Pereira, located on the ceiling of the former tomb, now the library and meeting room; altars, religious images and other carved works, totaling 124 inventoried assets; and the library and documentary archive of the Third Order of Mount Carmel of São Paulo.

== Gallery ==
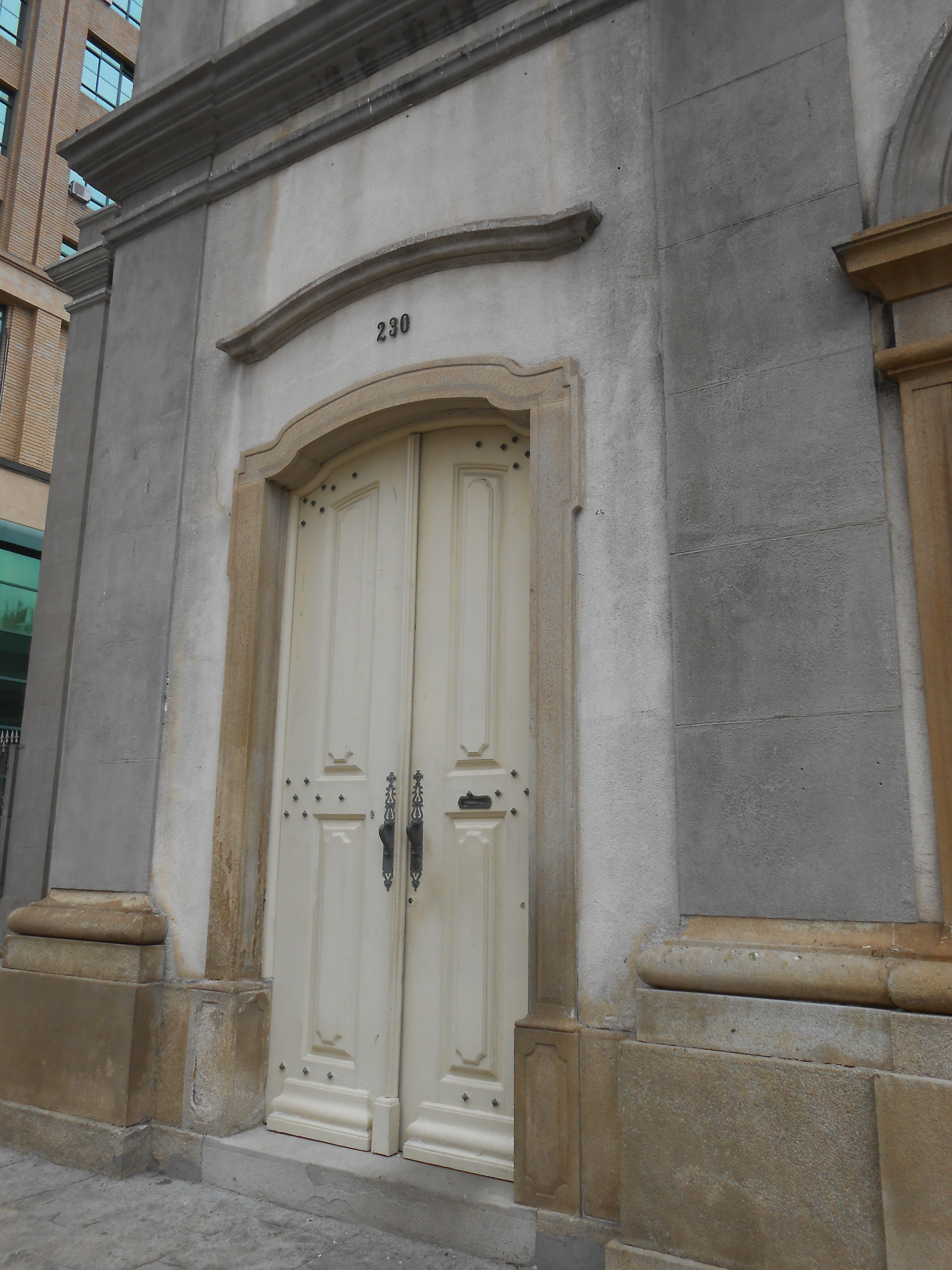
Church side doors.

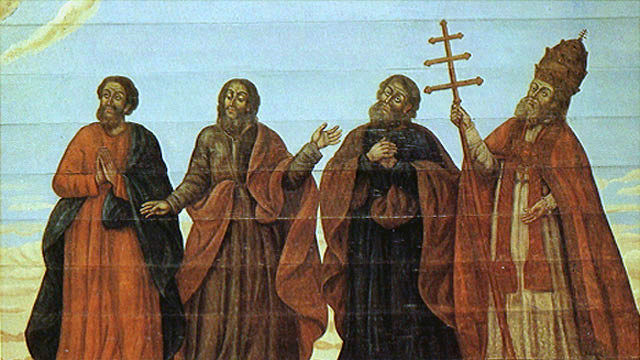
Work by Jesuíno do Monte Carmelo.

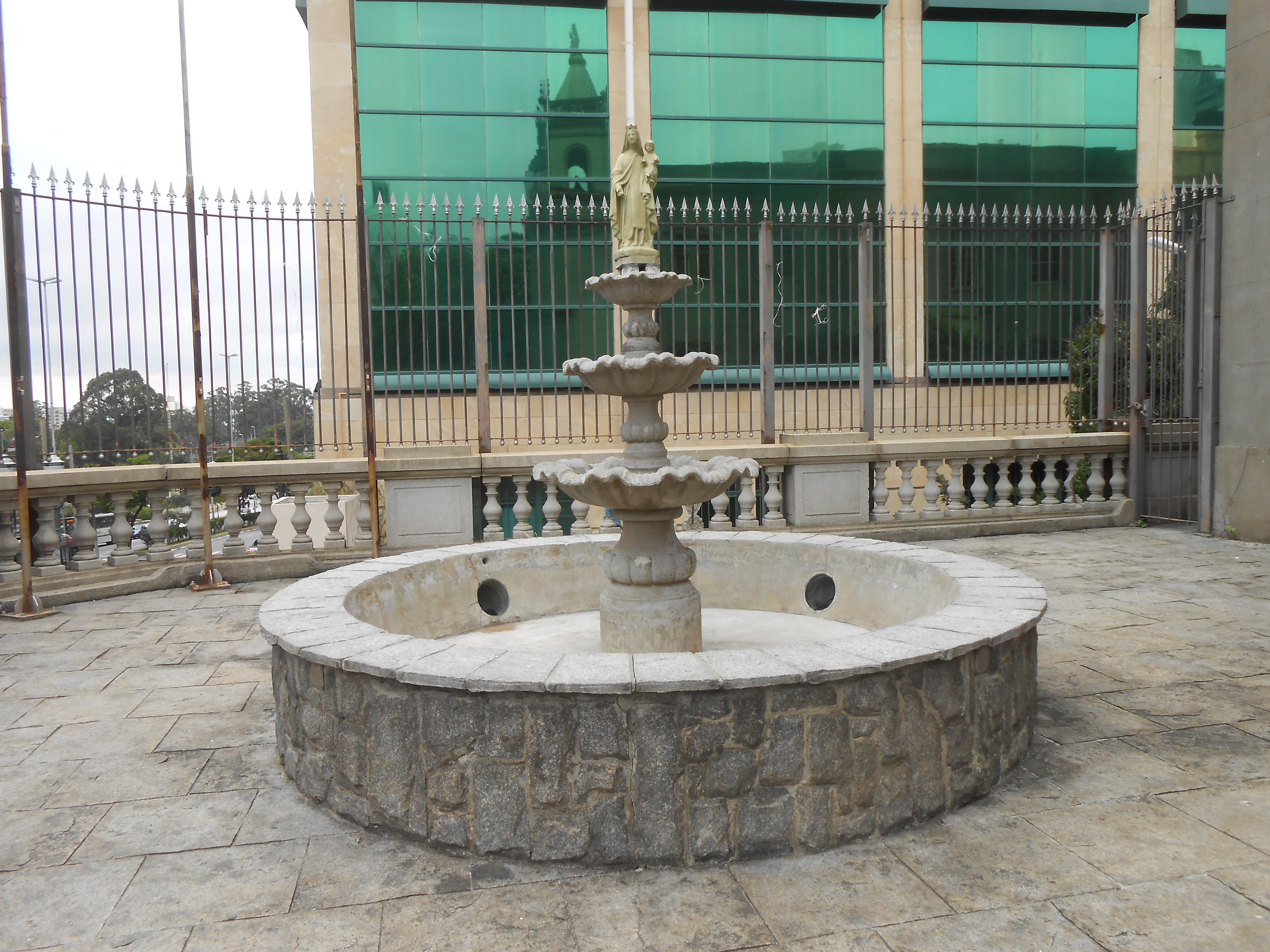
Fountain of the Church of the Third Order of Carmel.

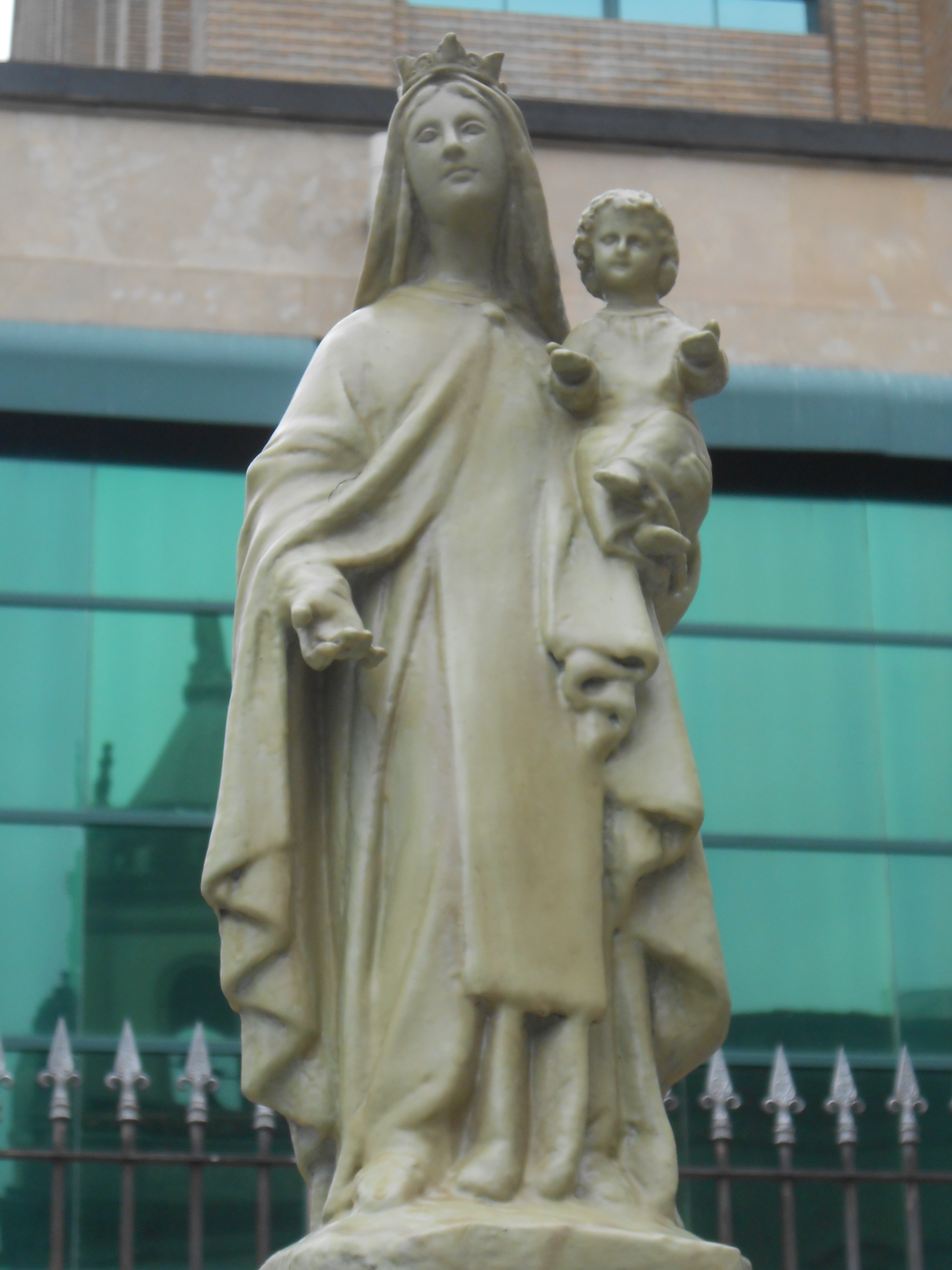
Image of Our Lady of Mount Carmel at the fountain.

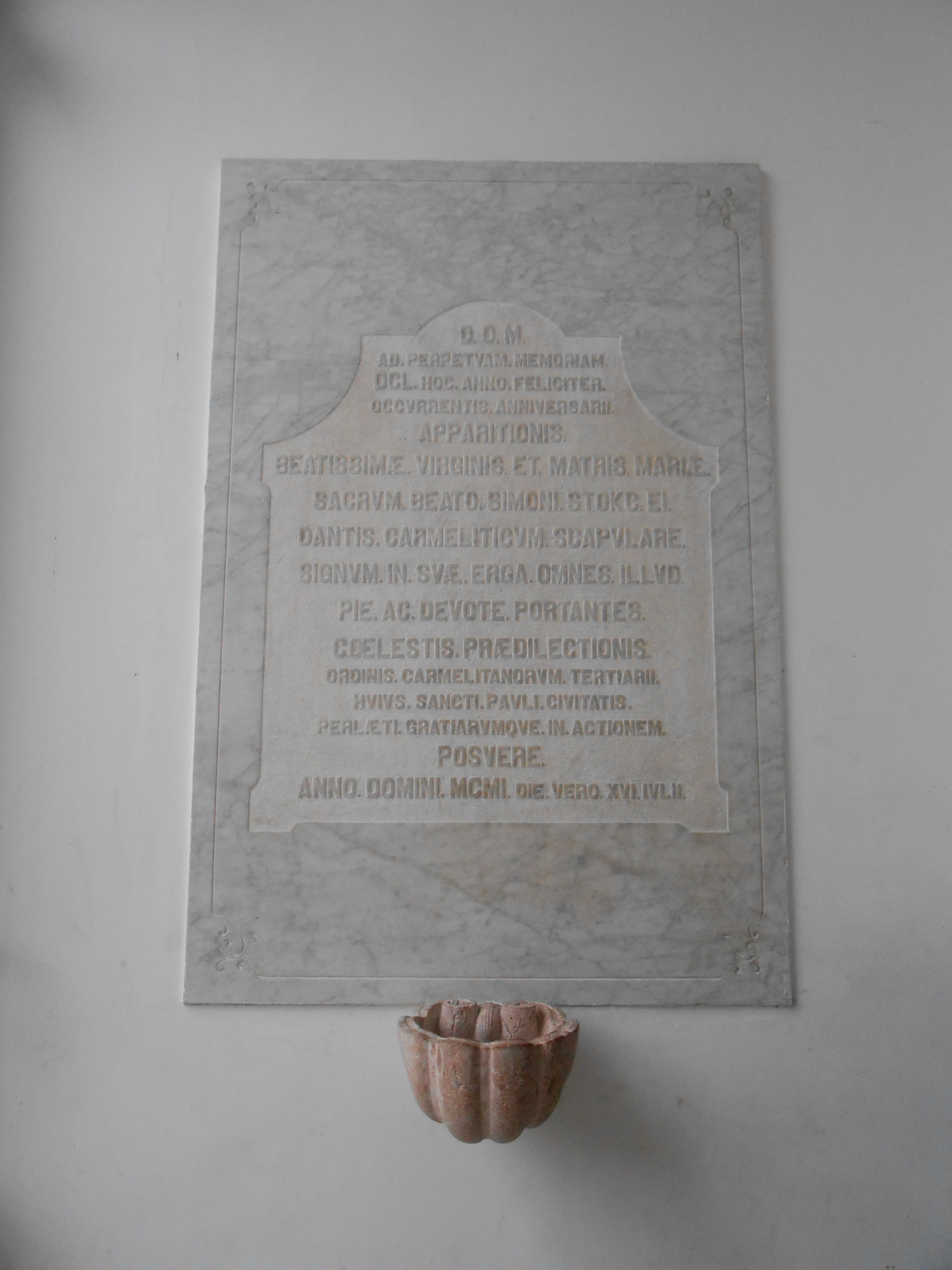
Plaque commemorating the 650th anniversary of the apparition in which Our Lady of Mount Carmel gave St. Simon Stock the brown scapular.

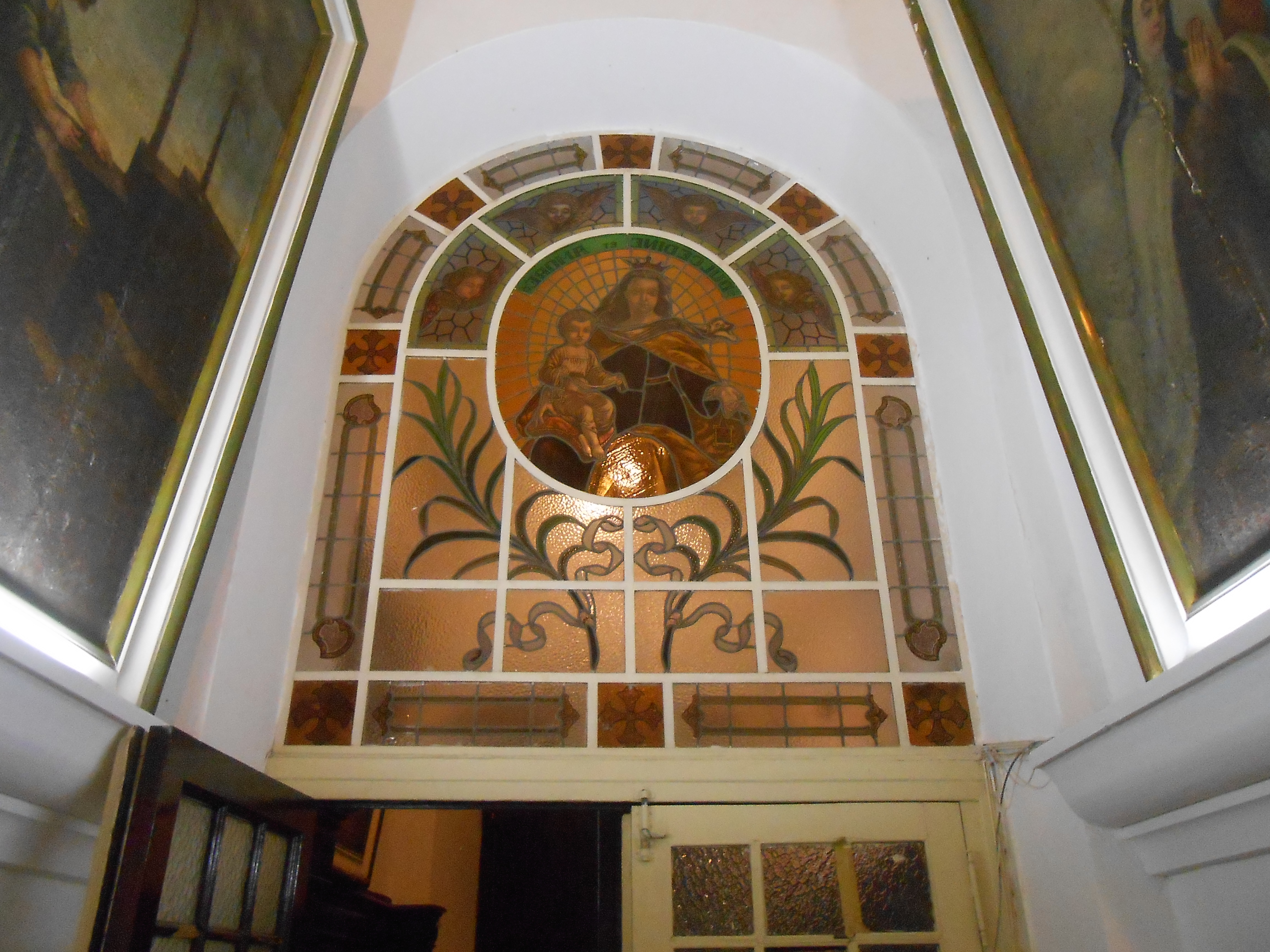
Stained glass window decorating the interior.

== See also ==
- Tourism in the city of São Paulo
- Church of Saint Anthony
