= Tebas (architect) =

Brazilian Architect

- Born: Joaquim Pinto de Oliveira Thebas; 1721; Santos, São Paulo
- Died: 11 January 1811 (aged 89–90); São Paulo, São Paulo
- Occupations: Architect, hydraulic engineer, stonemason
- Years active: Mid 18th century–1811
- Notable work: Refurbishment of São Paulo Cathedral's main tower, several other church facades

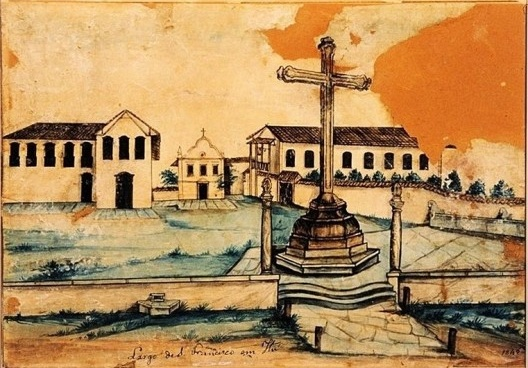
A monumental cross in the township of Itu, São Paulo designed and constructed by Tebas (watercolour by pt:Miguelzinho Dutra). The piece is extant to this day and preserved in excellent shape.

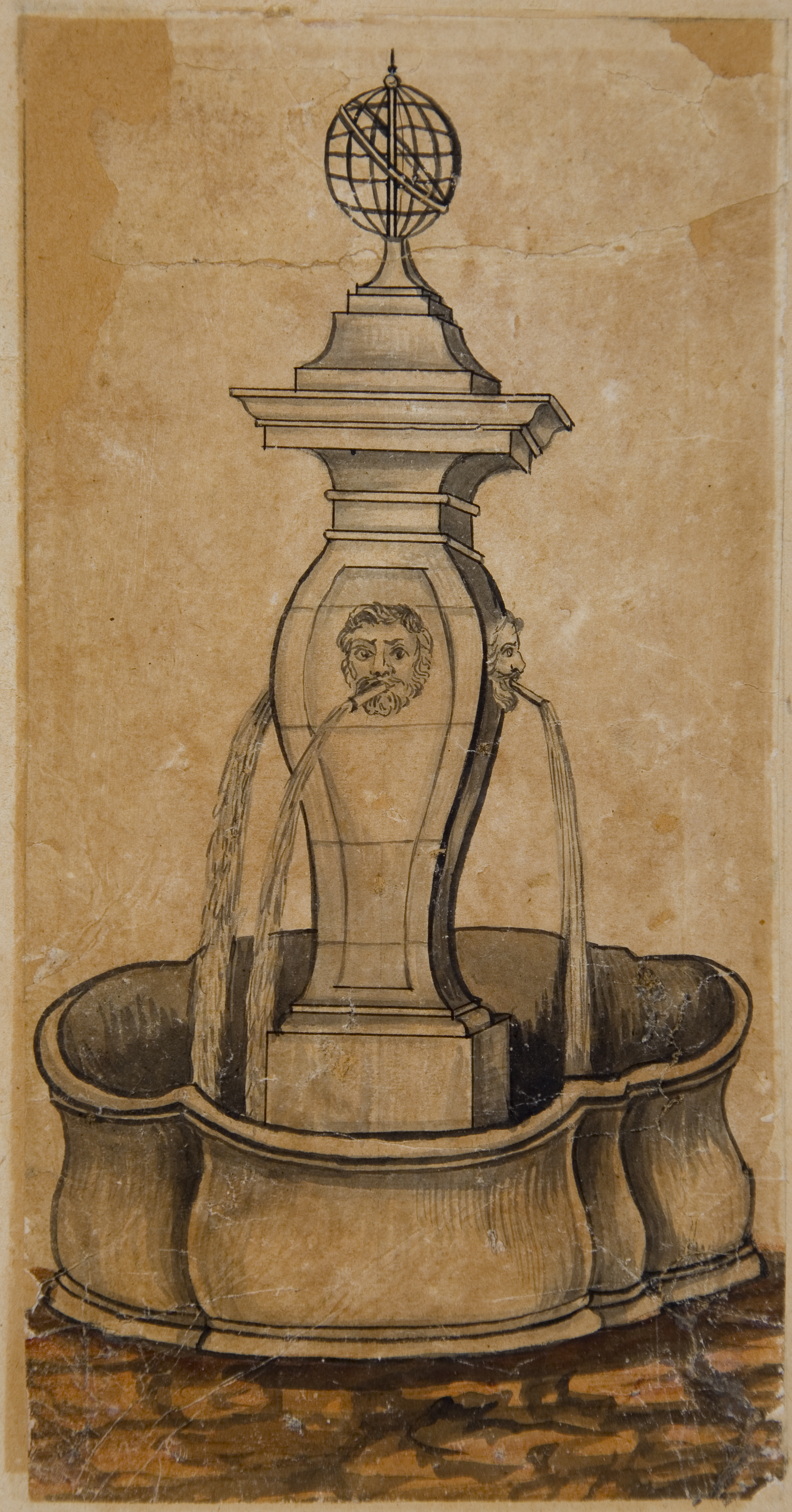
Misericórdia fountain in downtown São Paulo designed and possibly constructed by Tebas (line drawing by pt:Miguelzinho Dutra).

Joaquim Pinto de Oliveira Thebas (1721 – 11 January 1811), commonly known as Tebas (according to modern Portuguese spelling), was a Brazilian engineer, architect and stonemason who likely until the age of 58 was held captive as a slave by Portuguese settlers in Brazil, and possibly also by the Catholic Church. According to journalist and historian Afonso Antonio de Freitas (1870–1930), there was no construction work of importance in São Paulo at the time in which Tebas did not play a role, including the city's water supply. His modernising work in São Paulo was largely erased by demolition, but is still to be seen in the church facades of Church of the Third Order of Carmel and Church of the Wounds of the Seraphic Father Saint Francis. Tebas' importance to the history of Black peoples in Brazil has been compared to that of Luís Gama.

Tebas, whose mother was Clara Pinta de Araújo, was born an enslaved Black individual owned by Portuguese contractor Bento de Oliveira Lima and his wife Antonia Maria Pinta. As was customary at the time, he was given Portuguese surnames after the family names of his enslavers.

As a stonemason, Tebas introduced techniques still not in use in São Paulo's architectural works. The city, then expanding dramatically due to the success of sugarcane plantations across the state, was basically built with traditional rammed earth (taipa) technique. Christian religious orders in the city took advantage of Tebas' talent to erect churches and monasteries, with some reports claiming the Catholic Church was a late enslaver to him, having 'purchased' Tebas from his previous owners. The history of his affranchisement is not well-documented and subject to conflicting reports, with some maintaining he would have bought his freedom by paying with architectural projects.

In downtown São Paulo, the Chafariz da Misericórdia (Misericórdia Fountain) is displayed, it was a meeting place for enslaved workers who came in search of water to be carried back to the households of their enslavers. It was demolished in 1866.

Tebas' story remained relatively dormant for over 200 years, except for a song written in 1974 by pt:Geraldo Filme and sporadic mentions in academic works and seminars, as well as niche media. In 2018, he resurfaced with a book organised by journalist Abilio Ferreira being published to document and commemorate his memory under the auspices of Instituto IDEA and the São Paulo Council for Architecture and Urbanism (a government agency). In that same year, Tebas was declared an architect by the Union of Architects of the State of São Paulo. Google dedicated a Doodle to his memory on 30 June 2020. São Paulo mayor Bruno Covas announced on 10 September 2020 that a statue to Tebas was to be built in São Paulo's Old Downtown.
