= Law School, University of São Paulo =

Higher education institution in Brazil

Coordinates: 23°33′00″S 46°38′13″W

Law School of the University of São Paulo
- Former names: Academia de Direito de São Paulo; Faculdade de Direito de São Paulo
- Type: Law school
- Established: 11 August 1827; 199 years ago
- Parent institution: University of São Paulo
- Principal: Celso Fernandes Campilongo
- Vice-Principal: Ana Elisa Liberatore Silva Bechara
- Academic staff: 169
- Undergraduates: 2,400
- Location: São Paulo, São Paulo, Brazil
- Website: www.direito.usp.br

Night view of the building's façade.

The Law School of the University of São Paulo (Portuguese: Faculdade de Direito da Universidade de São Paulo, or also Faculdade de Direito do Largo de São Francisco) is an institution of higher education and research in the field of law located in São Paulo, Brazil. It joined the University of São Paulo (USP) in 1934, when the latter was established.

== History ==
One of the oldest establishments of higher education in Brazil, and the oldest law school, the São Francisco Law School (in Portuguese: "Faculdade de Direito do Largo de São Francisco"), was founded together with the Olinda Law School (later moved and renamed Recife Law School), by Brazilian Emperor Dom Pedro I on August 11, 1827, but its classes began earlier than Olinda's. As it was founded a few years after the proclamation of the Independence of Brazil, it was essential for the administration of the Brazilian Empire, having taught most of those who would later be part of the Brazilian government.

The school was first installed in a monastery building from the Franciscan order, which has been rebuilt several times since, for instance, after a fire. The most recent construction dates from 1934. A number of Brazilian politicians and famous writers have studied at Largo de São Francisco since its foundation, such as Castro Alves, Álvares de Azevedo, Fagundes Varela, Ruy Barbosa, Monteiro Lobato.

There is a statue of Álvares de Azevedo in front of the building with this quote: "Foi poeta, sonhou e amou na vida", which translates to "He was a poet, dreamed and loved in life".

Students come from all over the country to study at São Francisco and contribute with bohemian and cultural lifestyle to the Brazilian most cosmopolitan city of São Paulo.

There is a gravestone in its patio, where Julius Frank, a German professor dear to students, was buried in 1841. Because Frank was a Protestant, he could not be buried in any of the Catholic graveyards in São Paulo, so the students chose to bury him inside the school as homage.

== Ranking ==
Consistently ranked as the best Law School in Brazil, São Francisco Law School has been the alma mater to 13 Brazilian presidents and many outstanding public officers, diplomats, scholars, writers, politicians and businessmen. Each year São Francisco Law School admits 460 new students in its undergraduate (LL.B.) program, from roughly 10,000 to 15,000 applicants. Graduate programs (LL.M. and SJD) are also available.
