= Largo de São Francisco =

Region in São Paulo, Brazil

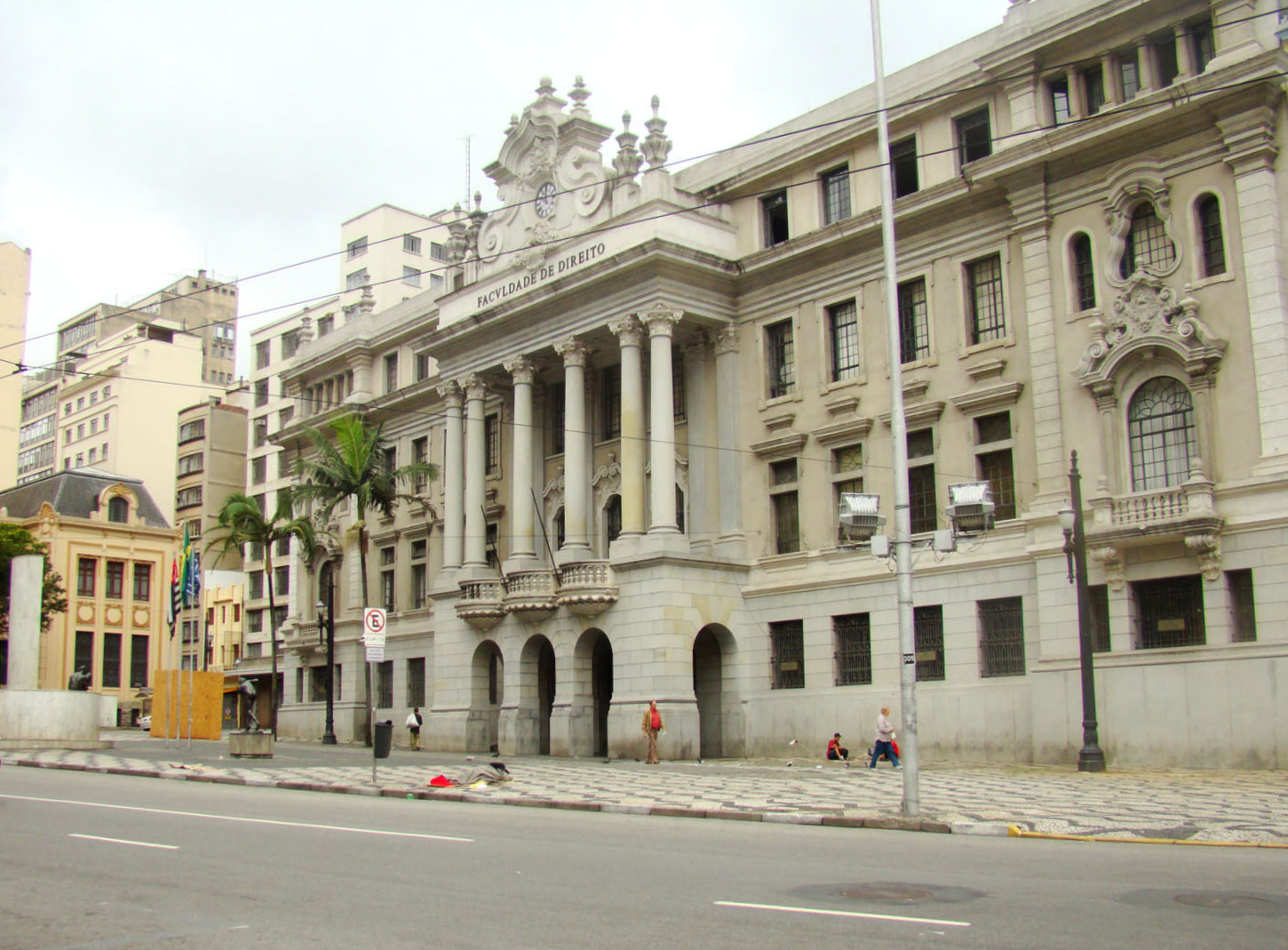
- Law School of the University of São Paulo, located in Largo São Francisco

- Location within São Paulo Location within Brazil
- Location: São Paulo, São Paulo; Brazil
- Coordinates: 23°32′58.9″S 46°38′13.1″W
- Opened: 1640; 386 years ago

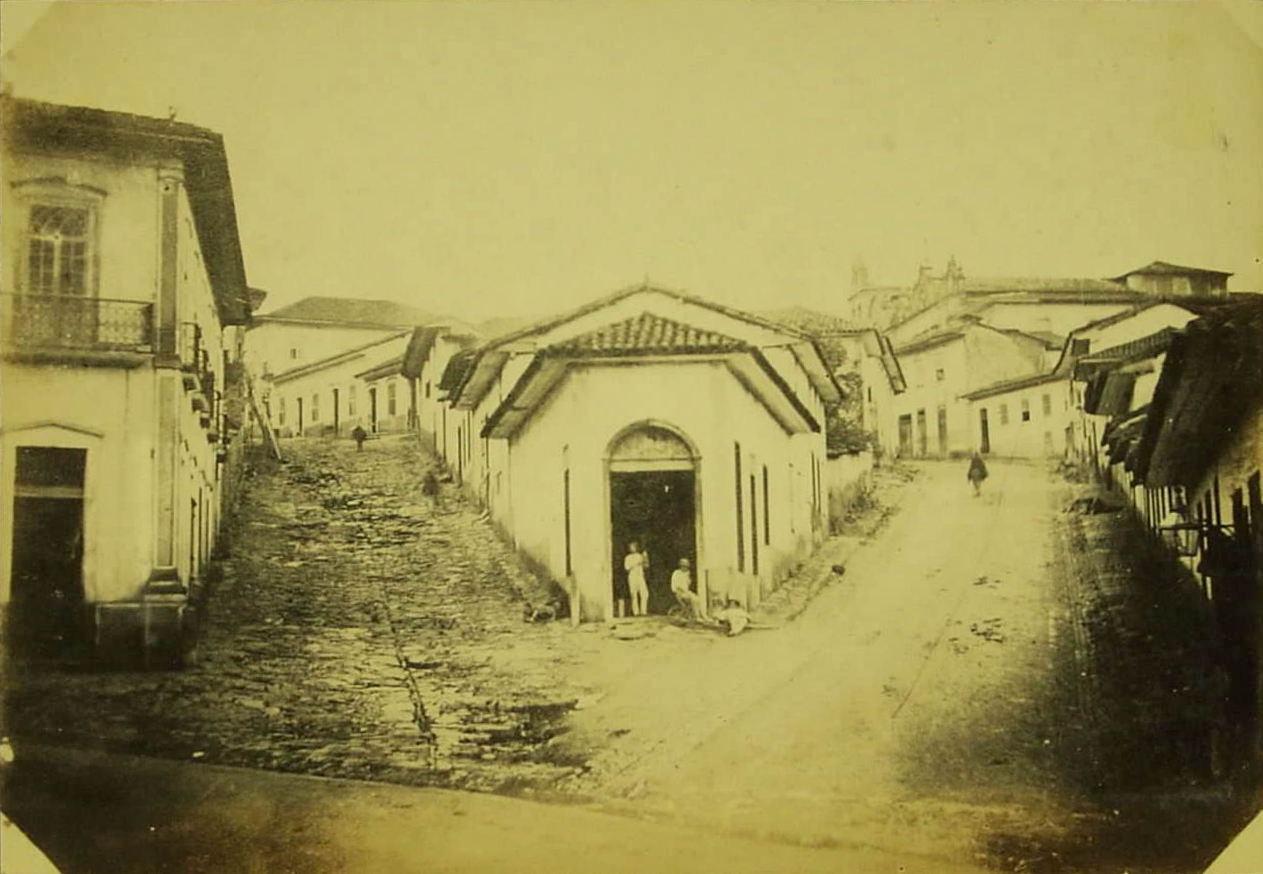
Ladeira do Ouvidor, Largo de São Francisco, ca. 1860.

Largo de São Francisco is home to some important landmarks in the history of São Paulo and is considered one of the city's main Baroque architecture complexes. It is also known as the "ground zero" of Brigadeiro Luís Antônio, one of the city's most important avenues.

It houses the Law School of the University of São Paulo (FDUSP) and the Álvares Penteado School of Commerce Foundation (FECAP), as well as the Church of Saint Francis and the Church of the Third Order of Penance. The side street is called Cristóvão Colombo.

== History ==
In the 1640s, the Convent of Saint Francis was established on the site, forming one of the oldest ensembles of religious architecture in the city of São Paulo. The three buildings that make up the complex - the Law School, the Church of Saint Francis and the Church of the Third Order of Penance - were part of a small farm, whose boundaries were most likely established in 1642.

The Church of Saint Francis of Assisi, built of rammed earth with walls 1.5 meters thick, began to be constructed in 1642 and was inaugurated in 1647. Its interior, although not very sophisticated, tells the story of Franciscan priests in images. Some of these figures had great value, such as that of Saint Francis, considered the most attractive in a Franciscan convent in the country. It is the main complex of Baroque architecture in the city of São Paulo.

In September 1639, the caravan of the seven friars who founded the convent set off from Rio de Janeiro, arriving on the plateau in São Paulo only in January of the following year. Initially, they settled where Patriarca Square is today, at the end of the Viaduto do Chá. The site turned out to be unsuitable for building the convent due to the lack of water and exposure to the winds hitting the Anhangabaú Valley. Due to the initial difficulties, another plot of land was donated to the Franciscans by the São Paulo City Council. Construction began only four and a half years later and the convent was inaugurated on September 17, 1647, along with the Feast of the Wounds of Saint Francis.

Around 1800, the land in front of the convent was called Largo do Capim by the locals, due to the large quantity of this grass there. From 1828 onwards, the convent's premises were occupied by the Law School of the University of São Paulo, equipped with a library containing around 300,000 titles (many authored by former students). The plot in front of the faculty was renamed Largo do Curso Jurídico.

The appearance of the area, which used to be baroque, underwent a transformation in 1930 when the Convent of Saint Francis was demolished and a neo-colonial style building was erected in its place four years later. The Faculty stands in the same place to this day. From the mid-19th century, the site was called by its current name: Largo de São Francisco.

== See also ==
- Central Zone of São Paulo
- Historic Center of São Paulo
- Largo São Bento
