= Ricardo Junqueira =

Ricardo Junqueira (born May 21, 1965, in Brasília) is Brazilian photographer. He is known for his authorial, documentary, and architectural work, with a focus on social and cultural themes.

== Biography ==
He began his career in 1979, developing as a self-taught photographer and participating in exhibitions in Brazil and abroad. He holds a degree in Social Communication from the Centro Universitário de Brasília (CEUB). He currently resides in Lisbon, Portugal, where he continues to work in the field of photography and the arts.

== Career ==
In 1987, he photographed the cover of the album Que País É Este by the Brazilian rock band Legião Urbana. He had previously co-founded the photography agency Pós-New together with photographer Nick ElMoor. He documented several historic events in the Brasília rock scene.

In 1988, he moved to São Paulo, where he became an advertising photographer and a professor at the Panamericana School of Art in São Paulo. In 1991, he participated at the 21st São Paulo Art Biennial in collaboration with set designers Adriano and Fernando Guimarães.

In 1996, he moved to Natal, Rio Grande do Norte, where he worked as an advertising and documentary photographer. In 2009, he organized the traveling exhibition Coletivo Potiguar at Caixa Cultural, featuring photographers Numo Rama, Jean Lopes, Jean Frota, Erik Van Der Weijde, Karen Montenegro, Hugo Macedo, Max Pereira, Pablo Pinheiro, and Ricardo Junqueira himself.

He was the photographer responsible for the commemorative postage stamp "1º show com luz" ("First Show with Light"), issued by Correios in tribute to singer Renato Russo, lead vocalist of Legião Urbana. The tribute, suggested by the public, was among the most voted by the National Philatelic Commission and approved by the Ministry of Science, Technology, Innovations and Communications. The stamp features an image of the artist on stage during one of his performances. The stamp block also includes an excerpt from the song "Vinte e Nove," composed by Renato Russo and released on the album O Descobrimento do Brazil (1993) by Legião Urbana. According to Correios, since 2013 more than one thousand suggestions had been submitted by the public for the artist to be honored with a special postage stamp.

In 2010, Ricardo Junqueira won the 11th Marc Ferrez Photography Prize (Funarte) for the book Memória (Memory).

He has been a member of the AFP – Associação de Fotógrafos Profissionais de Portugal since 2012. He has been affiliated with Abrafoto – the Brazilian Association of Advertising Photographers – since 1999 and serves as a board member of the RPCFB (Network of Cultural Producers of Brazílian Photography).

He currently works as an architectural photographer and art.

== Exhibitions ==
Selected exhibitions include:

- 2015 – A altura do Olhar – Convento dos Cardaes – Lisbon
- 2011 – Zé dos Montes – Officina Interiores – Natal – Brazil
- 2009 – Herbarium – Galeria Hiato – Juiz de Fora MG
- 2007 – Trilhas e outros caminhos – Natal Shopping Center – Natal
- 2006 – Seletivas – Ímã Fotogaleria – São Paulo
- 2005 – CANA – O universo da cana-de-açúcar no Rio Grande do Norte – MUBE – São Paulo
- 2005 – c.a.s.a. – Conjunto Cultural da Caixa – Salvador
- 2004 – c.a.s.a. – Conjunto Cultural da Caixa – São Paulo
- 2003 – c.a.s.a. – Conjunto Cultural da Caixa – Brasília
- 2003 – CANA – O universo da cana-de-açúcar no Rio Grande do Norte – Solar Bela Vista – Natal
- 2003 – c.a.s.a. – Tribunal de Contas do RN – Natal
- 2002 – V.I.P. – Pessoas muito importantes – Casa da Ribeira – Natal
- 2001 – Herbarium – IBRIT – Milano – Italy
- 2001 – Herbarium – Natal Shopping – Natal
- 2000 – V.I.P. – Espaço Emporium – Natal
- 2000 – Casa da Ribeira – Um Espaço e seus Passos – Natal
- 1999 – A Cara da Casa – Casa da Ribeira – Natal
- 1996 – Herbarium – Espaço Cultural 508 – Brasília
- 1996 – Herbarium – Li Photogallery – São Paulo
- 1991 – 21ª Bienal de São Paulo
- 1991 – Macbeth Ainda Mauser – Sala Martins Penna – Teatro Nacional de Brasília
- 1991 – Macbeth Mauser – Cenas de uma Tragédia – Sala Villa Lobos – Teatro Nacional de Brasília
- 1990 – Retrospectiva – Teatro e Dança – Jogos de Cena – Teatro Sesc Garagem – Brasília
- 1990 – Provisoriamente Paixões – Sala de Exposições da Aliança Francesa – São Paulo
- 1989 – Provisoriamente Paixões – Fundação Cultural do DF – Brasília
- 1989 – Provisoriamente Paixões – Um Processo de Montagem – Galeria Le Corbusier – Brasília
- 1987 – Atopos – Eliana Carneiro – Sala Martins Penna – Nacional de Brasília Theatre

== Books ==
- 2019 - Pós-New Brasília 1981/1989: A biografia fotográfica de um tempo que não foi perdido (The photographic biography of a time that was not lost).
- 2012 - Rio Grande do Norte – Trilhas e Outros Caminhos (Trails and Other Paths) – 2nd edition.
- 2010 - Memória (Memory) - Prêmio Marc Ferrez de Fotografia.
- 2007 - Rio Grande do Norte – Trilhas e Outros Caminhos (Trails and Other Paths).
- 2001 - Rio Grande do Norte – Caminhos da Arte (Paths of Art) – ed. Bustamante.
- 2000 – Chivas Regal 200 anos years – 200 dicas (tips) – tudo que você queria saber sobre whisky (Everything You Wanted to Know About Whisky)
