= Banco do Brasil Cultural Center (São Paulo) =

Cultural space in São Paulo, Brazil

- Centro Cultural Banco do Brasil
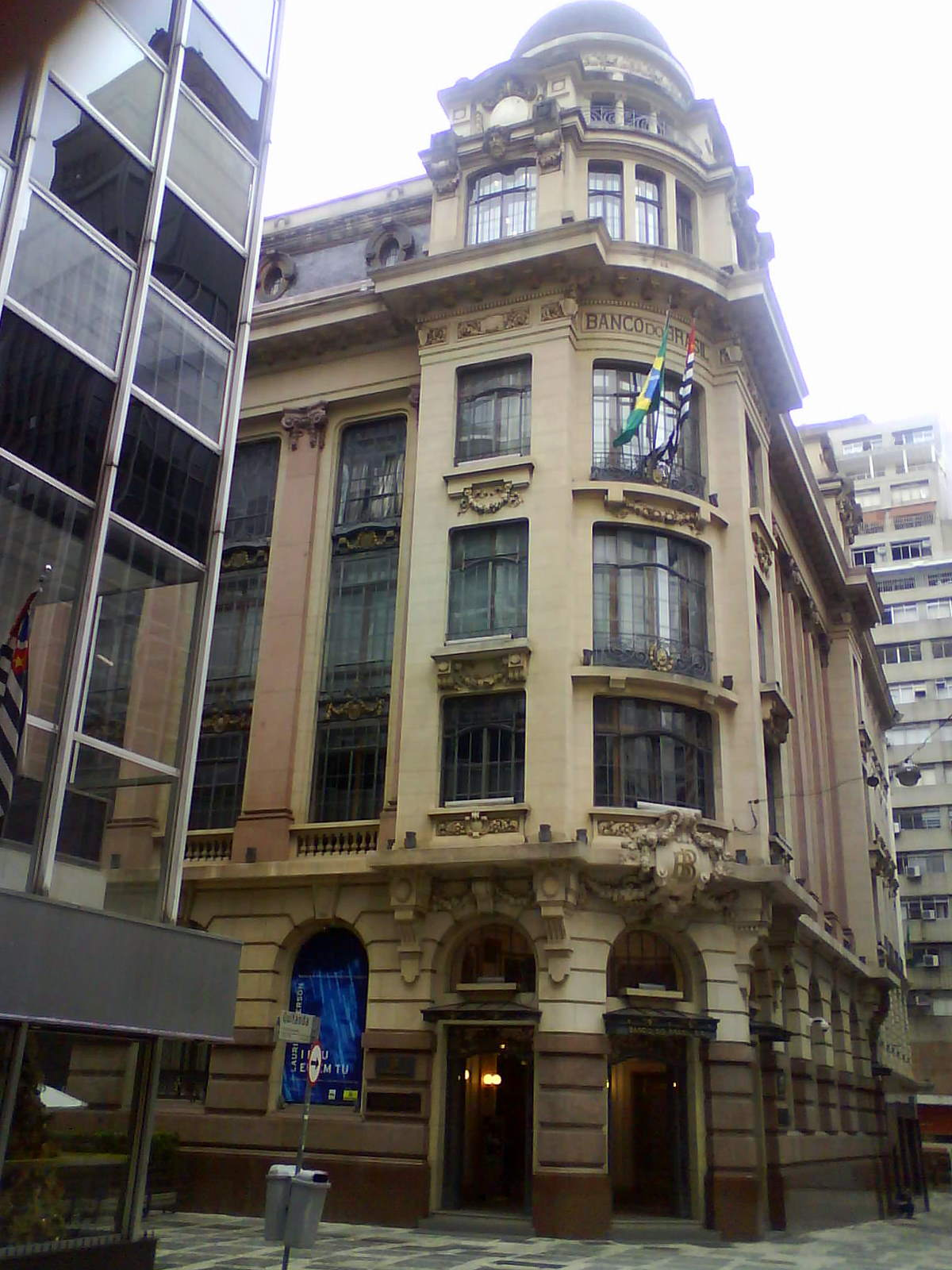
- Facade of the building

- Location within São Paulo Location within Brazil
- Established: 2001
- Location: São Paulo, São Paulo; Brazil
- Coordinates: 23°32′51″S 46°38′4.6″W
- Type: Cultural center
- Website: https://ccbb.com.br/sao-paulo/

The Banco do Brasil Cultural Center (Portuguese: Centro Cultural Banco do Brasil) in São Paulo, also known as CCBB São Paulo, opened on April 21, 2001. It is located in Álvares Penteado Street, in the historic center of São Paulo, and can be accessed by metro from São Bento Station. Currently, the streets around the building are pedestrian-only.

In 1923, Banco do Brasil bought the old building, built in 1901, and hired Hippolyto Gustavo Pujol Junior, an engineer-architect, to convert it into a five-storey bank branch, which operated from 1927 until 1996. It was the bank's first building in São Paulo. Elements of the original architecture were restored to preserve the features that made the building one of the most significant examples in the city.

The headquarters covers 4,183 square meters and includes exhibition halls, a cinema, a theater, an auditorium, a restaurant, a shop and a coffee shop. According to The Art Newspaper's ranking, it is the fifth most visited cultural institution in the country and 69th in the world.

== History ==
=== Early 20th century ===
At the beginning of the 20th century, the buildings with a banking function began to assume particular architectural characteristics. Giulio Carlo Argan, an Italian art historian and theorist, points out that the banks have become a type of glass-covered palace with an interior portico. These spaces were composed of arcades that created halls used for banking counters, with one part reserved for the public and the other for the offices.

The Alvares Penteado Street, formerly known as Comércio Street, was one of the most populated addresses in the city of São Paulo at the beginning of the 20th century. Before the cultural center building was erected in 1901, the site was occupied by Confeitaria Leão, which suffered a fire in 1867, and by a two-story house with shops on the first floor and apartments on the second floor.

At the end of the 19th century, banking institutions were located on São Bento, 15 de Novembro and Comercio streets, in the central perimeter of the city, a zone dominated by coffee-growing landowners and people concerned with real estate investment. The properties in the area should house any type of commerce or service to guarantee a financial return for the investors who paid for their construction.

=== Establishing the bank ===
In the 1920s, Banco do Brasil restored its relationship with the federal government and obtained permission to open a portfolio to rediscount the shares of other banks. During this period of growth, the building on Alvares Penteado Street was acquired and rebuilt.

In 1927, after a renovation designed by architect Hippolyto Pujol, the building became Banco do Brasil's first headquarters in São Paulo. Pujol, who had already designed Jardim Europa at the end of the 1920s, developed his architectural narrative in line with European styles, especially Art Nouveau, but adapting it to Brazilian urban molds.

In Pujol's project for the Banco do Brasil, five floors were built and the bank's vaults were installed in the basement, including a large central chamber, armed and armored. Originally, the cellar was planned to contain two large rooms to house the equipment required for the safe deposit box rental service. The first floor housed all the bank's services accessible to the public, including management, submanagement, secretarial services, foreign exchange, discount section, remittances, current account and cashier. The second floor contained the bank's services not accessible to the public, such as the board meeting rooms, accounting, correspondence and archives. The second and third floors had rooms for rent, which were accessed from Quitanda Street. The renovation designed by Pujol incorporated the perimeter walls, but demolished all the internal parts and the roof.

The building served as Banco do Brasil's central branch until 1957, when these services were transferred to the premises on Líbero Badaró Street. Later, the property on Álvares Penteado Street was occupied by the bank's real estate administration department, but the first floor remained as a service station.

In the 1960s, due to the Banking Reform Law and the creation of the Conselho Monetário Nacional (English: National Monetary Council), Banco do Brasil had to adapt its operating profile and entered the market in search of clients. Besides expanding the number of branches, Banco do Brasil improved its customer service system and offered more attractive products to its customers. With the authorization granted by the government in August 1986, the bank opened BB Distribuidora de Títulos e Valores Mobiliários and launched the Fundo Mútuo de Investimentos Ações-Ouro and the Caderneta de Poupança Ouro. Consequently, Banco do Brasil entered a segment already occupied by large financial conglomerates and began to compete for market share.

In the 1990s, Banco do Brasil underwent an administrative overhaul and reduced its central administration and headcount by around 10%. In addition, the Real Plan increased interest rates and overvalued the exchange rate, impacting the company due to inflationary gains and the appreciation of the real against the dollar. As a result, Banco do Brasil rationalized its network and reduced the number of units. In the process, the branch on Álvares Penteado Street was closed and the bank transferred all its functions to the agency on Líbero Badaró Street.

== Current status ==
=== Establishment of the Banco do Brasil Cultural Center ===
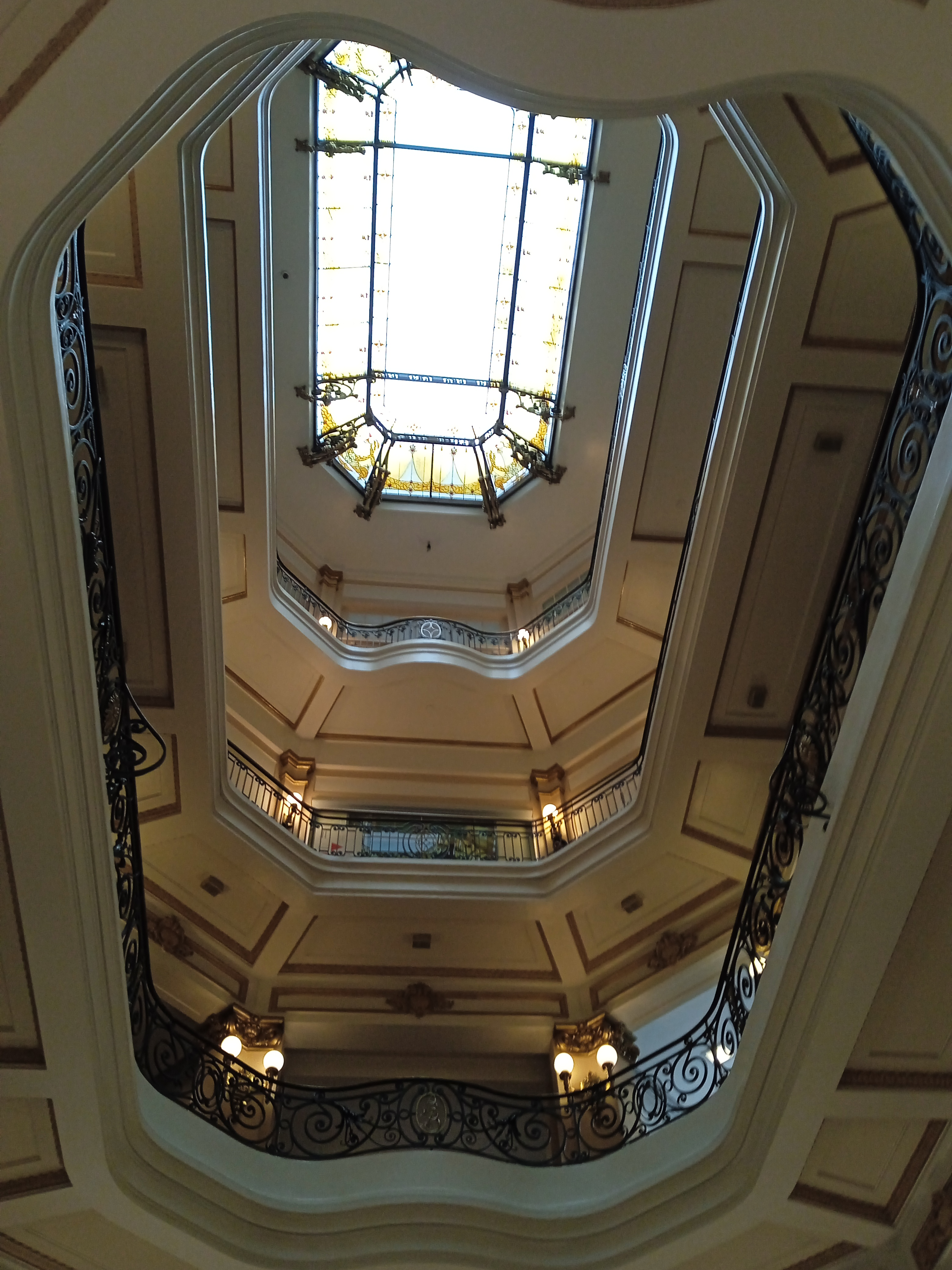
Inside the cultural center.

The idea of installing a cultural center in the building arose in 1992, when a study group was formed to develop the proposal. At the time, the premises on Álvares Penteado Street was considered an option. LT Arquitetura was contacted by Banco do Brasil to design the renovation, but the projects were dropped.

At the beginning of 1999, the then president of Banco do Brasil, Andrea Calabi, recovered the project and commissioned a technical study on the implementation of the cultural center. In June, in order to modernize the area according to the new functional requirements of a contemporary cultural space, the project was reformulated with the participation of architects Luiz Telles, Miriam Macul, Renato Riani, Silva Simões and Paulo Gambini. In September, the project was sent to the patrimony agencies, Condephaat and Conpresp, and was approved.

Architect Luiz Telles was chosen to take on the CCBB's work after his project for the São Paulo Cultural Center, located on Vergueiro Street. However, the CCBB required the transformation of an almost 100-year-old building, whose facade and other elements have already been protected, into an efficient space for multiple cultural activities.

During the project, the skylight was lifted to the fourth floor; to support it, a structure of metal profiles covered with plaster was created. The agency's vaults, located in the basement, had their bronze and steel doors restored and were transformed into numismatic exhibition rooms. On the first floor, the service counters that surrounded the central lobby were reduced to improve circulation in the entrance hall. The remaining sections were used as a ticket office, reception and luggage storage; the removed parts were reutilized in the chocolate store on the third floor. There is also a restaurant on the mezzanine floor.

Currently, the first floor houses a cinema, video room and workshop room, and the second floor was converted into an exhibition space and a cybercafe. The third floor includes other exhibition rooms and the theater, which seats 135 people and is distributed over two levels. The complex also has administration areas, souvenir stores, a machine room and air-conditioning installations. The old window frames were covered with acoustic glass and the mosaic floor, which covered the entire first floor and had some worn sections, was kept only in the central atrium. All these pieces were restored manually and went through a complete refitting process.

The Banco do Brasil Cultural Center was inaugurated on April 21, 2001, and became known for its technological standards. All the spaces were air-conditioned, as well as having audio and data communication instruments. Original Pujol pieces such as the main elevator and the lobby clock are now controlled by digital systems. The space has an extensive cultural agenda that includes exhibitions, shows, films and debates, as well as several concerts. The bank invested around R$6 million in order to establish partnerships with other cultural venues in the city. After its inauguration, CCBB Rio de Janeiro relocated part of its collection of works and sculptures stored in the bank's warehouses to the new headquarters. Other works from the bank's collection throughout Brazil were also brought to São Paulo.

The CCBB's schedule is produced annually and involves an online application process for projects by any individual or company of any nationality. Registration takes place by filling in an extensive electronic form between April and May. Once the application phase is over, the projects are studied by CCBB analysts.

== Architecture ==
The building has a characteristically French architecture and method of application. It was built in a reinforced concrete structure and brick masonry with imported materials such as the French stone slabs of the roof and the North American sconces and light fittings. The corner entrance, combined with eclectic ornamentation, aimed to maximize occupancy and better use of internal space. The facade of the building is decorated with ornaments, such as the wrought iron coffee foliage on the internal and external railings, the central skylight and the images of the Greek gods Mercury and Vulcan in the entrance hall. Its layout characterizes an architectural program from the early 20th century, with little space for public circulation and many office areas.

The floors where the bank operated are decorated with carved capitals, gilded ornaments and two-armed lamps. On the second floor, the capitals are straight, the slabs simple and the lights have a single arm. The first floor was marked by the rustic openings of the arches. The intermediate levels were organized in Ionic order and the roof featured a mansard. Due to its location, on the corner of the block, it was necessary to use an angled solution for the Baroque dome. One of the main architectural features is the solution of the central span of the interior with a double transparent light filter. The building's architecture is also characterized by a mixture of artistic influences. The Art Nouveau style is visible in the stained glass located at the top of the iron railings on the mezzanine and second floor, while Art Deco elements are evident in the chandeliers, the entrance hall and the wall lights.

== Historical and cultural significance ==
Despite the renovations, the building has not undergone many significant changes since 1927. The study for the conservation process began in June 1985 and the process was opened in August of the same year by the Condephaat and Conpresp. The document specified that any modification, renovation or destruction had to be preceded by authorization to avoid de-characterization. The property was declared a cultural asset of artistic, urban, architectural, historical and tourist interest. It was registered in the Livro do Tombo Histórico on January 19, 2005.

== Review ==
On September 28, 2014, Folha de S.Paulo published the results of its team's evaluation of the sixty largest theaters in the city of São Paulo. The Banco do Brasil Cultural Center's premises were awarded three stars, a "regular" rating and the following consensus: "As well as enjoying a view of the building's neoclassical architecture, visitors can shop in the attached store and enjoy a break at Cafezal Cafés. In the theater, the comfort of the armchairs and the spacing between the seats is regular, but the visibility from the mezzanine is poor."

== See also ==
- Banco do Brasil Cultural Center
- CAIXA Cultural São Paulo
- São Paulo Cultural Center
