= Homesickness =

Distress caused by being away from home

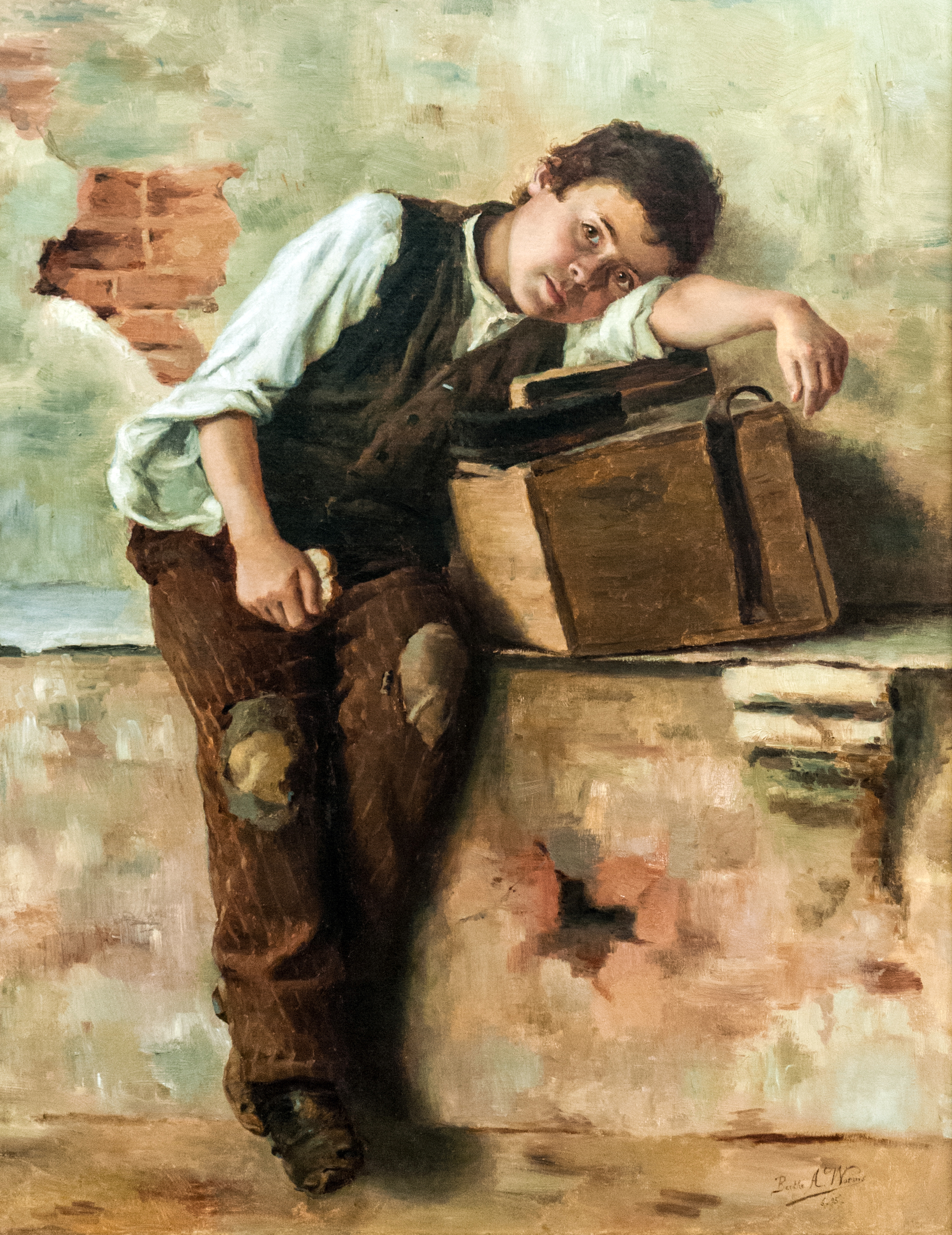
Homesick for Naples (1895), painting by Bertha Worms

Homesickness is the distress caused by being away from home. Its cognitive hallmark is preoccupying thoughts of home and attachment objects. Sufferers typically report a combination of depressive and anxious symptoms, withdrawn behavior and difficulty focusing on topics unrelated to home. Experienced by children and adults, the affected person may be taking a short trip to a nearby place, such as summer camp, or they may be taking a long trip or have moved to a different country.

In its mild form, homesickness prompts the development of coping skills and motivates healthy attachment behaviors, such as renewing contact with loved ones. Nearly all people miss something about home when they are away, making homesickness a nearly universal experience. However, intense homesickness can be painful and debilitating.

== Historical references ==
Homesickness is mentioned in ancient fiction and non-fiction tracts. Both the Old Testament books of Exodus and Psalm 137:1 describe it ("By the rivers of Babylon, there we sat down, yea, we wept, when we remembered Zion") as well as Homer's Odyssey, whose opening scene features Athena arguing with Zeus to bring Odysseus home because he is homesick ("...longing for his wife and his homecoming..."). The Greek physician Hippocrates (c. 460 BC–377 BC) believed that homesickness—also called "heimveh" (from German "Heimweh") or a "nostalgic reaction"—was caused by a surfeit of black bile in the blood. In recent history, homesickness is first mentioned specifically with Swiss people being abroad in Europe ("Heimweh") for a longer period of time in a document dating back to 1651. This was a normal phenomenon among the many common Swiss mercenaries serving in different countries and many rulers across Europe at that time. It was not uncommon for them staying many years away from home and, if lucky enough, return home if still alive. This phenomenon at that time was first only thought to affect Swiss people until this was revised, probably caused by big migration streams across Europe suggesting the same symptoms and thus homesickness found its way into general German medical literature in the 19th century.

American contemporary histories, such as Susan J. Matt's Homesickness: An American History, describe experiences of homesickness in colonists, immigrants, gold miners, soldiers, explorers and others spending time away from home. First understood as a brain lesion, homesickness is now known to be a form of normative psychopathology that reflects the strength of a person's attachment to home, native culture and loved ones, as well as their ability to regulate their emotions and adjust to novelty. Cross-cultural research, with populations as diverse as refugees and boarding school students, suggests considerable agreement on the definition of homesickness. Additional historical perspectives on homesickness and place attachment can be found in books by van Tilburg & Vingerhoets, Matt, and Williams.

== Diagnosis and epidemiology ==
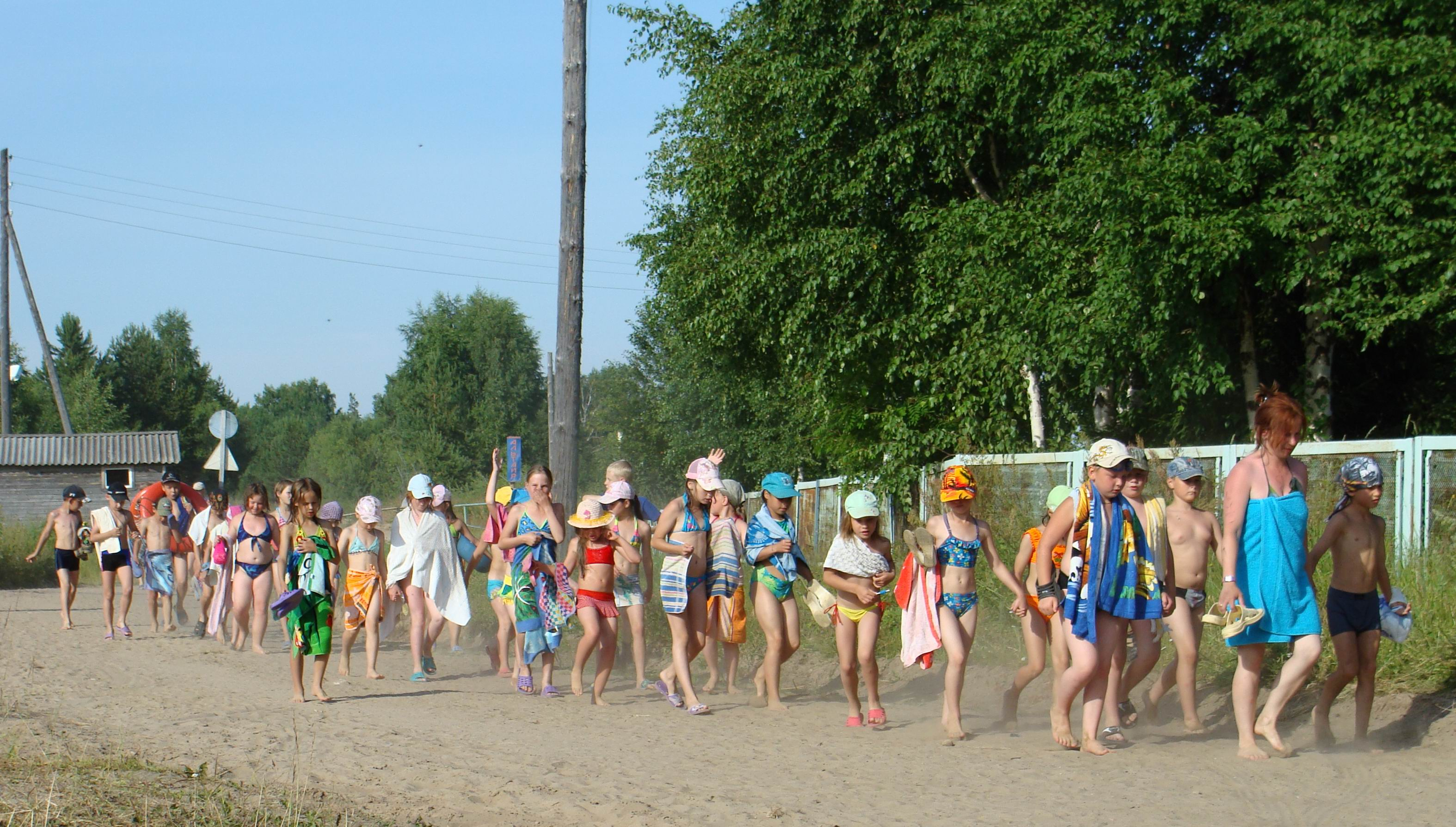
Summer camps for children are often associated with homesickness, particularly for children who are away from their parents for the first time.

Whereas separation anxiety disorder is characterized by "inappropriate and excessive fear or anxiety concerning separation from those to whom the individual is attached" symptoms of homesickness are most prominent after a separation and include both depression and anxiety. In DSM terms, homesickness may be related to separation anxiety disorder, but it is perhaps best categorized as either an adjustment disorder with mixed anxiety and depressed mood (309.28) or, for immigrants and foreign students as a V62.4, Acculturation Difficulty. As noted above, researchers use the following definition: "Homesickness is the distress or impairment caused by an actual or anticipated separation from home. Its cognitive hallmark is preoccupying thoughts of home and attachment objects." Recent pathogenic models support the possibility that homesickness reflects both insecure attachment and a variety of emotional and cognitive vulnerabilities, such as little previous experience away from home and negative attitudes about the novel environment.

The prevalence of homesickness varies and depends on the population studied and the way homesickness is measured. One way to conceptualize homesickness prevalence is as a function of severity. Nearly all people miss something about home when they are away, so the absolute prevalence of homesickness is close to 100%, mostly in a mild form. Roughly 20% of university students and children at summer camp rate themselves at or above the midpoint on numerical rating scales of homesickness severity. 5–7% of students and campers report intense homesickness associated with severe symptoms of anxiety and depression. In adverse or painful environments, such as the hospital or the battlefield, intense homesickness is far more prevalent. In one study, 50% of hostpitalized children scored themselves at or above the midpoint on a numerical homesickness intensity scale (compared to 20% of children at summer camp). Soldiers report even more intense homesickness, sometimes to the point of suicidal misery. Aversive environmental elements, such as the trauma associated with war, exacerbate homesickness and other mental health problems. Homesickness is a normative pathology that can take on clinical relevance in its moderate and severe forms.

== Risk and protective factors ==
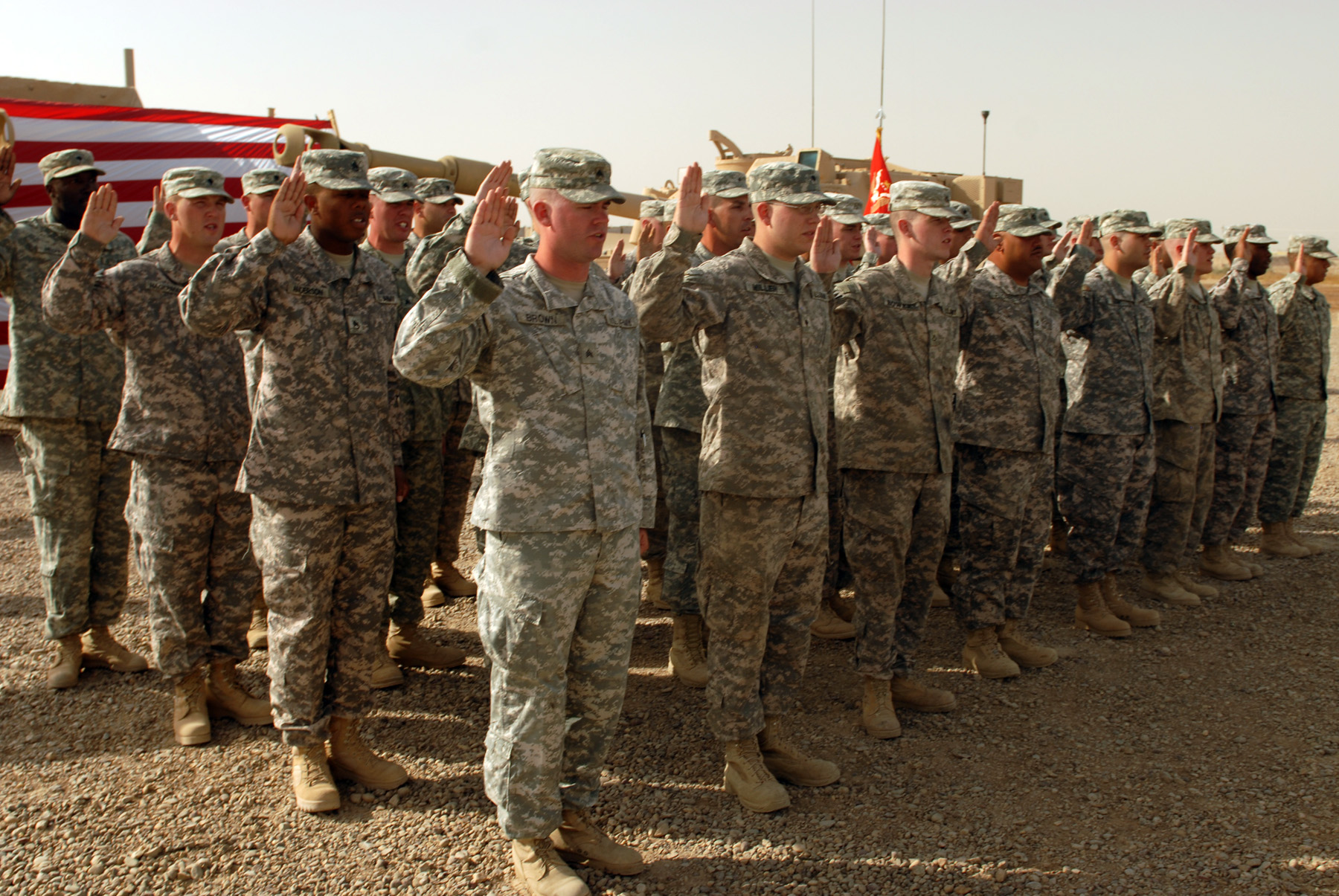
Newly enlisted soldiers sometimes experience homesickness when they are staying in an army boot camp.

Risk factors (constructs which increase the likelihood or intensity of homesickness) and protective factors (constructs that decrease the likelihood or intensity of homesickness) vary by population. For example, seafarers on board, the environmental stressors associated with a hospital, a military boot camp or a foreign country may exacerbate homesickness and complicate treatment. Generally speaking, however, risk and protective factors transcend age and environment.

=== Risk factors ===
The risk factors for homesickness fall into five categories: experience, personality, family, attitude and environment. More is known about some of these factors in adults—especially personality factors—because more homesickness research has been performed with older populations. However, a growing body of research is elucidating the etiology of homesickness in younger populations, including children at summer camp, hospitalized children and students.

- Experience factors: Younger age; little previous experience away from home (for which age can be a proxy); little or no previous experience in the novel environment; little or no previous experience venturing out without primary caregivers.
- Attitude factors: The belief that homesickness will be strong; negative first impressions and low expectations for the new environment; perceived absence of social support; high perceived demands (e.g., on academic, vocational or sports performance); great perceived distance from home
- Personality factors: Insecure attachment relationship with primary caregivers; low perceived control over the timing and nature of the separation from home; anxious or depressed feelings in the months prior to the separation; low self-directedness; high harm avoidance; rigidity; a wishful-thinking coping style.
- Family factors: decision control (e.g., caregivers forcing young children to spend time away from home against their wishes);

=== Protective factors ===
Factors which mitigate the prevalence or intensity of homesickness are essentially the inverse of the risk factors cited above. Effective coping (reviewed in the following section) also diminishes the intensity of homesickness over time. Prior to a separation, however, key protective factors can be identified. Positive adjustment to separation from home is generally associated with the following factors:

- Experience factors: Older age; substantial previous experience away from home (for which age can be a proxy); previous experience in the novel environment; previous experience venturing out without primary caregivers.
- Attitude factors: The belief that homesickness will be mild; positive first impressions and high expectations for the new environment; perceptions of social support; low perceived demands (e.g., on academic or vocational performance); short perceived distance from home
- Personality factors: Secure attachment relationship with primary caregivers; high perceived control over the timing and nature of the separation from home; good mental health in the months prior to the separation; high self-directedness; adventure-seeking; flexibility; an instrumental coping style.
- Family factors: High decision control (e.g., caregivers including a young person in the decision to spend time away from home); individuals making their own choice about military service; supportive caregiving; caregivers who express confidence and optimism about the separation (e.g., "Have a great time away. I know you'll do great.")
- Environmental factors: Low cultural contrast (e.g., same language, similar customs, familiar food in the new environment); physical and emotional safety; few changes to familiar daily schedule; plenty of information about the new place prior to relocation; feeling welcome and accepted in the new place.

== Theories of coping ==
Many psychologists argue that research into the causes of homesickness is valuable for three reasons. First, homesickness is experienced by millions of people who spend time away from home (see McCann, 1941, for an early review) including children at boarding schools, residential summer camps and hospitals.

Second, severe homesickness is associated with significant distress and impairment. There is evidence that homesick persons present with non-traumatic physical ailments significantly more than their non-homesick peers. Homesick boys and girls complain about somatic problems and exhibit more internalising and externalising behaviours problems than their non-homesick peers. First-year college students are three times more likely to drop out of school than their non-homesick peers. Other data have pointed to concentration and academic problems in homesick students. And maladjustment to separation from home has been documented in hospitalized young people and is generally associated with slower recovery. See Thurber & Walton (2012) for a review.

Third, learning more about how people cope with homesickness is a helpful guide to designing treatment programs. By complementing existing theories of depression, anxiety and attachment, a better theoretical understanding of homesickness can shape applied interventions. Among the most relevant theories that could shape interventions are those concerned with Learned Helplessness and Control Beliefs.

Learned helplessness predicts that persons who develop a belief that they cannot influence or adjust to their circumstance of separation from home will become depressed and make fewer attempts to change that circumstance. Control beliefs theory predicts that negative affect is most likely in persons who perceive personal incompetence in the separation environment (e.g., poor social skills at a summer camp or university) and who perceive contingency uncertainty (e.g., uncertainty about whether friendly behavior will garner friends). Although these are not the only broad etiologic theories that inform homesickness, both theories hinge on control, the perception of which "reflects the fundamental human need for competence" (Skinner, 1995, p. 8). This is particularly relevant to coping, because people's choice of how to respond to a stressor hinges partly on their perception of a stressor's controllability.

An equally important coping factor is social connection, which for many people is the antidote to homesickness. As the results of several studies have suggested, social connection is a powerful mediator of homesickness intensity.

=== Ways of coping ===
The most effective way of coping with homesickness is mixed and layered. Mixed coping is that which involves both primary goals (changing circumstances) and secondary goals (adjusting to circumstances). Layered coping is that which involves more than one method. This kind of sophisticated coping is learned through experience, such as brief periods away from home without parents. As an example of mixed and layered coping, one study revealed the following method-goal combinations to be the most frequent and effective ways for boys and girls:

- Doing something fun (observable method) to forget about being homesick (secondary goal)
- Thinking positively and feel grateful (unobservable method) to feel better (secondary goal)
- Simply changing feelings and attitudes (unobservable method) to be happy (secondary goal)
- Reframing time (unobservable method) in order to perceive the time away as shorter (secondary goal)
- Renewing a connection with home, through letter writing (observable method) to feel closer to home (secondary goal)
- Talking with someone (observable method) who could provide support and help them make new friends (primary goal)

Sometimes, people will engage in wishful thinking, attempt to arrange a shorter stay or (rarely) break rules or act violently in order to be sent home. These ways of coping are rarely effective and can produce unintended negative side effects.

== See also ==
- Nostalgia
- Third culture kid
- Sehnsucht
- Hiraeth
- Saudade
- Separation anxiety disorder
- Culture shock
