= Itaú Cultural =

Cultural institute in São Paulo, Brazil

Instituto Itaú Cultural
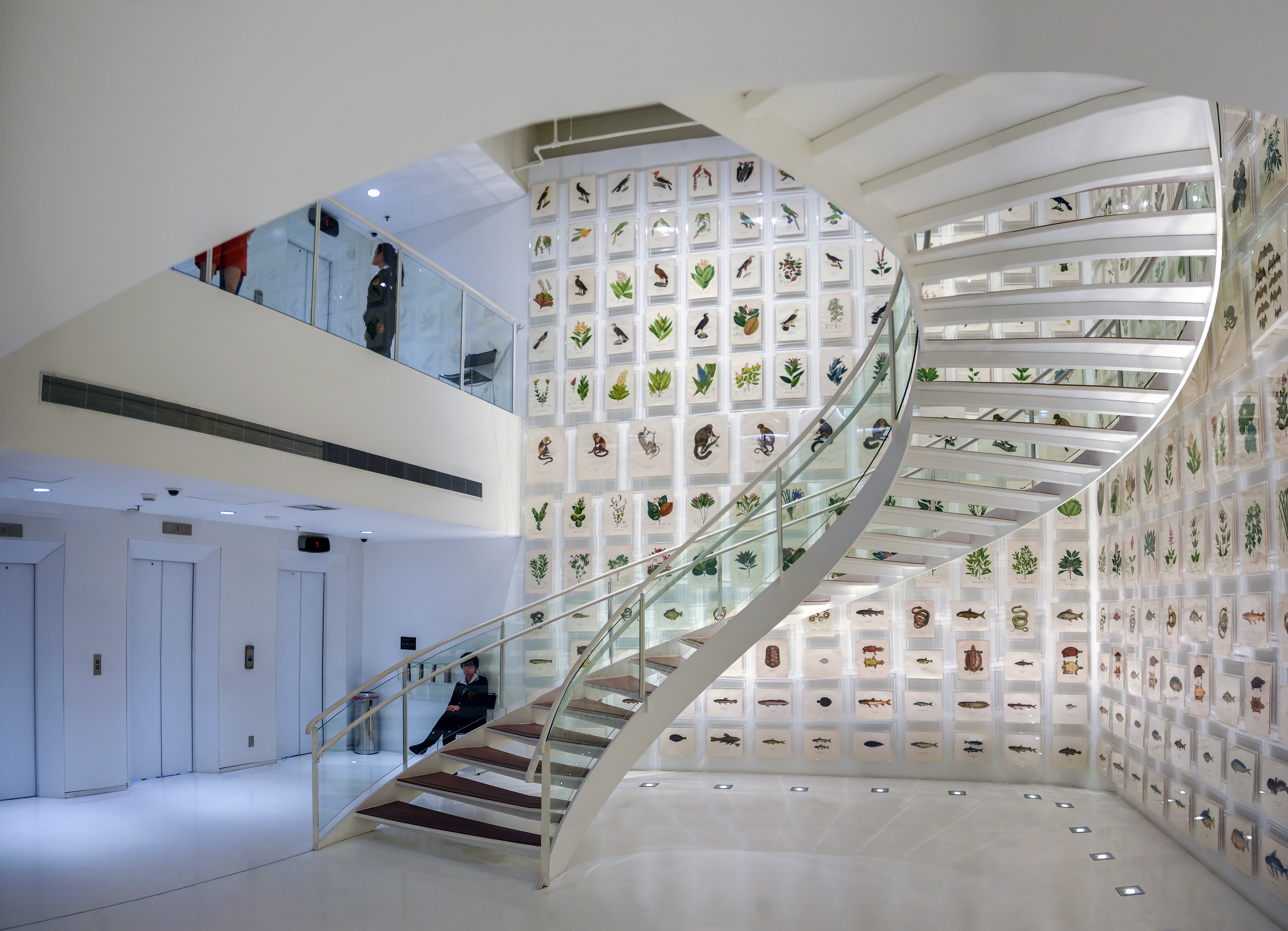
- Established: 1987
- Location: São Paulo
- Type: Cultural research, production and mapping
- Director: Milú Villela
- Website: itaucultural.org.br

Instituto Itaú Cultural is a Brazilian not-for-profit cultural institute owned by Itaú Unibanco. The institute was founded by Olavo Egydio Setúbal and created under the Law nº 7505, of 3 October 1986. The institute's goal is to map artistic manifestations and to foster artistic research and production related to all cultural sections.

Itaú Cultural holds the program Rumos for cultural research, cataloguing manifestations in visual arts, film, dance, literature, theater, and music, among others. It also organizes the Emoção Art.ficial biennial of art and technology and the Enciclopédia Itaú Cultural online encyclopedia.

== History ==
Itaú Cultural Institute was founded in 1987 under the name Centro de Informática e Cultura (lit. 'Center of Computer Science and Culture') and opened to the public on 5 October 1989. Its electronic database was open to visitors, a first in Latin America.

In 1997 the first edition of the Rumos program was held. One year later, the institution adopted the name Instituto Itaú Cultural.

== Collections ==
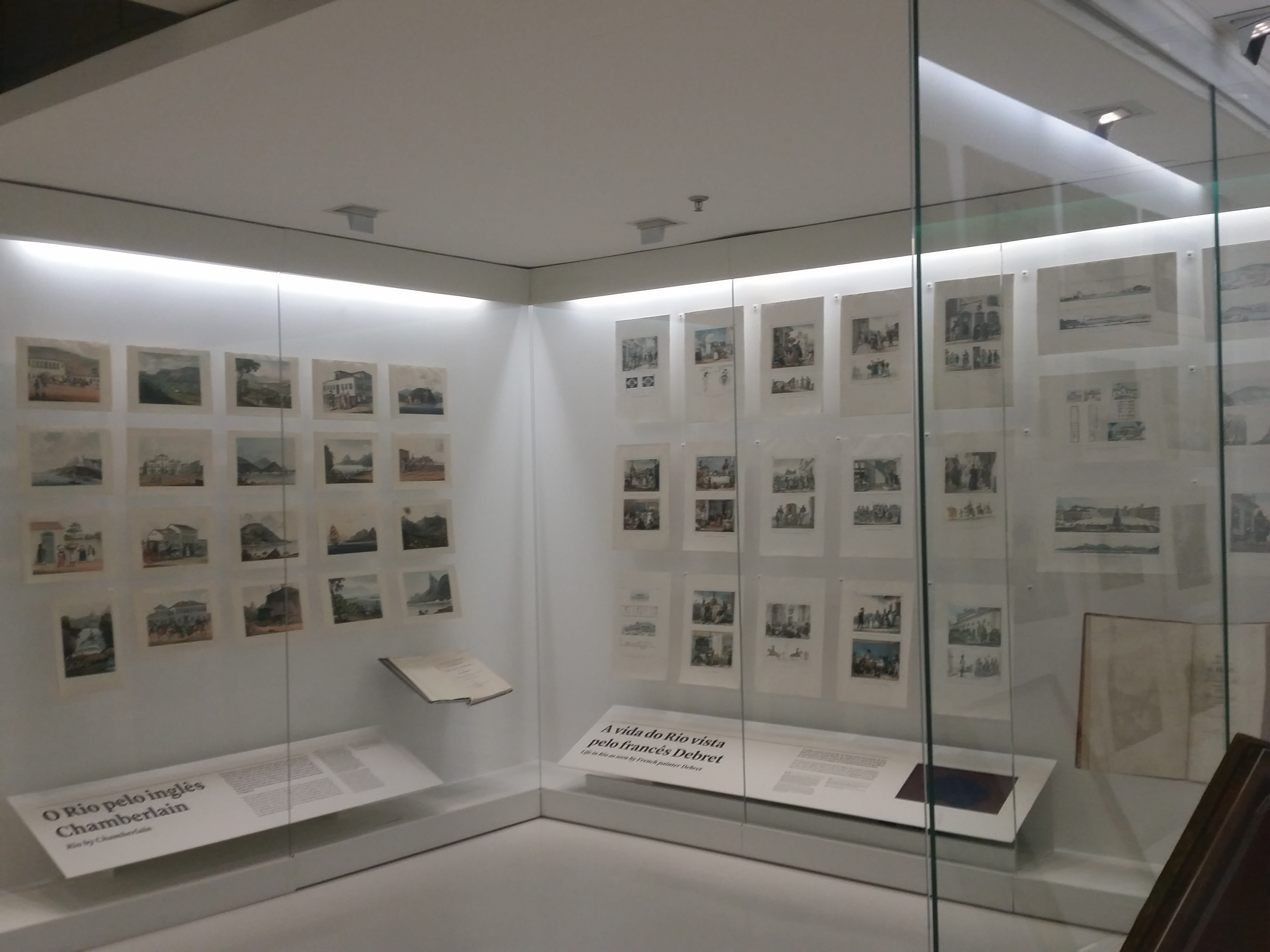
Acervo Coleção Brasiliana

The institute holds two permanent exhibitions: Brasiliana, presenting paintings, drawings, engravings, maps and documents depicting Brazil from the arrival of the colonists, and Numismática, exhibiting gold coins and bars produced as far back as the time of Portuguese rule in Brazil and as recent as the present day. A wall with 300 engravings on one of the floors, regarding the Brazilian flora and fauna, is part of the exhibition.

== Some temporary exhibitions ==
- Convite à Viagem (2012)
- Emoção Art.ficial 6.0 (2012)
- Ocupação Sergio Britto (2013)
- Waldemar Cordeiro: Fantasia Exata (2013)
- Ocupação Mário de Andrade (2013)
- Rumos Cinema e Vídeo – Linguagens Expandidas (2013)
- Ocupação Nelson Pereira dos Santos (2013)
- Fotonovela: Sociedade/Classes/Fotografia (2013)
- Cidade Gráfica (2014)
- A Arte da Lembrança – A Saudade na Fotografia Brasileira (2015)
- Ocupação Dona Ivone Lara (2015)
- Ocupação Elomar (2015)
- Do Objeto para o Mundo – Coleção Inhotim (2015)
- Ocupação João das Neves (2015)
- Sérgio Camargo: Luz e Matéria (2015)
- Ocupação Grupo Corpo (2015)
- Ocupação Person (2016)
- Arquivo Ex Machina: Arquivo e Identidade na América Latina (2016)
- Calder e a Arte Brasileira (2016)
- Mostra Diálogos Ausentes (2016)

== See also ==
- CAIXA Cultural São Paulo
