= Centro Cultural da Penha =

Cultural center in Penha, São Paulo, Brazil

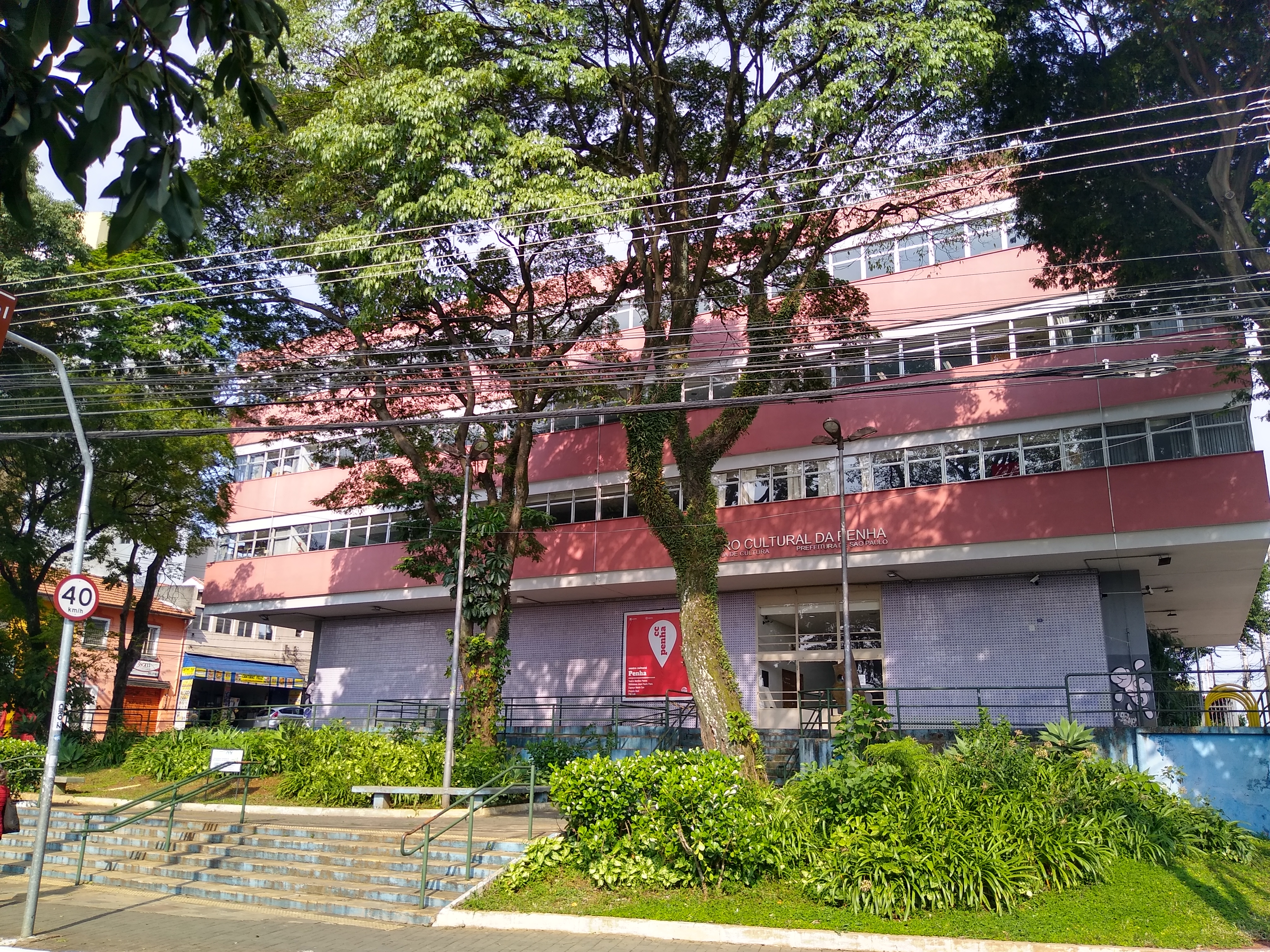
- The center's exterior in 2020

- Location within São Paulo Location within Brazil
- Address: Largo do Rosário, number 20
- Location: Penha, São Paulo, Brazil
- Coordinates: 23°31′31.98″S 46°32′54.68″W
- Type: Cultural center

Construction
- Built: 1970
- Renovated: December 2012

Centro Cultural da Penha is a cultural center, a public facility aimed at the dissemination of culture, the spread knowledge and the appreciation of the history of the Penha (São Paulo) neighborhood where it is located. The site is connected to the Department of Cultural Expansion, the Secretary of Culture of the Municipality of São Paulo. It consists of the Mario Zan Cultural Space, Library José Paulo Paes, Theatre Martins Pena, the telecentre, recording studio Itamar Assumption, and study rooms on every floor of the building.

The Centro Cultural da Penha is located at Largo do Rosário, number 20, in the Penha neighborhood, east of the city of São Paulo, State of São Paulo, Brazil. It is located 160 meters (520 ft) from the Shopping Center Penha, 1,500 meters (4,900 ft) from the Station Penha of the São Paulo’s Metrô and 9,500 meters (31,200 ft) from the Praça da Sé.

== History ==
The building, built in 1970, has four floors and occupies an area of 3,511.93 square metres (37,802.1 sq ft). With investments of over R$3 million, provided by the Municipal Department of Culture, the building underwent extensive renovation in its structure, interior and equipment, which was completed and delivered to the public in December 2012.

== Facilities ==
=== Cultural Space Mario Zan ===
The Cultural Space Mario Zan is reserved for training workshops, soirees, artistic meetings, parley, among others. It has three rehearsal rooms and a study room, preferably intended for artistic and educational activities such as research projects, group meetings, dramatic reading, and forming a collective of artists.

=== Library José Paulo Paes ===
The library has a collection of more than 34,000 items. With the strong historical influence of Afro-Brazilian culture in the Penha neighborhood, the library features an extensive collection on the subject, as well as proposed activities directed to Afro-Brazilian and African languages courses.

=== Martins Pena Theatre ===
The Theatre Martins Pena has capacity for an audience of 198 people, a place of cultural reference in the region. Opened on September 7, 2012, it has diversified program for both children and adult audiences.

=== Telecentre ===
The telecentre offers people access to the internet, free training courses for technicians and digital inclusion. It can also be used for projects in digital media.

=== Recording studio Itamar Assumption ===
The studio Itamar Assumption has two recording rooms - one individual and another to bands with instruments and equipment. The use of the studio should be scheduled and can be used free for bands and artists in general with or without experiments.

== See also ==
- CAIXA Cultural São Paulo
