= Bertha Worms =

Brazilian artist (1868–1937)

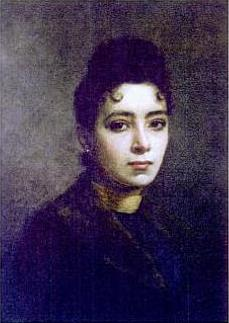
- Self-portrait (c. 1893)
- Born: Anna Clémence Bertha Abraham Worms; February 26, 1868; Uckange, France
- Died: June 27, 1937 (aged 69); São Paulo, Brazil
- Known for: Painting
- Style: Genre and portrait paintings

Anna Clémence Bertha Abraham Worms (26 February 1868 – 27 June 1937) was a French-born Brazilian art professor and painter of genre scenes and portraits.

== Biography ==
She was born in Uckange in the Moselle region of France to a Jewish family. At the age of thirteen, she began painting and enrolled at the École des Beaux-Arts in Paris, where she studied with Tony Robert-Fleury, Gustave Boulanger and Benjamin Constant. At the age of seventeen, she obtained a degree as a teacher of drawing from the Ministry of Public Instruction and taught in the communal schools.

In 1892, she married Fernando Samuel Worms, a Brazilian dental surgeon. She went with him when he returned to Brazil and lived in the southern part of the country for two years. In 1894, they settled in São Paulo, where she established a drawing and painting course, organizing yearly exhibits for her students.

In 1895, she had a major showing at the Salão Nacional de Belas Artes in Rio de Janeiro, winning a gold medal. In 1911, she participated in the first Exposição Brasileira de Belas Artes, held at the São Paulo School of Arts and Crafts, contributing three works. In 1922, she presented several works at the Comemorativa do Centenário da Independência, held at the Palácio das Indústrias in São Paulo. The following year, she held a joint exhibition with her son, the painter and sculptor, Gastão Worms.

She died on 27 June 1937 in São Paulo.

== Selected paintings ==
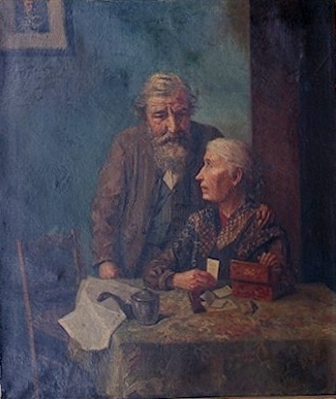
Do You Remember?

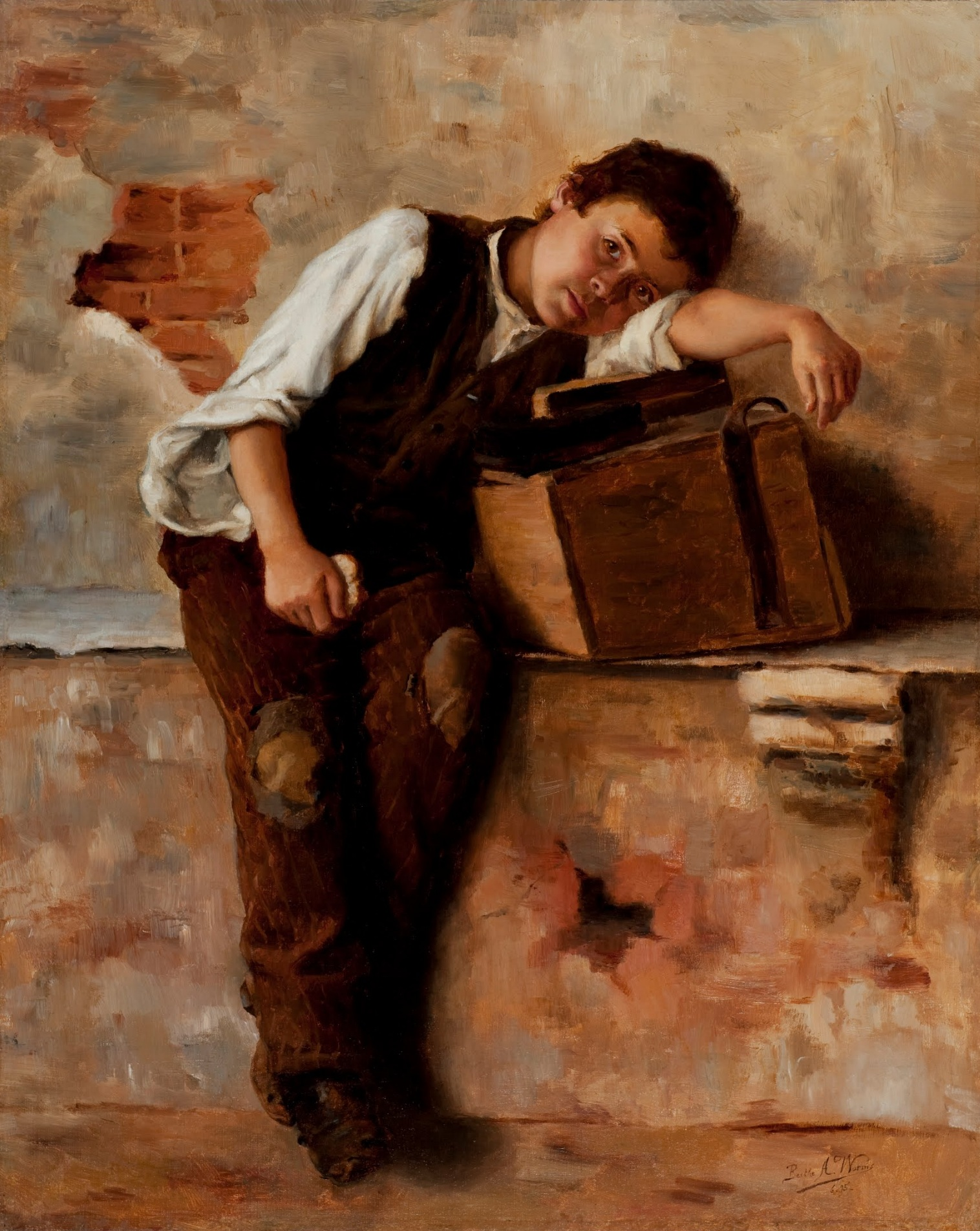
Homesick for Naples

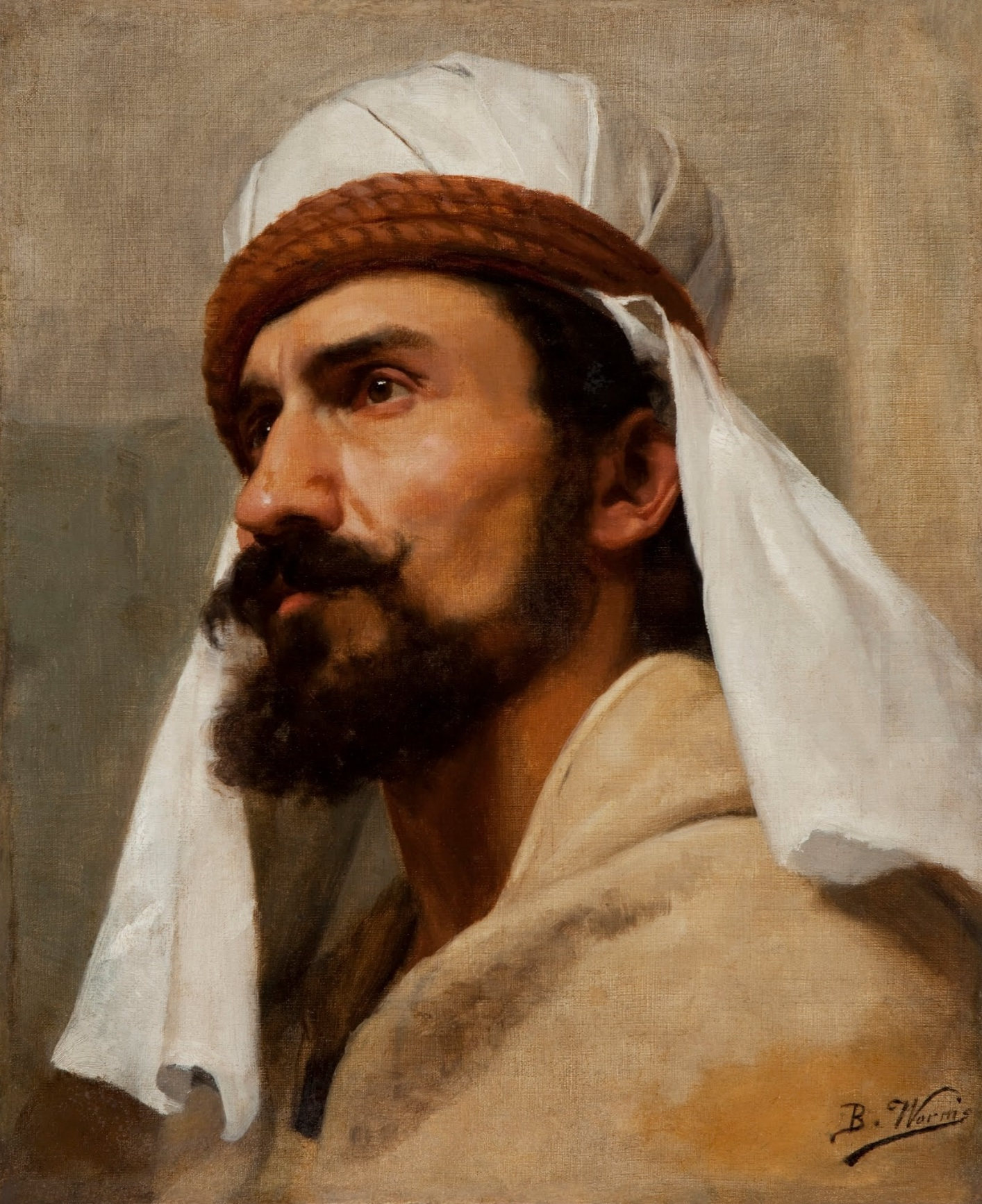
Bedouin

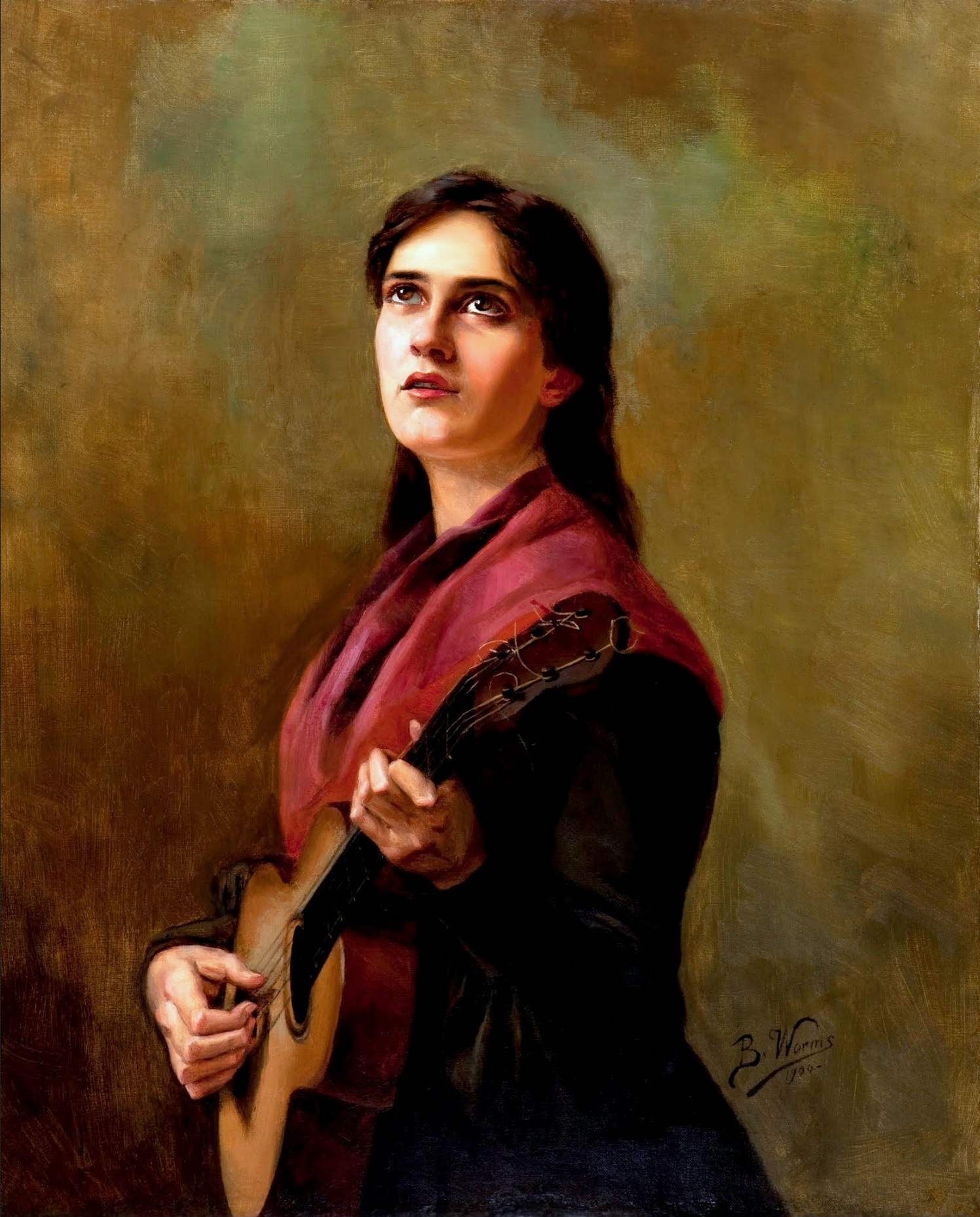
Sentimental Song

== Sources ==
- Biography, works, and sources @ the Enciclopédia Itaú Cultural
- A Pinacoteca do Estado. Text by Carlos Alberto Cerqueira Lemos, Paulo Mendes da Rocha, Maria Cecília França Lourenço; presentation by Ricardo Ohtake, Emanoel Araújo; research by Malú Grima, Sandra Regina Gonçalves, Lucila de Sá Carneiro, Carlos Dal Rovere Júnior, Carmem Correa, José de Oliveira Júnior, Paulo de Tarso. São Paulo: Banco Safra, 1994. 319 pgs.
- PROFISSÃO ARTISTA: Pintoras e Escultoras Acadêmicas Brasileiras, Text by Ana Paula Cavalcanti Simioni. São Paulo: Editora Universidade de São Paulo: 2008. p. 231 ISBN 978-85-314-1075-8
