= Centro Cultural Banco do Brasil =

Bank of Brazil Cultural Center
- Centro Cultural Banco do Brasil
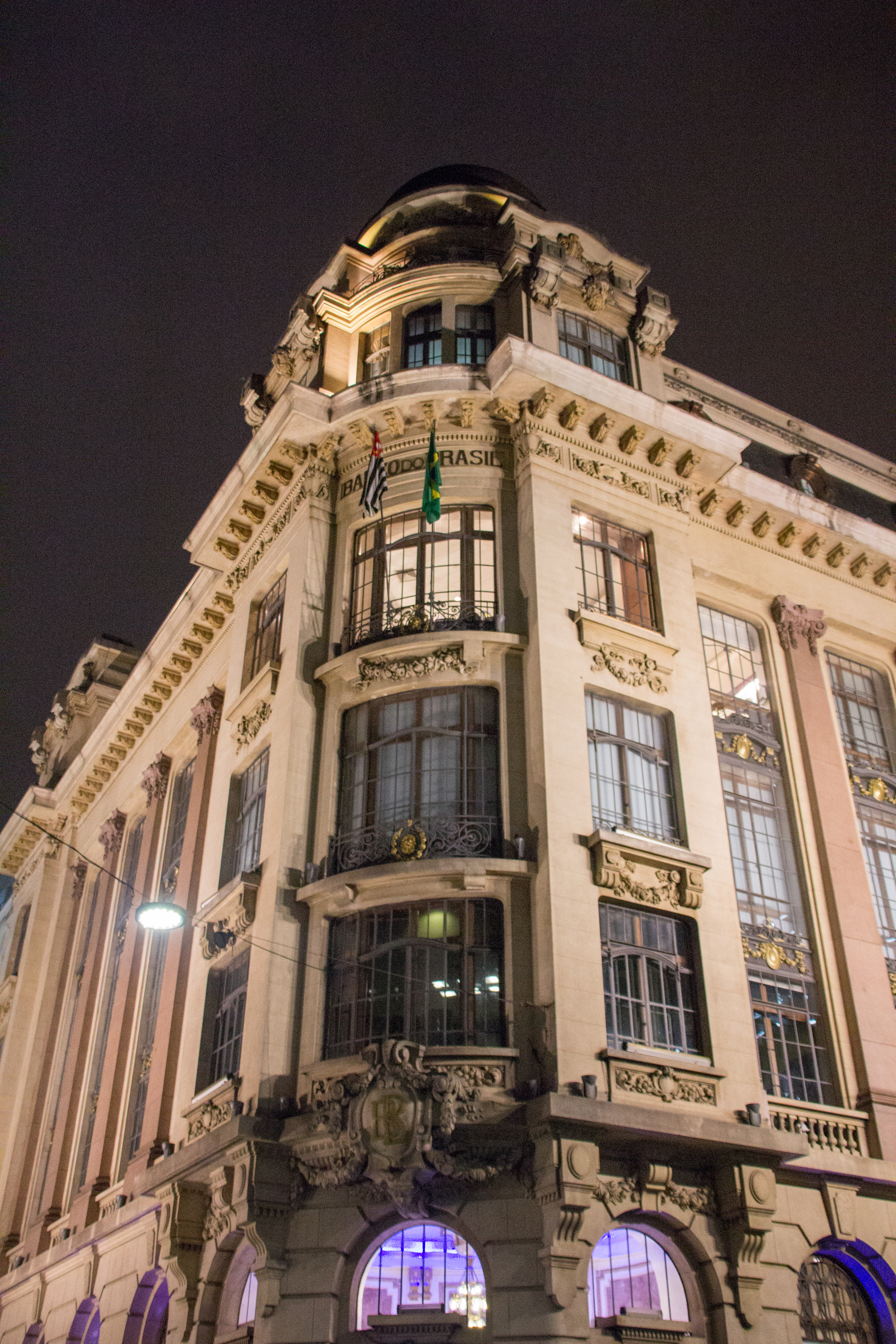
- The CCBB building in São Paulo
- Established: 12 October 1989 (Rio de Janeiro); 12 October 2000 (Brasília); 21 April 2001 (São Paulo); 27 August 2013 (Belo Horizonte)
- Location: Belo Horizonte, Brasília, Rio de Janeiro and São Paulo
- Website: ccbb.com.br

The Centro Cultural Banco do Brasil (CCBB, in English: Bank of Brazil Cultural Center) is a cultural organization of the Bank of Brazil based in Brazil with centers in Belo Horizonte, Brasília, Rio de Janeiro and São Paulo.

The CCBB began in 1986. It opened in Rio de Janeiro in 1989, Brasília in 2000, São Paulo in 2001 and Belo Horizonte in 2013. Its three centers in Rio de Janeiro, Brasilia, and São Paulo are among the top hundred most visited art museums. In 2013, the three centers combined had 4.4 million visitors: 2,034,397 visitors in Rio de Janeiro, 1,468,818 visitors in Brasília, and 931,639 visitors in São Paulo.

The largest of the CCBB institutions is located in Rio de Janeiro, in an Art Deco building designed by Francisco Joaquim Bethencourt da Silva. Similar in size is the São Paulo institution, designed in the same style by Hippolyto Pujol. The smallest of the four complexes is the Brasília branch, designed by Alba Rabelo Cunha. Both the Rio de Janeiro and São Paulo branches contain theatres, cinemas, and multiple art galleries.

== Gallery ==
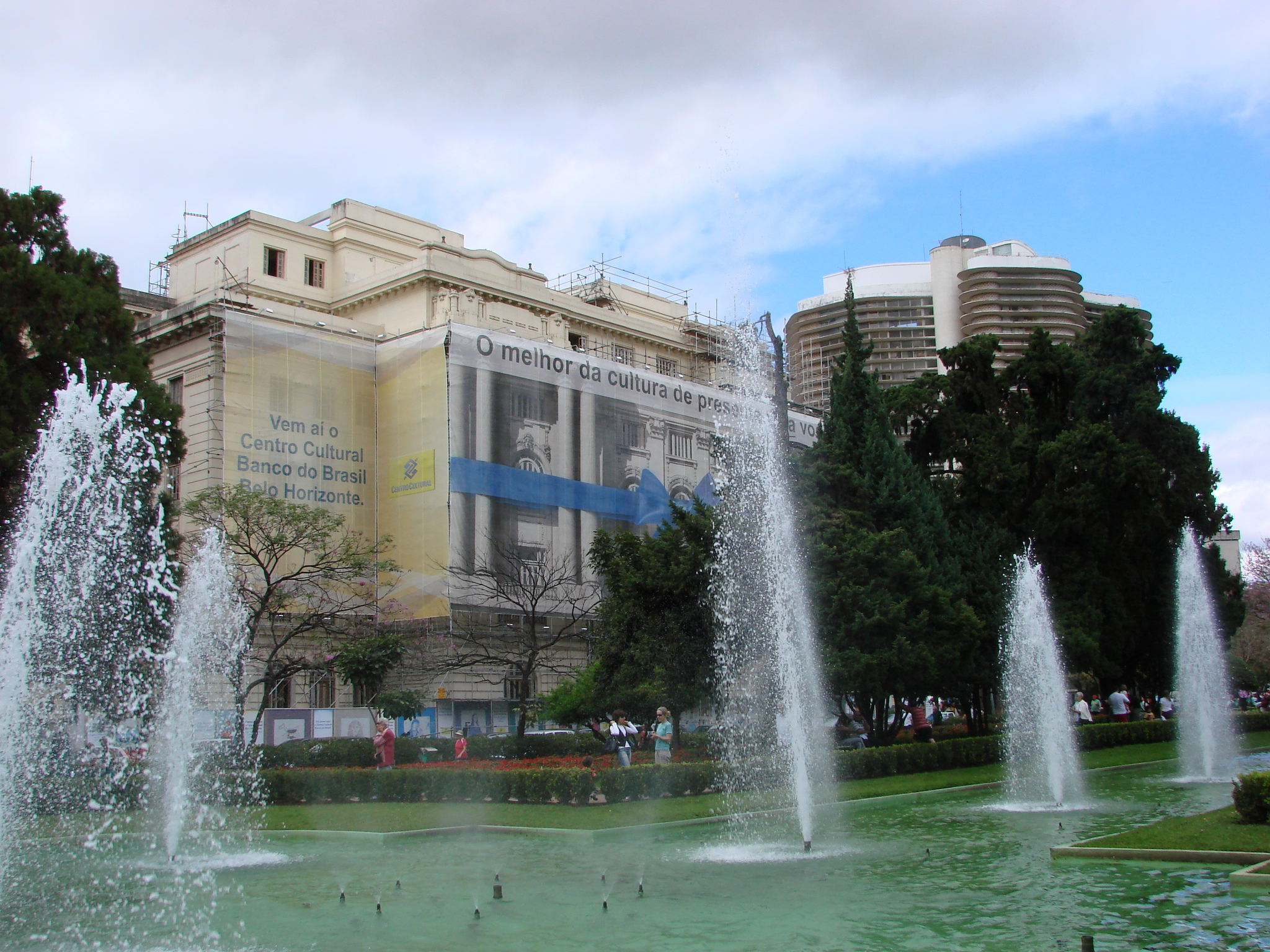
CCBB in Belo Horizonte

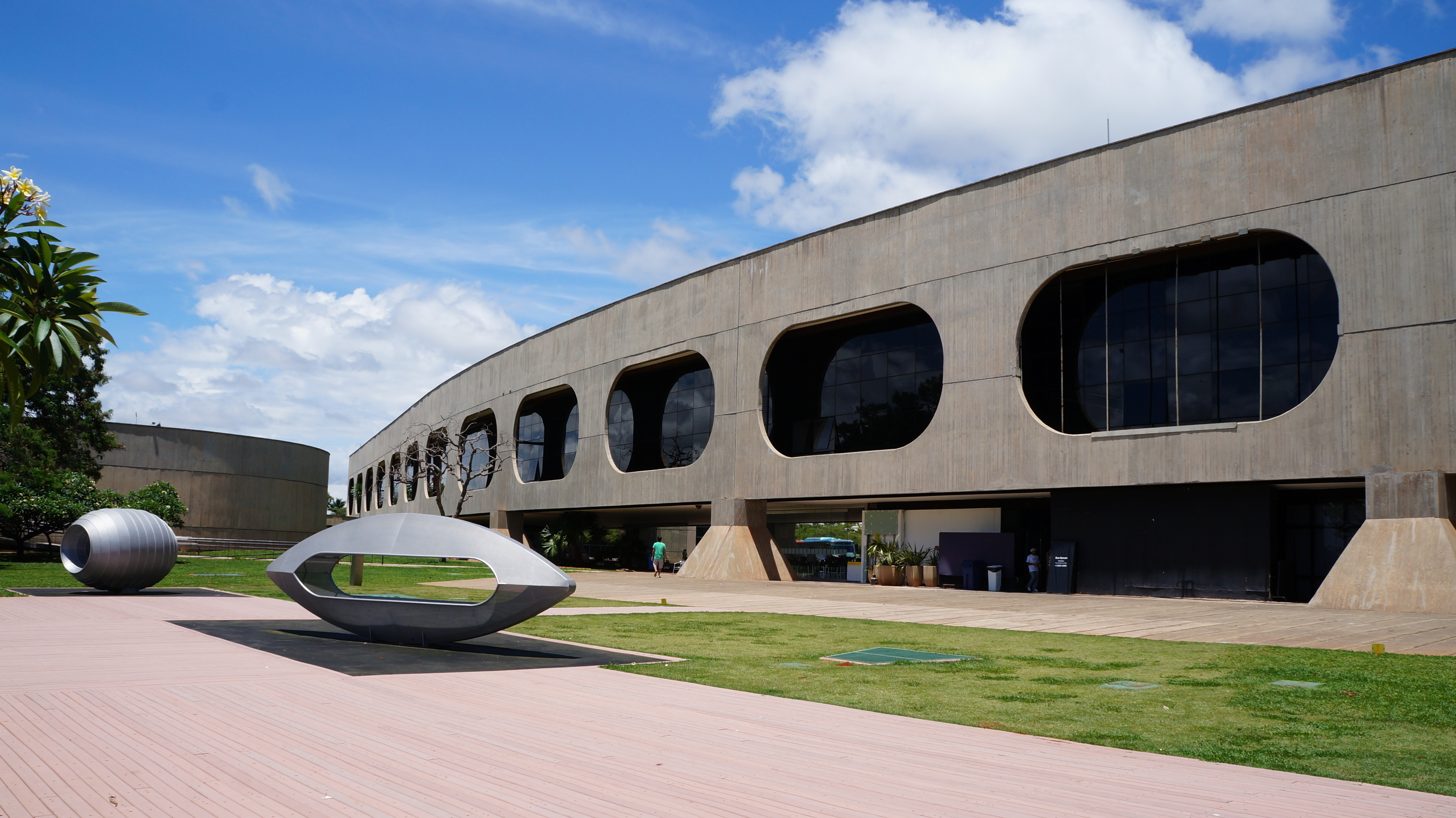
CCBB in Brasília

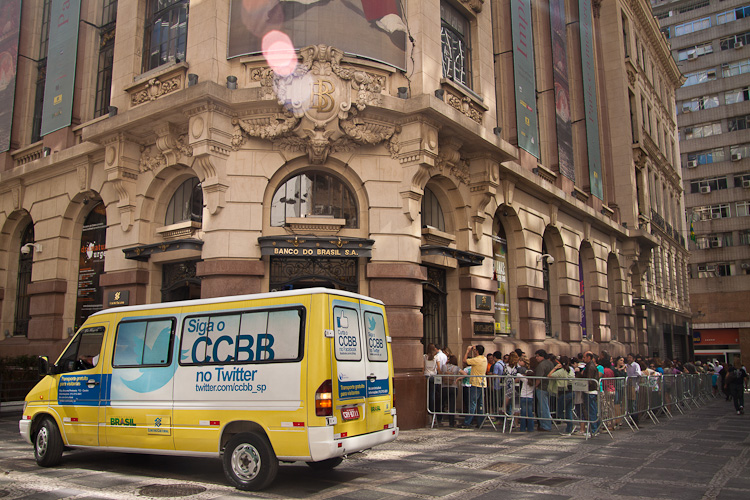
CCBB in São Paulo

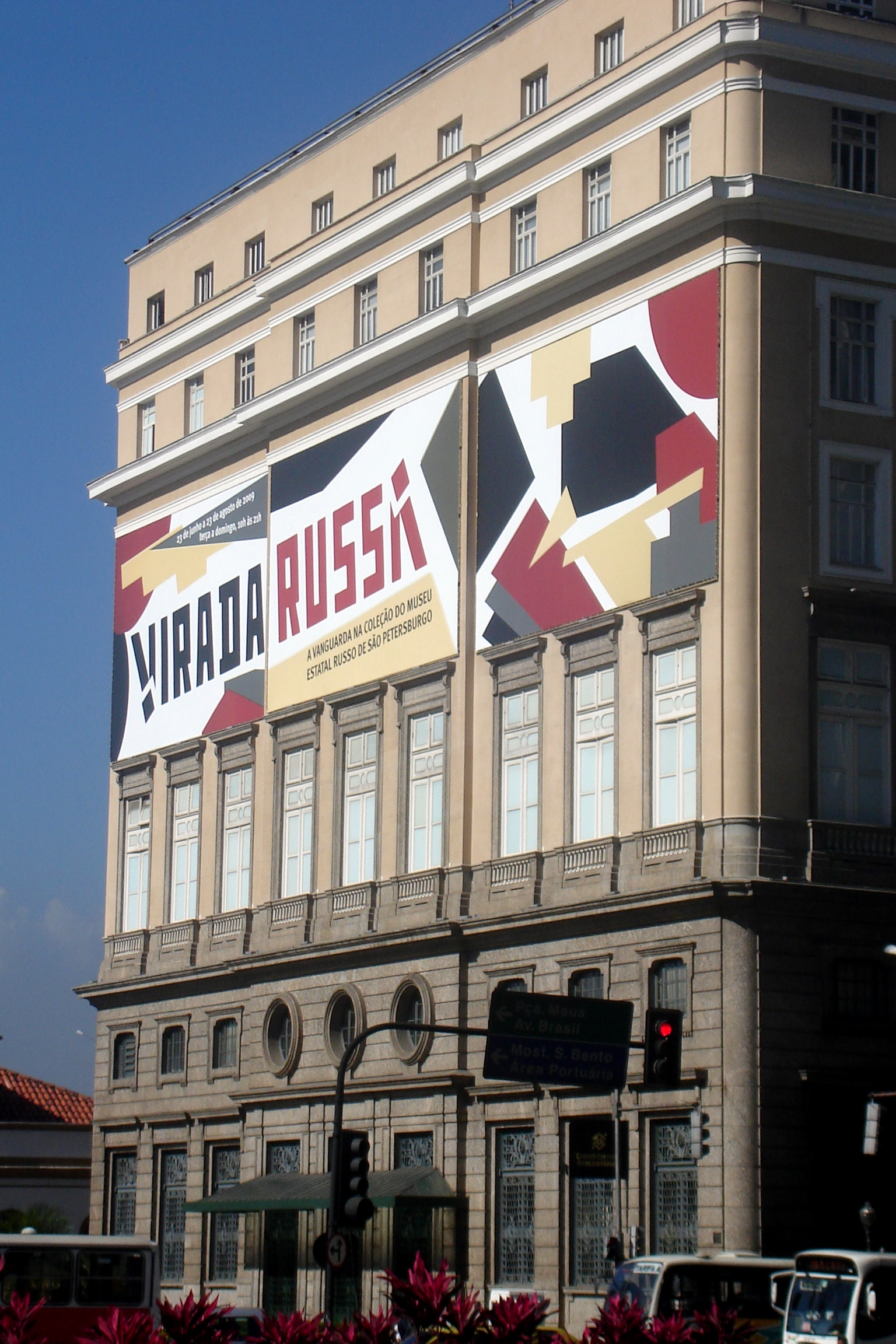
CCBB in Rio de Janeiro

== See also ==
- Cultural center
- CAIXA Cultural São Paulo
- São Paulo Cultural Center
