= Banco do Brasil Cultural Center (Rio de Janeiro) =

Cultural space in Rio de Janeiro, Brazil

- Centro Cultural Banco do Brasil
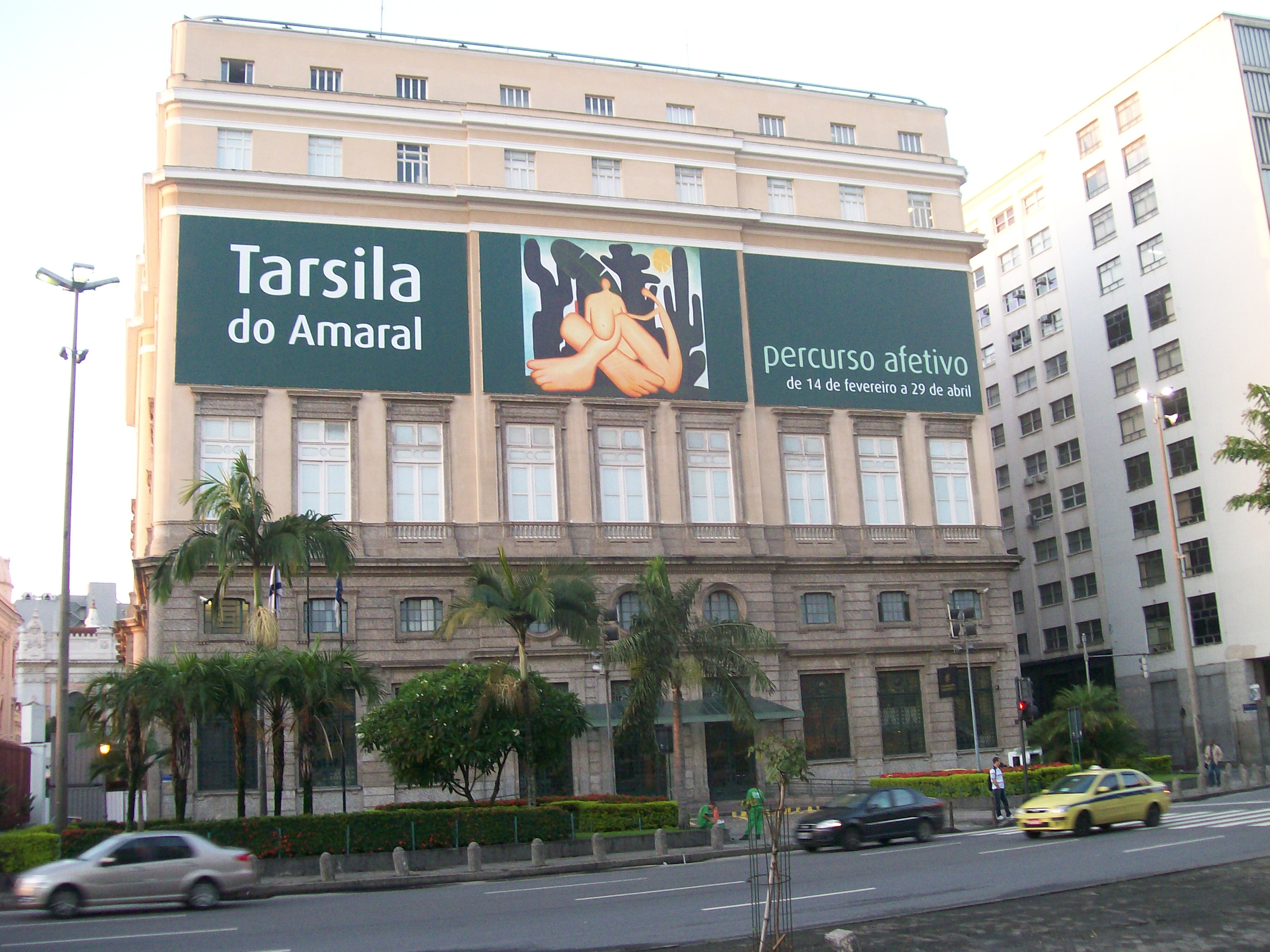
- Facade of the building

- Location within Rio de Janeiro Location within Brazil
- Established: 1989
- Location: Rio de Janeiro, Rio de Janeiro; Brazil
- Coordinates: 22°54′2.794″S 43°10′35.183″W
- Type: Cultural center
- Website: https://ccbb.com.br/rio-de-janeiro/sobre-o-ccbb/

The Banco do Brasil Cultural Center (Portuguese: Centro Cultural Banco do Brasil) in Rio de Janeiro, also known as CCBB Rio de Janeiro or CCBB RJ, is located on Primeiro de Março Street, opposite Largo da Candelária, in the Central Zone of the city, and has a built-up area of 19,243 square meters. It belongs to a complex of cultural spaces managed and maintained by Banco do Brasil.

According to a survey published by The Art Newspaper in April 2014, the CCBB RJ was considered the 21st most visited art museum in the world, attracting a total of 2,034,397 visitors in 2013. According to the same portal, the exhibition Picasso and Spanish Modernity, held at the cultural center, was considered the most visited post-impressionist and modern exhibition in the world in 2015.

== History ==
The cultural center building was designed by architect Francisco Joaquim Béthencourt da Silva, founder of the Sociedade Propagadora das Belas-Artes and the Rio de Janeiro School of Arts and Crafts (Liceu de Artes e Ofícios do Rio de Janeiro). Construction began in 1880; in 1906 it was inaugurated as the headquarters of the Commercial Association of Rio de Janeiro (Associação Comercial do Rio de Janeiro). In the 1920s, Banco do Brasil acquired the building and converted it into its own headquarters. In 1960, it became the seat of the Central Branch and, later, of the Primeiro de Março Branch.

Launched on October 12, 1989, CCBB RJ was idealized in 1986 during the presidency of Camilo Calazans de Magalhães at Banco do Brasil. It was the first museum opened in the CCBB network. The renovation project preserved the elegance of the columns, the ornaments and the marble that ascends the stairs from the lobby, and involved work on the dome over the rotunda. Subsequently, other centers were inaugurated in the cities of Belo Horizonte (2013), Brasília (2000) and São Paulo (2001).

== Features ==
Inside the building, the CCBB RJ occupies 15,046 square meters out of a total constructed area of 19,243 square meters. The structure includes different spaces such as: rooms for exhibitions on the first and second floors; a 110-seat cinema on the first floor; a 53-seat room for video screenings on the mezzanine; three theaters, one on the first floor with 175 seats, and two more on the second floor, one with 158 seats and the other without fixed seats for alternative shows; a 90-seat auditorium on the fourth floor; and a library on the fifth floor.

== Gallery ==
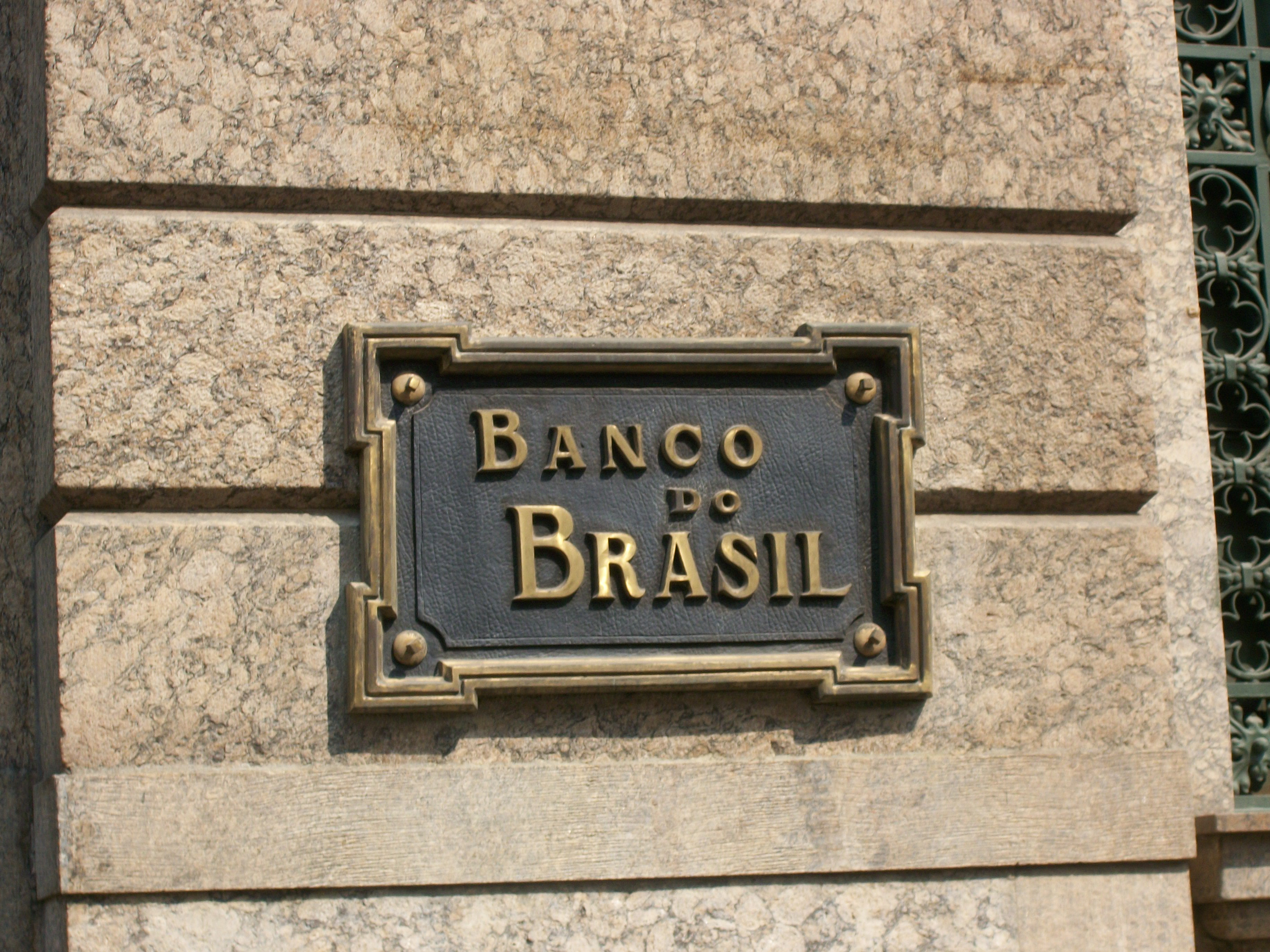
Banco do Brasil plaque placed on the building.

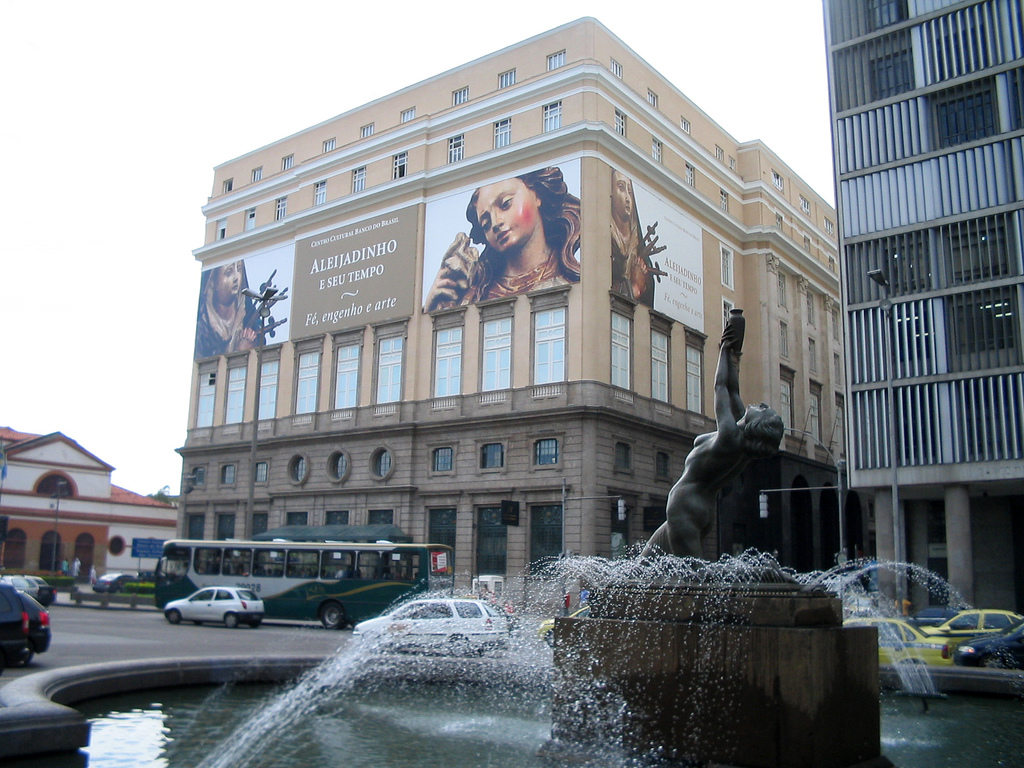
Facade of the CCBB RJ in 2008.

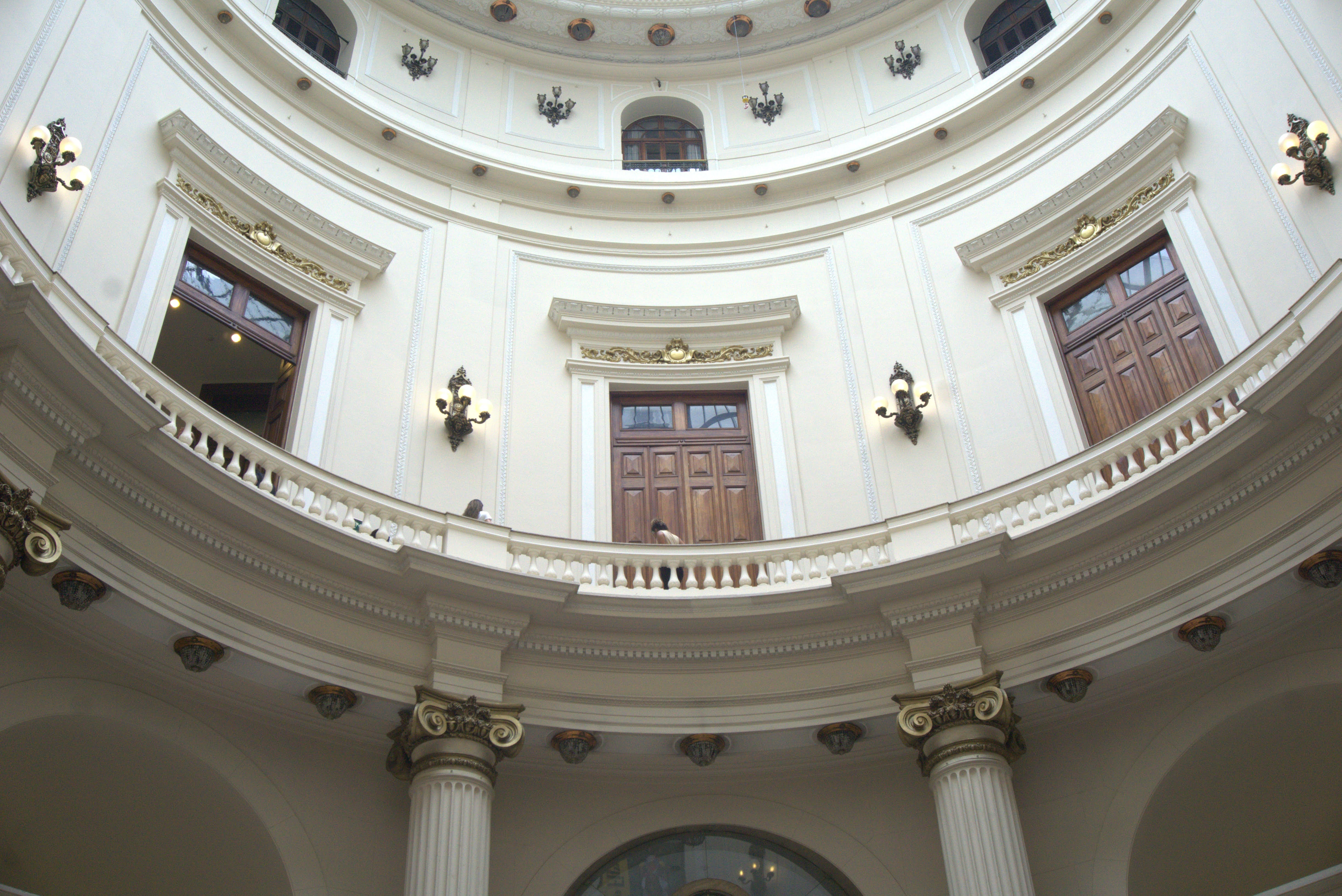
Inside the CCBB RJ.

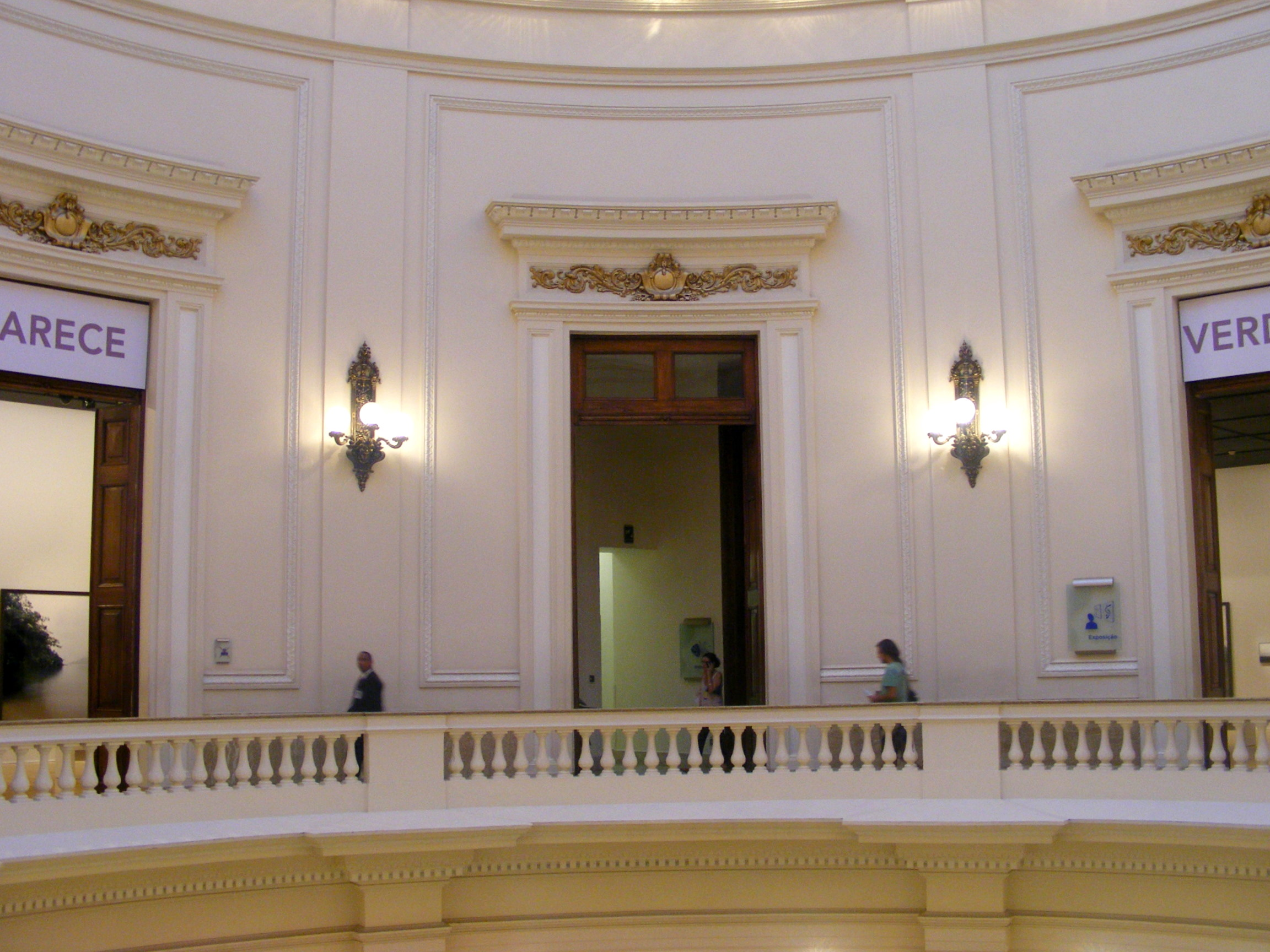
Inside the CCBB RJ.

== See also ==
- Banco do Brasil Cultural Center
- Cultural center
