= Enciclopédia Itaú Cultural =

Brazilian online encyclopedia

The Enciclopédia Itaú Cultural de Arte e Cultura Brasileiras (English: Itaú Cultural Encyclopedia of Brazilian Arts and Culture) is a free online encyclopedia written in Brazilian Portuguese and maintained by Itaú Cultural, an institute of Itaú Unibanco. Introduced in 2001, it contains entries pertaining to Brazilian literature, visual arts, music, technology, theatre, cinema, and dance.

== History ==
The encyclopedia originates from a 1987 database on the visual arts of Brazil, the product of a previous decade-long effort by Itaú Unibanco to document cultural events and digitize photographs and texts. In its original 2001 version, the encyclopedia comprised around 3,000 articles related to the visual arts, focusing on painting. Beginning in 2004, it expanded to encompass other art forms.

== Content ==
Curated by an internal group of specialists, the encyclopedia includes around 220,000 entries, divided into six main categories: People, Works, Groups, Institutions, Art Exhibitions, and Terms and Concepts. In November 2025, it introduced the Espaço do Educador, a didatic platform on artistic education. The encyclopedia's content is protected by copyright.
