= CAIXA Cultural São Paulo =

Museum and community center in São Paulo

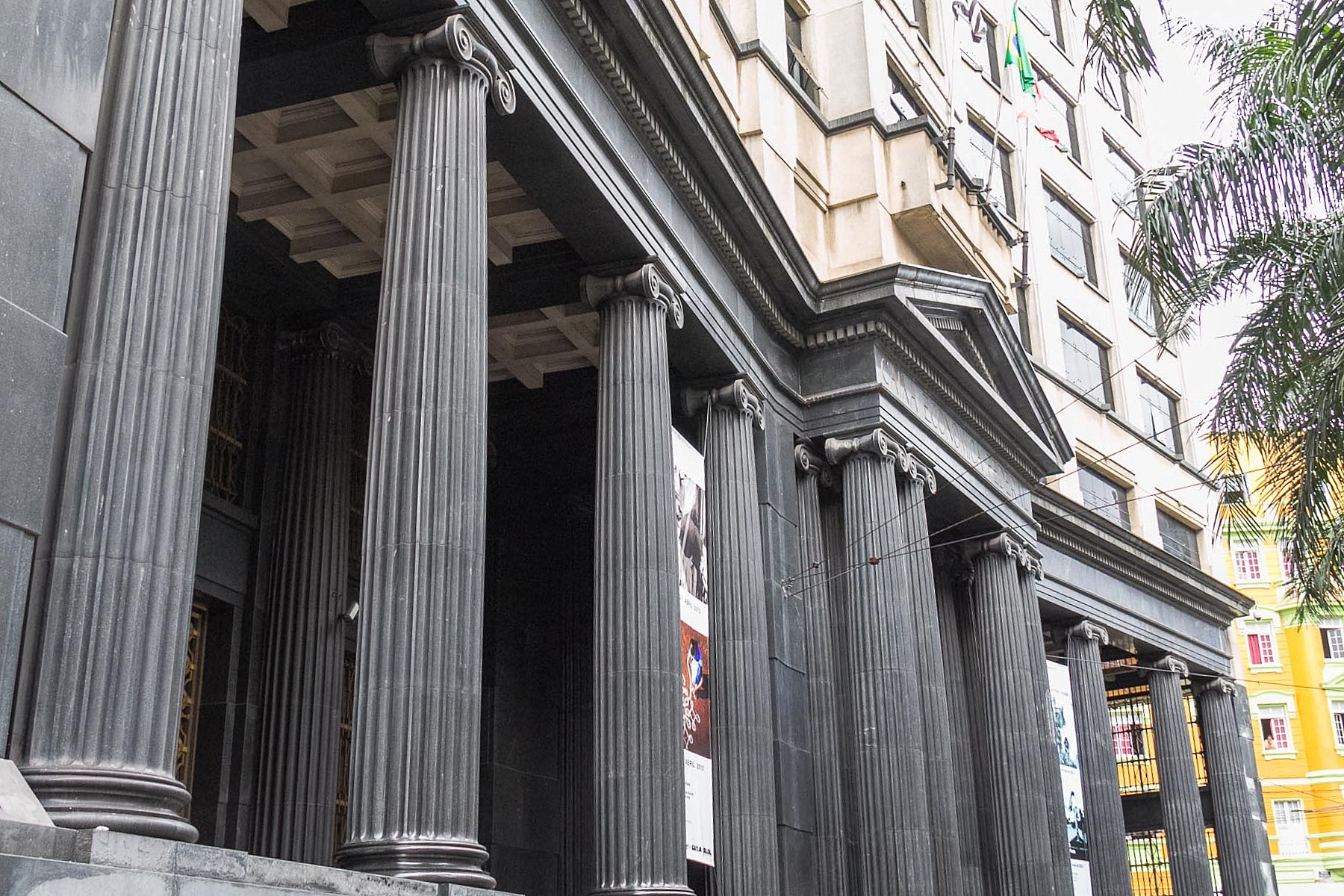
- Façade of Sé Building, built in the first half of the 20th century
- Established: 1989
- Location: São Paulo, São Paulo (state), Brazil
- Coordinates: 23°32′57″S 46°37′58″W
- Type: Cultural center and museum
- Director: Sonia Regina da Silva (Note: True in 2014, but no update available.)
- Architects: Albuquerque & Longo office
- Public transit access: Sé
- Website: caixacultural.com.br/Paginas/SaoPaulo.aspx

CAIXA Cultural São Paulo is a museum and community center in São Paulo, Brazil. It is one of CAIXA Cultural network's units, a complex of cultural centers located in different capital cities in Brazil, maintained by Caixa Econômica Federal. In operation since 1989, the São Paulo unit is located in the Sé Building, the bank's former regional headquarters, inaugurated in 1939 by Getúlio Vargas. The building is an important example of Art Deco architecture in São Paulo and is listed as a city heritage site. Caixa Cultural also runs a second center in São Paulo, the Vitrine da Paulista Gallery, on the first floor of Conjunto Nacional.

The institution houses the Caixa Museum, with various objects and documents referring to the history of Caixa Econômica Federal and Brazil's financial system, as well as internal spaces with period ambiance and preserved original elements. It also houses different exhibition spaces, a reading room, a workshop room and an auditorium. It maintains a permanent program of cultural events, including dance shows, theater plays, concerts, debates, video and cinema sessions, dramatic readings, lectures and temporary exhibitions, especially in the Visual arts' field.

== The institution ==
The CAIXA Cultural network was created in 1980, under the initial name of "Conjunto Cultural da Caixa", aiming to promote, disseminate and support events, projects and artistic/cultural manifestations in the fields of visual arts, photography, theater, dance and literature. In addition, the network also aimed to preserve Caixa Econômica Federal's collection, specialized in the institution's memory and the history of Brazil's financial system. The first unit of Conjunto Cultural da Caixa was opened to the public still in 1980, in Brasília.

The São Paulo unit is the network's second oldest, inaugurated on August 29, 1989. It was installed in the Sé Building, a historical building located in Sé Square, listed by Conpresp, built in the second half of the 1930s to be the bank's state headquarters and in disuse since the late 1970s, when the headquarters were transferred to the Torre Sul Building, on Paulista Avenue. The exhibition space was installed on the first floor, and the sixth floor was reserved for the Caixa Museum, with the institution's historical collection. The building still houses some of Caixa's administrative offices, in addition to the Sé bank branch.

In March 2002, CAIXA Cultural inaugurated a second exhibition space in the city, inside Conjunto Nacional: the Vitrine da Paulista Gallery, a hall of approximately 300 m^{2}, distributed between the first floor and the mezzanine, with external glass walls facing Paulista Avenue, intended to house exhibitions and dance/theater performances.

In the context of São Paulo's 450th anniversary celebrations, Caixa Econômica Federal (the owner of 90% of the real estate properties located in the so-called "Sé quadrilateral", area between Sé Square and Wenceslau Brás, Roberto Simonsen and Floriano Peixoto streets) financed a restoration project of nine buildings' façades in the block, as well as the renovation of the Sé Building and the restructuring and expansion of the cultural center, which now occupies the ground, first, second, and sixth floors of the building. The project was executed in partnership with São Paulo's City Hall. The cultural center was reinaugurated on January 24, 2004, with the presence of the then mayor, Marta Suplicy, and Caixa's former president, Jorge Mattoso. Three days later, the inaugural exhibition "Referencial Anita Malfatti" was opened.

Since the reinauguration, CAIXA Cultural São Paulo has expanded its list of activities, integrating itself into the city's cultural circuit, mainly through major exhibitions dedicated to personalities such as Carmen Miranda, Salvador Dalí, Marc Chagall, Joan Miró, Curt Goetz and Banksy, among others. The institution has a permanent calendar of cultural events, with dance and theater shows, concerts, debates, dramatic readings, lectures, and workshops; and provides free internet access to visitors. It also offers guided tours for schools; a course on the history of downtown São Paulo for teachers, architects and tour guides; and activities for senior citizens.

== The building ==
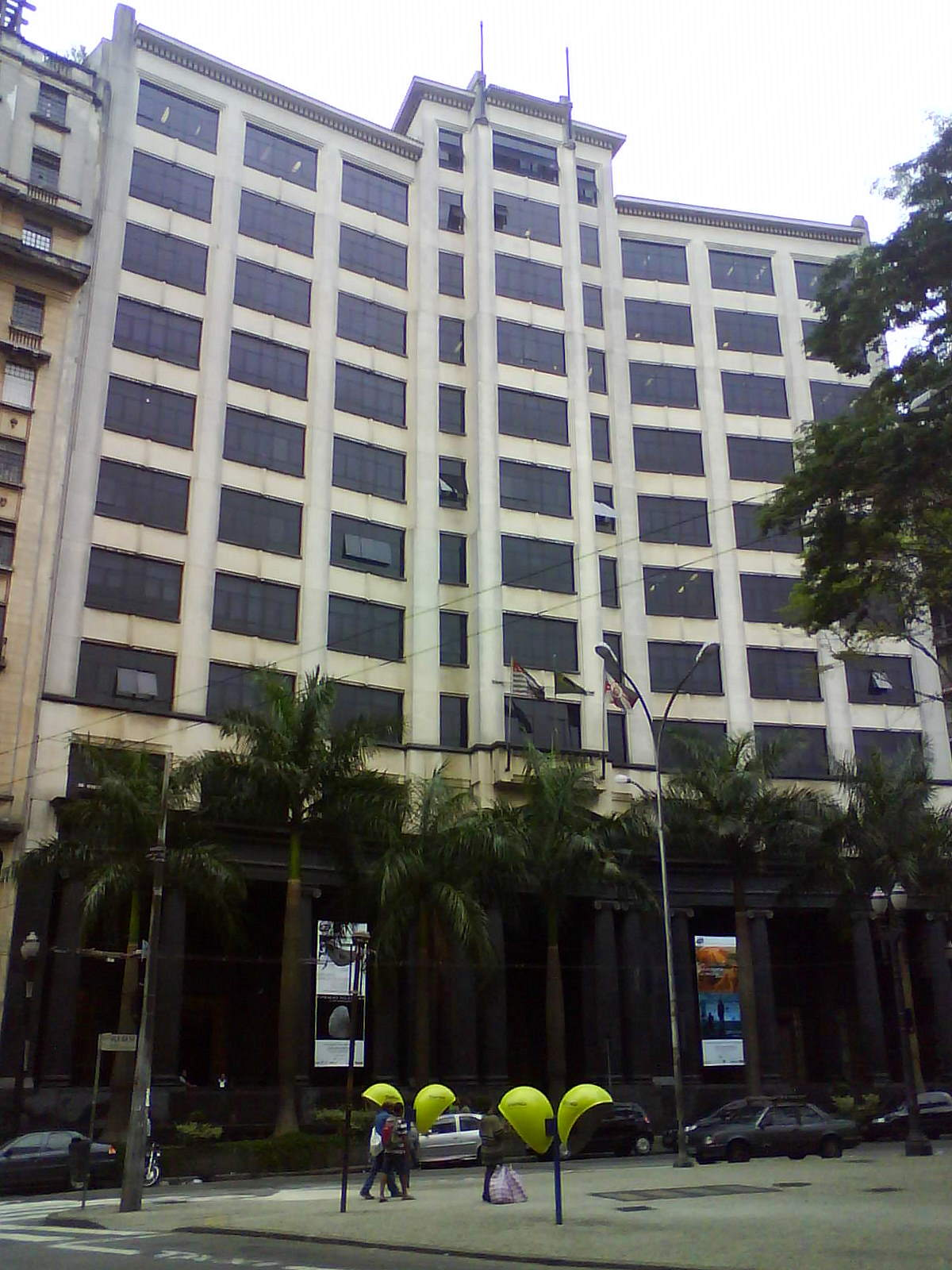
The Sé Building, headquarters of Caixa Cultural São Paulo

CAIXA Cultural São Paulo is housed in the Sé Building, in front of Sé Square, in the historic center of São Paulo. The building was designed to house the administrative offices of Caixa Econômica Federal in São Paulo after a series of financial operations carried out by the bank to acquire the properties surrounding the old 1907 headquarters, which was located in the old Travessa da Sé (now Wenceslau Brás Street). The project's elaboration began in 1933 and the construction in 1935, both under the responsibility of Albuquerque & Longo office. The inauguration took place on August 29, 1939, with the presence of then president Getúlio Vargas.

Designed in Art Deco style, with 17,000 m^{2} of built area, the building aims to express the idea of monumentality, in line with the spirit of the official architecture of the Estado Novo in the 1930s, when public buildings were idealized to reflect the country's strength and, at the same time, exalt Vargas' regime. Such monumentality is expressed, above all, by the portico and ionic columns of black piracaia granite at the main entrance, and in the marble coating on the internal walls of the first floor.

The ceiling height is very high, reaching the second overstore. The hall has an octagonal shape and is preceded by a room adorned by a stained glass window with more than six meters high, executed by the Milanese artist Henrique Zucca, portraying the riches of São Paulo: agriculture (especially coffee), industry and livestock. The vaulted ceiling has a skylight with stained glass windows. A great amount of imported material was used in the finishing: glass from England, marble from Italy and functional elements from the United States. The paneling and other carpentry services were executed by São Paulo School of Arts and Crafts. Brushed steel columns and hardwood floors complete the ornamentation. The building is listed as a municipal heritage site (Conpresp).

The Sé Building housed the headquarters of the Caixa Econômica in São Paulo until 1979, when the bank's offices were transferred to a building on Paulista Avenue. When the cultural center was installed in 1989 and reopened in 2004, the building underwent renovations and adaptations, aiming to provide the internal space with adequate technical conditions for the new activities, including air conditioning and lighting. Currently, the building houses, besides the cultural center, the Sé bank agency and some administrative areas of Caixa.

== Collection and installations ==
=== Caixa Museum ===
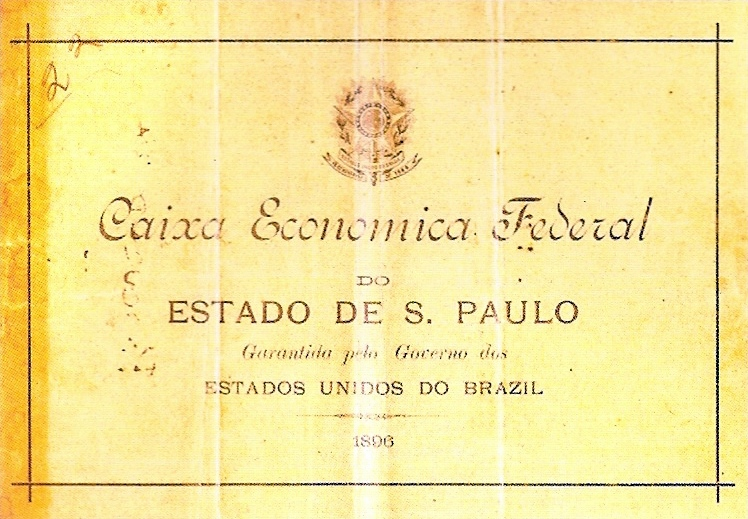
Savings passbook of the Caixa Econômica Federal, from 1896. Caixa Museum's collection

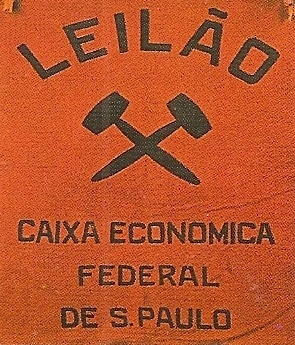
Auction banner, 1930's. Caixa Museum's collection

Caixa Museum is located on the Sé Building's sixth floor and occupies a total area of 1,200 m^{2}. Its main activity is the preservation and promotion of Caixa Econômica Federal's memory and historical assets, also approaching issues such as the history of the national financial system and São Paulo's old downtown. The collection is composed of about 5,200 items, 3,900 of which are photographs, historical records and documents, and 1,300 objects of various functions and origins. The collection was amassed through the preservation of the Sé Building's original materials and elements, the collection of objects from other areas belonging to the Caixa and the donations from third parties.

Among the museum's permanent exhibition, the following stand out: the Presidency Room, preserving the original furniture and organization; the Board Room, where you can find documents such as the first time book, the first savings passbook and the first minute, all from 1875 (the year Caixa started its activities in São Paulo); the presidents' Gallery, with oil-painted portraits of Caixa's presidents in São Paulo, between 1875 and 1970; the Medical Service Room, with several surgical instruments and equipment used in the first decades of the 20th century; The Memorial Room, with historical information, objects, several machines and photographic panels telling the history of Caixa Econômica, besides a scale model of the Sé Building; and the Housing Room, concerning the history of funding for house acquisition.

The museum also holds collections of banknotes, coins, office machines, educational exhibits on savings, money and other aspects of the popular economy evolution and an exhibit on the history of lotteries in Brazil, from the colonial period to the present day. In the photographs' collection, a set of Hélio Becherini's works depicting the Sé Building and scenes from downtown São Paulo stand out.

=== Galleries and installations ===
In addition to the permanent exhibition galleries occupied by the museum, CAIXA Cultural São Paulo has a series of halls designed to house temporary exhibits, as well as areas reserved for educational and cultural activities, technical reserve, workshops and ateliers:

- Great Hall: the largest exhibition space in the complex is located on the first floor and has an area of 190 m^{2}. It has a ceiling height of more than thirteen meters, Carrara marble columns, and natural lighting through a skylight. It is decorated with a large stained glass window executed by Henrique Zucca, depicting the workers and the riches of São Paulo.
- Florisbela de Araújo Rodrigues Gallery: semi-open space of 81 m^{2}, located at the entrance of the Sé Building, dedicated to small exhibitions. The name is a tribute to the first client to open a savings account in São Paulo, in 1875.
- Dom Pedro II Gallery: also located on the first floor, it has 142 m^{2} of area and a ceiling height of 4.9 m. The name is a tribute to the second emperor of Brazil, who was also the founder of Caixa Econômica Federal.
- Neuter Michelon Gallery: large hall located on the second floor, 146 m^{2} of area. The space honors the first manager assigned to Caixa's cultural area in São Paulo.
- Humberto Betetto Gallery: named after a former employee of the bank, it is located on the second floor. It is the second largest gallery in the complex, with an area of 180 m^{2}.
- Auditorium: dedicated to house lectures and courses promoted by CAIXA Cultural. Located on the sixth floor, it has an area of 74 m^{2} and capacity for 50 people.
- Workshop Room: space destined to didactic activities. It has 149 m^{2} of area and capacity for 40 people.

== See also ==
- Bank of Brazil Cultural Center
- Itaú Cultural Institute
- Centro Cultural da Penha
- São Paulo Museum of Art
- Ema Gordon Klabin Cultural Foundation
- São Paulo Cultural Center

== Bibliography ==
- Multiple authors (2005). Bravo! Guia de Cultura (in Portuguese). Editora Abril.
- Lourenço, Maria Cecília França (2000). Guia de museus brasileiros (in Portuguese). São Paulo, SP, Brasil: Universidade de São Paulo. Comissão de Patrimônio Cultural. ISBN 85-314-0572-6. OCLC 47727106.
- Mendonça, Rodrigo Melgaço Furtado de (2013). Cidadania cultural: apontamentos para um centro de cultura (Thesis). USP.
