= Direita Street =

Street in the city of São Paulo

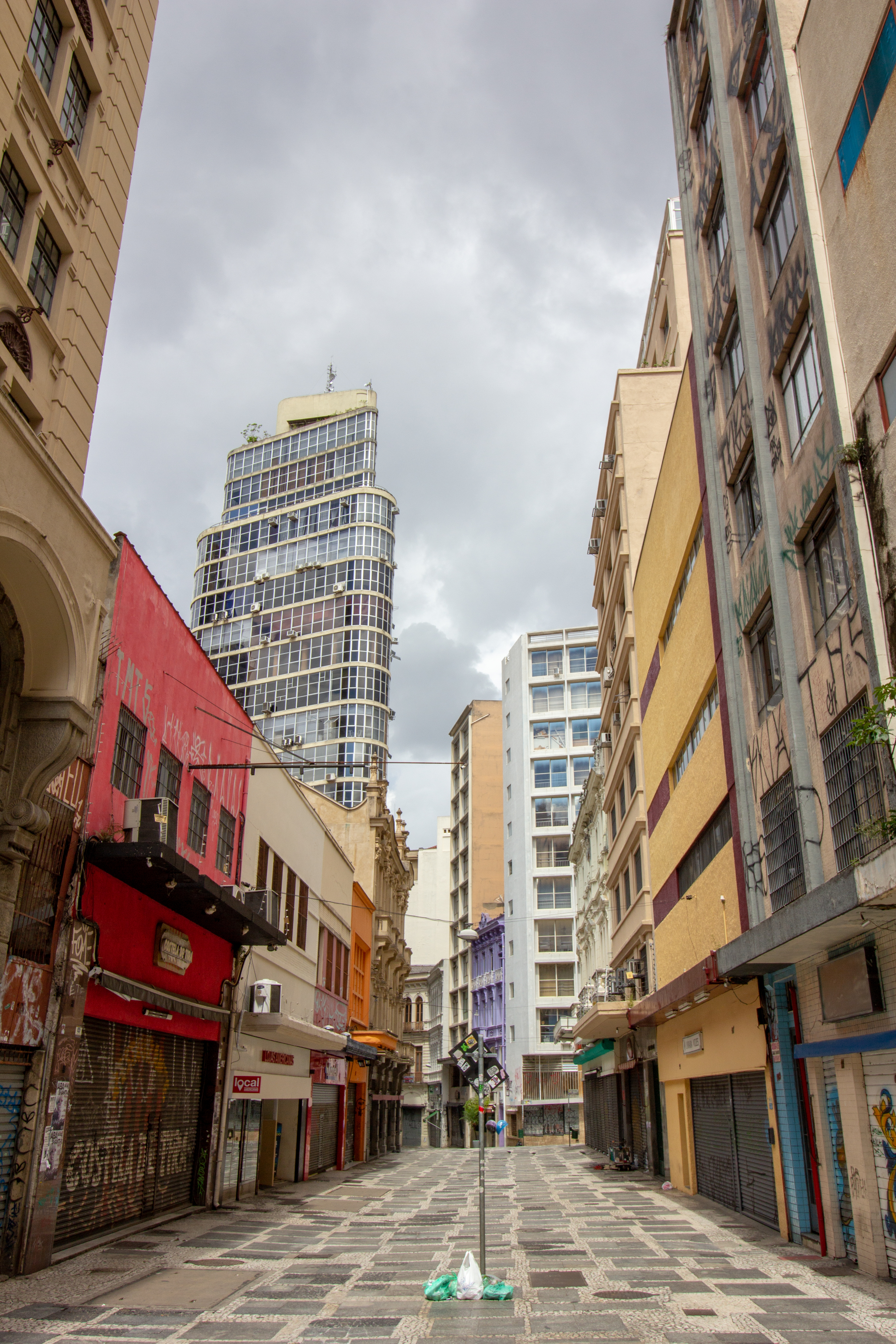
- Direita Street in 2019
- Interactive map of Direita Street
- Former names: Rua Direita de Santo Antônio, Rua Direita da Misericórdia
- Length: 300 m (980 ft)
- Location: Sé, São Paulo, São Paulo, Brazil
- From: Praça da Sé
- To: Patriarca Square

Construction
- Commissioned: 16th century

Other
- Known for: One of the oldest streets in São Paulo

Direita Street is one of the oldest streets in the city of São Paulo, located in the Sé region. It begins at Praça da Sé and ends at Patriarca Square. Together with 15 de Novembro Street and São Bento Street, it forms the historic "triangle" of the city center. It corners José Bonifácio Street, Largo da Misericórdia and Quintino Bocaiuva Street.

== History ==
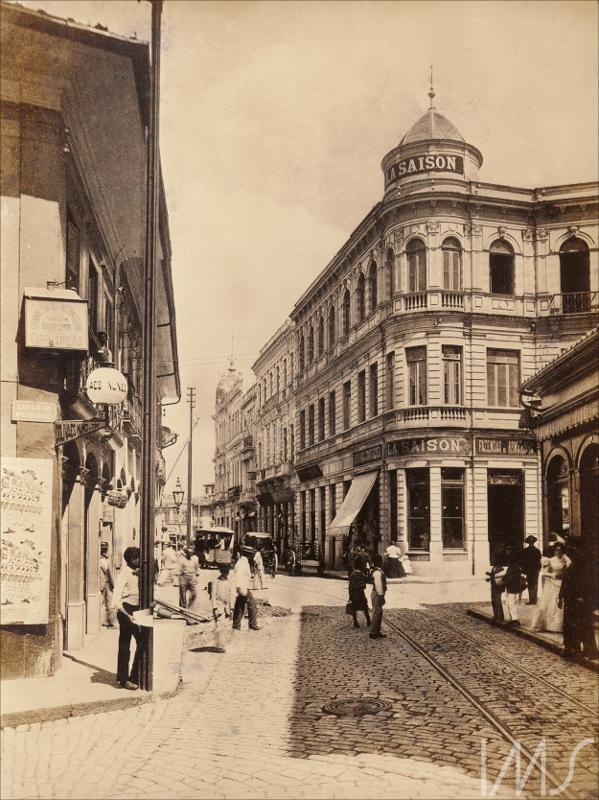
Direita Street around 1900

Direita Street was opened at the end of the 16th century to connect the city center of São Paulo with the old road that led to the indigenous village of Pinheiros, now an Upper class district of the city.

It was laid out without any planning, by force of necessity. From the Pátio do Colégio, the cradle of São Paulo, following the Igreja da Misericórdia, and after the Igreja de Santo Antônio, you would rush to the Vale do Anhangabaú, climb what would later become the Ladeira do Piques (Rua Quirino de Andrade), and then the Pinheiros road, now Consolação Street (formerly Estrada de Sorocaba). From there you entered the sertão.

Naming the main street of a town Rua Direita is a custom that came from Portugal with the country's colonizers. It didn't matter whether the street was straight or not, as the main street of the town it had to be called Direita, and it was usually to the right of the main local church, due to the religious influence on people's lives. The street was initially called "Direita de Santo Antônio" and also "Direita da Misericórdia", the religious temples being the references.

Between 1700 and the early 1800s, most of the houses were semi-detached, with shops on the first floor and residences on the upper floor. In 1828, the street was illuminated with lamps burning olive oil or fish oil. It wasn't until 1870, with the city's improvements, that it had gas lighting, donkey-drawn streetcars, running water and cobblestone sidewalks. Electric lighting arrived in 1890.

Together with São Bento Street and 15 de Novembro Street, it formed the famous "Paulistano Triangle", representing the center of commercial, intellectual and elegant life in the city of São Paulo in the late 19th and early 20th centuries. The street had illustrious residents such as the Baron of Iguape (Antônio da Silva Prado), the Baron of Tietê (José Manuel da Silva), and Senator Nicolau Pereira de Campos Vergueiro. From 1970 onwards, Direita Street and other streets in the old center became strictly pedestrianized.

== Retail ==
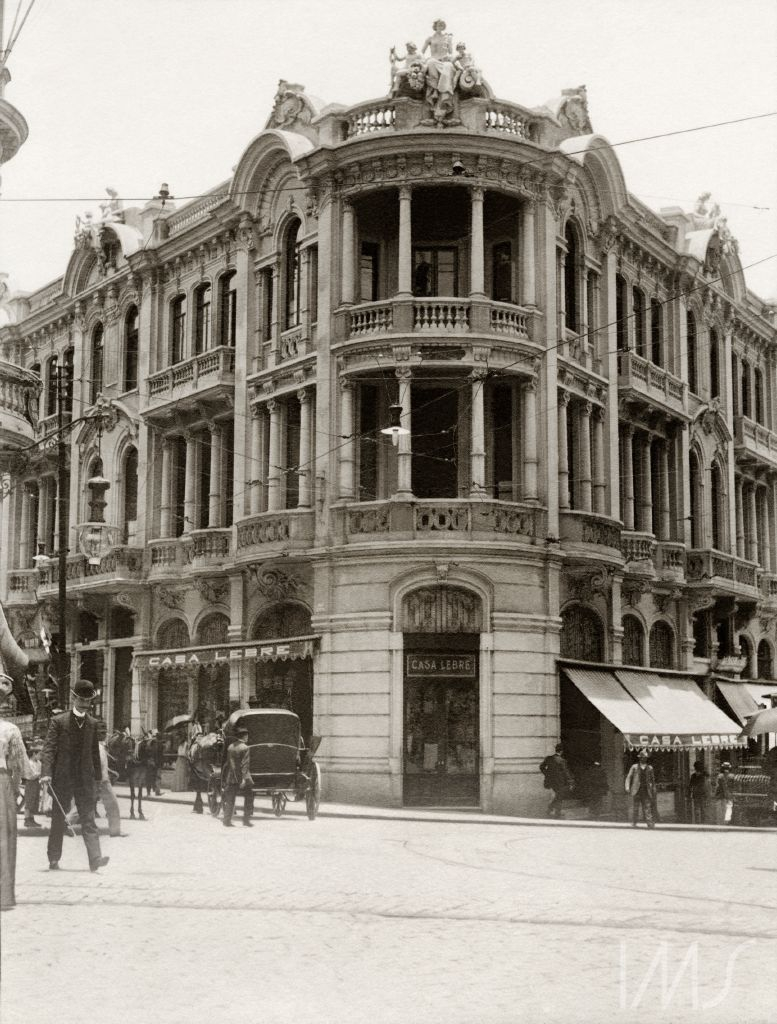
Casa Lebre around 1912

Since the middle of the 19th century, the series of stores on Direita Street was started by Casa Lebre, which operated in the mansion owned by the Baron of Tietê on the corner with 15 de Novembro Street, a store that survived for decades.

At the beginning of the 20th century, much more sophisticated stores began to appear, with showcases and more elaborate service. This is how Casa Alemã (later Galeria Paulista de Modas) came to be, which built a modern headquarters on Direita Street and survived the decades. Casa Au Bon Marché, almost on the corner of what is now Patriarca Square, and then, almost opposite, Casa Bonilha. The street was also chosen by Casa Bevilacqua, one of the first musical instrument manufacturers in Brazil.

According to an 1828 edition of the O Farol Paulistano newspaper, chairs and canapés from England were advertised, which could be found at Direita Street, 2 or at the home of Mr. Joaquim Elias.

The street still houses important stores such as Ao Preço Fixo, Tecelagem Francesa, Casa Henrique, Casa Kosmos, Casa Sloper, Lojas Brasileiras, Lojas Americanas, Marcel Modas, and many others that have long maintained their commercial tradition.

== Historic buildings ==
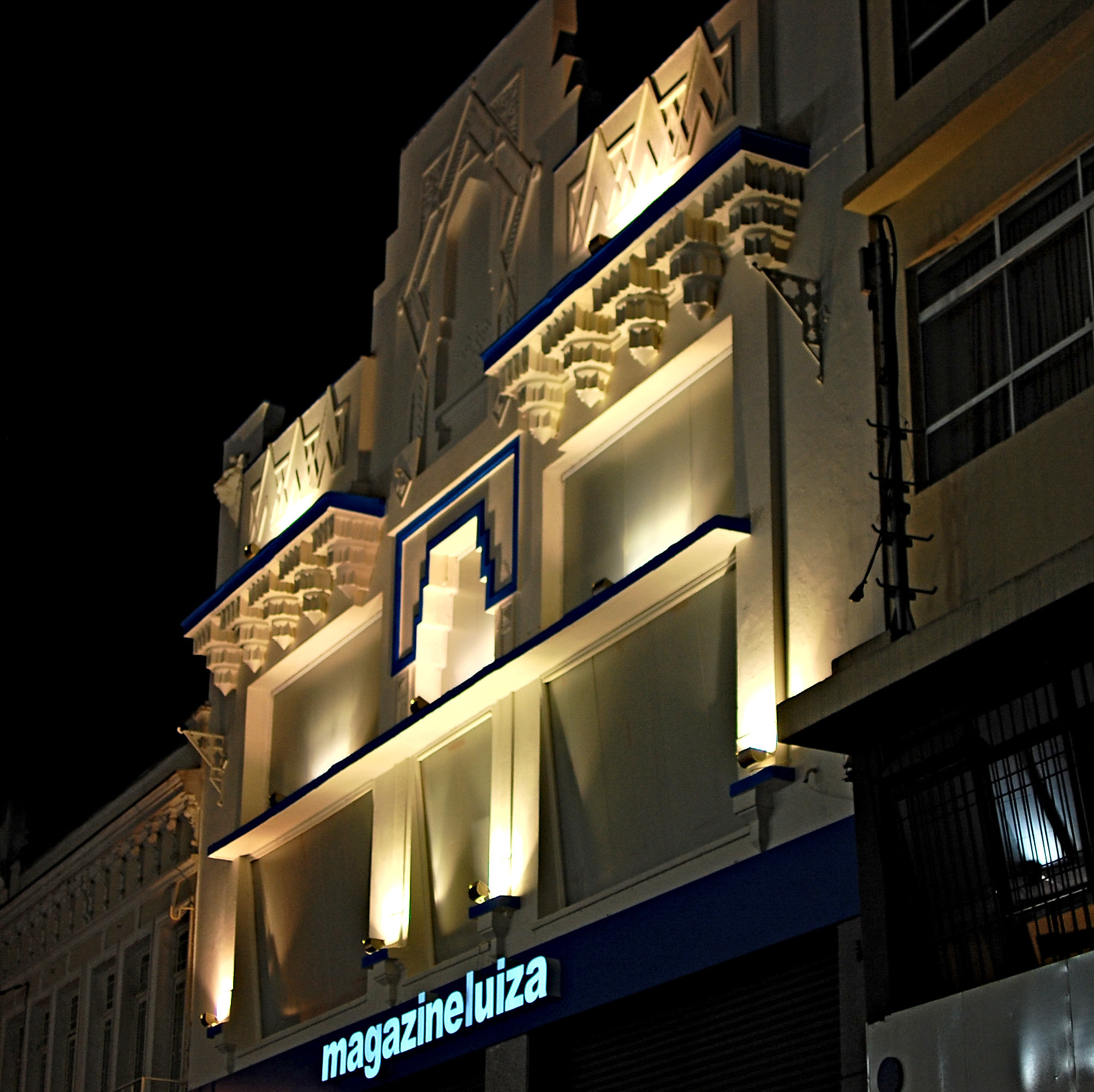
Facade of the old Cine Alhambra

The first first telephone exchange in the city of São Paulo (one of the first in Brazil) was inaugurated on 7 January 1884 by the Companhia Telégrafos Urbanos (Ferdinand Rodde & Co.) in the old building at 33 Direita Street, and is part of the country's telecommunications history.

The Guinle Building is considered to be São Paulo's first skyscraper, with 7 floors, and was the forerunner of verticalization in the city. Built between 1913 and 1916, it was designed by the architect Hipólito Pujol Junior and only had its construction approved by the City Hall after an official report, because the then mayor Baron of Duprat (Raimundo da Silva Duprat) doubted that a building of this size would be stable. The engineer Antônio Francisco de Paula Sousa, then director of the Polytechnic School of the University of São Paulo (Poli–USP), was asked for approval to continue the work. The building has figures reminiscent of coffee leaves and fruit, a reminder of the wealth of the 'green gold' that made its construction possible at the beginning of the 20th century.

The luxurious Cine Alhambra was built in 1927 and belonged to João Batista de Souza and Manuel Pereira Guimarães. It was inaugurated in 1928 with the screening of the Metro-Goldwyn-Mayer (MGM) film Flesh and the Devil from Clarence Brown, which was considered "inappropriate for ladies" at the time.
