= São Paulo Jockey Club =

Club in São Paulo, Brazil

- Jockey Club de São Paulo
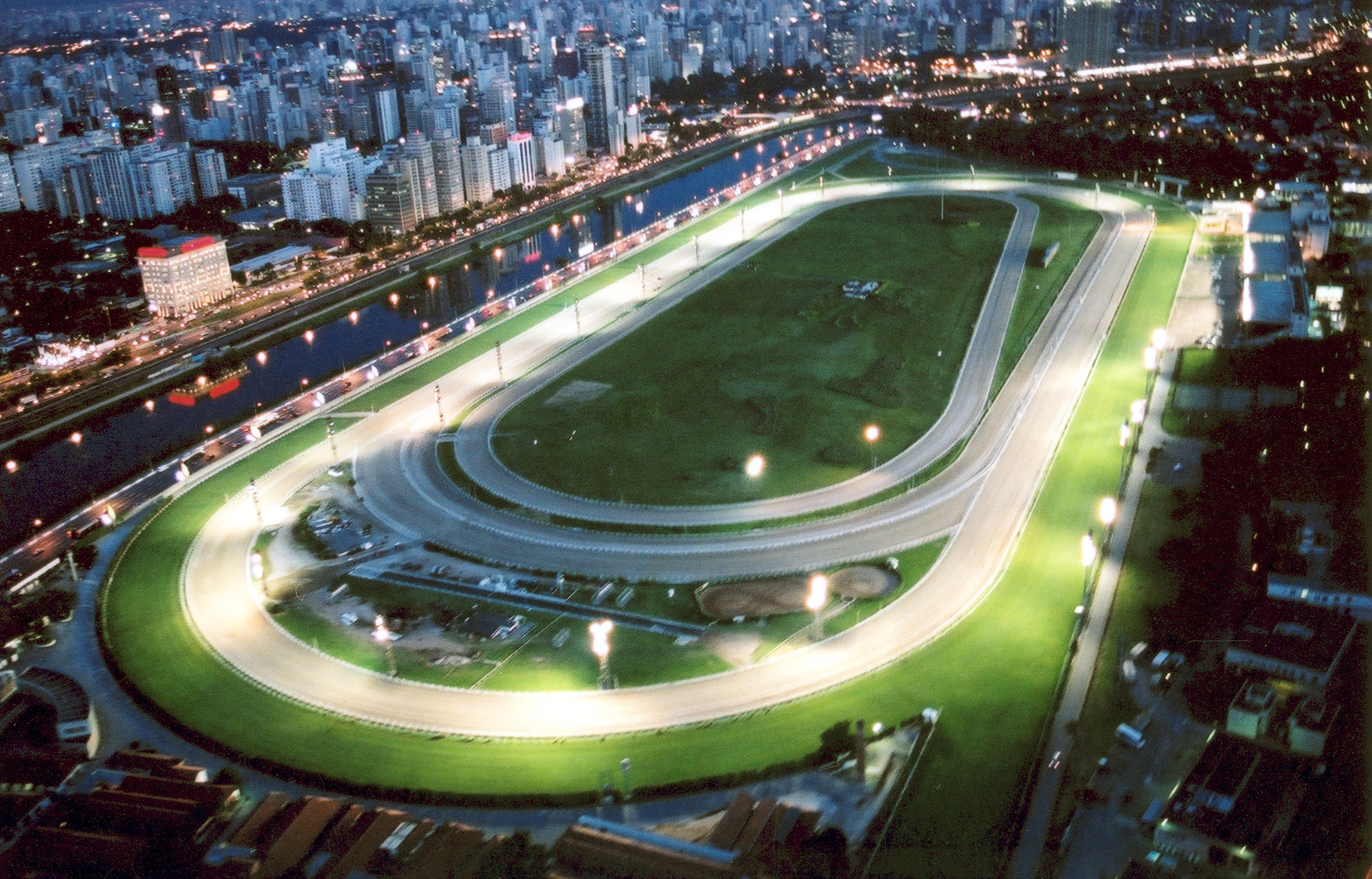
- Interactive map of the São Paulo Jockey Club area

General information
- Location: São Paulo, São Paulo; Brazil
- Coordinates: 23°34′58.49″S 46°41′56.88″W
- Opened: January 25, 1941; 85 years ago

Technical details
- Floor area: 600000 m^{2}

The São Paulo Jockey Club is an entity founded on March 14, 1875, under the name of Club de Corridas Paulistano that manages and owns the Cidade Jardim Racecourse. On January 25, 1941, the current track was inaugurated in Cidade Jardim, in the Morumbi district of São Paulo, in order to correspond to modern times, serving as a stage for different events such as fairs, fashion shows, some parties, among others.

The land on which the current São Paulo Jockey Club stands was donated by the Cidade Jardim Company, which saw the need for a larger space to meet the demands of the public. The racecourse was built between 1937 and 1941 on the banks of the Pinheiros River, which was not yet straightened at the time. The project was designed by Elisário Bahiana and later remodeled by French architect Henri Sajous.

Despite the location of the new racecourse, the club's headquarters still remained near its original venue in Rosário Street. From there, it moved to São Bento Street in 1917, then to 15 de Novembro Street, Antônio Prado Square and finally, in the 1960s, to its current location on Boa Vista Street, in the Central Zone. The Jockey Club also has the Campinas Training Center, where the Boa Vista Racecourse was located.

== History ==
=== Origins ===
Although the current headquarters of the São Paulo Jockey Club were only inaugurated in 1941, the association's history goes back more than 100 years. In March 1875, the then Club de Corridas Paulistano was inaugurated with Antônio da Silva Prado, who was 23 years old at the time, as one of its most important founders. The board of directors was also composed of President Rafael Aguiar Pais de Barros, who had a law degree and was recognized as the patriarch of horse racing. After a trip to England, where he got to know the sport, he began to search ways of creating a racing club in the city of São Paulo, which at the time had 25,000 inhabitants. The space in the Mooca floodplain was rented for 20 contos de réis.

The Jockey Club of São Paulo formed São Paulo's business elite. In the beginning, the 73 members together had a capital of 9 contos and 90 thousand réis. Rafael Aguiar Pais de Barros, together with his associates, drafted the racing regulations and plotted the tracks on the hills of Mooca. On a Sunday, October 29, 1876, the first race took place. At the inauguration, two horses competed for a prize of 1,000 contos de réis from the provincial government. Their names were Macaco, who was still a mystery, and Republicano, who already had more wins to his name. However, Macaco was the first horse to win a race at the club, running 1,609 meters in 2 minutes and 3 seconds, 2 seconds faster than his opponent, going against the expectations of those watching.

Domitila de Castro, who won with a time of 2 minutes and 9 seconds in the third race on July 10, 1877, was the first woman to practice horse racing in São Paulo. Subsequently, more races were organized, with an average of three to five events every year until 1886. In 1881, the association was officially renamed the Jockey Club, which until then was considered the informal name. In 1888, a crisis arising from the abolition of slavery hit the Jockey; the following year, president Rafael Aguiar died and a new phase of administration began.

The reopening of the Jockey under the presidency of José de Souza Queirós was encouraging, but it experienced ups and downs for a few years. In 1893, the venue registered up to 41 races, but was still faced with other difficulties. On April 28, 1912, the Mooca Racecourse was used as a flying track, with Commander Edu Chaves piloting an aeroplane towards Rio de Janeiro; it was the first connection between the two cities by air. In 1920, the space was improved and expanded to accommodate 2,800 more spectators. During the São Paulo Revolt of 1924, the Revolution of 1930 and the Constitutionalist Revolution of 1932, racing had to be suspended, which consequently resulted in bad times for the Jockey.

=== New headquarters ===
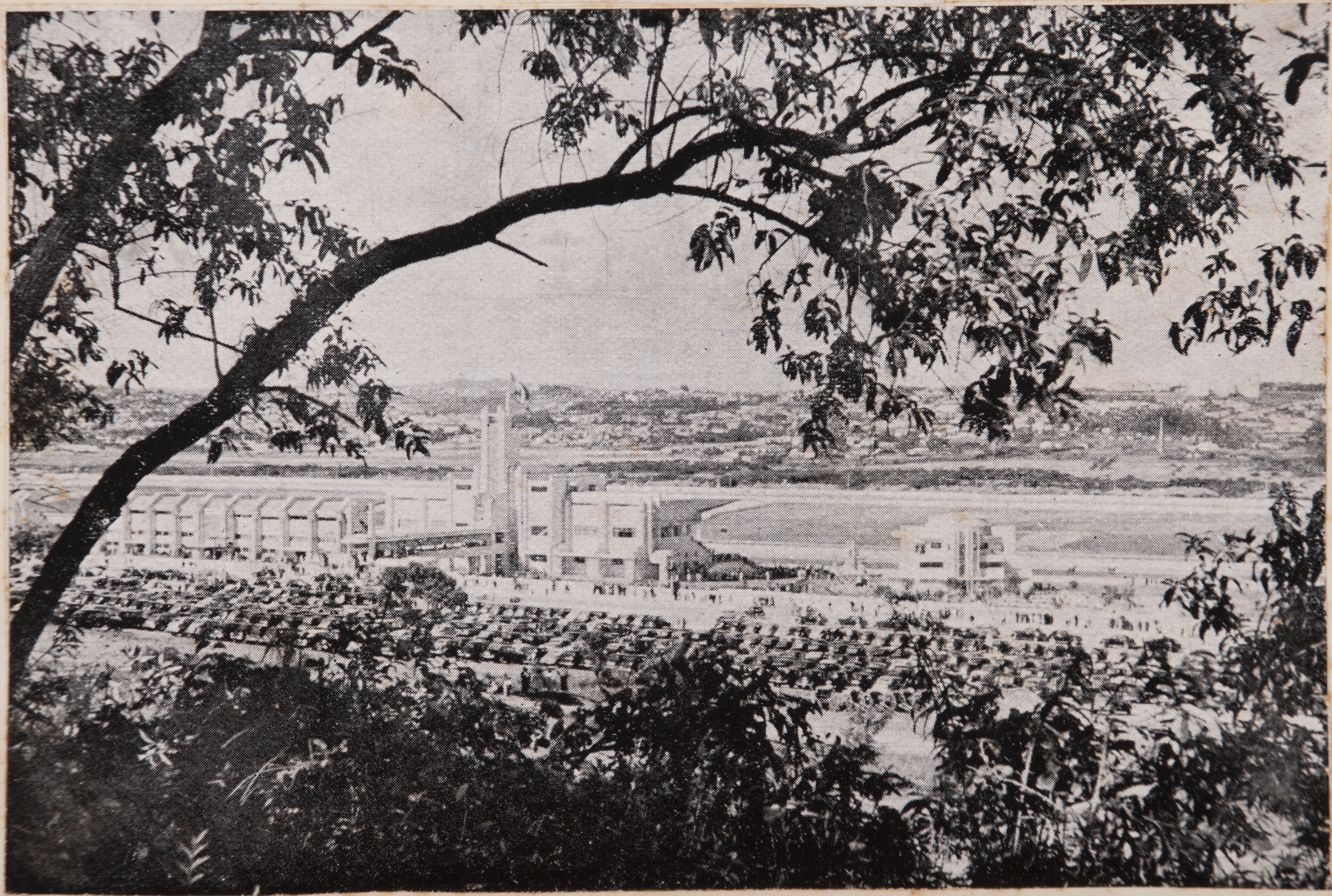
Photograph of the Jockey Club in the collection of USP's Paulista Museum.

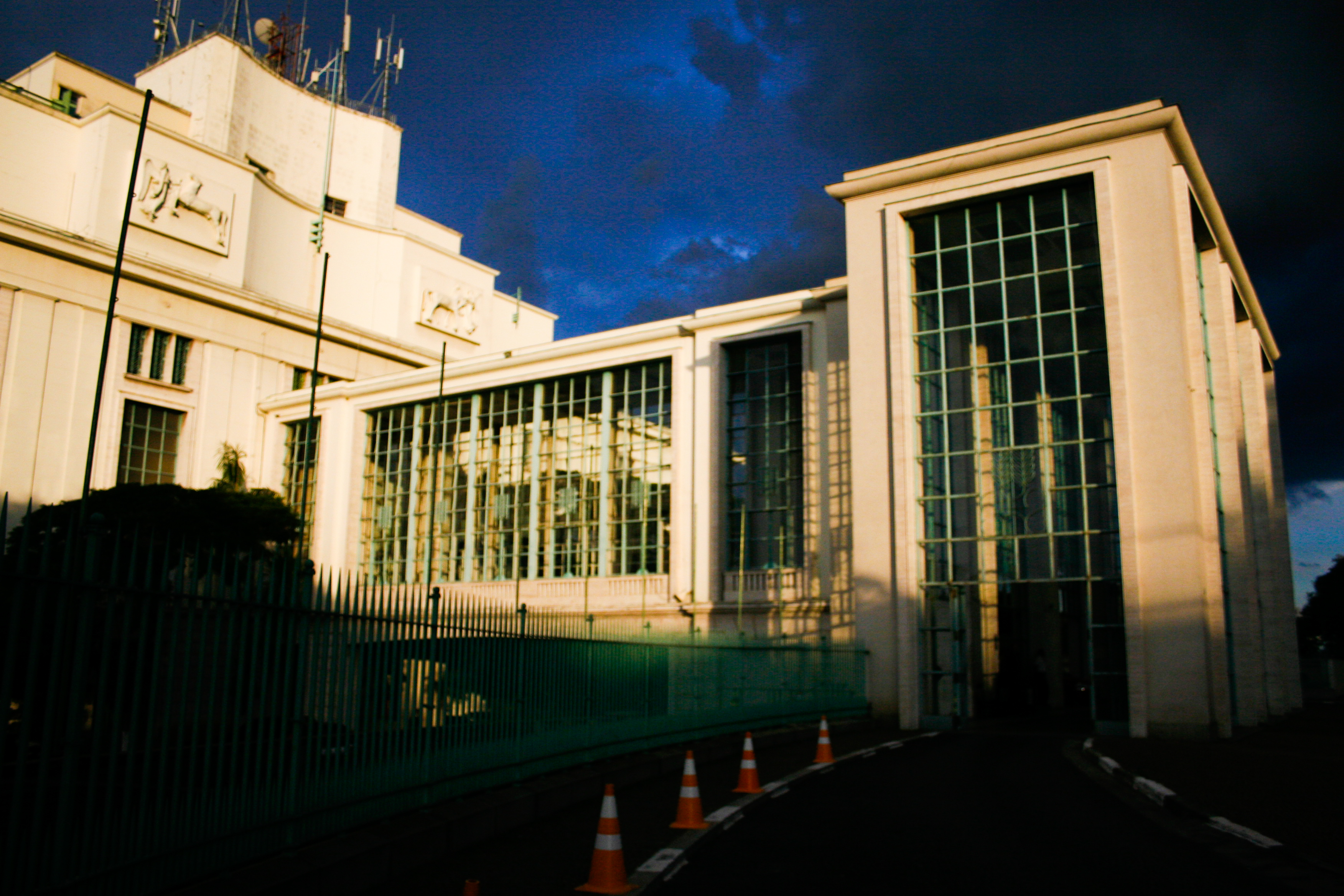
Facade of the Jockey Club at dusk.

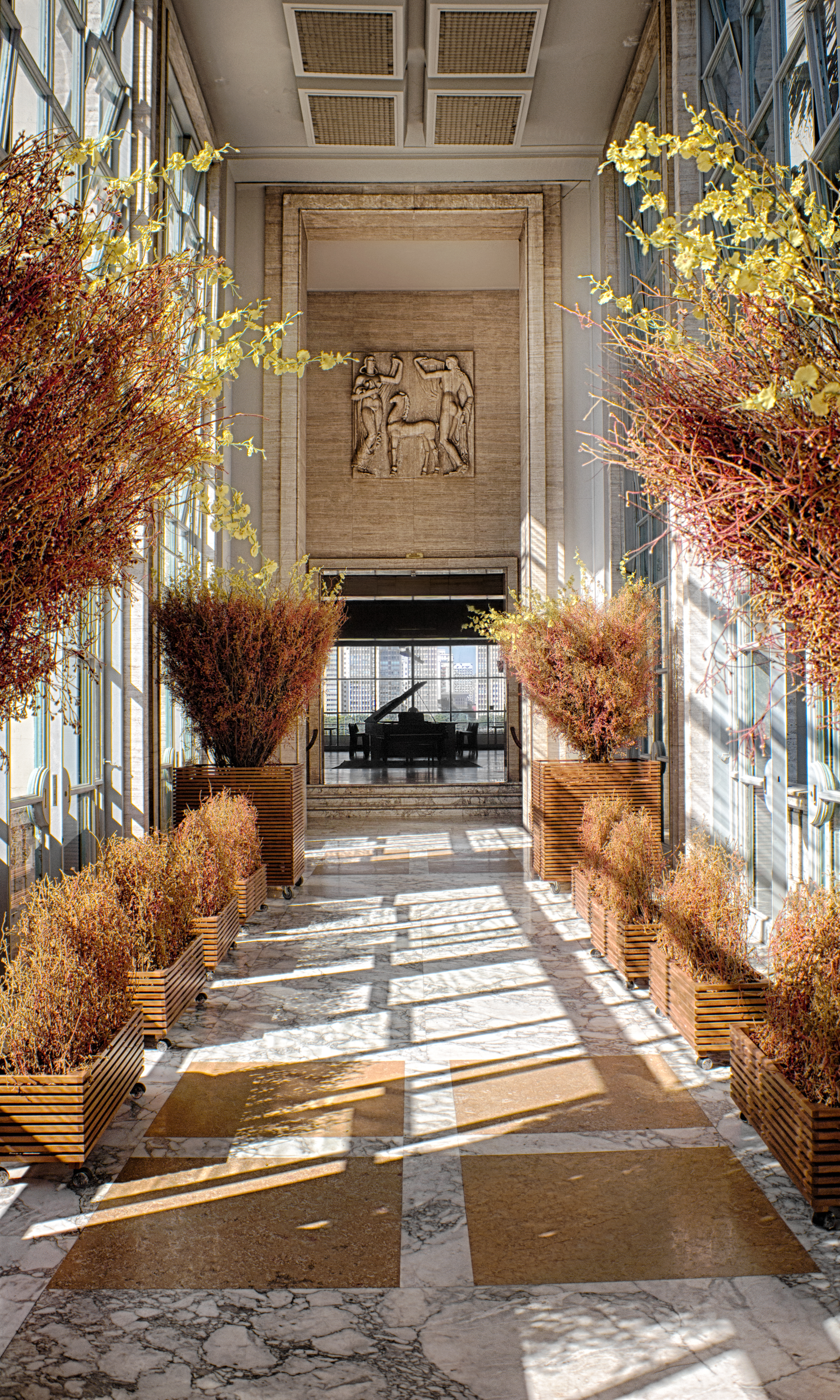
Entrance to the current headquarters of the São Paulo Jockey Club.

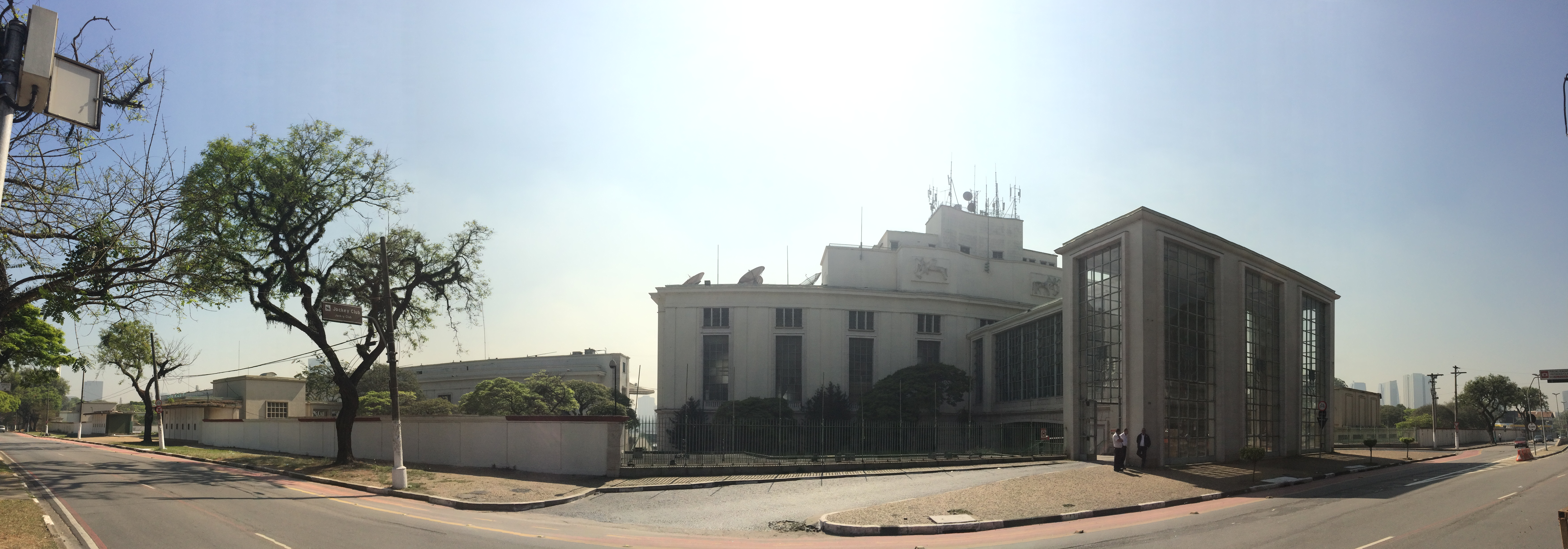
Panorama of the facade of the Jockey Club, on Lineu de Paula Machado Avenue.

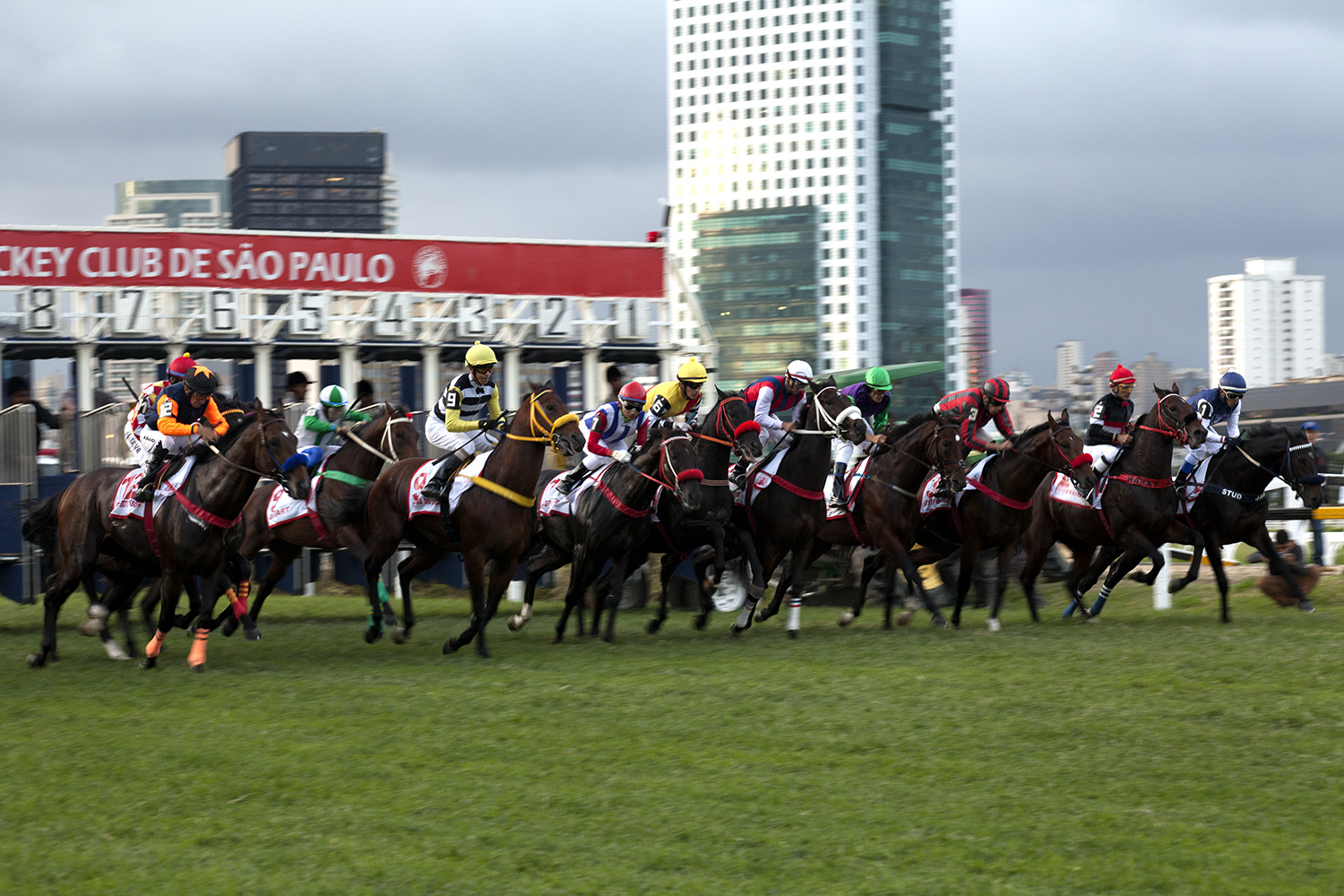
São Paulo Horse Racing Grand Prix 2017.

Between 1934 and 1941, under the management of Luiz Nazareno de Assumpção, important changes marked another era for the Jockey. On January 25, 1941, on the anniversary of the city of São Paulo, the headquarters were moved to the Cidade Jardim Racecourse, the association's current address, and the Mooca Racecourse was donated to the municipality. The transition brought more modernity and ambition to the club's history, which meant improvements in its social and sporting life.

The donation of the land by Companhia Cidade Jardim for the construction of the new racetrack defined the future of the Jockey Club. Until then, the current location of Ibirapuera Park was considered for the relocation. The vicinity of the Pinheiros River was a poorly explored and frequented area, providing a reason to expand the still-developing city.

Throughout its history, the association has fulfilled political, social and cultural functions. Currently, the Jockey has approximately 1,400 English thoroughbred horses, which compete in races on Saturdays, Sundays and Mondays on 2,119-meter grass tracks or 1,993-meter sand tracks. The main event of the year is the São Paulo Grand Prix, which is run on a 2,400-meter grass track.

=== Current situation ===
The current administration of the Jockey Club intends to renovate the racecourse, aiming for an extensive upgrade of the facilities, as well as introducing a new management model, with the purpose of recovering the club's facilities, attracting new members and resolving a significant accumulation of debts over the years. In 2016, the debt with the city government was already 220 million reais. In the same year, the club put more than a hundred pieces up for auction in order to pay off part of its debt.

On March 14, 2017, elections were held for the new management of the entity. The dispute was between the currently ruling slate, called "Jockey Club" (of vice-president Ricardo Vidigal) and the "Jockey of the Future" slate (of the opposition, Benjamin Steinbruch). After six years of trying, Benjamin Steinbruch's won and managed the venue for three years.

As a solution to the Jockey Club's financial crisis, the then mayor of São Paulo, João Doria, proposed that the venue become a public park, an idea that was apparently well accepted by both the then new administration and the previous one. The horse racing area would remain; Doria's initial idea, however, was to turn the Jockey Club into a cultural center.

Doria's project includes the restoration of the building and the construction of one or two towers using part of the site where the stables are located, without any architectural or visual damage. The Biodiversity Museum would be built there. As a result, the Jockey will pay off its debt and the people of São Paulo will get a new park with free admission.

== Internal structure ==
=== Restaurants ===
Created in 2016 after the departure of Chef Pascal Valero, Villa Jockey is a restaurant and event space designed to host weddings, birthdays, corporate events and celebrations. The venue has two lounges, two English bars, balconies and galleries, and can accommodate up to 780 people seated or 1280 for a cocktail reception. The parking lot has capacity for 2,000 vehicles.

Opened on September 7, 2016, Iulia is a restaurant and event space offering contemporary cuisine run by brothers Rodrigo and Ricardo Lima. The space, located in the Jockey Club, is also open to large events. The restaurant is named after the owners' sister Julia Lima; Iulia is Julia in Latin.

=== Jockey Farm ===
The Jockey Farm is a space inside the São Paulo Jockey Club reserved for events such as concerts, shows and festivals. International and national attractions perform there, which has a capacity for 35,000 people spread over 19,400 square meters.

== Architecture ==
Elisário Bahiana's architectural proposal consisted of promoting the efficient use of the new concrete technology, together with the application of formal elements from the Art Deco style. His project included a set of grandstands, a track, an equestrian village, buildings for the engineer's house and a facility for veterinary activities. The style chosen by the architect had futuristic characteristics for the time of construction, with sphere-shaped pillars, geometric designs and sculpted ornaments in the form of horses' heads.

In the 1950s, architect Henri Sajous was responsible for remodeling the Jockey Club's main buildings, especially the grandstand for members. His objective was to expand the facilities, with new projects for the hospital, the administrator's house, the garage, the administration building, new stables and an extension to the clubhouse. The work was carried out between 1946 and 1958 and included a total of 32 more buildings. As decoration, 15 Roman travertine sculptures by the Brazilian Victor Brecheret were installed on the premises.

=== Historical heritage ===
The São Paulo Jockey Club is a heritage site listed by the State Secretariat for Culture due to its historical and cultural importance for São Paulo, from its creation to the present day. The resolution dates from November 19, 2010.

The architectural complex is an essential part of the city's landscape, representing an educational practice in the formation of São Paulo's elite, both in the sporting and social spheres. The Jockey Club was important in the urbanization and occupation of São Paulo due to its symbolic dimension, monumentality, refinement and sophistication, reflecting the expression of a relevant mentality and cultural practice in the history of society.

Even though it is a private and restricted property, the Jockey offers leisure opportunities for the population, with a variety of facilities and activities. Its first influence on the Brazilian political history occurred shortly after its inauguration, during the leadership of Raphael Aguiar Paes de Barros, who was one of the main representatives in favor of the abolition of slavery. The Jockey Club also played an active role in the Proclamation of the Republic and in the 1930 and 1932 Revolutions, taking a strong stance in favor of Brazil's entry into the World War II with the Allies forces, receiving visits from presidential candidate Juscelino Kubitschek in 1954 and re-election candidate Luiz Inácio Lula da Silva in 2006.

== Helicopter accident ==
On February 10, 2010, a RecordTV helicopter suffered a system failure and crashed at the Jockey Club. The pilot died on the spot and the cameraman was taken to hospital with serious injuries. TV Globo's helicopter recorded the moment the Eurocopter AS350 Écureuil fell. The accident happened at around half past seven in the morning.

== Events ==
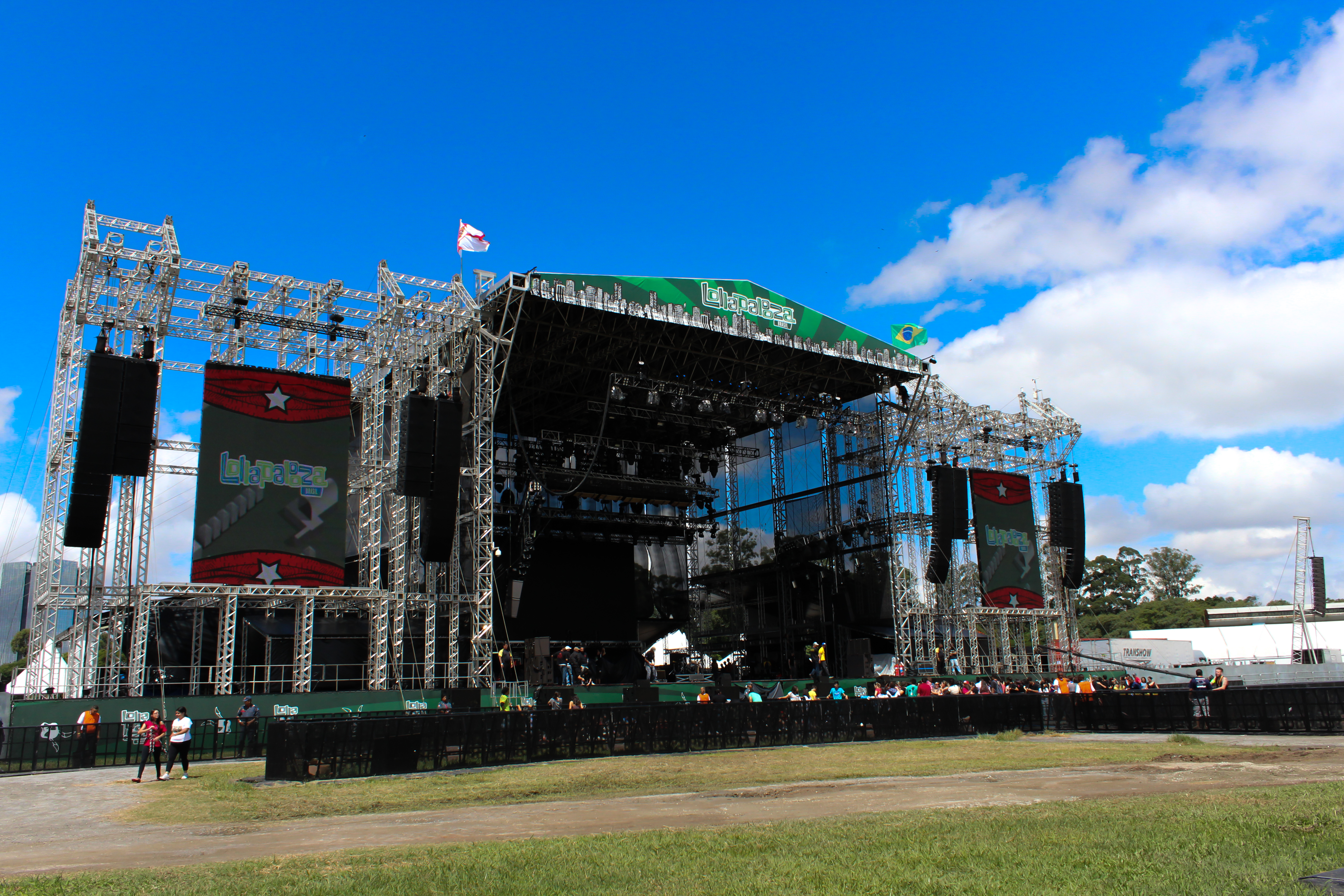
Stage for the 2013 edition of Lollapalooza Brasil, one of the main entertainment events hosted by the Jockey Club.

=== Running and walking ===
- Disney Princess Magical Run (2017);
- WRun (2017);
- 18th São Paulo International Half Marathon (2017);

=== Festivals ===
- Free Jazz Festival (1998–2001);
- Vivo Open Air (2004–2005, 2012 and 2015);
- TIM Festival (2004);
- Telefônica Sonidos Festival (2010–2011);
- F1 Rocks (2010) - Organized by Formula 1 and LG;
- Lollapalooza Brasil (2012–2013);
- Planeta Terra Festival (2012);
- Brahma Valley Festival (2015);
- Electric Zoo (2017);
- Dekmantel Festival (2017);
- Shell Open Air (2017–2019);
- São Paulo Oktoberfest (2019);

=== Concerts ===
- Andrea Bocelli (2012);
- Elton John (2013);
- Gorillaz (2018).

== Gallery ==
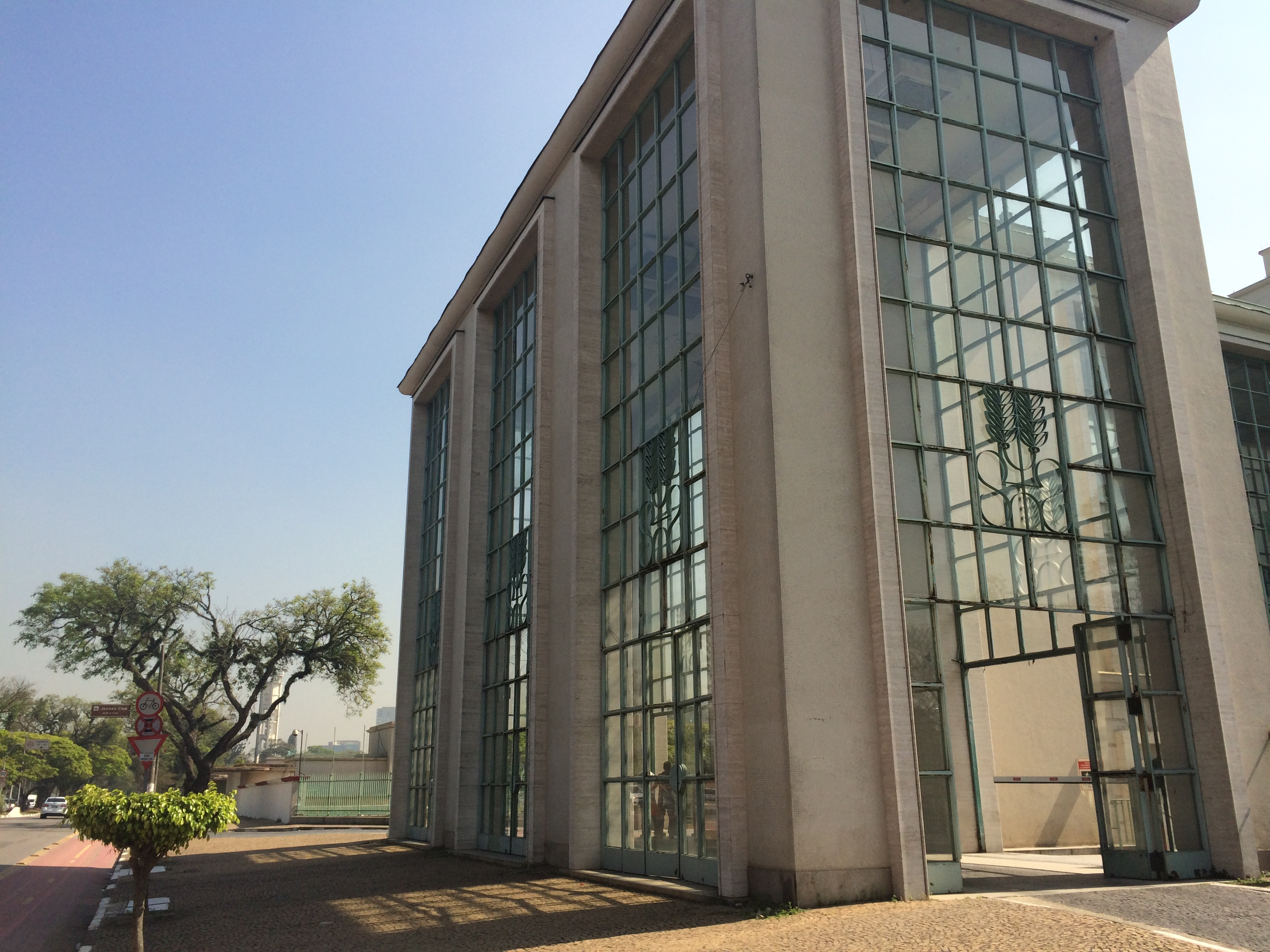
Gate on Lineu de Paula Machado Avenue.

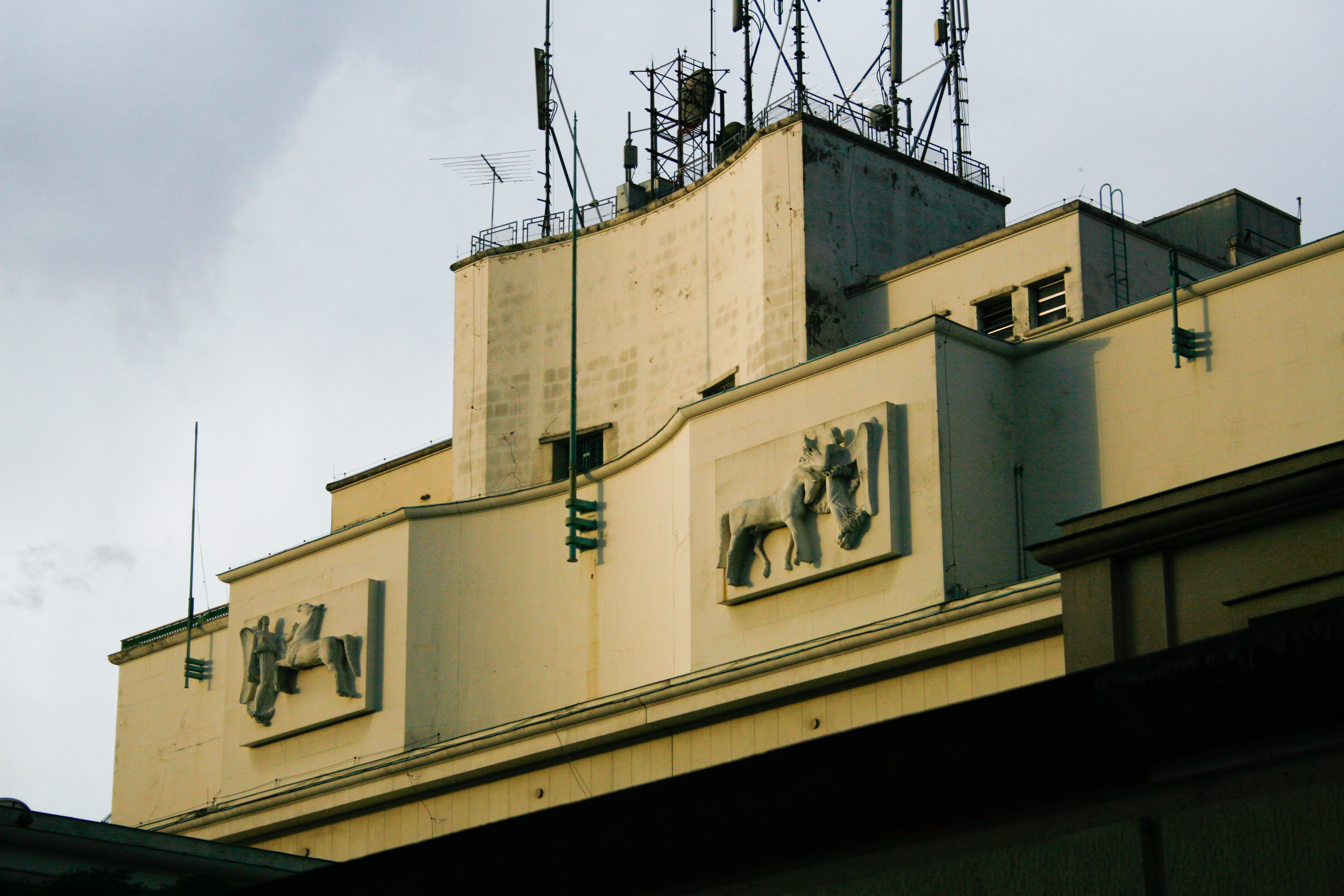
Detail of the building at the main entrance.

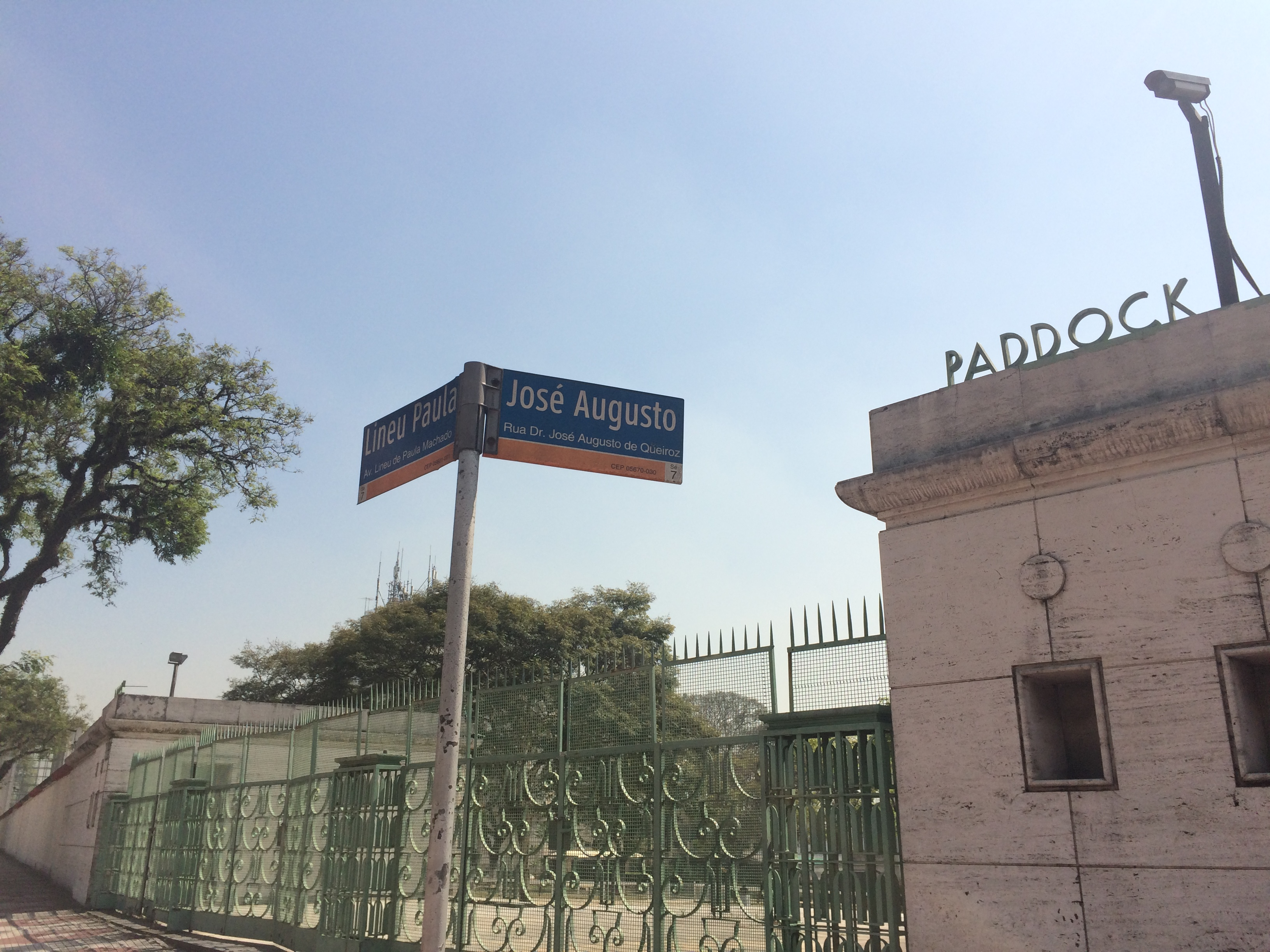
Corner of Lineu de Paula Machado Avenue and Doutor José Augusto de Queiroz Street.

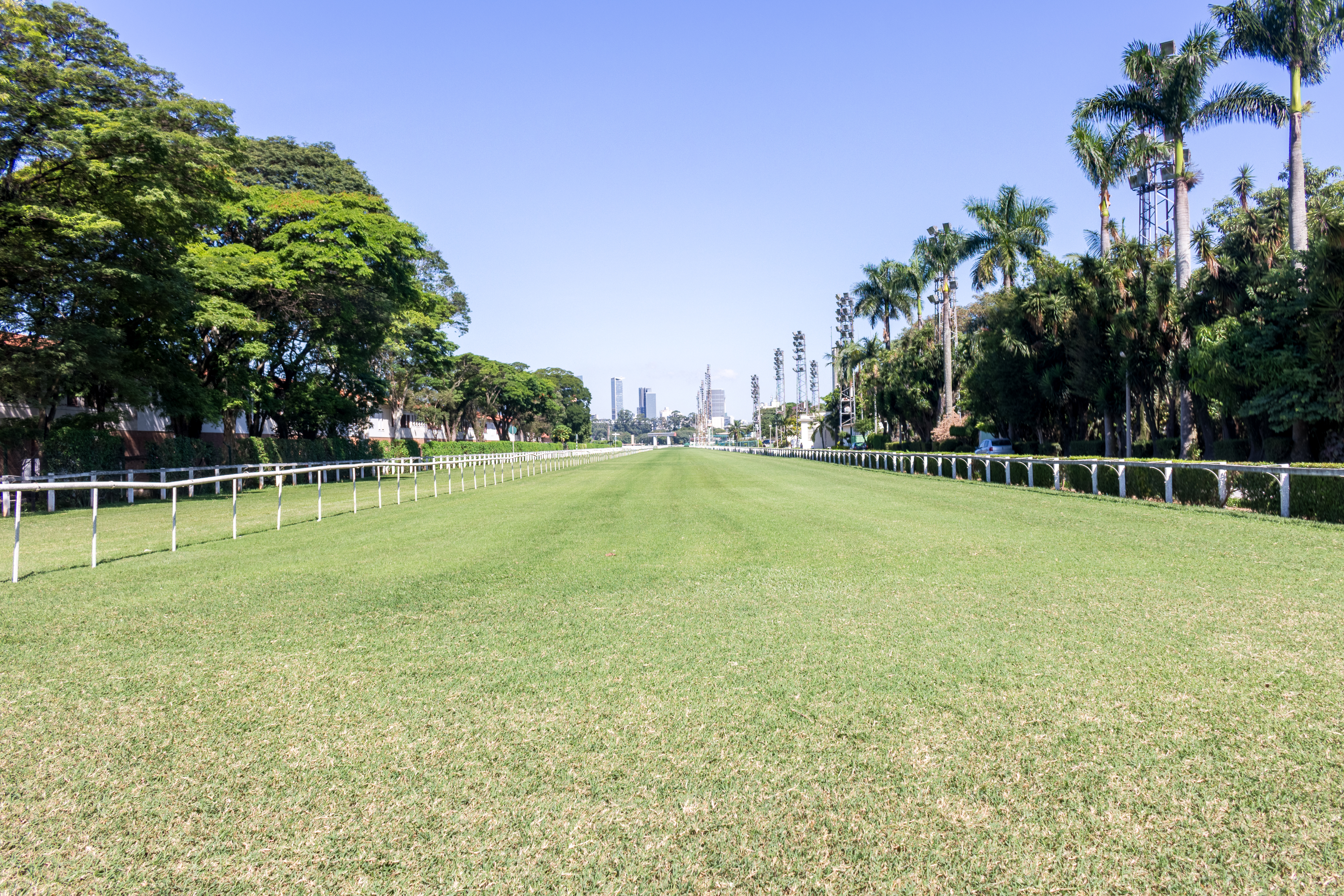
Jockey Club grass track.

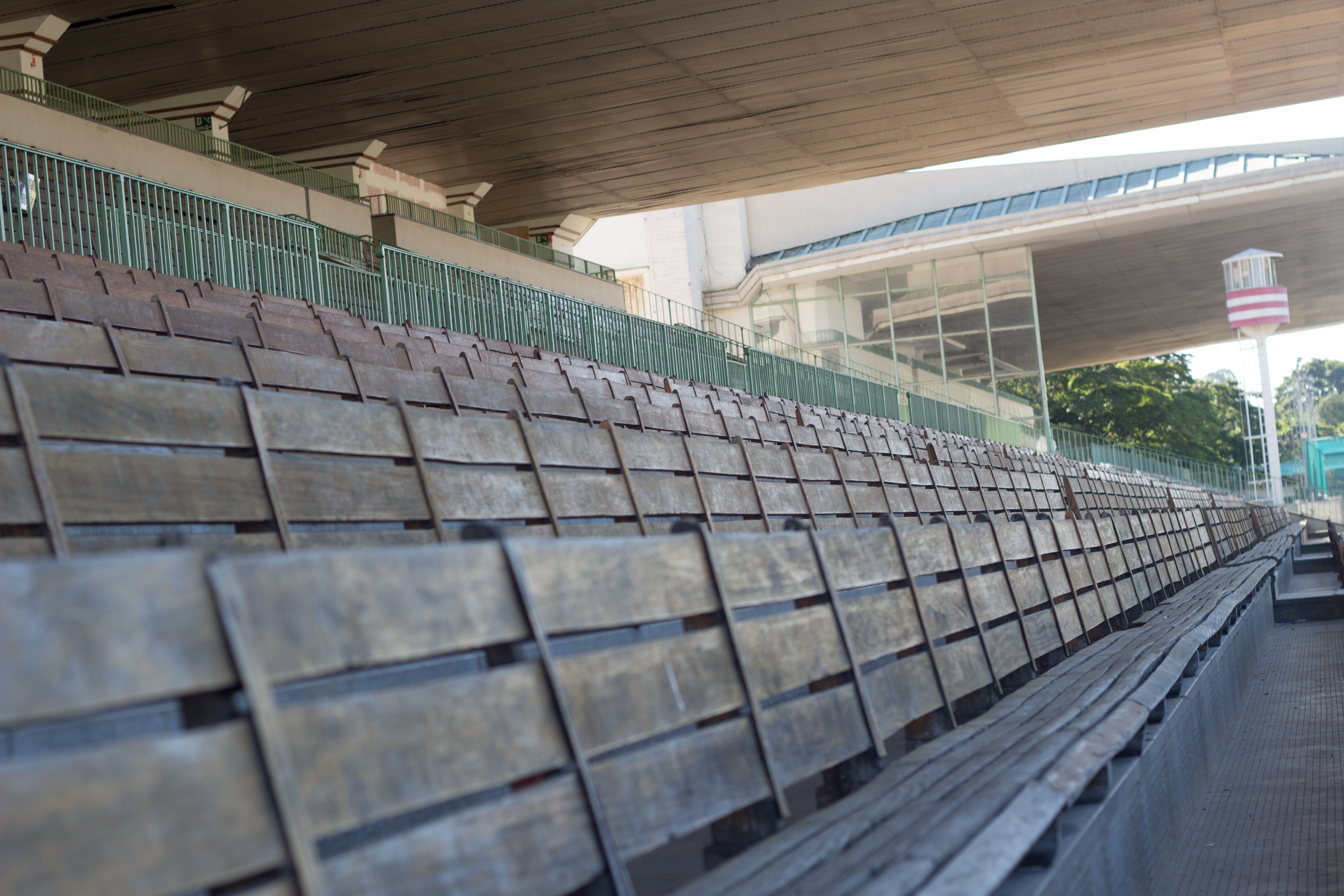
Jockey Club grandstand.

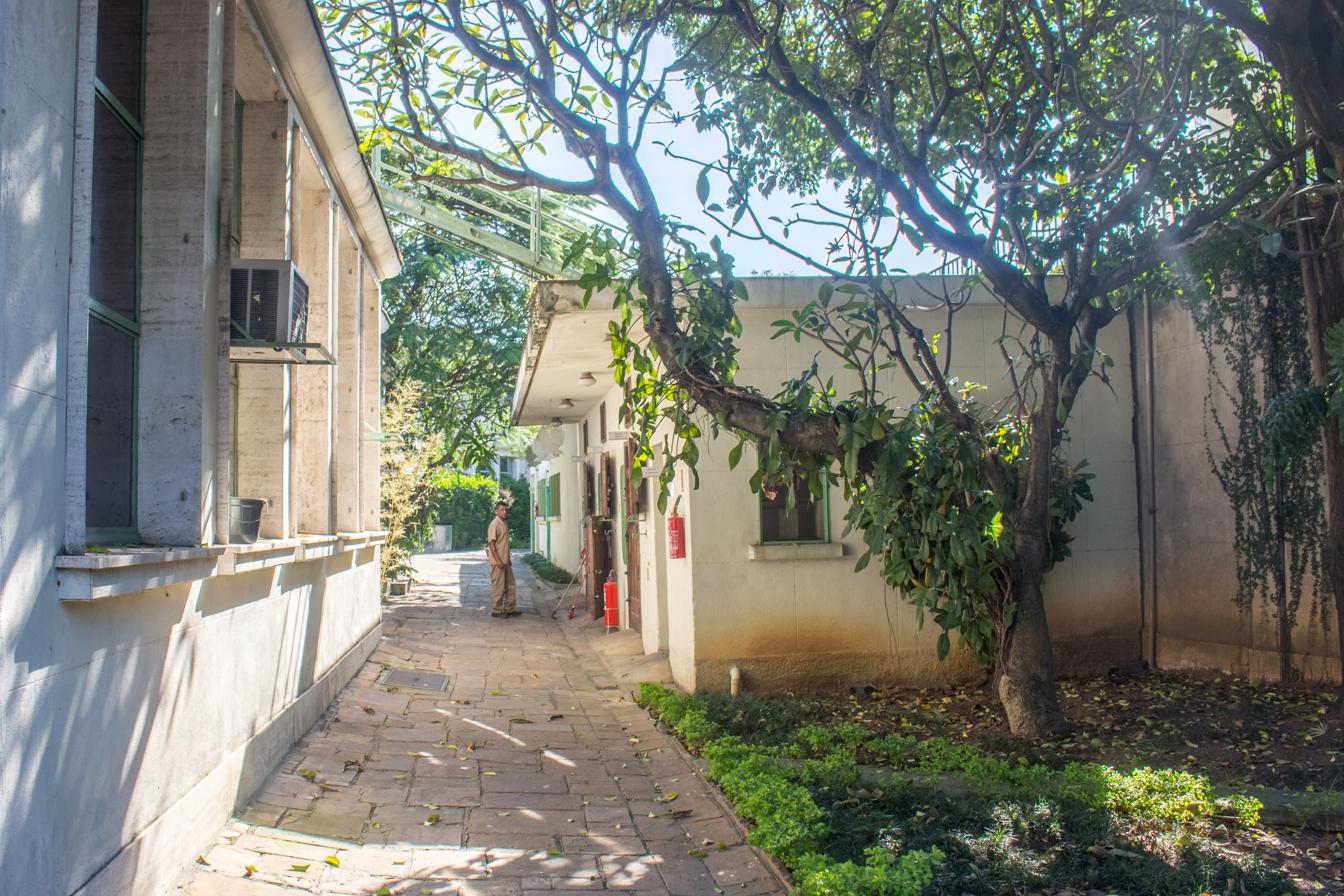
Jockey Club facilities.

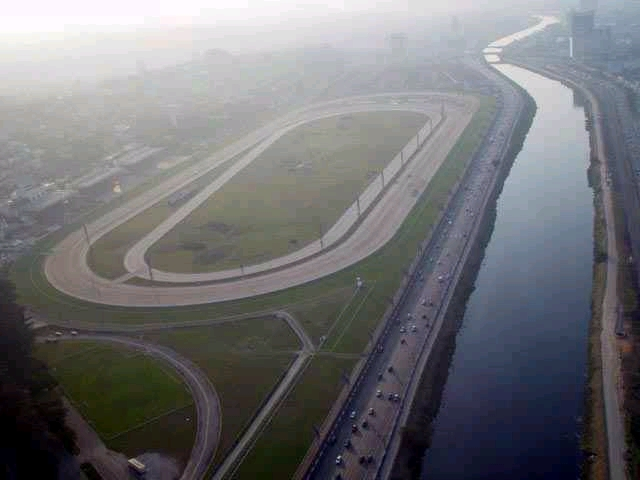
Aerial view of the Jockey Club, with the Marginal Pinheiros to the right of the image.

== See also ==
- Council for the Defense of Historical, Archaeological, Artistic and Tourist Heritage
