= Eusébio de Queirós =

Brazilian magistrate and politician

- Queirós, c. 1865

Minister of Justice
- In office 29 September 1848 – 11 May 1852
- Preceded by: Antônio de Campos Melo
- Succeeded by: José Ildefonso de Sousa

Personal details
- Born: 1812 Luanda, Portuguese Angola
- Died: 7 May 1868 (aged 55–56) Rio de Janeiro, Empire of Brazil

Eusébio de Queirós Coutinho Matoso da Câmara (1812 – 7 May 1868) was a Brazilian magistrate and politician, Minister of Justice (1848–1852) and author of one of the most important laws of the Empire of Brazil, the Eusébio de Queirós Law, which suppressed the slave trade and enabled its eventual eradication. He was also responsible for the Commercial Code of 1850 that still remains partly in force today.

== Early life ==
He was the son of Eusébio de Queirós Coutinho da Silva and Catarina Matoso de Queirós Câmara. Both his father and grandfather served as superintendent magistrate of Colonial Angola. When he was only three years old, his family moved to Rio de Janeiro, where the court of the prince regent of Portugal, future King John VI, was located. After exercising several positions as judge, his father was chosen to be a representative of Angola to the Constituent Cortes of 1820 (Constituent Assembly) in 1821, but soon joined the movement for the Independence of Brazil and was a member of the first Supreme Court of Justice of Brazil.

== Political career ==
Eusébio de Queirós graduated with a bachelor's degree in legal and social sciences from the Faculty of Law in Olinda in 1832. He was elected provincial representative as a Conservative for Rio de Janeiro in 1838. In 1842 he was elected to the National Assembly representing Rio de Janeiro, and was re-elected for four more terms.

He was Chief of Police in Rio de Janeiro. He also served as Minister of Justice from 1848 to 1852 under the government of Prime Minister Pedro de Araújo Lima. The position at that time included the command of the National Guard, the Ecclesiastical Affairs (nomination of bishops, payment of priests and bishops) and the appointment of judges and chiefs of police.

He was the author of one of the most important laws of the empire, the Eusébio de Queirós Law, promulgated on 4 September 1850, which prohibited the slave trade from Africa to Brazil. Although there had been similar laws before, it was under him as Minister of Justice that the Brazilian government for the first time acted effectively against the slave trade to Brazil (previous laws having been passed mainly to placate the British, who were committed to ending the slave trade internationally). Since he had been Chief of Police in Rio de Janeiro, he knew each of the places where smuggled Africans could be hidden. He also had good connections with the Rio businessmen who trafficked slaves from Africa. Using his information and relationships, he acted with severity in repressing the prohibited traffic, ensuring that it ceased abruptly.

He steered through the law of 25 June 1850 enacting the first Commercial Code of Brazil. This remained in force until 2002 when the new Brazilian Civil Code incorporated Commercial Law. Until today, however, it remains in effect part of the Maritime Law of the Commercial Code of 1850.

He promulgated the Land Law which extinguished traditional land grants and obliged public lands to be acquired by open auction, but also prevented newly arrived immigrants from buying land. He deployed the first law-based penitentiary system in Brazil, dedicating long stretches of his ministerial reports to the subject. He also worked with Irineu Evangelista de Sousa to install the first gas lighting in Rio de Janeiro.

After serving as a minister, he was a judge, senator (1854) and member of the Council of State (1855). He was appointed Minister of the Supreme Court of Justice by decree of 1 March 1864. As this position was incompatible with that of State Councilor, he then asked for retirement, which was granted by Pedro II in a decree dated 21 March 1864. In the year of his death, he resided in Santa Teresa Street No. 9, in Rio de Janeiro.

== Family life ==
Eusébio de Queirós Matoso Ribeiro married Dona Raquel Francisca Castro Carneiro da Silva in Quissamã. She was the daughter of his political ally José Carneiro da Silva, the first Baron and first Viscount of Araruama, leader of the Conservative Party in Rio de Janeiro.

His son Manuel de Queirós Matoso Ribeiro also married, in Quissamã, Dona Anna Francisca de Loreto Lima Carneiro da Silva, daughter of Manuel Carneiro da Silva, viscount of Ururaí. His daughter Catarina de Queirós Matoso Ribeiro married, in São Paulo, Rodrigo Augusto da Silva, son of his political ally José Manuel da Silva, Baron of Tietê, leader of the Conservative Party in São Paulo.

Eusébio was great-grandfather of Eusébio de Queirós Matoso Barbosa, a major businessman in the capital of São Paulo; great-great-grandfather of the historian Gilberto de Queirós Matoso, as well as of two mayors of Quissamã, Arnaldo de Queirós Matoso and Armando Cunha Carneiro da Silva.

== Legacy ==
The municipality of Eusébio, Ceará is named after him.
