= Rodrigo Augusto da Silva =

Brazilian politician (1833–1889)

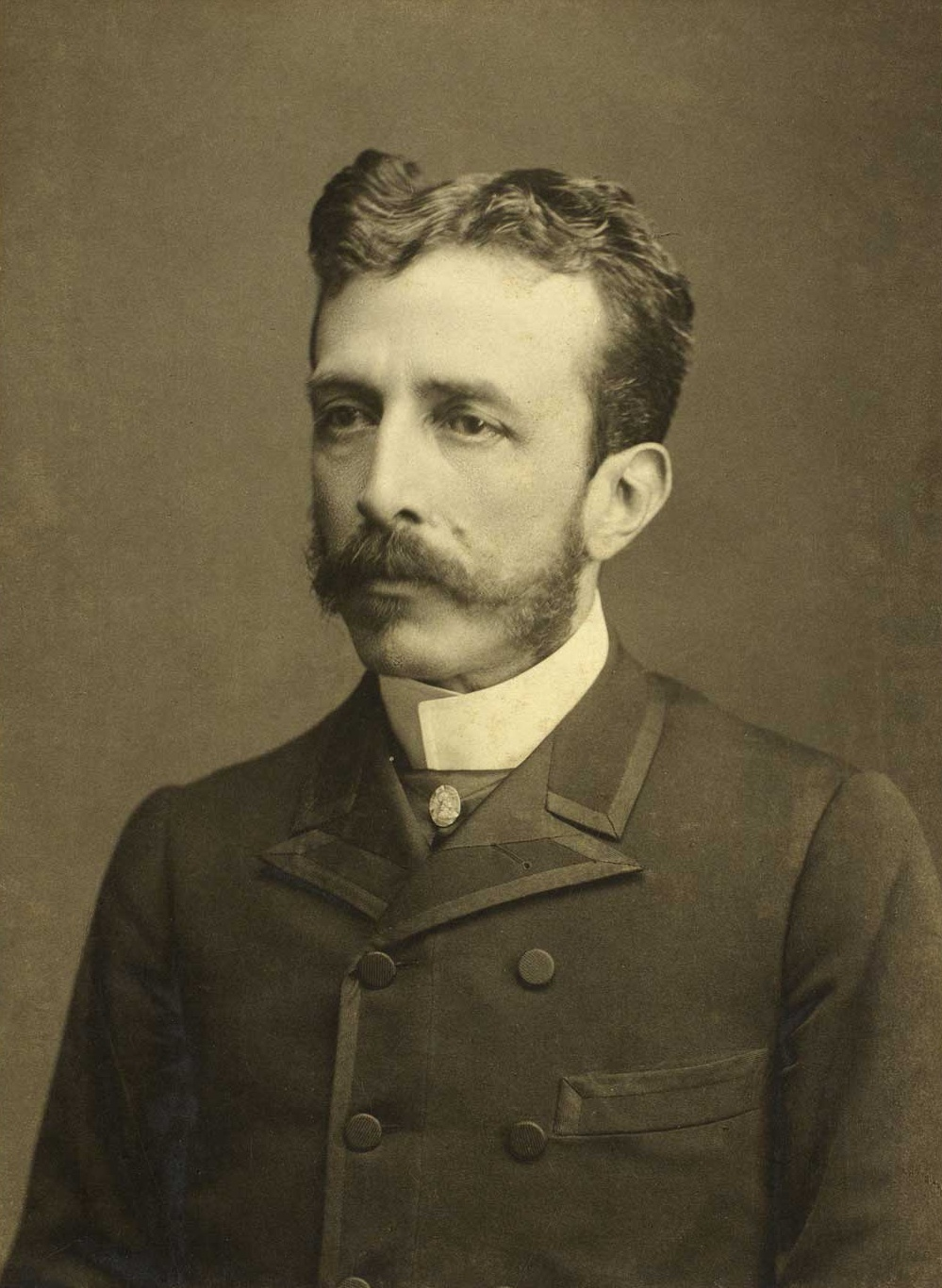
- Silva, c. 1887–89

Senator for São Paulo
- In office 10 August 1888 – 17 October 1889; Life tenure
- Preceded by: João da Silva Carrão

Minister of Foreign Affairs
- In office 27 June 1888 – 7 June 1889
- Prime Minister: João Alfredo Correia de Oliveira
- Preceded by: Antônio Prado
- Succeeded by: José Francisco Diana

Secretary of Agriculture, Trade and Public Works
- In office 10 May 1887 – 27 June 1888
- Prime Minister: The Baron of Cotejipe; João Alfredo Correia de Oliveira
- Preceded by: Antônio Prado
- Succeeded by: Antônio Prado
- In office 5 January 1889 – 7 June 1889
- Prime Minister: João Alfredo Correia de Oliveira
- Preceded by: Antônio Prado
- Succeeded by: Lourenço Cavalcanti de Albuquerque

Personal details
- Born: 7 December 1833 São Paulo, Empire of Brazil
- Died: 17 October 1889 (aged 55) Rio de Janeiro, Empire of Brazil
- Party: Conservative
- Spouse: Catharina de Queirós Mattoso Ribeiro
- Occupation: Politician
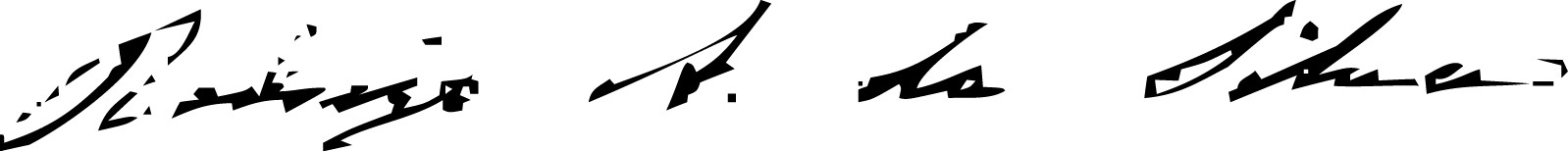
- Signature

Rodrigo Augusto da Silva (7 December 1833 — 17 October 1889), nicknamed "the diplomat", was a politician, diplomat, lawyer, monarchist and journalist of the Empire of Brazil. He is best known as the minister that authored and countersigned with Princess Isabel, then Princess Imperial Regent the law that ended slavery in Brazil. Rodrigo was born in São Paulo into a family of wealthy financiers. His father, the Baron of Tietê, was also a politician and leader of the Conservative Party in São Paulo.

Rodrigo became a deputy in the Chamber of Deputies of Brazil when he was 24 years old and served a total of seven terms representing the province of São Paulo. He later served as President of the Legislative Assembly of São Paulo, cabinet minister in two conservative governments and senator of the empire. Even though he died relatively young his career lasted over 30 years. In his first year as a deputy and throughout his career he defended policies to increase immigration from Europe, industrialization of the empire, improvement of infrastructure, modernization of the financial system and access to credit for the agricultural sector.

== Early life ==
Rodrigo Augusto da Silva was born on 7 December 1833, in the imperial city of São Paulo, capital of the province of São Paulo. He was the son of José Manuel da Silva and Maria Reducinda da Cunha e Silva. He had one older brother named Candido Justiniano and two sisters, named Raphaela and Joaquina Angelica. Rodrigo was the paternal grandson of José da Silva de Carvalho, a municipal judge and commanding officer of the Portuguese ordinances in Santo Amaro. Rodrigo's grandfather was a wealthy land owner and capitalist that acted as a private mortgage lender. Rodrigo's father followed his father's steps and got involved in commerce and finance in the city of São Paulo. In his banking career José Manuel became president of the São Paulo branch of the Bank of Brazil and the Caixa Econômica. As a leader of the moderate party, later conservative party, José Manuel was part of the government of São Paulo in the years after the Independence of Brazil, serving in different positions in the municipal and provincial governments.

Rodrigo attended the Largo de São Francisco Law School where he graduated with a Bachelor of Laws degree in 1856. In law school he was a member of a secret society called Brasilica. This society was founded by law students and had as its main objective the strengthening of conservative ideas. The society counted among the initiated political figures connected to Rodrigo and the conservative party, among them Antonio da Silva Prado, Thomas Coelho and Delfino Cintra. According to a biographer, in his academic years Rodrigo "revealed a lucid and easy intelligence, firmness of character, unbreakable dedication, clear vision and noble political ideas." Rodrigo spoke and wrote notoriously well, had a passion for classical literature and knew how to dress with great elegance. These characteristics would later afford him the nickname "the diplomat".^{[note 2]} While still a student in 1856 he was elected to the Legislative Assembly of São Paulo, he finished his senior year and occupied a seat in the Legislative Assembly at the same time. In 1857 he moved to Rio de Janeiro to occupy a seat in the Chamber of Deputies, Rodrigo was a permanent substitute and represented the 1st district of São Paulo. In Rio de Janeiro he married Catharina de Queirós Mattoso Ribeiro, daughter of conservative leader Eusébio de Queirós. Catharina would die during the birth of Maria Custodia, the couple's only child.

== Political career ==
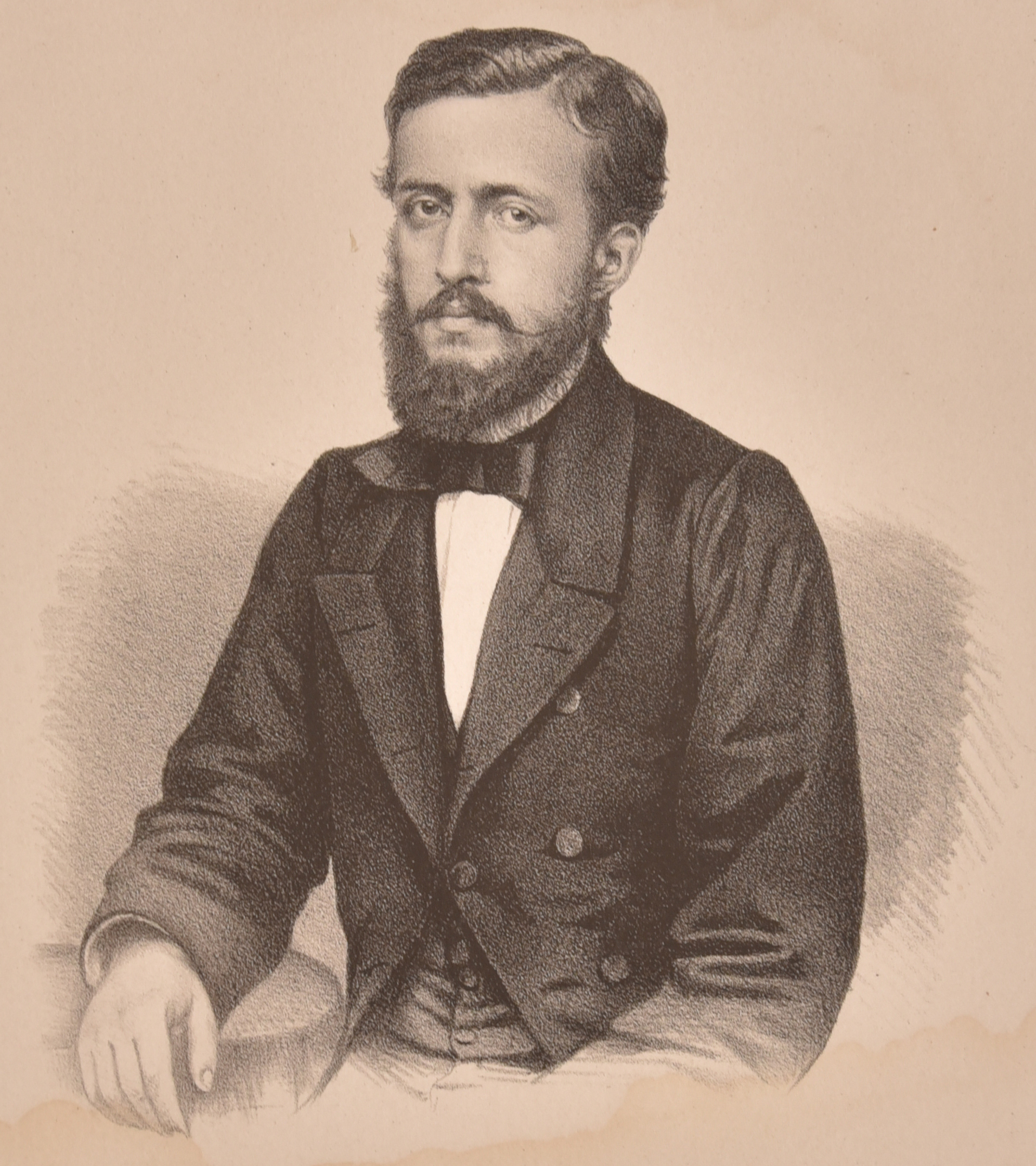
A portrait of Rodrigo Augusto da Silva at the beginning of his political career. Lithograph by S. A. Sisson, 1861.

=== Conservative politician ===
In 1885 conflict among different interest groups created a crisis in the Liberal government. ^{[note 1]}

== Later years ==
=== Death ===
After months of suffering Rodrigo died surrounded by his friends, among them writer Machado de Assis. His death caused wide commotion in the empire. Rodrigo's funeral was watched by members of the government, the abolitionist movement and leaders of the black community. Official mourning was declared and the Ministry of Agriculture, Commerce and Public works; the Senate; the Chamber of Deputies; and the Postal Service were closed.

The New York Times published the following regarding his death on the 24 November 1889:

We have to record the death of another prominent man in Brazilian politics, that of Counselor Rodrigo Augusto da Silva, which took place at his residence in this city (Rio de Janeiro), at 8:30 P.M. on the 17th inst. He was a prominent and popular member of the Conservative party, a native of Sao Paulo, which province he represented in the Senate, and had twice occupied positions in the Imperial Cabinet. He was Minister of Agriculture in the Joao Alfredo Cabinet which passed the abolition law of 1888, and was still in the prime of life.

== Titles and honors ==
=== Titles ===
- Privy Councillor of His Majesty the Emperor.

=== Other Titles ===
- President of the Auxiliary Association for the Progress of the Province of São Paulo.
- Counselor of the Irmandade de Nossa Senhora da Consolação e S. João Baptista (São Paulo), Steward in 1878.

=== Honors ===
- Grand Cross of the Pontifical Equestrian Order of St. Gregory the Great.
- Grand Cross of the Portuguese Order of Christ.
- Grand Cross of the Portuguese Order of the Immaculate Conception of Vila Viçosa.
- Grand Cross of the French Légion d'honneur.
- Grand Cross of the Spanish Order of Isabella the Catholic.

== Notes ==
- ^[note 1] The timing of the crisis was delicate since republicanism was no longer only an idea but a threat. To aggravate the situation Dom Pedro II was becoming indifferent to the threats of a republic, as he declared to Counselor Saraiva: "It will be my retirement. I will become a teacher!" The emperor's heiress, Princess Isabel had little support in the ruling classes and was connected to an ultraconservative Catholic movement. When Dom Pedro II asked Counselor Saraiva what he thought of his daughter's future reign, he ironically replied: "The kingdom of your daughter is not of this world". Rodrigo, answering for the conservatives on 8 June 1885 declared in the Chamber of Deputies: "If, after more than half a century of battles, of efforts, of immense sacrifices, we arrived at this deplorable state of the system that rules over us, with reason those three representatives of the new idea (pointing to the three republican deputies) can ask us with contempt in their lips: what have you obtained with this form of government, that you judge to be in this country the only guarantee of political order and also the only guarantee of stability for all rights and social interests? I finish by saying that it is the case to say, as an eminent parliamentary of the time of Charles X: 'Nothing remains for us to do here. Let's go to our windows watch the funerals of the monarchy passing by'!"
- ^[note 2] In the words of Egas: "Rodrigo Silva was called the diplomat for his distinct manners and for his notorious elegance in dressing and presenting himself. He wrote and spoke brilliantly."
