= Antônio Francisco de Paula Sousa =

Brazilian politician

Antônio Paula Sousa
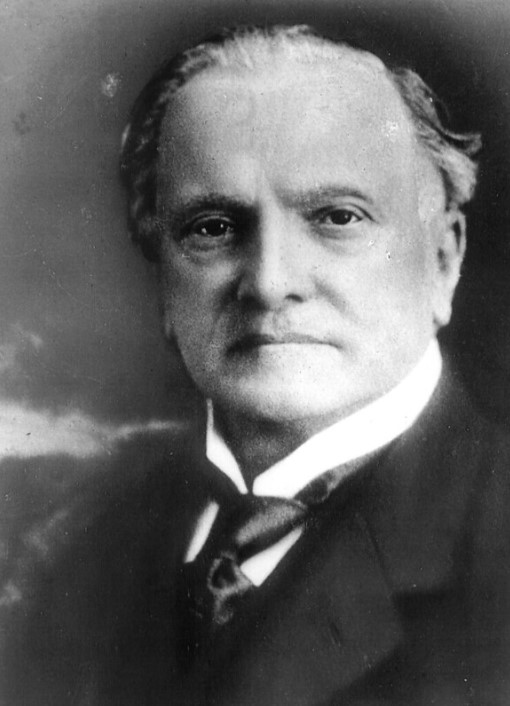
- Born: December 6, 1843; Itu, São Paulo, Empire of Brazil
- Died: April 13, 1917 (aged 73); São Paulo, São Paulo, Brazil
- Education: Karlsruhe Institute of Technology
- Occupations: Politician, engineer
- Spouse: Ada Virginie Herwegh

Signature
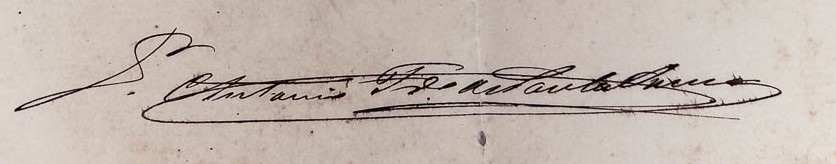

Antônio Francisco de Paula Sousa (December 6, 1843 – April 13, 1917) was a Brazilian engineer and politician. He served as Minister of Agriculture from 1865 to 1866, as Minister of Foreign Affairs from 1892 to 1893, and as Minister of Industry in 1893. He was one of the founders and the first director of the Polytechnic School of São Paulo, now part of the University of São Paulo.

An autonomous public agency responsible for administering technical high schools, Centro Estadual de Educação Tecnológica Paula Souza [pt], is named after him.

== Biography ==
Born in Itu into a wealthy family with ties to the nobility, the grandson of Francisco de Paula Sousa e Melo, Sousa studied in São Paulo and Petrópolis before moving to Dresden at age 15 to complete his secondary education. In 1861, he enrolled at ETH Zurich. Inspired by libertarian ideals, he headed towards Milan to join the Camicie Rosse, but abandoned his plan upon learning of the arrest of Giuseppe Garibaldi. Sousa later transferred to the Karlsruhe Institute of Technology, where he studied chemistry.

Following his return to Brazil in 1867, Sousa began working for railway companies. He was present at the Convention of Itu, becoming one of the founding members of the Paulista Republican Party. In 1878, he visited the Exposition Universelle.
