= São Bento Street =

Street in São Paulo

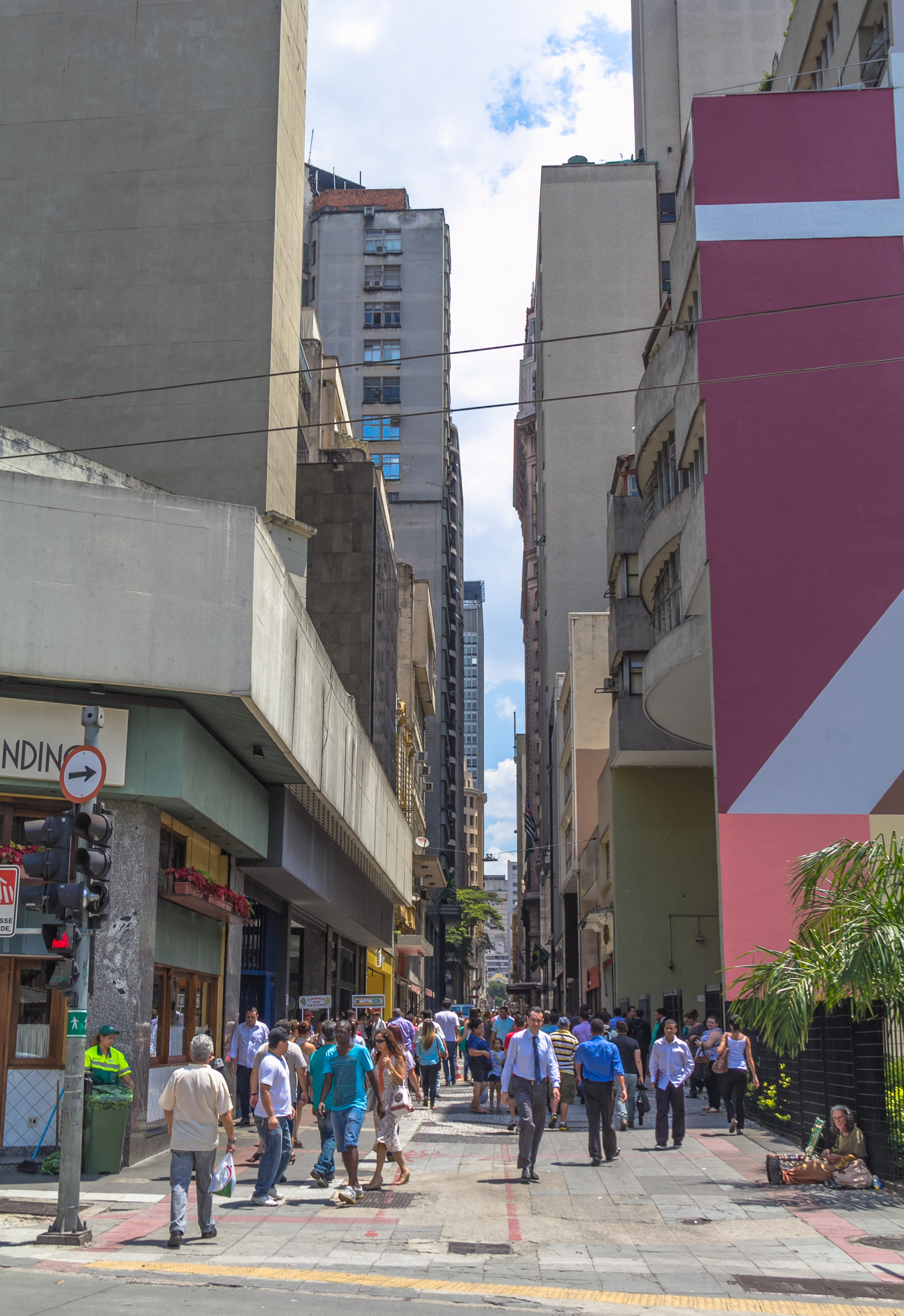
- São Bento Street seen from Largo de São Bento

- Location within São Paulo
- Length: 570 m (1,870 ft)
- Location: São Paulo, São Paulo; Brazil
- Coordinates: 23°32′50.92″S 46°38′9.33″W

São Bento Street (Portuguese: Rua São Bento) is a historic road located in the Sé district, in the center of the Brazilian city of São Paulo. It starts at Largo São Francisco, next to José Bonifácio Street, and passes through Patriarca Square, Direita Street, Quitanda Street, Largo do Café, Miguel Couto Street and Antonio Prado Square. It ends at Boa Vista Street, in Largo São Bento. Currently, it is predominantly commercial. It includes the Martinelli Building, whose main entrance is accessed from São Bento Street.

== History ==
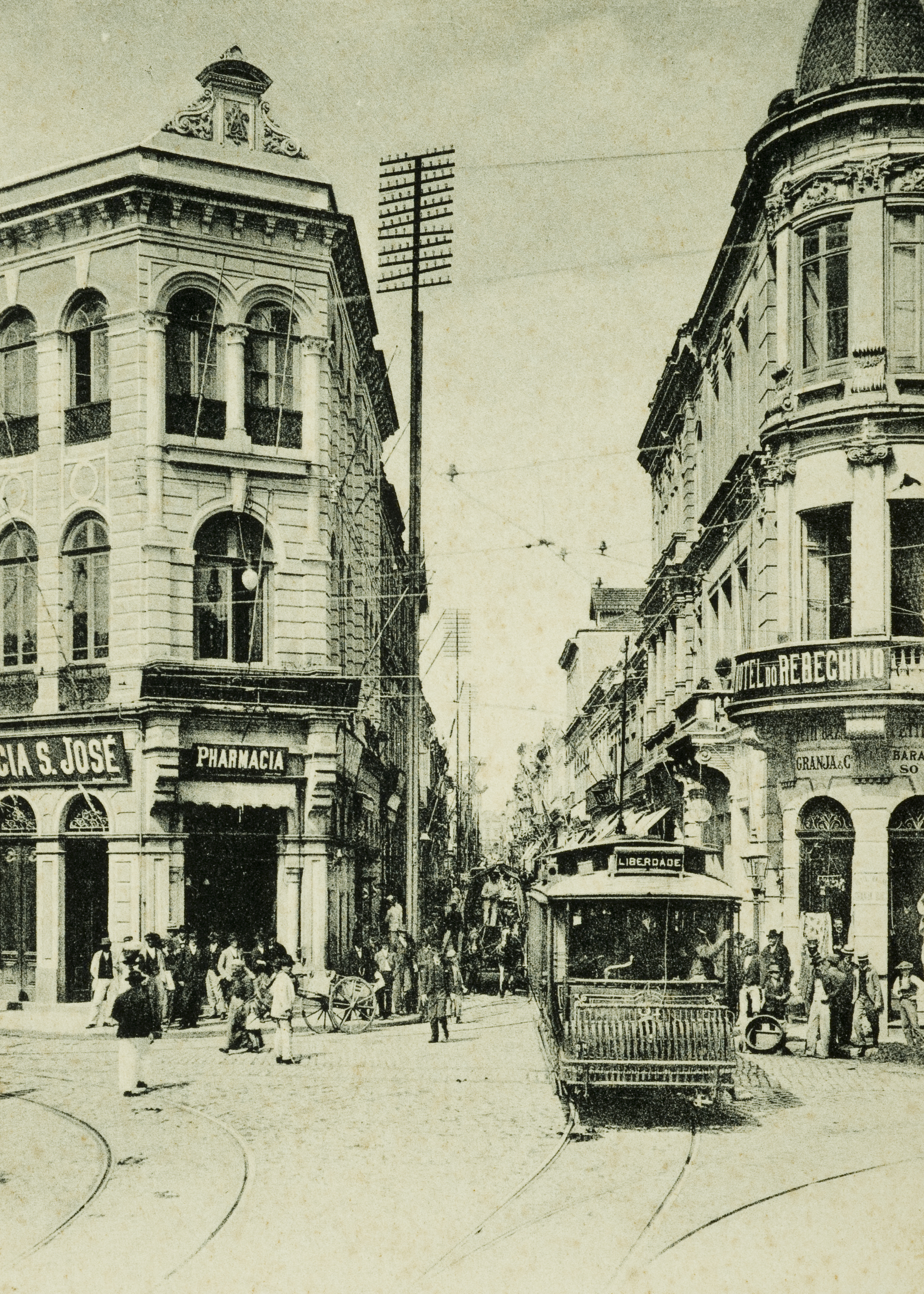
São Bento Street in 1905, photograph by Guilherme Gaensly.

Opened in the 16th century, São Bento Street is one of the oldest thoroughfares in São Paulo. Initially, it consisted of a simple dirt track linking the old village of the cacique Tibiriçá (now Largo São Bento) to the vicinity of Direita Street. The name refers to the Monastery of Saint Benedict, located in Largo São Bento. The site was donated by the São Paulo City Council in 1600 to the monks for the construction of the church.

It was first called Martim Afonso Tibiriçá Street. After the construction of the Convent of Saint Francis, inaugurated on September 17, 1647, it became known as Rua que Vai para São Francisco (English: Street leading to Saint Francis). Later, it was renamed Rua de São Bento para São Francisco (Street from Saint Benedict to Saint Francis) and Rua que Vai para São Bento (Street leading to Saint Benedict).

On March 12, 1897, the São Paulo City Council changed the name to Coronel Moreira César Street, after the military commander who had been killed in the War of Canudos. The measure did not please the population; on August 28, 1899, Law No. 416 ordered that it be renamed São Bento Street. Historical studies suggest that the street was the site of the São Paulo City Hall in 1619.

== See also ==
- Tourism in the city of São Paulo
