= Antônio Prado Square =

Public space in São Paulo, Brazil

- Praça Antônio Prado
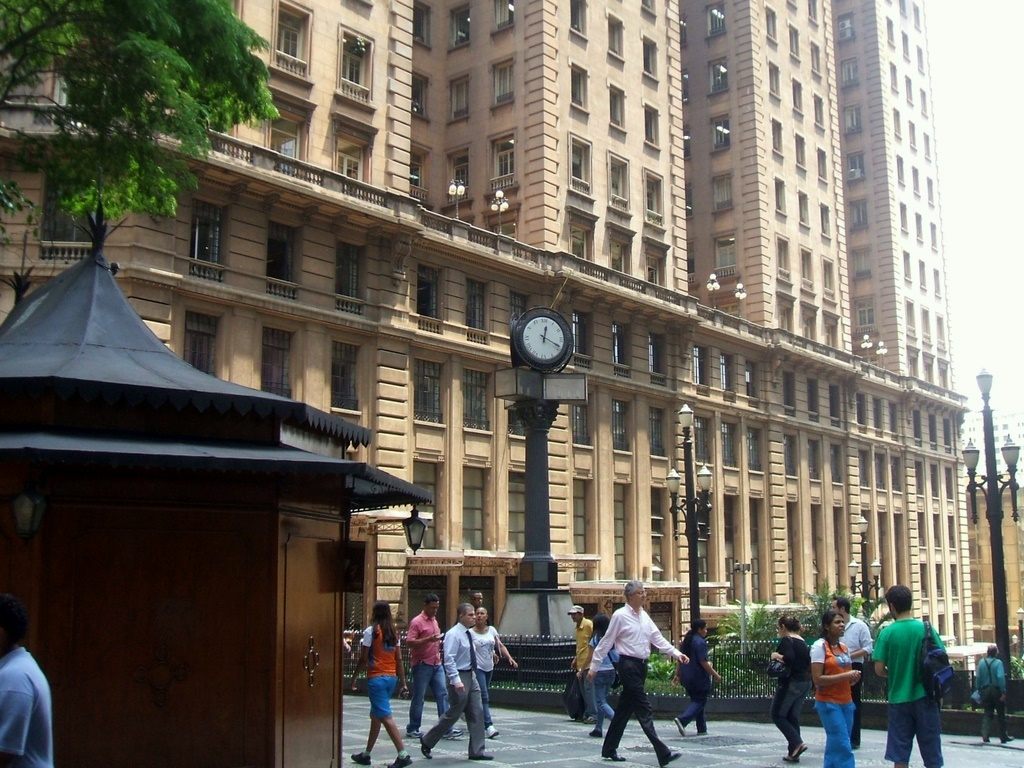
- View of Antônio Prado Square, in the background the Martinelli Building.
- Interactive map of Antônio Prado Square
- Type: Public square
- Location: São Paulo, São Paulo; Brazil
- Coordinates: 23°32′45″S 46°38′03″W

Antônio Prado Square (Portuguese: Praça Antônio Prado), formerly known as Largo do Rosário, is located in the Sé district of the Brazilian city of São Paulo. São Bento, João Brícola and Quinze de Novembro streets intersect at the square.

== History ==
The square's current name is a tribute to Antônio da Silva Prado, a coffee grower, banker, jurist, journalist and politician who held several public positions throughout his life. As mayor of São Paulo, he implemented major urban improvements, such as the straightening of many streets in the city center. The square, which once housed the old Church of the Rosary of Black Men, received the city's first monument in honor of Zumbi dos Palmares at the end of 2016.

Today, the site preserves architectural influences from the 20th century, such as the wooden kiosks selling newspapers and magazines and offering services such as public telephones and shoeshine.

== Nichile's public clock ==
Antônio Prado Square is home to Nichile's last public clock, which measures 8 meters (26 ft) and was registered in 1992 for its historical value. It was built in 1935 and, since Octávio de Nichile's death in 1986, it has been maintained by his family. There were a total of six clocks spread across the city of São Paulo in areas such as Largo do Arouche and Sé Square. Their implementation resulted from the work of executive Octávio de Nichile, who sold the advertising spaces in the structure of the poles that supported the clocks.

== Gallery ==
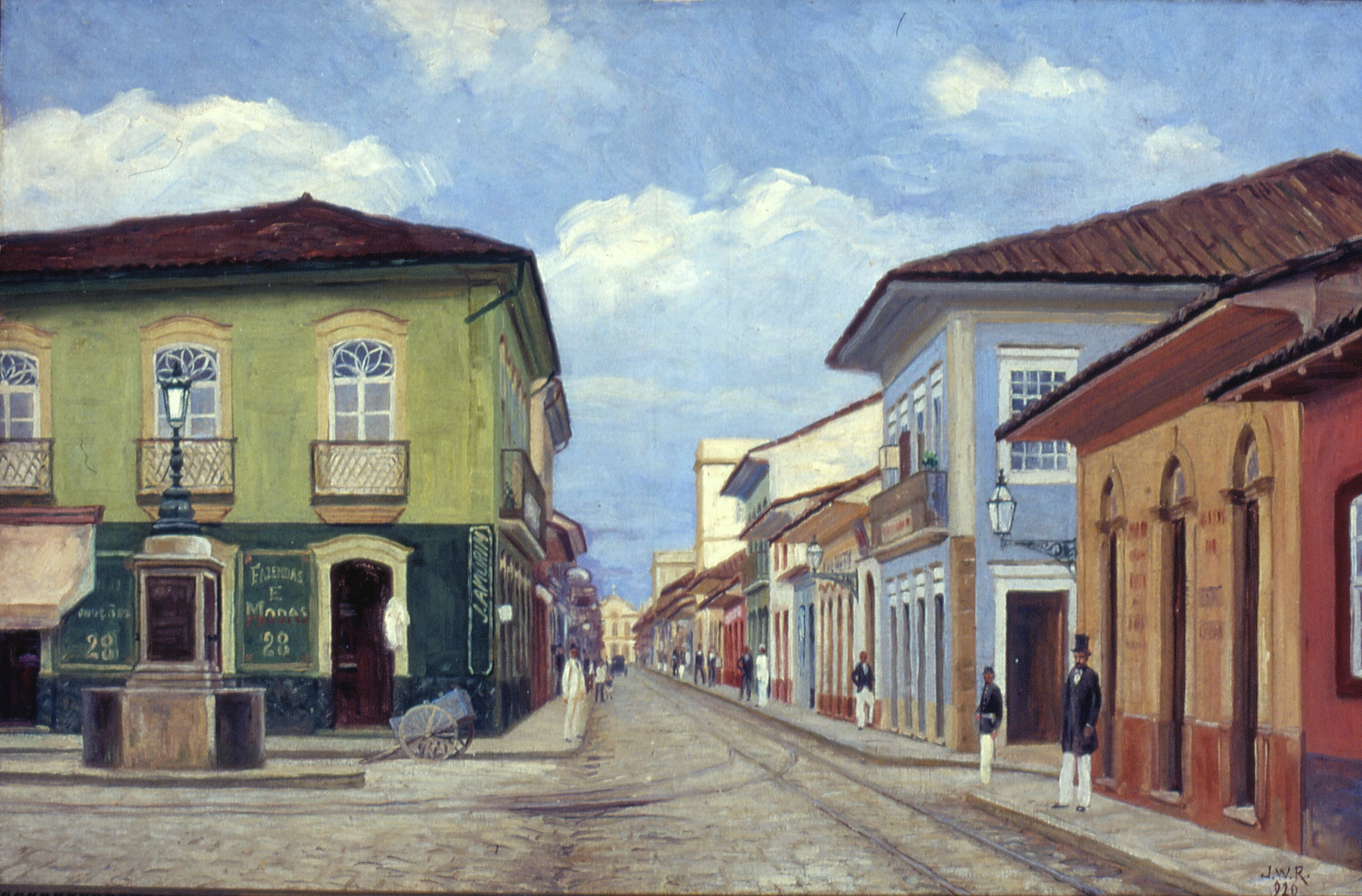
Largo do Rosário (1880), by José Wasth Rodrigues, Collection of the Paulista Museum of USP.

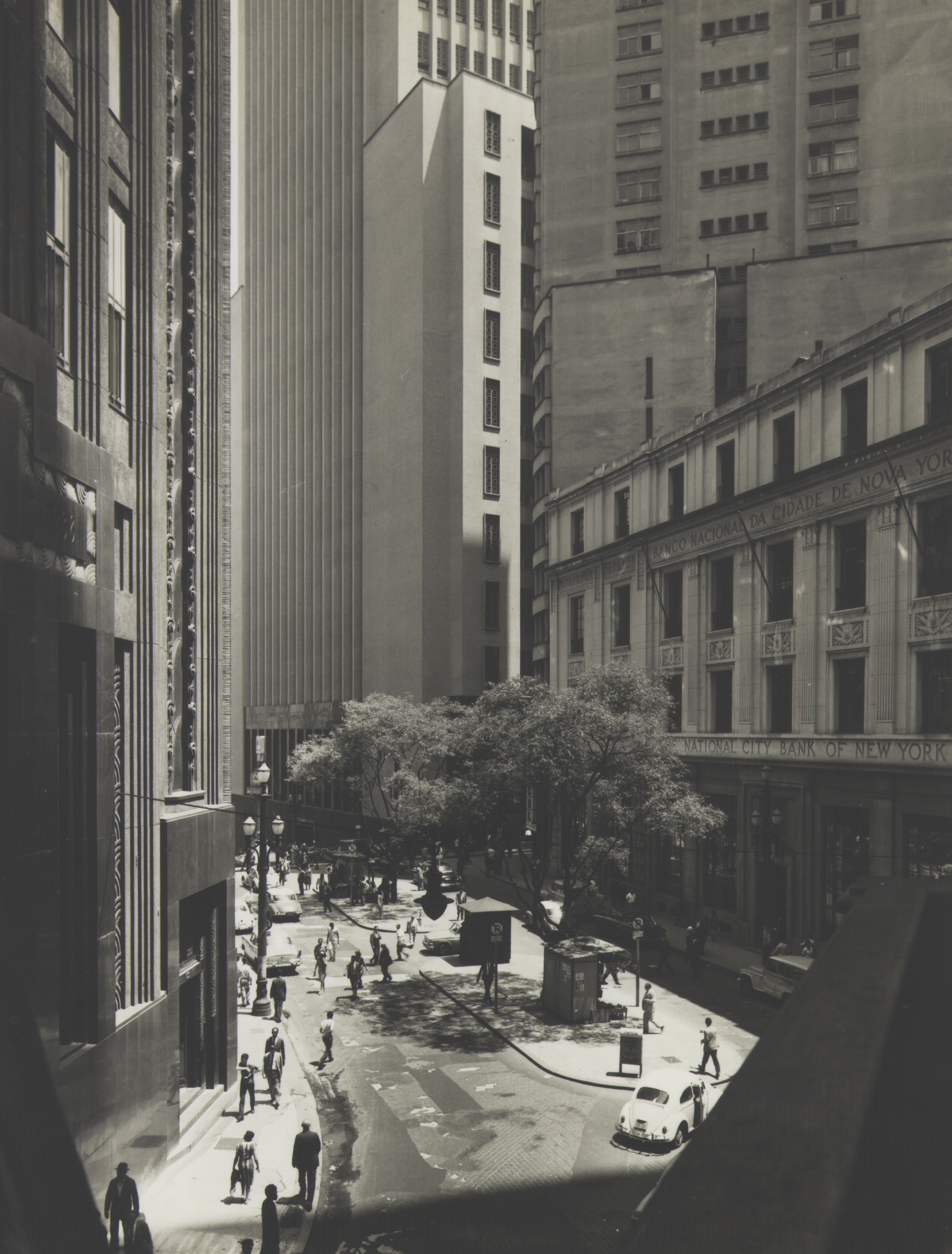
View of the Antônio Prado Square.

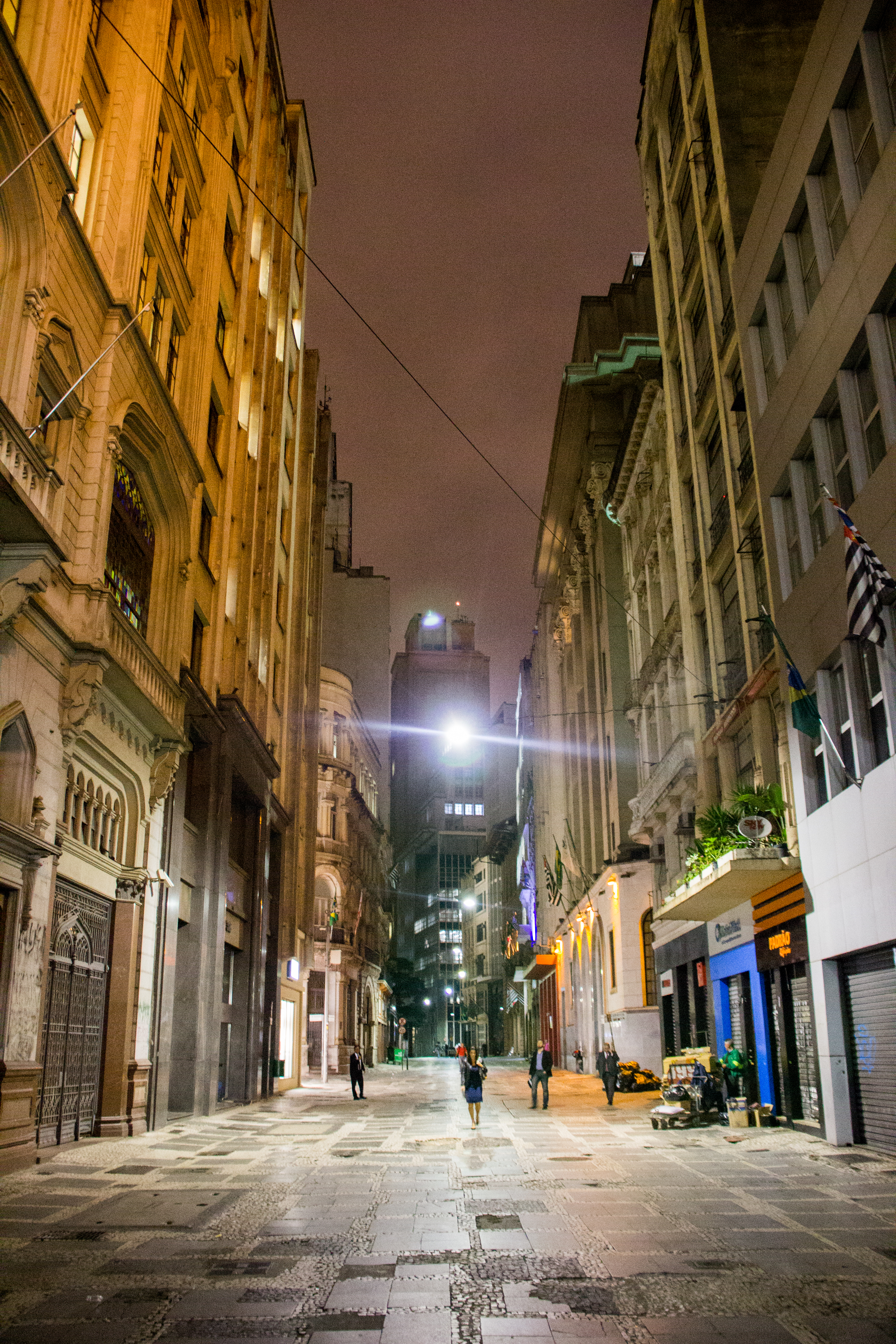
Night Walk on 23 November 2017.

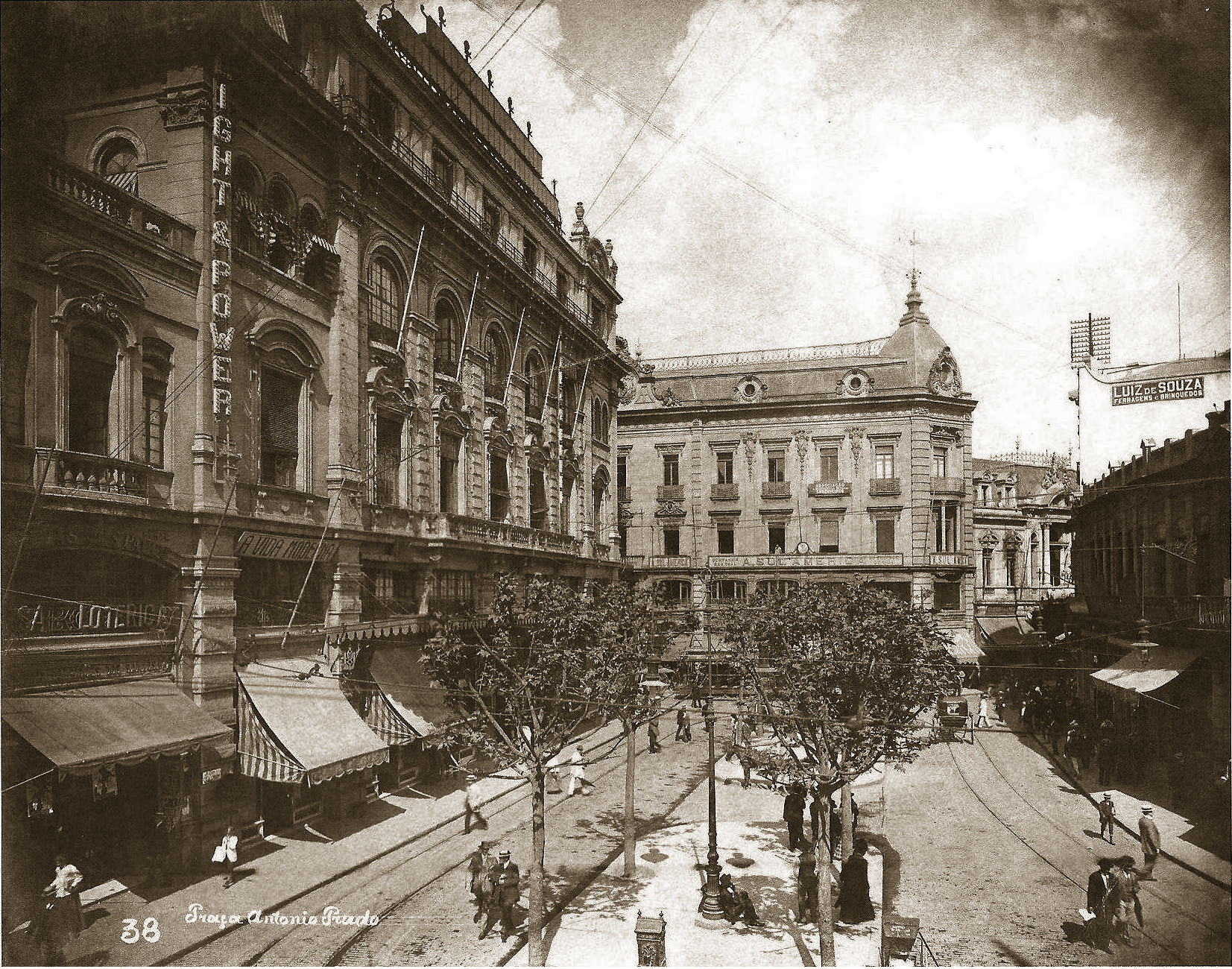
Antonio Prado Square in 1915.

== See also ==
- Central Zone of São Paulo
- Tourism in the city of São Paulo
