= José Manuel da Silva, Baron of Tietê =

Brazilian politician and private banker

José Manuel da Silva
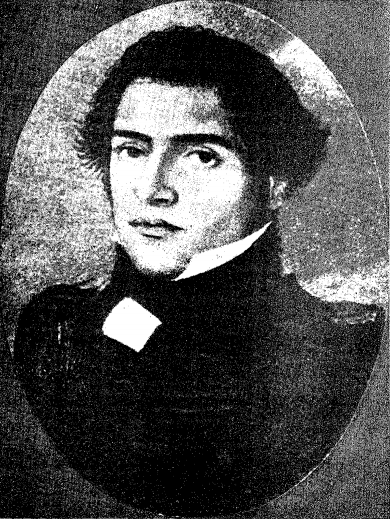

Personal details
- Born: 1793 Santo Amaro, Colonial Brazil
- Died: 27 March 1877 (aged 83–84) São Paulo, Empire of Brazil
- Children: 4, including Rodrigo Augusto
- Occupation: Banker, politician

José Manuel da Silva, Baron of Tietê (Brazilian Portuguese: [ʒoˈzɛ mɐnuˈɛw da ˈsiwvɐ tʃi.eˈte]; 1793 – 27 March 1877) was a Brazilian banker and politician from São Paulo. He was a member of the general council of the province and was elected to the Chamber of Deputies in Rio de Janeiro and the triple list of candidates for a senate seat. José Manuel was vice-president of São Paulo on multiple occasions during his lifetime, serving for the first time in 1839. He acted as interim president of the province of São Paulo in 1852, 1868 and 1871.
