= David Patterson =

David Patterson may refer to:

- David Patterson (computer scientist) (born 1947), American professor of computer science at UC Berkeley
- Dave Patterson (born 1956), American baseball player
- David Patterson (guitarist) (born 1966), American guitarist who was a founding member of the New World Guitar Trio
- David Patterson (American football) (born 1985), defensive lineman for the Ohio State Buckeyes and the Atlanta Falcons
- David J. Patterson (born 1950), Irish biologist
- David P. Patterson (c.1840–1879), director of New Jersey and New York Railroad, and a town father of Hillsdale, New Jersey
- David T. Patterson (1818–1891), American politician; Democrat from Tennessee; in U.S. Senate 1866–69
- David Allen Patterson, professor, researcher, author and Native American advocate
- David Patterson (historian), who mainly researches the Holocaust, Jewish thought, and antisemitism
- Davie Patterson (1871–1945), Scotland international rugby union player

== See also ==
- 46053 Davidpatterson, asteroid named after American amateur astronomer
- David Paterson (born 1954), 55th governor of New York, 2008–2010
- David Paterson (disambiguation)
- David Peterson (born 1943), twentieth premier of Ontario, 1985–1990
- David Patterson Dyer (1838–1924), American politician; Republican from Missouri; in U.S. Congress 1869–71
- David Patterson Ellerman (born 1943), philosopher and author
