= Yara Bernette =

- before 2 November 1947

Background information
- Born: Bernette Epstein; March 14, 1920; Boston, Massachusetts, US
- Died: March 31, 2002 (aged 82) São Paulo, Brazil
- Genres: Classical, Romantic
- Occupations: Pianist; Teacher; Chair Hochschule für Musik und Theater Hamburg
- Instrument: Piano
- Years active: 1938–1995

Bernette Epstein, known as Yara Bernette (March 14, 1920 – March 31, 2002), was a Brazilian classical pianist. Considered one of Brazil's foremost pianists of the twentieth century, she achieved international renown for her performance of Classical and Romantic works, notably those of Rachmaninoff, Mozart, Chopin, Debussy, and Brazilian composer Heitor Villa-Lobos, in concerts in Brazil, Europe, and the United States. She chaired the piano department at the Hochschule für Musik und Theater Hamburg, Germany, from 1972 to 1992.

== Early life ==
Bernette Epstein was born in Boston, Massachusetts, to Russian-Jewish immigrants Morris Epstein and his wife Dorothy Mandelbaum Epstein. When she was six months old, her family moved to São Paulo, Brazil, where she grew up and lived most of her life. She attended the Ginásio Oswaldo Cruz, graduating in 1937.

She began studying piano at the age of six under her uncle, José Kliass, a leading piano teacher in Brazil who was the student of German concert pianist Martin Krause. Kliass continued as her sole instructor for 20 years. Bernette performed for the first time at age eleven in a children's concert at São Paulo's Theatro Municipal, being the youngest pianist ever to perform in a government-sponsored music festival.

== Music career ==
She made her professional musical debut in 1938 with the São Paulo Municipal Symphony Orchestra. In 1942, with the encouragement of Polish-American classical pianist Arthur Rubinstein and Chilean pianist Claudio Arrau, she made her United States debut at New York's Town Hall. Reviews such as these were forthcoming for the blonde-haired performer:

Yara Bernette, twenty-two year old Brazilian pianist, captured the hearts of music lovers during her recent concert at Town Hall. Proclaimed a typical "glamour girl", one reviewer said, however, that it took "only a few brilliant rounds of the classics to realize the girl wasn't making history because of her looks".

Her first American concert tour also saw her perform in Canada, Puerto Rico, Guatemala, Venezuela, Columbia, and Argentina. In the late 1940s she gave an annual concert at Carnegie Hall. She dubbed the piano playing of actress Tônia Carrero in the 1952 Brazilian film Appassionata.

Though American-born, Bernette relinquished her U.S. citizenship in order to perform internationally under the Brazilian flag. In 1955 she made her European debut, performing in Paris with the Orchestre de la Société des Concerts du Conservatoire conducted by Heitor Villa-Lobos; she also played in Vienna, Amsterdam and London. Between 1957 and 1970 she returned to Europe for recitals and concerts, including solo performances with the Berlin Philharmonic and Philharmoniker Hamburg. She also played in the Far East. In 1961 she represented Brazil in the Second Inter-American Music Festival in Washington, playing "Variations on a Theme from the Northeast of Brazil for Piano and Orchestra" by Brazilian composer Camargo Guarnieri with the Rochester Symphony Orchestra. Guarnieri said in an interview that Bernette's interpretation of his work was "of the first order" and was true to his intentions. Bernette appeared as a soloist in the New York Philharmonic's 1965 season.

Bernette was considered one of Brazil's foremost pianists of the twentieth century. She had a chair in the Brazilian Academy of Music and was a member of the American Guild of Musical Artists.

== Teaching ==
In 1972 Bernette won the position of chair of the piano department at the Hochschule für Musik und Theater Hamburg over a field of 130 candidates. She taught at the school for 20 years. Afterwards she continued to teach in Brazil.

== Later years ==
In her later years, Bernette served as a juror for U.S. competitions such as the Van Cliburn International Piano Competition.

In 1995, upon the occasion of her 75th birthday, she was feted with a recital in Hamburg by her former Hochschule students, and she recorded "Portrait" for broadcast on German television. In 1996 a concert commemorating her six-decade career was held in Santa Catarina, with Bernette playing works by Haydn, Beethoven, Chopin, and Schumann.

== Awards ==
During her first European tour in 1955, Bernette was awarded the Arnold Bax Memorial Award in London as "Best Musical Interpreter of the Year".

== Personal life ==
She married Carlos da Silva Prado, with whom she had two sons. They divorced in 1949. In 1951 she sat for a portrait painting by Flávio del Carvalho, which is housed in the Museum of Brazilian Art.

She died of a heart attack on March 30, 2002, in São Paulo, aged 82.

== Repertoire and recordings ==
In 1970 she recorded her first disc comprising two sets of Preludes by Rachmaninoff, op. 23 and op. 32, for Deutsche Grammophon, the latter "considered one of the most difficult works for piano".

In 1995, at age 75, she recorded a solo album featuring 19 short pieces that could be used as encores in recitals, among them works by Bach, Domenico Scarlatti, Domenico Paradies, Mozart, Beethoven, Chopin, Schumann, Brahms, Debussy, Rachmaninoff, and Heitor Villa-Lobos.

== Sources ==
- Martin, Percy Alvin; Hilton, Ronald, eds. (1948). Who's Who in Latin America: A Biographical Dictionary of Notable Living Men and Women of Latin America – Part 6: Brazil (3rd ed.). Stanford University Press.
- Stern, Lee, ed. (1951). Who Is Who in Music: A Complete Presentation of the Contemporary Musical Scene, with a Master Record Catalogue. Lee Stern Press.
