= Conservatório Dramático e Musical de São Paulo =

Defunct conservatory in São Paulo, Brazil

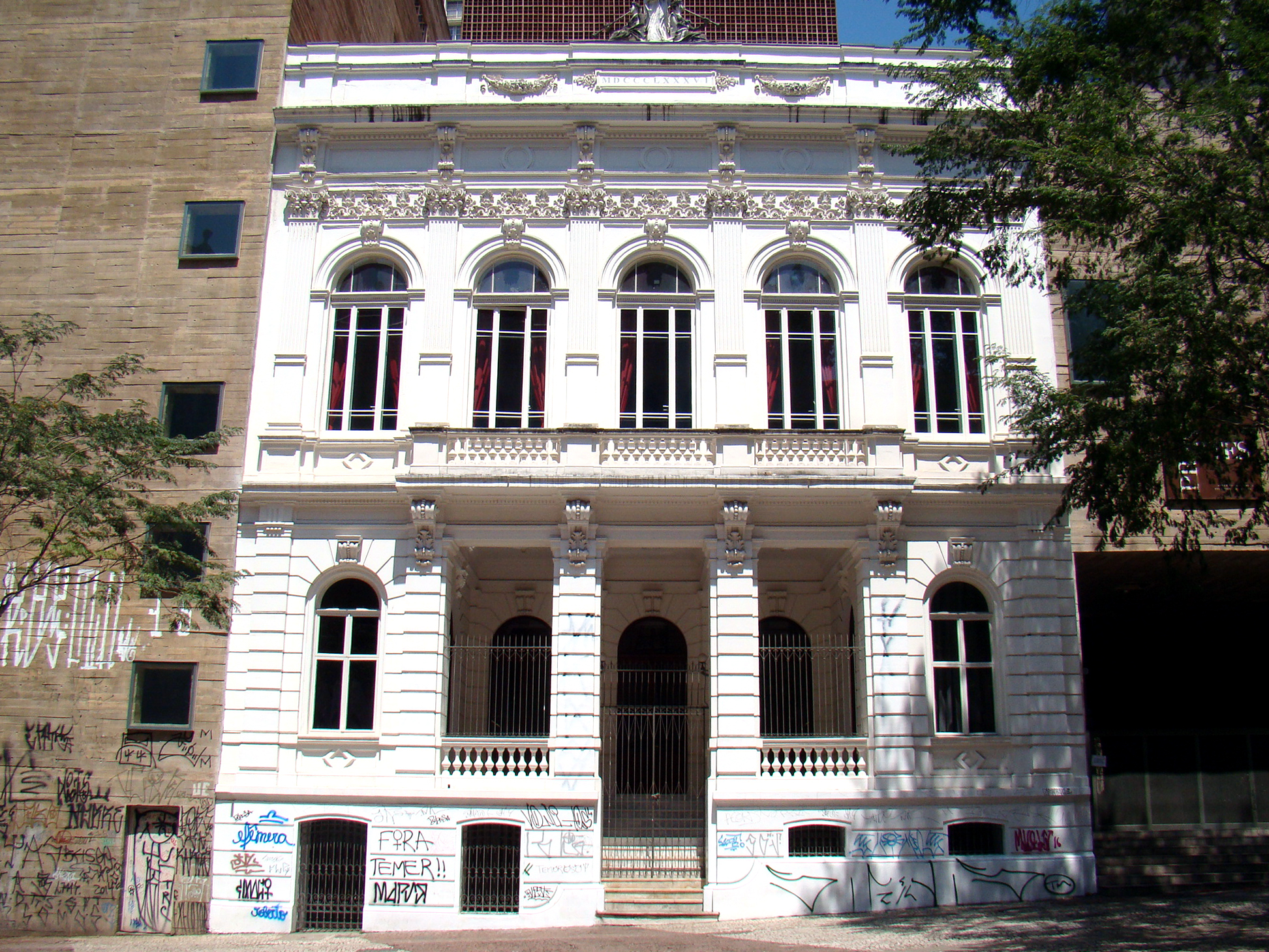
- Exterior of the conservatory building
- Type: Conservatory
- Active: February 15, 1906–2009
- Location: São Paulo, Brazil; 23.5444°S 46.6372°W
- Campus: Urban
- Website: Official website (2005 archive)
- Location within São Paulo Location within Brazil

The Conservatório Dramático e Musical de São Paulo (Musical and Dramatic Conservatory of São Paulo) was a conservatory and post-secondary school for students of music and dramaturgy in São Paulo, Brazil.

The Conservatory was founded on February 15, 1906, and inaugurated officially on March 12 of that year. It was the first school of its kind in the city of São Paulo and the fourth in Brazil, preceded by Conservatório de Música do Rio de Janeiro (1841), Conservatório Carlos Gomes (1895), and Instituto de Música da Bahia (1897).

One of many post-secondary music schools in São Paulo, the Conservatory was known chiefly for its library of musical and dramatic scholarship, and its most famous alumnus, poet and musicologist Mário de Andrade, who studied piano and taught there for much of his life. Composer Clorinda Rosato also studied at the Conservatory.

In 2009, due to many financial problems, the conservatory was closed. In 2012, the building was restored and integrated into the Praça das Artes. It is currently managed by the Fundação Theatro Municipal de São Paulo and houses the Sala do Conservatório, the headquarters of the String Quartet of the City of São Paulo.

== History ==
=== Cultural context ===
Between the 19th and 20th centuries, the theater scene in São Paulo was consolidated with the visit of tourists coming from Rio de Janeiro, the federal capital at the time, and from Europe. From the 1880s, renowned actors and actresses nationally and internationally such as Sarah Bernhardt, Gustavo Modena, Ernesto Rossi and Eleonora Duse arrived in the city and encouraged the organization of dramatic amateur societies. Several groups emerged, the most famous were the Filodramáticos. There were also others of various nationalities, such as Portuguese and Spanish. The Grêmio Dramático do Real Club Gymnastico Português was the group with the highest constant activity and duration. The context of cultural effervescence incentivized the creation of the Dramatic and Musical Conservatory of São Paulo, inspired by the Conservatoire de Paris.

=== Foundation and first headquarters ===
The initiative for the creation of a European-modeled conservatory was made by two enthusiasts of the time: the conductor and composer João Gomes de Araújo and the playwright and journalist Pedro Augusto Gomes Cardim, a member of the City Council of São Paulo.

On October 27 and 29, 1904, the Bill n. 43/1904, which would create the Conservatory, was proposed by a committee of 12 councilors headed by Pedro Augusto Gomes Cardim, to be subsidized by the City Hall. However, on December 29, 1904, Mayor Antônio da Silva Prado, at the request of the Finance Commission, recommended the rejection of the project on the following terms:

In conclusion, the foundation project of a Dramatic and Musical Conservatory, in charge of the Municipality, should not be converted into law:

1. Because it exceeds the competence of the City Council, in view of the Organic Law of Municipalities.

2. Because it burdens the municipal coffers with an expense incompatible with their resources, making it impossible to carry out the realization of the city's improvement plan, in the execution route.

The Bill n. 43/1904 was not approved and the Conservatory was founded only on February 15, 1906 as a private institution. A house was rented on Brigadeiro Tobias street in Bairro da República, São Paulo to host the activities of the conservatory.

The inauguration ceremony took place on March 12, 1906 and the call for sufficiency exams and enrollments for the courses was issued by the director secretary Pedro Augusto Gomes Cardim on April 2 and published in the São Paulo newspapers on the following days, while activities started on April 25 of the same year. The first board was composed of president, Antonio Lacerda de Franco, director-secretary, Pedro Augusto Gomes Cardim, and treasurer Carlos de Campos. Initially, 134 paying students and 48 who would take the courses for free were enrolled.

Inspired by European models, the course of dramaturgy was taught in the evening, from 6:00 PM to 9:00 PM. It lasted three years and covered subjects such as Portuguese, Italian, French, history, Brazilian choreography, poetics, psychology, diction, aesthetics, facial expression and gestures, recitation, clothing, collective representation, history of theater, fencing, among others. Foreign and Portuguese language classes were taught at the beginning for both courses, of dramatic art and music (which lasted five years). More specific subjects were addressed in the following years. In the course of dramatic art, the first teachers were Pedro Augusto Gomes Cardim, Venceslau de Queiroz (who taught Literature and Aesthetics), Luiz Pinheiro da Cunha, Hipólito da Silva (Diction) Augusto César Barjona (History of Theater) and Felipe Lorenzi (who was replaced in 1922 by Mário de Andrade).

=== Second and ultimate headquarters ===
With the need to sell the rented house, the founders sought a new headquarters for the school. The building on São João Avenue that would house the Dramatic and Musical Conservatory of São Paulo was built in 1896 by industrialist Frederico Joachim, representative of Rudolph Ibach Sohn pianos since 1891 and later of Steinway & Sons. The site, which was created to house the commercial establishment of Joachim, had on its ground floor the exhibition and sale of pianos and, on the first floor, the Steinway Hall. It was used to hold concerts of classical music and events for artistic purposes, such as literary meetings.

The Steinway Hall was renamed Carlos Gomes Hall, in honor of the late opera composer Carlos Gomes, and remained with this name until the building was sold to the conservatory in 1908. Although the concert hall was always kept active, in 1898 Frederico Joachim presents the project that would transform the building into a luxurious hotel, called Joachim's. Subsequently, the hotel is renamed Panorama and is sold to Councilman Luís Landró, until later it is passed on to the conservatory.

In 1908, with the help of the government, the board received 100 contos de réis and bought the building on Avenida São João for 160 contos de réis. In the new space, the conservatory gained prominence for its superior level of quality and became a reference of musical art in the city.

Some professors who made up the faculty of the conservatory were composers, such as Camargo Guarnieri and Fructuoso Vianna. Francisco Mignone and Mário de Andrade were students and subsequently became masters and taught at the institution.

Between 1910 and 1932, 411 students graduated. Among them, only 18 belonged to the course of dramatic art and 80% were graduating on piano, an instrument widely admired at the time.

According to Fausto Prado Penteado in 1922, “the Conservatory library contains 1,236 works, divided into 1,744 volumes, and another 648 musical pieces, making a total of 1,887 works”.

In the period of 1930 there was a decline in the amount of enrollment, a trend that followed in the coming years until it reached the crisis of the institution in 1940. In 1932 there were 1,211 students enrolled, a number that dropped in 1943 to 377. The reports of 1938 do not cite the course of dramatic art, which had possibly been suspended in the period.

Between 1942 and 1943, the federal government intervened in the school's administration, citing alleged irregularities. Carlos Augusto Gomes Cardim, Pedro Augusto Gomes Cardim's brother, was appointed as the interventor. With this measure, the drama course was reinstated. The change allowed new productions to take place, such as the productions Rosas de Todo o Ano, by Júlio Dantas; O Nefellibata, by Carlos Cardim; and Eis o Caso, by Dante Constantini. The school remained under federal intervention until the 1970s.

During the Second World War, the institution went into decay. The masters of the conservatory of German and Italian origin were removed by the government through the intervenor Carlos Augusto Gomes Cardim, appointed by Getúlio Vargas, who believed that teachers would be involved with fascism.

By the early 1950s, the teachers of the institution were very poorly paid and the building was already deteriorated. Camargo Guarnieri was rehired and elevated to the position of director in 1960, but quit because he could not cope with the excess bureaucracy and the plastered structure of the school. Difficulties such as the lack of resources, high tuition fees, the decline of the architectural heritage and delayed salaries were crucial to the weakening of the school's activities in subsequent years.

=== 1980s renovations ===
In the 1980s, the CDMSP building was completely deteriorated and an intervention was made to recover it. The Preliminary Study of Revitalization – Dramatic and Musical Conservatory São Paulo, 1980, carried out by the team of technicians of the Preservation Division of the Department of Historical Heritage of the Municipal Secretariat of Culture, determined the renovation of the building of Av. São João, restoring the main body, replacing the existing annexes with more suitable ones and interconnecting with the area of the Recanto Infantil Monteiro Lobato (which in 1984 was deactivated and became the Praça Monteiro Lobato).

The project was designed by EMURB with assistance from the Instituto de Pesquisas Tecnológicas. Among the renovations that were carried out, the annex of the conservatory that existed at the back of the building was demolished to build a new one with vertical circulation, classrooms, and the consolidation and reconstruction of the building's brick masonry. In the listed area, decorative paintings were made on the walls and ceiling of the ground floor hall. The sculptural ensemble of the parapet was cleaned and duly restored. Four floors were created to house a library with 12,000 volumes and hundreds of scores. An agreement between the CDMSP Foundation and the Municipal Secretariat of Culture, in addition to the contract with EMURB, was made to make the work feasible, which resulted in the new building with an area of 1,565 m² that now houses the music school. In 1984, however, restoration work on the main building, which had only just begun, was interrupted due to lack of funds.

=== Historical Heritage listing ===
In 1992 the building of the Dramatic and Musical Conservatory of São Paulo was listed as a Historical Heritage by the municipality through a resolution of CONPRESP. On November 25, 2000, the Council for the Defense of the Historical, Archaeological, Artistic and Tourist Heritage of the State of São Paulo (CONDEPHAAT), decided to open the process of study of the building's listing. The process was approved in 2014, and the justification was due to the significance in the cultural panorama of the city of São Paulo that the conservatory has since the 20th century, due to the relevance of the activities developed in the building, the architectural importance in the characteristics linked to the neoclassical style and the existence of the performance hall on the upper floor.

=== Construction of the Praça das Artes ===
In 2006, the year of the centenary of the institution, José Serra, then mayor of the city of São Paulo, determined the expropriation of the place for the construction of the cultural complex Praça das Artes. To this end, the administration of the municipality deposited 4 million reais in court by the building of the conservatory and 170,000 reais by the collection, which was donated to the Municipal Library Mário de Andrade and the Centro Cultural São Paulo.

Despite the deposit, the institution was unable to receive compensation, as it had to pay off almost R$700,000 in property tax and garbage collection fees. Without a certificate of no debts to access the money, the conservatory tried to appeal to the courts to annul the decrees, but lost to the city government and in 2008 the expropriation was completed. The institution began to operate in borrowed premises and with third-party instruments, in addition to no longer having its library collection, until it closed its activities in 2009.

The project of the Plaza de las Artes provided for the restoration of the main building of the conservatory, with the installation of the Municipal Theater Museum on the ground floor, intended for temporary exhibitions and events. In order to preserve aspects of the building, the authors of the project point out that, on the ground floor, for the construction of the Municipal Theater Museum, a careful work would be done that would restore columns and metal beams and beams and install air-conditioning, lighting and acoustics according to the Venice Charter, seeking minimal intervention. It was also defined that the concert hall on the upper floor would be restored and recovered in its original elements, but with the necessary addition of new thermo-acoustic solutions.

Construction work on the Praça das Artes began in May 2009 and its first phase was completed in 2012. The building at the back of the main conservatory building, built in the 1980 renovation, was demolished and a new vertical circulation tower was built in its place, with three elevators and fire safety stairs. This structure serves some buildings in the complex, providing access to the São Paulo Municipal School of Music, the São Paulo School of Dance, the administration of the Fundação Theatro Municipal de São Paulo, Spcine and the Documentation and Memory Center of the Municipal Theater. The complex is managed by the Fundação Theatro Municipal de São Paulo and has become the stage for various types of events, exhibitions and performances. The second phase of the project is currently under construction.

=== Sala do Conservatório ===
Since the inauguration of Praça das Artes, the building houses an Exhibition Hall on the ground floor dedicated to the exhibition of fine arts that are eventually displayed in the space or exhibitions of the historical collection of the Theatro Municipal de São Paulo.

The upper floor houses the Conservatory Room, the name that came to be used for the building of the former music school, which even received an identification plaque affixed to the facade of the building on Avenida São João.

With a capacity for 200 people, the concert hall is the official headquarters of the São Paulo City String Quartet and hosts chamber, contemporary, orchestral and choral music performances. The venue has been consolidating itself as an important concert hall in the city's music scene.
