= Isaías Sávio =

Uruguayan classical guitarist, composer, and music educator (1902–1977)

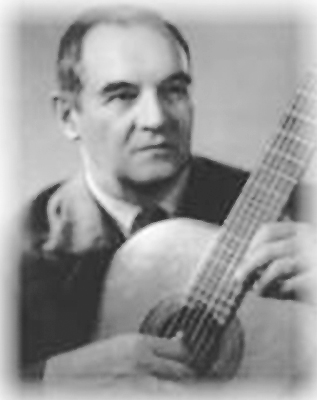
- Sávio in an undated photo
- Born: Isaías Sávio Burlo; 1 October 1902; Montevideo, Uruguay
- Died: 12 January 1977 (aged 74); São Paulo, Brazil
- Education: Conservatório Dramático e Musical de São Paulo
- Occupations: Guitarist; composer; music educator
- Style: Classical

Isaías Sávio Burlo (1 October 1902 (Note: His date of birth is also cited as 1 October 1900 by some sources.) – 12 January 1977, São Paulo) was a Uruguayan classical guitarist, composer, and music educator based in Brazil.

== Early life and education ==
Sávio was born on 1 October 1902 in Montevideo, Uruguay, to Ángel Sávio and Rosa Burlo. He began studying the piano at age nine, and after four years, opted for the guitar. He first studied with Luis Alba, and then, from age 11, with Conrado Koch. In 1912, he befriended the Paraguayan guitarist Agustín Barrios, having attended a concert of his at the Solís Theatre in Montevideo.

== Career ==
Sávio became a successful recording artist and performed concerts throughout South America. On tour in 1918, he met Miguel Llobet, and three years later, Andrés Segovia, both of whom would influence his style. From 1924 to 1930, Sávio lived and worked in Argentina. In 1931, he settled in São Paulo, Brazil, where he continued his classical career, performing there and in Porto Alegre and Belo Horizonte. He soon would leave again, residing in Rio de Janeiro until 1940. It was in 1933 when Sávio took on Luiz Bonfá as a student, and later, Antonio Rebello, with whom he formed a notable guitar duo in 1938.

In the latter part of his life, he focused on teaching, serving as the first professor of guitar at the Conservatório Dramático e Musical de São Paulo (São Paulo Conservatory of Music and Drama), beginning in 1947, and as director at the Escola Violinistica José do Patrocinio.

In 1951, he helped to found the Cultural Guitar Association of São Paulo.

Among the students he taught were the conductor Antônio Manzione, composer Jônatas Batista Neto, Carlos Barbosa-Lima, Paulo Bellinati, Tadeu do Amaral, Marcos Diaz, Marco Pereira, Henrique Pinto, and Ben and Maria Lívia São Marcos. He was also a teacher of the guitarist and composer Luiz Bonfá and the singer, guitarist, and composer Toquinho.

Also a composer, Sávio had over 100 pieces published, often taking inspiration from Brazilian folk melodies that he learned while traveling the country. He made contributions to Vladimir Bobri's A Musical Voyage with Two Guitars: 64 Duets from 34 Countries (1974).

== Legacy ==
The Brazilian pianist and composer Francisco Mignone, in partnership with Carlos Barbosa-Lima, wrote important works for guitar, including his Twelve Brazilian Waltzes, which he dedicated to Sávio.

== Compositions ==
- A Casinha Pequenina and Minha Terra Tem Palmeiras (Ricordi BR 150)
- Cajita de Música (Ricordi BA 11505)
- Cenas Brasileiras, 1 series (seven pieces) (Ricordi BR 1593)
- 2nd series (two pieces) (MCM 0271)
- Celeste y Blanco: Estilo (Ricordi BR 2301)
- Duas Guitarras: Canção Cignana (Ricordi BR 1811)
- Nesta Rua: Theme & Variations (Ricordi BR 2252)
- Ojos Negros (Dark Eyes – Russian song) & A Casinha Pequenina (Ricordi BA 11217)
- Para Nilo Brincar: 9 popular children's song (Ricordi BR 1079)
- Pensamientos, Op. 3 (short works) (Romero y Fernandez)
- Pequeña Romanza (Romero y Fernandez 7448)
- Preludes Nos. 3, 4, 5, 6 (Ricordi BR 3193)
- Four Preludes Pitorescos (Ricordi BR 1808)
- Sarabande & Gigue (Ricordi BR 2170)
- Three Original Pieces, 1927 (Ricordi BR 3076)
- Vidalita Popular & Dança de Boneca (Ricordi BR 2337)
- Variações de Gato (Ricordi BR 2302)
- Variations on an Infant's Theme (Romero y Fernandez)
- 25 Melodic Studies (GSP 113)

== Selected discography ==
- Yone Perreira Interpreta Isaias Sávio (Brasidisc LP 14037)
