= São Paulo Municipal Symphony Orchestra =

Artistic ensemble of São Paulo, Brazil

- Orchestra
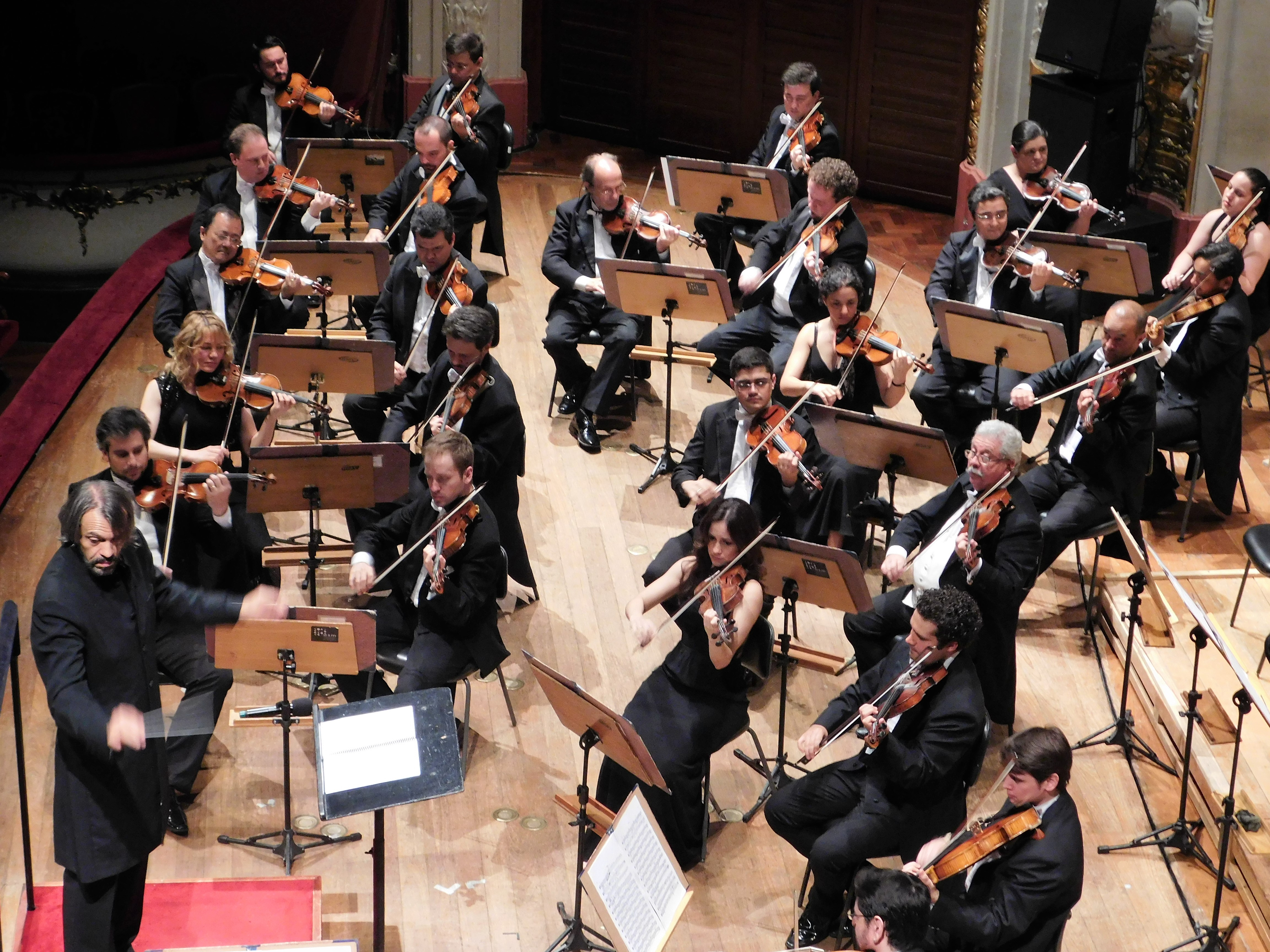
- Performance by the Municipal Orchestra
- Native name: Orquestra Sinfônica Municipal de São Paulo
- Short name: OSM
- Founded: 1939; 86 years ago
- Location: São Paulo, São Paulo; Brazil
- Principal conductor: Roberto Minczuk
- Website: https://theatromunicipal.org.br/pt-br/orquestrasinfonicamunicipal/

The São Paulo Municipal Symphony Orchestra (Portuguese: Orquestra Sinfônica Municipal de São Paulo), also known as OSM, is one of the artistic bodies of the Municipal Theater of São Paulo. Currently under the direction of Roberto Minczuk, it performs in operas and concerts, often with guest soloists and other artistic ensembles such as the São Paulo Municipal Lyric Choir and the São Paulo City Ballet.

== History ==
Until the beginning of the 20th century, the operas performed at the Municipal Theater of São Paulo were entirely foreign productions, since the venue didn't have enough instrumentalists and choirs to produce its own shows. The orchestras that were active in São Paulo during this period, although frequent, were not permanent, being organized by event and dispersing at the end of them. Based on reports by conductor Armando Belardi, the origin of the orchestra is attributed to the Sociedade de Concertos Clássicos de São Paulo.

The first permanent ensemble of musicians with a concert season was established in 1935 through a partnership between the Department of Culture and the Sociedade de Cultura Artística. The suggestion was made by Secretary of Culture Mário de Andrade to utilize an orchestra that had been contracted for seasons by the society since 1933. The group's first conductor was the German Ernst Melich, who had already worked with the orchestra of the Sociedade de Cultura Artística. Soon it began to function regularly, hosting concerts and being informally called the Department of Culture Orchestra, but still without legal stability or the hiring of permanent musicians. Each concert season required specific funding, with performers recruited and paid according to the occasion.

From 1936 onwards, the orchestra was also linked to the Municipal Theater and often called the Municipal Theater Symphony Orchestra. The most active conductors in these early years were Camargo Guarnieri, Sousa Lima and Armando Belardi. In 1939, the orchestra was formalized during the administration of then mayor Francisco Prestes Maia, reorganized by Armando Belardi and officially named the São Paulo Municipal Theater Orchestra, as it became known for the next ten years. Law No. 3,829, of December 28, 1949, legally created and renamed the São Paulo Municipal Symphony Orchestra, and in early 1950 it held its first public competition to hire musicians, who for the first time had functional stability.

Francisco Mignone, Almeida Prado, Villa-Lobos, Penderecki and Camargo Guarnieri have conducted the group as guest musicians. Eleazar de Carvalho, Isaac Karabtchevsky, Sergio Magnani and Jamil Maluf have also played with the group, as well as soloists such as Magdalena Tagliaferro and Guiomar Novaes. Since its creation, the orchestra has also been conducted by Arturo de Angelis, Zaccaria Autuori, Edoardo de Guarnieri, Lion Kasniefski, Souza Lima, Eleazar de Carvalho, Armando Belardi, David Machado, Ira Levin, José Maria Florêncio, Alex Klein, Abel Rocha and John Neschling. Its current principal conductor is Roberto Minczuk. On September 1, 2018, the OSM was called "the best orchestra in our country" by Maestro João Carlos Martins.

== See also ==
- São Paulo State Symphony Orchestra
- Praça das Artes
