= Praça das Artes =

Cultural complex in São Paulo, Brazil

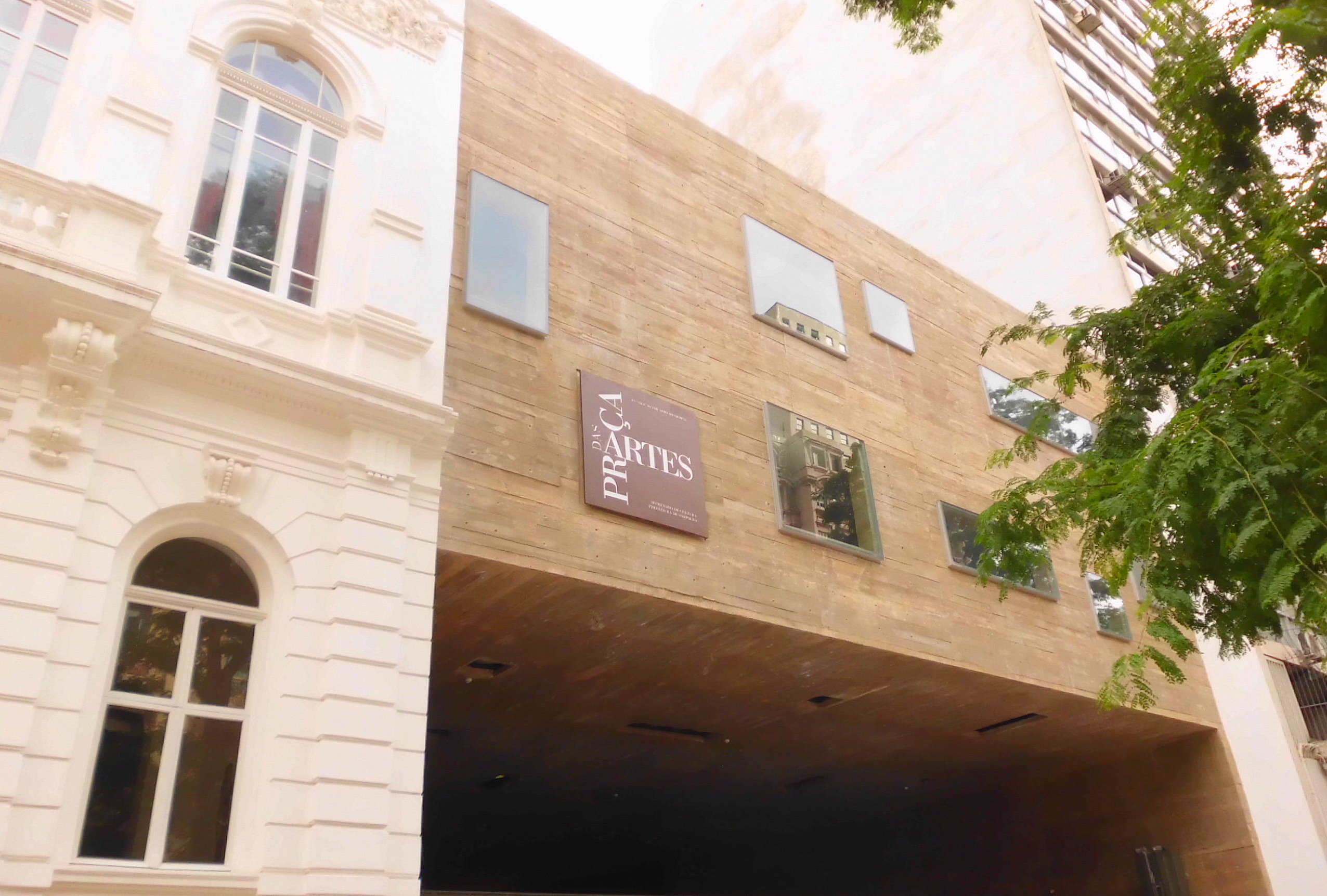
- View from one of the entrances to the cultural complex on Avenida São João.

General information
- Architectural style: Contemporary architecture
- Location: São Paulo, São Paulo; Brazil
- Inaugurated: December 5, 2012; 12 years ago
- Owner: São Paulo Municipal Theater Foundation

Technical details
- Floor area: 28.500m²

Design and construction
- Architect(s): Marcos Cartum; Marcelo Ferraz; Francisco Fanucci
- Awards and prizes: Best Work of Architecture 2012 - São Paulo Association of Art Critics; Building of the Year 2013 - Icon Awards; Impressive Projects of the Americas (2014 finalist) - Mies Crown Hall Americas Prize

Website
- https://theatromunicipal.org.br/pt-br/praca-das-artes/

Praça das Artes is a Brazilian cultural complex located in the city of São Paulo that promotes performances and exhibitions related to music, dance, theater and visual arts. Inaugurated in 2012, it functions as an extension of the activities of the São Paulo Municipal Theater, as well as being home to the São Paulo Dance School, the São Paulo Municipal Music School, the Conservatory Hall and the Municipal Theater's artistic groups.

Currently managed by the São Paulo Municipal Theater Foundation, Praça das Artes is one of the largest cultural complexes in Latin America with an area of 28,500 m^{2} (307,000 sq ft). Its construction has become an urban intervention for the requalification of the central area and a landmark in São Paulo's architecture.

== Historical context ==
Until the beginning of the 20th century, the São Paulo Municipal Theater did not have its own choirs and instrumentalists to perform in its opera. Originally, the venue was built to meet the wishes of the local elite at the time, who wanted the city to be on par with the great cultural centers of the world. As such, the Municipal Theater was conceived as a simple receiver of foreign companies, especially from Europe.

In 1920, in view of the theater's demand to have its own musicians and dancers to produce its shows, the São Paulo Municipal Symphony Orchestra was created, which began to perform concerts sporadically without being officially linked to the theater. A few years later, the String Quartet, the Mário de Andrade Choir and the Municipal Lyric Choir were founded. Afterwards, the São Paulo Dance School, the São Paulo City Ballet, the São Paulo Municipal Music School and the Experimental Repertory Orchestra also emerged.

All the artistic groups linked to the Municipal Theater struggled with the lack of space backstage and in the rehearsal rooms, as the building was not designed with enough infrastructure to accommodate all the companies that were created over the course of its history. Similarly, dance and music schools also lacked adequate facilities for their activities, especially as they grew over the years and began to cater for more students.

For many decades, without a suitable venue for their rehearsals, the Municipal Theater's artistic groups occupied different spaces in the city center. In order to bring together all the artistic groups and training schools in a single location with adequate infrastructure, the Praça das Artes was created.

== Architectural project and inauguration ==
=== First phase (2006–2012) ===
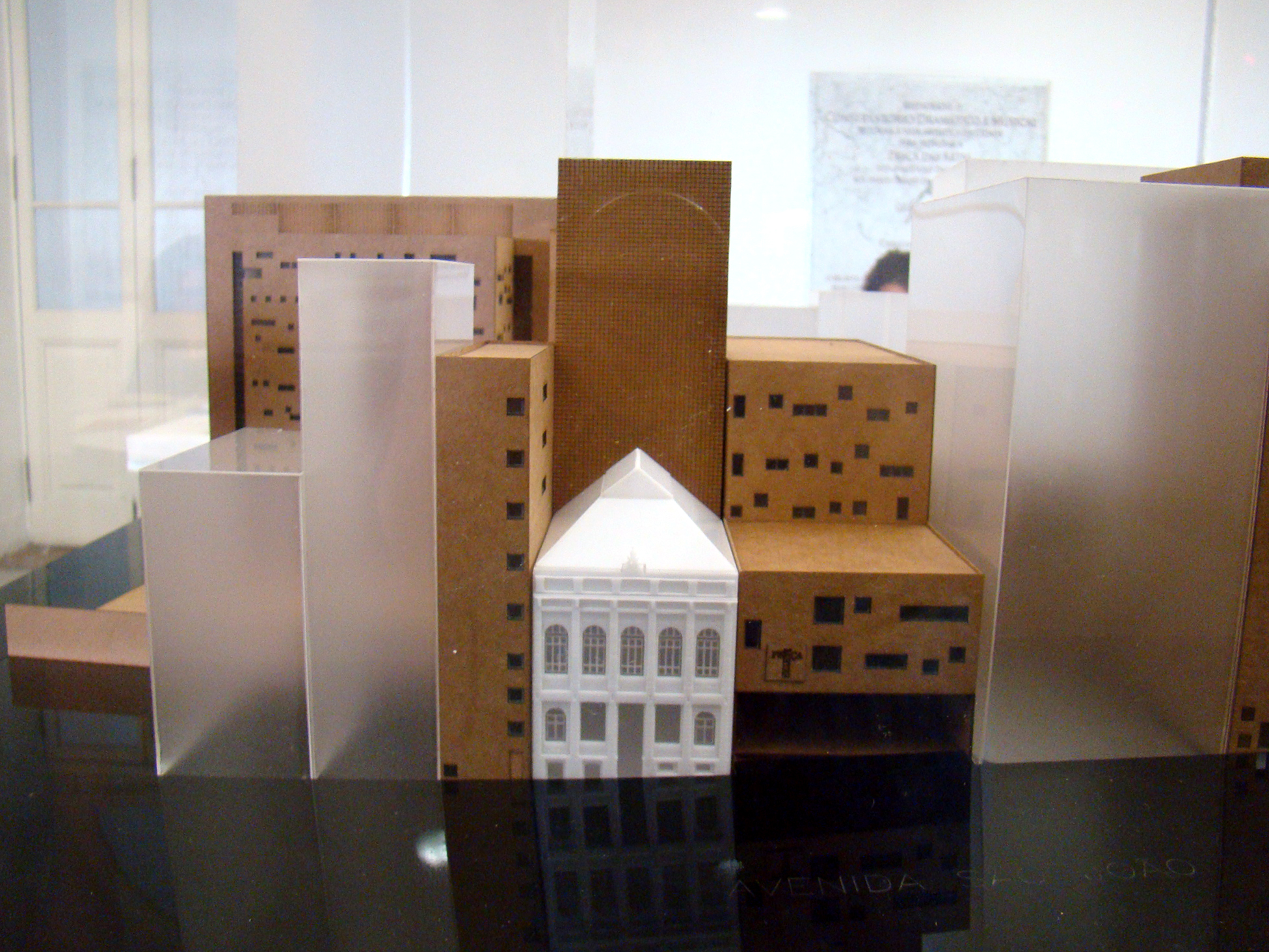
Model of the Praça das Artes, built around the São Paulo Conservatory of Drama and Music, shown in white.

The architectural project for the cultural complex aimed to create a space surrounding the São Paulo Conservatory of Drama and Music, creating a mixed form of building and square, with access from Avenida São João, Anhangabaú Valley and Conselheiro Crispiniano Street. Started in 2006, the project intended to set up music and dance teaching rooms, auditoriums and spacious facilities to house professionals, in order to accommodate around 2,000 people, including artists, students, teachers, technicians and administrators.

Designed by architects Marcos Cartum, Marcelo Ferraz and Francisco Fanucci, the cultural complex established itself as an urban redevelopment intervention in the central area of São Paulo. Several damaged buildings were expropriated for its construction, including the conservatory, which was restored and incorporated into the complex's design. The Cairo and Saci cinemas were also expropriated, but the first had its facade preserved.

Occupying an area of 28,500 m^{2} (307,000 sq ft), construction on Praça das Artes began in 2009 and the first module was inaugurated on December 5, 2012. The São Paulo Dance School, which for 70 years was located under the Viaduto do Chá, moved to the cultural complex in 2013. Similarly, the São Paulo Municipal Music School left its old premises on Vergueiro Street to occupy the second and third floors of the Praça das Artes. The Experimental Repertory Orchestra, which used to rehearse at Galeria Olido, also began using the music school's facilities, while the São Paulo City String Quartet was given its own headquarters and occupied the premises formerly used by the now-defunct São Paulo Conservatory of Drama and Music.

=== Second phase (2019) ===
The second phase of the complex, inaugurated on March 23, 2019, involved the partial conclusion of the artistic groups building with the delivery of seven floors, leaving four to be completed. Once fully finished, the São Paulo Municipal Symphony Orchestra, the São Paulo Municipal Lyric Choir, the São Paulo City Ballet and the Mário de Andrade Choir were housed in the building.

The second phase also included the inauguration of an internal square opening onto the Anhangabaú Valley, a garden and an outdoor bar. The Monument to Giuseppi Verdi was supposed to be restored and brought from the other side of the Anhangabaú Valley to adorn the complex's square, but the idea has yet to come to fruition. There is also a project to expand the cultural complex, increasing the area set aside for training schools and building an auditorium and disco.

=== Impacts and awards ===
The Praça das Artes project aimed to solve the problem of lack of space in the backstage and rehearsal rooms of the São Paulo Municipal Theater. The work became a landmark in the architecture of the city of São Paulo and received the award for Best Work of Architecture in 2012 from the São Paulo Association of Art Critics, the Building of the Year award in 2013 from the Icon Awards, held by Icon Magazine, and in 2014 it was a finalist for the Impressive Projects of the Americas from the Mies Crown Hall Americas Prize.

== Artistic groups and institutions ==
Praça das Artes is home to the following artistic groups, venues and cultural institutions:

- São Paulo Municipal Theater Foundation;
- São Paulo Municipal Symphony Orchestra;
- São Paulo Municipal Lyric Choir;
- São Paulo City Ballet;
- São Paulo Mário de Andrade Choir;
- Experimental Repertory Orchestra;
- São Paulo City String Quartet;
- São Paulo Conservatory of Drama and Music;
- São Paulo Dance School;
- São Paulo Municipal Music School;
- São Paulo Municipal Theater Documentation and Memory Center;
- Spcine.

== See also ==
- Tourism in the city of São Paulo
- Historic Center of São Paulo
