= Roberto Szidon =

Brazilian pianist

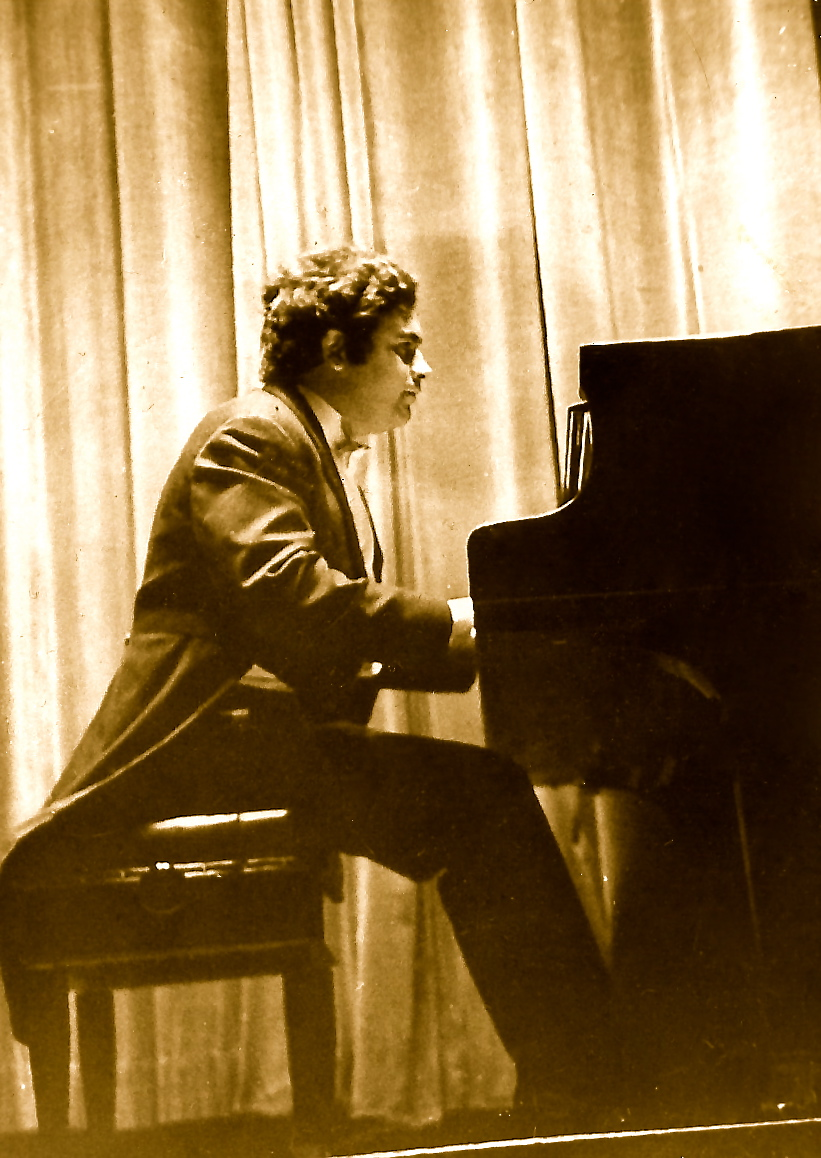

Background information
- Born: September 21, 1941; Porto Alegre, Brazil
- Died: December 21, 2011 (aged 70) Düsseldorf, Germany
- Occupations: musician, teacher, scholar, pianist
- Instrument: piano
- Label: Deutsche Grammophon
- Partner: Richard Metzler

Roberto Szidon (21 September 1941 – 21 December 2011) was a Brazilian classical pianist who had an international performing and recording career, and settled in Germany.

== Life and career ==
Szidon was born in Porto Alegre, Brazil in 1941. He gave his first concert at age 9 in his home town. He then studied composition with Karl Faust, and continued his pianistic studies in the United States with Ilona Kabos and Claudio Arrau.

Szidon played with many renowned orchestras. In 1977, he completed a Southern Africa tour. He was the soloist at the premiere of Camargo Guarnieri's Piano Concerto No. 4, in Porto Alegre, on 6 September 1972.

As a recording artist, Szidon was best known for his complete recording of the 10 Piano Sonatas and the Fantaisie in B minor by Alexander Scriabin and his complete recording of the 19 Hungarian Rhapsodies and the Rhapsodie espagnole by Franz Liszt.

Szidon recorded a prize-winning LP in 1965 of Heitor Villa-Lobos's Rudepoêma. Other Villa-Lobos works in his discography were A fiandeira, Saudades dos selvas brasileiras, New York Skyline (1957 version), Carnaval dos crianças, A lenda do caboclo, Suite floral, Op. 97 (1949 revision), and 16 Cirandas and 12 Cirandinhas. He also recorded the works of other Brazilian composers such as Ernesto Nazareth, Francisco Mignone and Chiquinha Gonzaga.

Szidon also recorded Frédéric Chopin's 4 Scherzos and 4 Impromptus (Deutsche Grammophon LP 536 378), Sergei Rachmaninoff's 2nd Sonata, Sergei Prokofiev's 6th Sonata, as well as Charles Ives's "Concord Sonata", Edward MacDowell's Second Concerto and Gershwin's Concerto in F.

He frequently performed and recorded chamber music with violinist Jenny Abel, and recorded with Thomas Quasthoff Schumann's Dichterliebe, Liederkreis, Op. 39, and other songs. He taught piano at the music academies in Hannover and Düsseldorf, where he was a professor of piano until his death.

Szidon died in December 2011, in Düsseldorf, Germany, of a heart attack, aged 70.
