= Sonata for guitar (Ginastera) =

The Sonata for guitar, Op. 47 is a composition by Alberto Ginastera. This sonata was written in 1976 for the guitarist Carlos Barbosa-Lima (Basinski 1994, 10, 47n71). The composer subsequently revised the work twice: first in 1977–78, then again in 1981 (Schwartz-Kates 2001). It is the only original composition for guitar by Ginastera.

== Discography ==
In chronological order of recording.

- Heitor Villa-Lobos: 5 Preludes; 12 Études; Alberto Ginastera: Sonata. Eduardo Fernández, guitar. CD recording, 1 sound disc: digital, stereo, 4¾ in. Decca 414616-2; issued also on cassette, Decca 414616-4. London: Decca Record Co., 1987.
- Sonatas para guitarra. Oscar Esplá: Tempo di sonata; Leo Brouwer: Sonata; William Bardwell: Sonata; Alberto Ginastera: Sonata, Op. 47. Ignacio Rodés, guitar. CD recording, 1 sound disc: digital, stereo, 4¾ in. Opera Tres CD1010-OPE; Opera Tres M-28552-1993. Madrid: Opera Tres, 1993.
- Piano and Guitar. Alberto Ginastera: Sonata No. 1 for Piano, Op. 22 (1952); Leo Brouwer: Tres danzas concertantes (1958/59); Manuel Maria Ponce: Sonata for Guitar and Piano (1931); Alberto Ginastera: Sonata for Guitar, Op. 47 (1976). Franz Halász, guitar; Debora Halász, piano. Recorded 1994, Musikhochschule Dortmund. CD recording 1 disc: digital, stereo, 4¾ in. BIS-CD-671. Djursholm: Grammofon AB BIS, 1994.
- Alberto Ginastera: Cantos del Tucmán; "Danza del trigo" and "Triste pampeano" (from Estancia); Guitar Sonata, Op. 47; Puneña No. 2 for solo cello, Op. 45; Duo for flute and oboe, Op. 13; Danza criolla, Op. 15, No. 1; Milonga; Impresiones de la puna. Olivia Blackburn, soprano; Anna Noakes, flute; David Emanuel and Rafael Gintoli, violins; Gillian Tingay, harp; Gary Kettel, percussion; John Anderson, oboe; Christopher van Kampen, cello; Mariá Isabel Siewers, guitar; Lyric String Quartet. Recorded 1995, Kentish Town, St. Silas Church, and 2000, Weston, Holy Trinity Church. Series: Ginastera Vol. 5. CD recording, 1 disc: digital, stereo, 4¾ in. ASV CD DCA 1103. London: ASV, 2001.
- Johannes Tonio Kreusch Plays Villa-Lobos and Ginastera. Heitor Villa-Lobos: Etudes pour la guitarra (Paris 1928–29, manuscript version); Alberto Ginastera: Sonata for Guitar, op. 47 (Geneva 1976, manuscript version). Johannes Tonio Kreusch, guitar. Recorded 2002. CD recording 1 disc: digital, stereo, 4¾ in. Oehms Classics OC 241. [Dittingheim]: Musikproduktion Dieter Oehms, 2003.
- Souvenirs. David Zipperle: Südtiroler Variationen, Nächster Halt: Basel, Sonata zingara, Lovesong; Johann Kaspar Mertz: Fantaisie hongroise, Op. 65; Peter Ratzenbeck: Odyssee; Ossy Pardeller: Rio molino; Alberto Ginastera: Sonata, Op. 47; Manuel M. Ponce: Preludio VI "Souvenir surprise". David Zipperle, guitar. Recorded 2005, Freiburg, Studio TeFau. CD recording 1 disc: digital, stereo, 4¾ in. Dematon DT-05321. Lübeck: Dematon Musikproduktionen, 2005.
- Esordio. Johann Sebastian Bach: Suite in E minor, for lute BWV 9969 (arr. guitar); Leo Brouwer: Berceuse, Cancion de cuna, Étude No. 14, Étude No. 17; Johann Kaspar Mertz: Liebeslied; Francisco Tárrega: Capriccho arabe; Heitor Villa-Lobos: Prelude No. 1, Homage to the Brazilian Country Dweller, Mazurka-chôro, Prelude No. 5, Homage to Social Life, and Chôro No. 1; Alberto Ginastera: Sonata for Guitar, Op. 47. David Patterson, guitar. Recorded at WGBH Studios, Boston, Mass. CD recording, 1 sound disc: digital, stereo, 4¾ in. T4Dragons T4D 005-01. [S.l.]: T4Dragons, 2005.
- Guitar Recital. Matthew Dunne: Appalachian Summer; Jacques Hétu: Suite, Op. 41; Juan Manén: Fantasie-sonata, Op. A22; Joaquín Rodrigo: Tres piezas españolas; Alberto Ginastera: Sonata, Op. 47; Manuel de Falla: Homenaje (Pour Le Tombeau de Claude Debussy). Jérôme Ducharme, guitar. Recorded 16–19 March 2006, St. John Chrysostom Church, Newmarket, Ontario, Canada. CD recording, 1 sound disc: digital, stereo, 4 3/4 in. Naxos 8.570189. Laureate Series: Guitar. "First prize: 2005 Guitar Foundation of America Guitar Competition." [Hong Kong]: Naxos, 2006.
- Chitarra giocosa. Joaquin Rodrigo: Sonata giocosa; Antonio José: Sonata; Alberto Ginastera: Sonata, Op. 47; Jerzy Bauer: Concerto for guitar and chamber orchestra. Marcin Dylla, guitar. Recorded July 2005 in Germany. CD recording, 1 sound disc: digital, stereo, 4¾ in. Fleur de Son Classics FDS 57979. Buffalo, N.Y.: Fleur de Son Classics, 2006.
- Carlos Barbosa-Lima, guitar Concord CCD-42015
- Simmetrie e Contrasti nel Novecento, Lennox Berkeley: Quatres Pieces pour la guitare; Frank Martin: Quatres Pièces breves; A. José: Sonata; Alberto Ginastera: Sonata. Simone Rinaldo, guitar. Recorded November 2017. DotGuitar, Winner Series.

== Bibliography ==
- Mark Grover Basinski: "Alberto Ginastera's Use of Argentine Folk Elements in the Sonata for Guitar, Op. 47". DMA document, University of Arizona, 1994. UMI No. DA9426333 (Archive from 25 March 2012, accessed 5 May 2018).
- Deborah Schwartz-Kates: "Ginastera, Alberto (Evaristo)". The New Grove Dictionary of Music and Musicians, second edition, edited by Stanley Sadie and John Tyrrell. London: Macmillan Publishers, 2001.
