= Carlos Barbosa-Lima =

Brazilian classical and jazz guitarist (1944–2022)

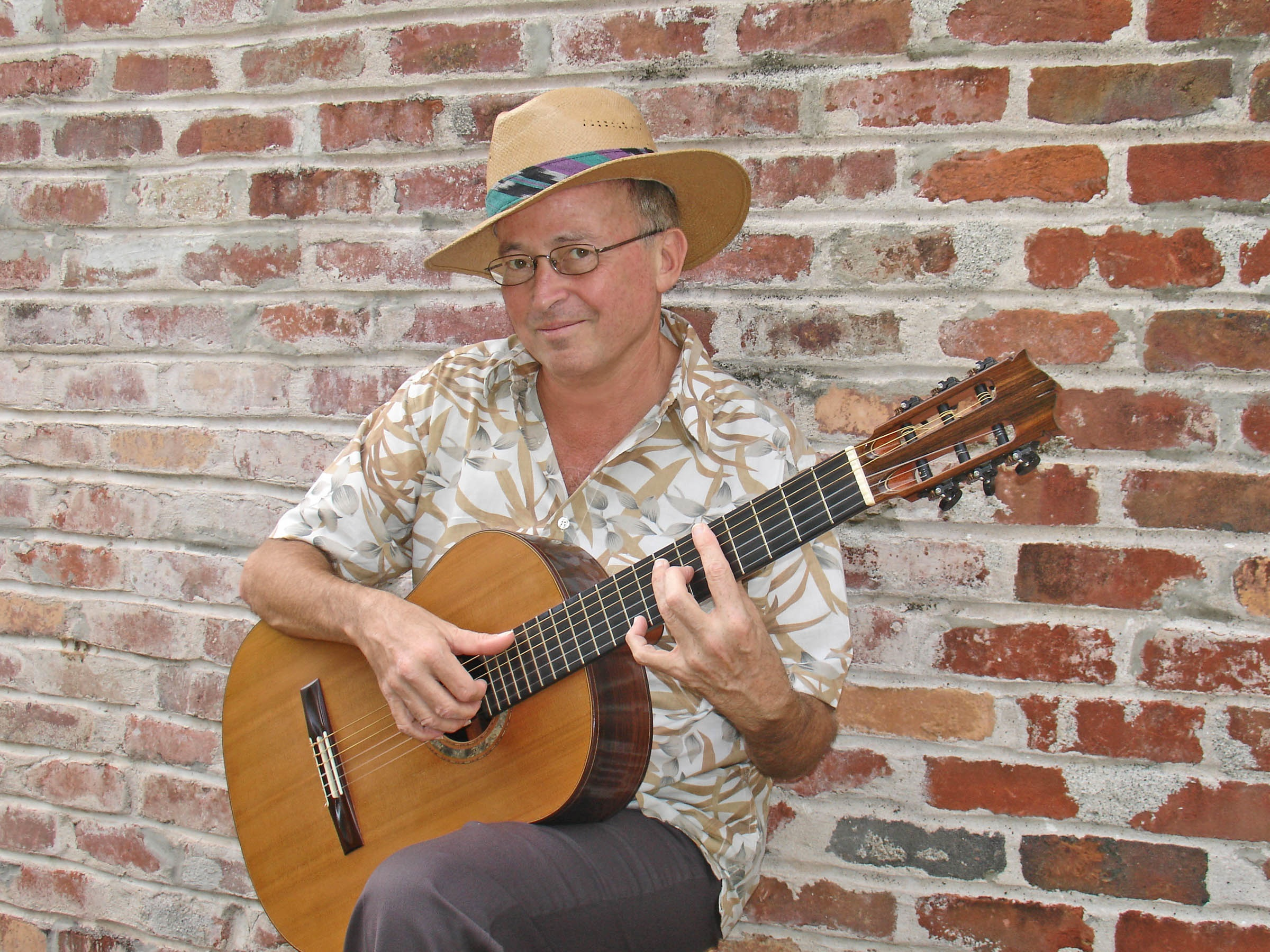
- Barbosa-Lima in 2009

Background information
- Born: Antonio Carlos Ribeiro Barbosa Lima; 17 December 1944; São Paulo, Brazil
- Died: 23 February 2022 (aged 77) Paraty, Brazil
- Genres: Classical, jazz, Brazilian
- Occupations: Musician, arranger
- Instrument: Guitar
- Years active: 1958–2022
- Labels: Concord Jazz, Zoho Music

Antonio Carlos Ribeiro Barbosa Lima (17 December 1944 – 23 February 2022) was a Brazilian classical and jazz guitarist. He spent most of his professional life as a resident in the United States, devoting much of his time as a recitalist on international concert tours. He appeared often as a soloist and with orchestras.

== Early life ==
Born to Manuel Carlos and Eclair Soares Ribeiro Barbosa-Lima on 17 December 1944 in São Paulo, Brazil, Barbosa-Lima grew up in the Brooklyn district of the city. He stated that he began playing guitar when he was seven.

Barbosa-Lima recalled that his father, Manuel Carlos, hired an instructor to teach him how to play guitar. The lessons were then transferred from the father to the son, and the child became known in the neighborhood as a prodigy. After two years of lessons with Benedito Moreira, the young man was introduced to Brazilian guitarist composer Luiz Bonfá. Under the recommendation of Bonfa, Barbosa-Lima was directed to Isaías Sávio, the father of the classical guitar school of Brasil. At the behest of family, friends, and acquaintances, he made his concert debut in Sao Paulo in November 1957 when he was twelve years old. During the next year, he performed on a television variety show that introduced young musicians and gave a solo concert in Rio de Janeiro. He signed a contract with Chantecler, which was part of RCA Brazil, and in June 1958 he released his first album, Dez Dedos Magicos Num Violão De Ouro.

In 1960 Barbosa-Lima began the life of a traveling musician, touring in Montevideo, Uruguay, and eastern Brazil. He made his American debut in Washington, D.C, in 1967. He toured through the U.S. and Central and South America. Barbosa-Lima was now making his own arrangements for guitar. In 1964 he released an album of arrangements by the popular Brazilian songwriter, Catullo. Friends of Barbosa-Lima heard these arrangements and encouraged him to continue arranging for guitar.

== Professional life ==
In 1967 Barbosa-Lima gave his New York debut at Weill Recital Hall at Carnegie Hall (then known as Carnegie Recital Hall). This concert was met once again with excellent reviews and moved his career onto the global concert stage. In 1968 he went to Madrid to play for Andrés Segovia. After returning two years later, he gave a concert in New York's Town Hall. At the conclusion of this concert he was approached by Harold Shaw and Shaw Concerts who offered him a steady stream of concert dates within the United States. With the heavy concert schedule and Master classes now available to him through Shaw Concerts Barbosa-Lima took a teaching position at Carnegie Mellon University (1974–1978). It was during this time that Barbosa-Lima's reputation as a world class guitarist began to blossom and composers began writing works for him. One very important composer of this time was Alberto Ginastera who composed the Sonata for guitar, op. 47 for Barbosa-Lima. The later end of the decade (1977) saw Barbosa-Lima perform Francisco Mignone's Concerto for Guitar and Orchestra at the Kennedy Center in Washington, D.C.

As the 1980s began Barbosa-Lima moved to New York City (1981) and took a teaching post at the Manhattan School of Music. Once in New York Barbosa-Lima began to perform with Jazz guitarist Charlie Byrd. Upon hearing Barbosa-Lima's arrangements Mr. Byrd immediately arranged for Barbosa-Lima to meet and perform for Carl Jefferson (the owner of Concord records). Carl Jefferson signed Barbosa-Lima and eleven recordings were to follow on the Concord Jazz label. In 1982 Barbosa-Lima made frequent contact with fellow Brazilian, Antônio Carlos Jobim, one of the world's most popular composers of all time. Barbosa-Lima would often meet him at Jobim's upper east side apartment in New York City for impromptu jam sessions. It was out of these sessions that came the recording Carlos Barbosa-Lima plays Music by Antônio Carlos Jobim and George Gershwin a crossover CD before the word was popular. Jobim was immediately impressed with Barbosa-Lima's arranging technique for guitar which Barbosa-Lima describes as "multi-linear" basically meaning several voices moving at once like classical guitar technique. At the time of their meetings Jobim was more familiar with the Brazilian guitar technique which utilized a "block chord" technique as Jobim himself used. "...Barbosa-Lima brings an ear attuned to counterpoint and technique that gives each independent line its own voice. His transcriptions find and define every moving part, in bossa novas and countermelodies together as he does in Gershwin, he sounds like a team of guitarists". And in keeping with Barbosa-Lima's multi-linear technique the Cuban composer Leo Brouwer, who has long been a personal friend of his, has said; "...when unknowingly I [Brouwer] walked by a hotel room and heard guitar music I thought I was listening to a guitar duo and then suddenly recognized the music and realized it was Barbosa-Lima playing solo. If I weren't a guitar player and guitar composer who noticed a mistake by one of the violinists during a rehearsal of a seventy-member orchestra my confusion could be justified. I believe that Carlos Barbosa-Lima is a genius of transcriptions of Latin American music for guitar."

Barbosa-Lima later recorded for the Zoho music record label and released five recordings under this label and the direction of Barbosa-Lima's recordings as well as his concert programing have a definite Latin American concept. In April 2010 Barbosa-Lima celebrated the release of his fiftieth recording release, Merengue (Zoho Music, CD 200911) at Weill Recital Hall at Carnegie Hall. His last album “Delicado,” was released in 2019 and was a tribute to Brazilian music made with Del Casale and others.

== Personal life and death ==
Barbosa-Lima died from a heart attack in Paraty on 23 February 2022, at the age of 77.

== Recordings ==
Carlos Barbosa-Lima's style integrates classical, Latin, and jazz. His discography extends over forty releases and over fifty years.

Due to his first recording (age 13) having been made in 1958, when the recording industry had not yet gone digital, the initial recordings were all on analog media, primarily 45 rpm, 78 rpm, and LP disks, along with cassette tapes. A long-term relationship with Concord Records developed in 1982, and it began on analog media, taking the recording process into the digital age with CDs.

When Concord changed its focus, Barbosa-Lima developed a new partnership with the New York-based Zoho label in 2001 beginning with his recording Frenesi (Zoho 200408).

== Repertoire ==
- Music for Guitar and Orchestra
- Concierto de Aranjuez by Joaquin Rodrigo
- Fantasia para un gentilhombre by Joaquin Rodrigo
- Concierto Antillano by Ernesto Cordero
- Concierto del Sur by Manuel Ponce
- Concerto no.1 by Mario Castelnuovo-Tedesco
- Capricio Diabolico by Mario Castelnuovo-Tedesco
- Concertino no.1 by Guido Santorsola
- Concertino no.2 by Guido Santorsola
- Concerto by Heitor Villa-Lobos
- A Lenda do Caboclo (arr by ByronYasui) by Heitor Villa-Lobos
- Concerto by Francisco Mignone
- Concerto de Copacabana by Radanies Gnattali
- Piccola Arieta no.2 by Byron Yasui
- Rhapsody in Blue (arr by CBL) George Gershwin
- Concierto en modo frigio by Eduardo Grau
- Eloise and Abelard by Bobby Scott
- Clio by Bobby Scott
- From Yesterday to Penny Lane (arr Brouwer) by Paul McCartney/John Lennon
- Concertino da California by Albert Harris
- Suite Retratos by Radanes Gnattali
- Concerto (viola brasileira) by Theodoro Nogueira
- O Boto (arr by Byron Yasui) by Antonio Carlos Jobim
- Saudade do Brasil (arr Paulo Jobim) by Antonio Carlos Jobim
- Meu amigo Radames (arr Paulo Jobim) by Antonio Carlos Jobim
- Concerto (arr by CBL) by George Frederic Handel
- Concerto (arr CBL) by Johann Sebastian Bach
- Modinha (arr Bobby Scott) by Francisco Mignone
- Amazonia (arr CBL) by Laurindo Almeida

== Arrangements ==
- Fifteen Sonatas by Domenico Scarlatti
- Sonata no.2 by Johann Sebastian Bach
- Suite by George Frederic Handel
- Six Lute Pieces by Silvius Leopold Weiss
- Several pieces by Claude Debussy, Maurice Ravel, Erik Satie, and Gabriel Faure
- Several pieces by Isaac Albeniz & Enrique Granados
- Works by Ernesto Lecuona, Rafael Hernandez Marin, Cesar Almodovar, Enric Madriguera, Agustin Lara, Alberto Dominguez, Alvaro Carrillo, Ruben Fuentes
- Pieces by Antonio Carlos Jobim, Alfredo da Rocha Viana Filho Pixinguinha, along with pieces by Luiz Bonfa, Noel Rosa, Ary Barroso, Ernesto Nazareth, Catullo do Paixao Cearense
- Many arrangements of music composed by Mason Williams, George Gershwin, Cole Porter, Dave Brubeck, Irving Berlin, Scott Joplin, and several that incorporate American folk songs
- Music from Scandinavian countries and several pieces by Kurt Weill have been arranged, with other, more well-known pieces such as "Don't Cry for Me Argentina" (from Evita) by Andrew Lloyd Webber; "Send in the Clowns" by Stephen Sondheim, "Nuages" by Django Reinhardt, "Summer of '42", by Michel Legrand, and "Memory" (from Cats), by Andrew Lloyd Webber

== Discography ==
- 1982 Plays the Music of Antonio Carlos Jobim & George Gershwin (Concord)
- 1983 Plays 'The Entertainer' and Selected Works by Scott Joplin (Concord)
- 1984 Plays the Music of Luiz Bonfa & Cole Porter (Concord)
- 1985 Impressions (Concord)
- 1987 Brazil, with Love with Sharon Isbin (Concord)
- 1988 Rhapsody in Blue/West Side Story with Sharon Isbin (Concord)
- 1989 Music of the Brazilian Masters with Laurindo Almeida, Charlie Byrd (Concord Picante)
- 1991 Music of the Americas (Concord Picante)
- 1991 Chants for the Chief with Gaudencio Thiago de Mello (Concord Picante)
- 1993 Ginastera's Sonata (Concord Jazz)
- 1995 Twilight in Rio (Concord)
- 1996 From Yesterday to Penny Lane (Concord)
- 1997 O Boto (Concord)
- 2001 Mambo No. 5 with Eddie Gomez (Khaeon)
- 2003 Natalia (Khaeon)
- 2004 Frenesi (Zoho) (note that the content is identical to what's on Natalia)
- 2004 Siboney (Zoho) (note that the content is identical to what's on Mambo No. 5)
- 2006 Carioca (Zoho)
- 2007 Alma y Corazon with Berta Rojas (On)
- 2009 Merengue (Zoho)
- 2013 Leo Brouwer: Beatlerianas (Zoho)
- 2015 The Chantecler Sessions Vol. 1 1958–1959 (Zoho)
- 2016 The Chantecler Sessions Vol. 2 1960–1962 (Zoho)
- 2016 Plays Mason Williams (Zoho)
- 2019 Delicado (Zoho)

== Books and monographs ==
- 1984 Belwin Mills Music of Scott Joplin
- 1993 Mel Bay Master Anthology of Blues Guitar Solos (Volume I) (Book/CD)
- 1993 Warner Bros. Music of Isaac Albéniz (Book/CD)
- 1994 Mel Bay Brazilian Music for Acoustic Guitar (two volumes)
- 1995 Warner Bros. Music of Debussy & Ravel
- 1996 Mel Bay Suite Antilliana composed by Ernesto Cordeiro (Book/CD)
- 1997 Mel Bay Brazilian Jazz Guitar Styles (BookCD)
- 1998 Mel Bay 30 Short Pieces for Guitar (Book/CD)
- 1999 Mel Bay Arpreggio Studies for Guitar (Book/CD)

== Publications ==
Guitar Solo Publications (GSP): arrangements by Carlos Barbosa-Lima

- Three American Folk Songs
- Four Pieces by Luiz Bonfa
- Six Pieces by Dave Brubeck
- Eleven Immortal Songs by Catullo da Paixao Cearense
- Samba Chorado by Thiago de Mello
- Nine Pieces by Antonio Carlos Jobim
- Seven Valsas de Esquina by Francisco Mignone
- Four Pieces by Ernesto Nazareth
- Eight Pieces by Alfredo Viana "Pixinguinha"
- Four Pieces by Alfredo Vianna "Pixinguinha"
- Impressions – Eleven Pieces by Faure, Ravel, Debussy, Satie
- Twelve Modinhas – by various authors

Columbia Music Company (CMC): arrangements by Carlos Barbosa-Lima

- Sonatas by Domenico Scarlatti
- Sonata No.2 (orig. violin) by Johann Sebastian Bach
- Suite (orig. harpsichord) by George Frederic Haendel
- Concerto for Guitar & String Orchestra by George Frederic Haendel
- Six Lute Pieces by Sylvius Leopold Weiss
- Cadiz by Isaac Albeniz
- Cordoba by Isaac Albeniz
- Spanish Dances No. 3 & 6 by Enrique Granados

Original works by various authors edited by Carlos Barbosa-Lima

- Twelve Etudes by Francisco Mignone (dedicated to Barbosa-Lima)
- Suite by Leonardo Balada
- Sonatina by Albert Harris
- Partita by John Duarte (dedicated to Barbosa-Lima)
- Valsa-Choro by Guido Santorsola (dedicated to Barbosa-Lima)

Warner Brothers: arrangements by Carlos Barbosa-Lima

- Music by Scott Joplin
- Music by Isaac Albeniz
- Music by Debussy and Ravel

Boosey and Hawkes

- Sonata Op.47 by Alberto Ginastera (dedicated to Barbosa-Lima)
- Two Dances from Suite de Danzas Criollas (arranged by Barbosa-Lima)

Ricordi Brasileira

- Suite Antiga by Guido Santorsola (edited by Barbosa-Lima)

Videos

- 1964 Vereda da Salvacao soundtrack (with Viola Brasileira)
- 1983 Deal of the Century soundtrack
- 1984 Selected Solos
- 1997 Estrada do Sol
- 1999 Favorite Guitar Solos (Mel Bay)
- 2001 Classic Guitar (Mel Bay)

== Articles ==
- Interview (1984), by Paul Magnussen
