= Clorinda Rosato =

Brazilian composer, pianist and teacher

Clorinda Rosato (11 December 1913 – 22 May 1985) was a Brazilian composer, pianist and teacher.

Rosato was born in Sao Simao, Brazil. She studied music at the Conservatorio Dramatico Musical of Sao Paulo. Her teachers included Martin Braunwieser, Ines de Campo, Antonio Candido, Furio Frenceschini, Miguel Antonio Gallo, Francisco Mignone, Alice Ornellas, Artur Pereira and Frutuoso Viana.

Rosato gave her first piano recital in 1932 and performed until 1965, when she retired to teach. Her music is available through the Instituto Piano Brasileiro. Her compositions include:

== Chamber music ==
- Improviso (violin, cello and piano)
- Quatro Ensaios (string quartet)

== Piano ==
- Anjo da Garda
- Baby
- Brinquedo de Roda
- Caximbobo
- Chaconne
- Danca do Caboclo
- Dance Movement
- Seresta (also arranged for voice and piano)
- Sonata
- Valsa Afetuosa
- Valsinha
- Waltzes No. 1, 2, and 3

== Vocal ==
- Ave Maria (chorus)
- Engenho Novo (chorus)
- Impressoes Sobre uma Missa de Ano Santo
- “Natal Brasileiro”
- “Quatro Corais”
- “Seresta” (also arranged for piano)
- Tatu e Cabocio do Sui (chorus)
- “Trovas”
