= David Paterson (disambiguation) =

David Paterson (born 1954) is a New York politician.

David Paterson may also refer to:

- David Paterson (academic) (born 1959), British physiologist and academic
- David L. Paterson, screenwriter, actor and producer
- David Paterson (South Dakota politician), one of the Members of the South Dakota State Senate

== See also ==
- David Patterson (disambiguation)
- David Peterson (disambiguation)
