= Maria Matos Priolli =

Maria Luisa de Matos Priolli (24 May 1915 - 2000) was a Brazilian composer, conductor, music educator, and pianist, who produced works through at least opus 21 as well as three textbooks.

Matos Priolli was born in Rio de Janeiro, where she began her music studies with her mother. Later, she studied at the Instituto Nacional de Musica in Rio de Janeiro and at Trinity College of Music (today the Trinity Laban Conservatoire of Music and Dance) in London, where she obtained a teacher's diploma. Her teachers included Granville Bantock, William Chatermann, Agnelo Franca, Francisco Mignone, Joao Otaviano, Mary Alice Rumley, and Paulo Silva.

In 1937, Matos Priolli began teaching at the Instituto Nacional de Musica, eventually becoming its director from 1976 to 1980. She belonged to the Women's Academy of Letters and Arts of Rio de Janeiro. Her works included:

== Books ==
- Basic Principles of Music for Youth
- Melodic and Progressive Solfèges (two volumes)
- Ornament Execution by Rhythmic Unit

== Chamber ==
- String Quartet in F Major
- Three Studies (violin)
- Trio in G Major

== Orchestra ==
- Concerto in c minor for piano and orchestra

== Organ ==
- Fugue

== Piano ==
- Caprice Serenade
- Carioca Lundu
- Children's Rounds No. 1 and 2
- Fugue and Postlude
- Sonata, opus 21

== Vocal ==
- Alleluia (four voices)
- Ave Maria (traditional text)
- Christmas Gift (text by anonymous/unidentified)
- Festival Mass (two voices)
- Inquietude (text by anonymous/unidentified)
- Longing (text by anonymous/unidentified)
- Presence (text by anonymous/unidentified)
- Sanctus (four voices)
