= Davie Patterson =

Scotland international rugby union player

- Born: David Patterson; 11 December 1871 Hawick, Scotland
- Died: 21 January 1945 (aged 73) Hawick, Scotland

Rugby union career
- Position: Scrum half
Amateur team(s)
Years	Team	Apps	(Points)
- Hawick
Provincial / State sides
Years	Team	Apps	(Points)
1897	South of Scotland		
International career
Years	Team	Apps	(Points)
1896	Scotland	1	(0)

Davie Patterson (11 December 1871 – 21 January 1945) was a Scotland international rugby union player. He played as a Scrum half.

== Rugby Union career ==
=== Amateur career ===
He played for Hawick. He captained the side for 3 seasons and won the 1895-96 season Scottish Unofficial Championship with the club.

He played at Scrum half, forming a half back pairing with Matthew Elliot.

=== Provincial career ===
He played for South of Scotland against North of Scotland District on 11 December 1897 and captained the side.

The Scottish Referee profiled Patterson for the match:

Davie as he is popularly named in Hawick, is player of extensive and varied experience. For three seasons he captained the Hawick team, and in many a hard fought match the lively quarter back has been the salvation of his side. He has played in all the representative matches, and has represented his country against Wales. Physically there is not much of him, but he is as hard nails, and his energy never seems to tire. Patterson is a bit over 20, and assists his father, who a well-known sheep and cattle salesman.

=== International career ===
He was capped just the once for Scotland, in 1896.

== Business career ==
He was a cattle dealer and meat salesman. He ran the family business D. Patterson and Sons, which he took over from his father.

== Family ==
He was born to David Patterson and Maggie Scott. They had 3 daughters and 5 sons, including Davie.

== Death ==
His wife predeceased him, and he was survived by a grown-up family.
