= David Patterson (historian) =

American historian (born 1948)

David Patterson (born 1948) is a historian and professor at the Ackerman Center for Holocaust Studies, University of Texas at Dallas. Patterson's areas of expertise are Holocaust, Jewish Thought, Anti-Semitism and Israel. He is the Hillel A. Feinberg Distinguished Chair in Holocaust Studies. Patterson is author of a study of Holocaust memoir literature and said that reading of first person testimonials has a function, the reader "must become not an interpreter of texts but a mender of the world, a part of the recovery that this memory demands".

== Works ==
- Patterson, David; Roth, John K., eds. (2005). Fire in the Ashes: God, Evil, And the Holocaust. University of Washington Press. ISBN 978-0-295-98547-3.
- Patterson, David (2010). A Genealogy of Evil: Anti-Semitism from Nazism to Islamic Jihad. Cambridge University Press. ISBN 978-1-139-49243-0.
- Patterson, David (2012). Open Wounds: The Crisis of Jewish Thought in the Aftermath of the Holocaust. University of Washington Press. ISBN 978-0-295-80316-6.
- Patterson, David (2012). Genocide in Jewish Thought. Cambridge University Press. ISBN 978-1-107-01104-5.
- Patterson, David (2014). The Shriek of Silence: A Phenomenology of the Holocaust Novel. University Press of Kentucky. ISBN 978-0-8131-6149-5.
- Patterson, David (2015). Anti-Semitism and its Metaphysical Origins. Cambridge University Press. ISBN 978-1-316-23999-5.
