= São Paulo Dance School =

Public dance school in São Paulo, Brazil

- Escola de Dança de São Paulo
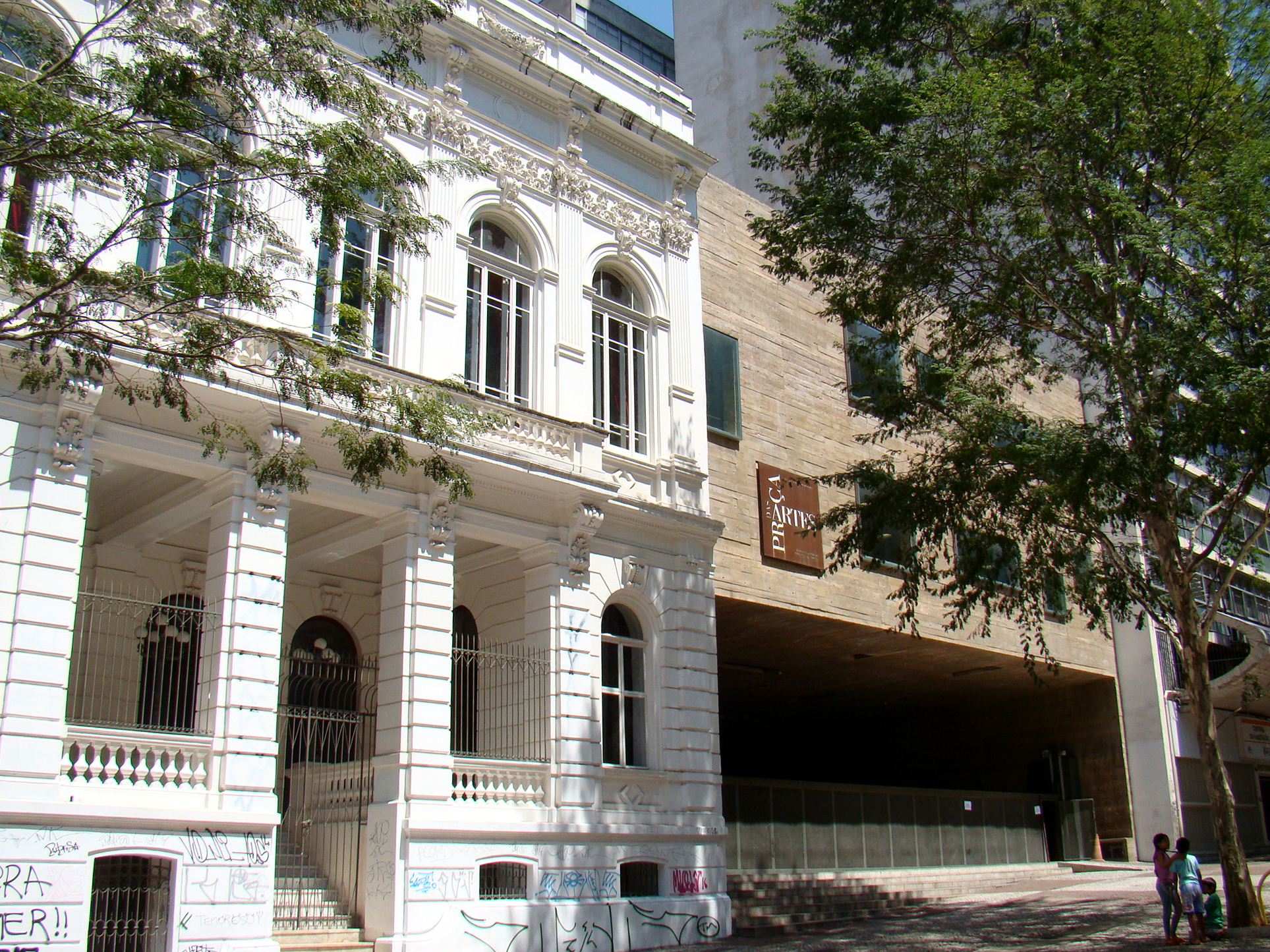
- Former names: Escola de Dança do Theatro Municipal de São Paulo; Escola Municipal de Bailado
- Type: Public school
- Established: May 2, 1940; 86 years ago
- Location: São Paulo, São Paulo; Brazil; 23°32′39″S 46°38′13″W

The São Paulo School of Dance (Portuguese: Escola de Dança de São Paulo - EDASP), also known as the São Paulo Municipal Theater Dance School (Escola de Dança do Theatro Municipal de São Paulo - EDTMSP) or the Municipal Ballet School (Escola Municipal de Bailado), is located in the Brazilian city of São Paulo. It is linked to the training center of the São Paulo Municipal Theater Foundation.

Currently run by Cristiana de Souza, the school is based in Praça das Artes and caters to around 800 students. It is one of the most traditional dance schools in Brazil and has trained generations of artists.

== History ==
The São Paulo School of Dance was inaugurated on May 2, 1940, under the administration of Mayor Francisco Prestes Maia, as the Experimental School of Classical Dance (Escola Experimental de Dança Clássica). The aim was to establish an amateur corps de ballet focused on romantic classical ballet in order to meet the choreographic demands of the national and foreign operatic productions at the São Paulo Municipal Theater. In the first month, the group premiered the opera Aida.

It operated in one of the rooms at the Municipal Theater. In 1943, the school was transferred to the lower level of the Viaduto do Chá due to the need for more space to accommodate the growing number of students. Initially, it offered a course in Classical Dance for Children and Young People. In 1952, Musical Initiation and Dance History were added. In 1957, Decree No. 3,431 regulated the 8-year training course.

In the 1970s, it became known as the Municipal Ballet School (Escola Municipal de Bailado) and included Modern Dance as a language of expression. At the beginning of the 1980s, a new teaching program focusing on dance awareness, both physically and intellectually, was created. Decree No. 21.988 of 1986 established the Municipal Youth Dance Corps, which provided a unique artistic development opportunity for the school's students. Decree No. 30.593 of 1991 introduced the subjects of Music, Art History, Modern Technique and Improvisation into the curriculum.

In 1987, Jânio Quadros, then mayor of the city of São Paulo, abolished the course and banned homosexuals from entering the school. After criticizing the measure, Klauss Vianna, a dancer and former director of the school, was attacked in front of his house. In 2011, it was renamed São Paulo School of Dance (Escola de Dança de São Paulo) after the creation of the São Paulo Municipal Theater Foundation. Since 2014 it has been based in the Praça das Artes building.

== See also ==
- Tourism in the city of São Paulo
