= Theatro Municipal (São Paulo) =

Coordinates: 23°32′43″S 46°38′19″W

São Paulo Municipal Theatre
- Theatro Municipal de São Paulo
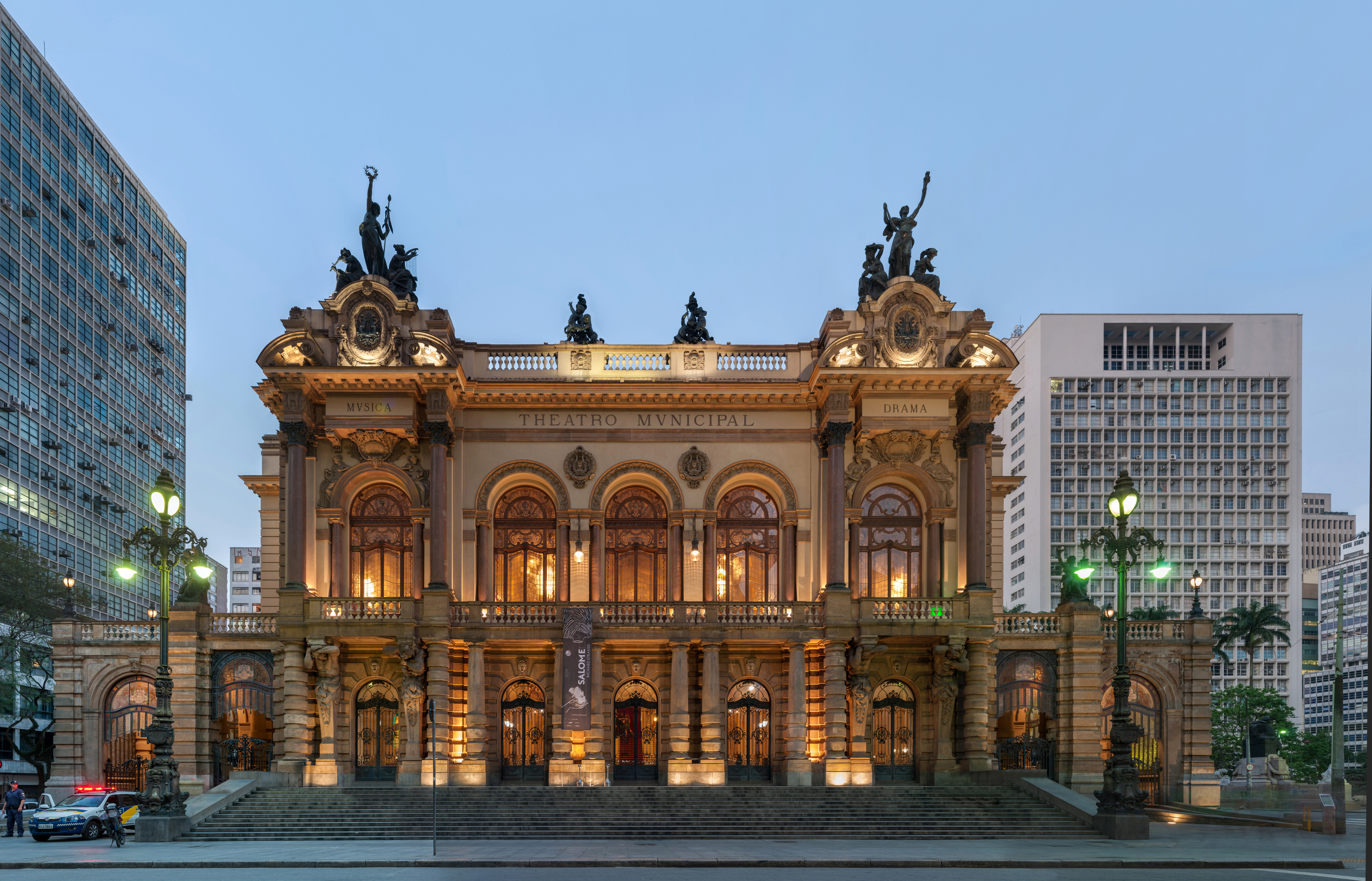
- The main façade, after the 2011 restoration.
- Interactive map of the São Paulo Municipal Theatre area
- Alternative names: Municipal

General information
- Type: Opera house
- Architectural style: Renaissance, Baroque and Art Nouveau
- Location: Ramos de Azevedo Square, Centro, São Paulo
- Construction started: 1903
- Completed: 1911
- Inaugurated: 12 September 1911

Design and construction
- Architects: Ramos de Azevedo; Claudio Rossi; Domiziano Rossi

Other information
- Seating capacity: 1523

National Historic Heritage of Brazil
- Designated: 1995
- Reference no.: 1349

Municipal Theatre of São Paulo is a theatre in São Paulo, Brazil. It is regarded as one of the landmarks of the city, significant both for its architectural value as well as for its historical importance, having been the venue for the Week of Modern Art in 1922, which revolutionised the arts in Brazil. The building now houses the São Paulo Municipal Symphonic Orchestra, the Coral Lírico (Lyric Choir) and the City Ballet of São Paulo.

== History ==
=== Design, construction and inauguration ===
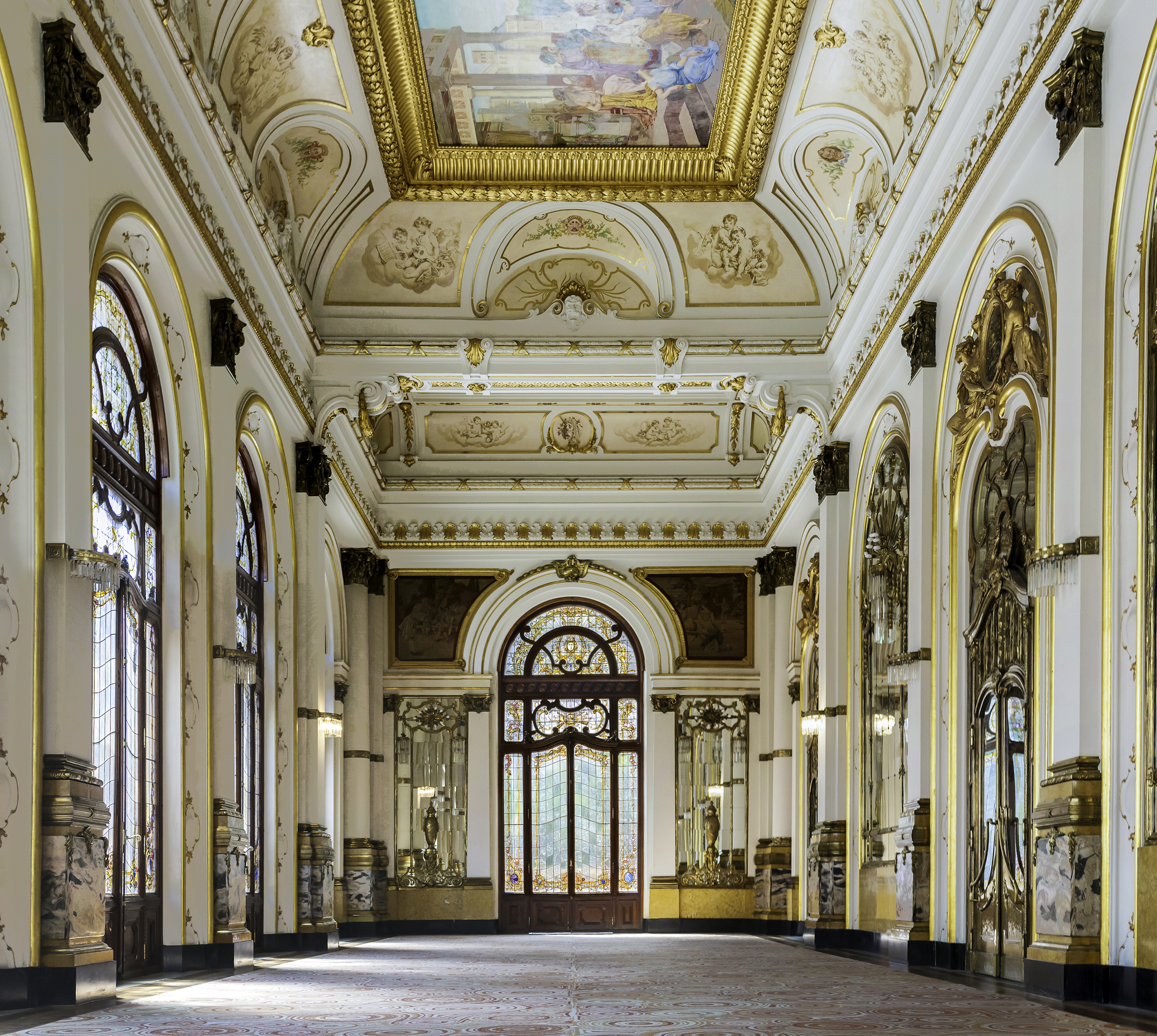
The "Noble Room"

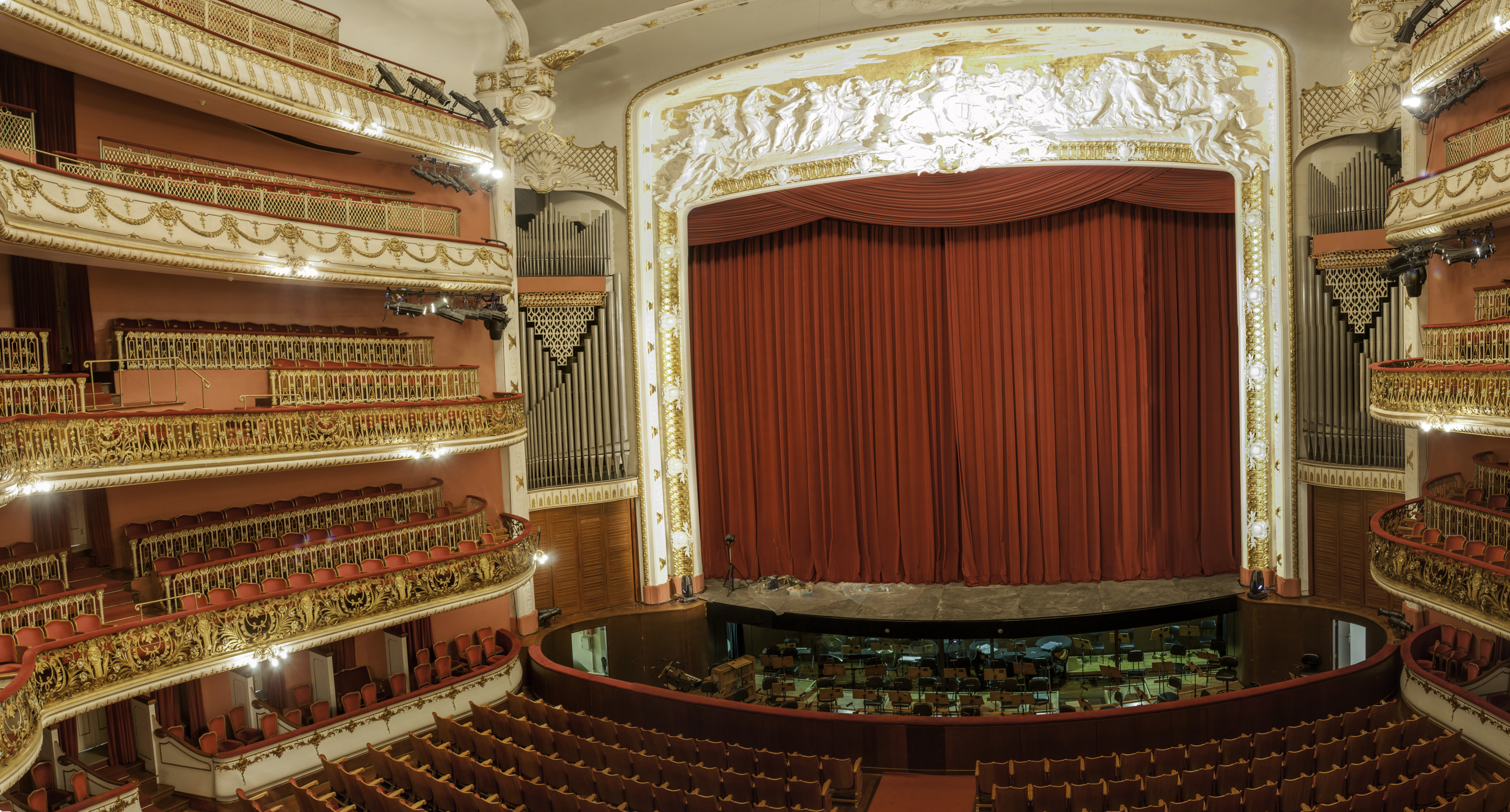
The Great Hall

The idea of building a representative theatre for the city of São Paulo was inspired by the increasing importance of the city on the international cultural scene. São Paulo was inhabited by the Brazilian bourgeoisie from the beginning of 20th century; a group, in great part, involved in coffee farming. The city also had a significantly large Italian population, an immigrant community with both stage artists and experience with theatre construction. Residents of São Paulo initially could only rely on the São José Theater, which suffered a fire and was no longer suitable for large foreign productions. There were more modest theatres such as the Polythéama, the Minerva, and the Apolo. The aristocrats of the São Paulo demanded the creation of a new theatre, with a structure similar to some of the best theatres in the world and suitable for staging large opera productions.

The place which was chosen for the construction was Morro do Chá, or Tea Hill, which had been the site of the new São José Theater. Ramos de Azevedo was the engineer assigned to the construction. He was also helped by two Italian architects Cláudio Rossi and Domiziano Rossi. In 1903, construction began, and São Paulo gained one of the best venues in the world for the presentation of theatre productions, mainly operas. As was customary at the time, the majority of the construction materials was imported from Europe, and the architecture was inspired by the Palais Garnier of Paris. The construction lasted about 8 years. The first staged production was the opera Hamlet by Ambroise Thomas. The initial idea was to present Antonio Carlos Gomes' opera Il Guarany featuring star baritone Titta Ruffo, but Ruffo didn't have any role by Gomes in his repertoire and suggested that Ambroise Thomas's Hamlet be performed instead, since it was his favorite role. Also, other problems arose before the opening night. The stage decorations arrived late, which caused the postponement of the opening date. When the theatre finally opened on 12 September 1911, the result surpassed all the expectations of the public and the city's dominant class.

=== The first years ===
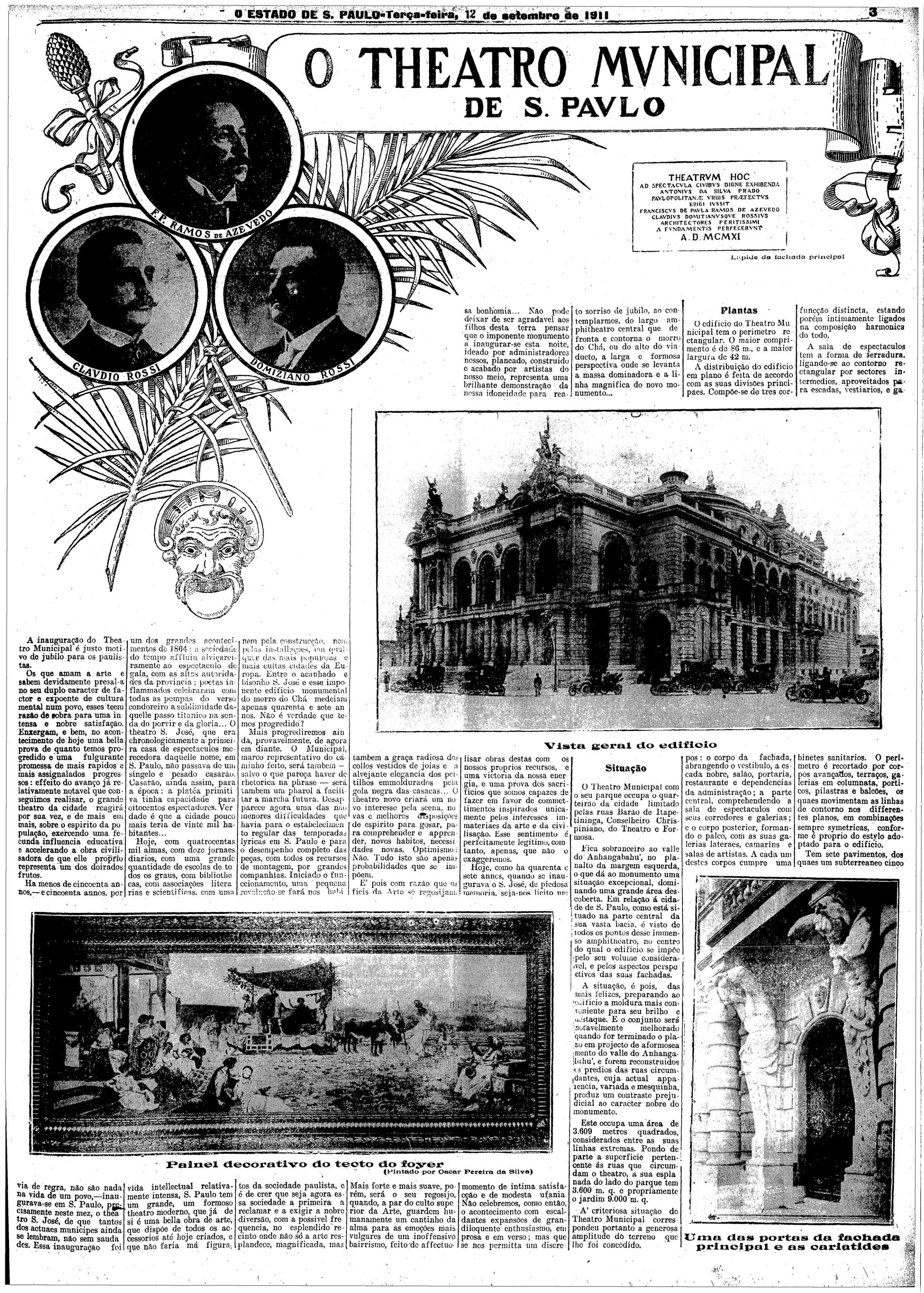
First page of article from O Estado de S. Paulo about the Theatro Municipal inauguration, September 12, 1911

Between 1912 and 1926, the theatre presented 88 operas of 41 composers (Italian, French, Brazilian and German), in 270 performances. But perhaps the most important event in the history of the theatre in that period and in all of its existence was not an opera, but something that would infuriate many paulistanos at the time: the Week of Modern Art in 1922.

=== The Week of Modern Art ===
Between 11 February and 18 February (1922) the Municipal Theatre hosted a Modernist event that has become known as "Semana de Arte Moderna" of 1922. During the seven days of events there was an exposition of the art of Brazilian Modernismo—a movement that sought to break away with strictly set patterns of European-influenced realistic paintings, drama, poetry, and music. In the evenings of 13, 15 and 17 February there were presentations of music, poetry and lectures on modernity in Brazil and the rest of the world. Modernism defied all the existing aesthetic and artistic values dominating painting, literature, poetry and other arts until that time. The "week" presented artists who were to become some of the most celebrated names in the Brazilian Modernist Movement, such as: Mário de Andrade—a writer, musician and folklorist--, Oswald de Andrade—a writer--, Tarsila do Amaral, Anita Malfatti and Menotti Del Picchia—all three painters. These artists formed the famous "Group of Five". Victor Brecheret—sculptor—Heitor Villa-Lobos—composer—and Di Cavalcanti—painter—were other celebrities who took part in the Week.

=== Middle of 20th century ===
As the years went by, the theatre, which had been made almost exclusively for opera presentations, hosted also other artistic events, for example performances of dancers such as Anna Pavlova and Isadora Duncan. In the 1960s, under Mayor José Vicente Faria Lima, the building went through its first refurbishment because its walls had been repainted and the original project was deprived of its characteristics.

=== From the end of 20th century to the present day ===
In 1980s, the theatre went through further refurbishments, initiated by Mayor Jânio Quadros. Its main purpose was to restore the original works of Ramos de Azevedo. The external façade was restored with sandstone, originated in the same mine that had supplied material for the original building conception at the beginning of the century. The restoration was completed in 1991 under the Mayor Luiza Erundina. Now 100 years old, the Municipal Theatre of São Paulo is considered one of the most celebrated cultural venues in South America which has continually been hosting theatrical plays and operas by the greatest national and international playwrights and composers. The Municipal Theatre of São Paulo, actually has currently the biggest and best lyric production in South America.

== Famous personalities who appeared in the theatre ==
Renowned artists and celebrities who appeared in the theatre range from actors to ballerinas, coming from the national sphere and from various countries: Carla Fracci, Rudolph Nureyev, Titta Ruffo, Enrico Caruso, Maria Callas, Bidu Sayão, Tito Schipa, Arturo Toscanini, Procópio Ferreira, Cacilda Becker, Vivien Leigh, Raymond Jérôme, Mário de Andrade, Oswald de Andrade, Tarsila do Amaral, Anita Malfatti, Menotti Del Picchia, Victor Brecheret, Heitor Villa-Lobos, Di Cavalcanti, Lasar Segall, Marcia Haydée, Mikhail Baryshnikov, Roger Waters and Paulo Szot.

== See also ==
- Week of modern art of 1922
- Praça das Artes
- São Paulo Dance School
