= Camargo Guarnieri =

Brazilian composer

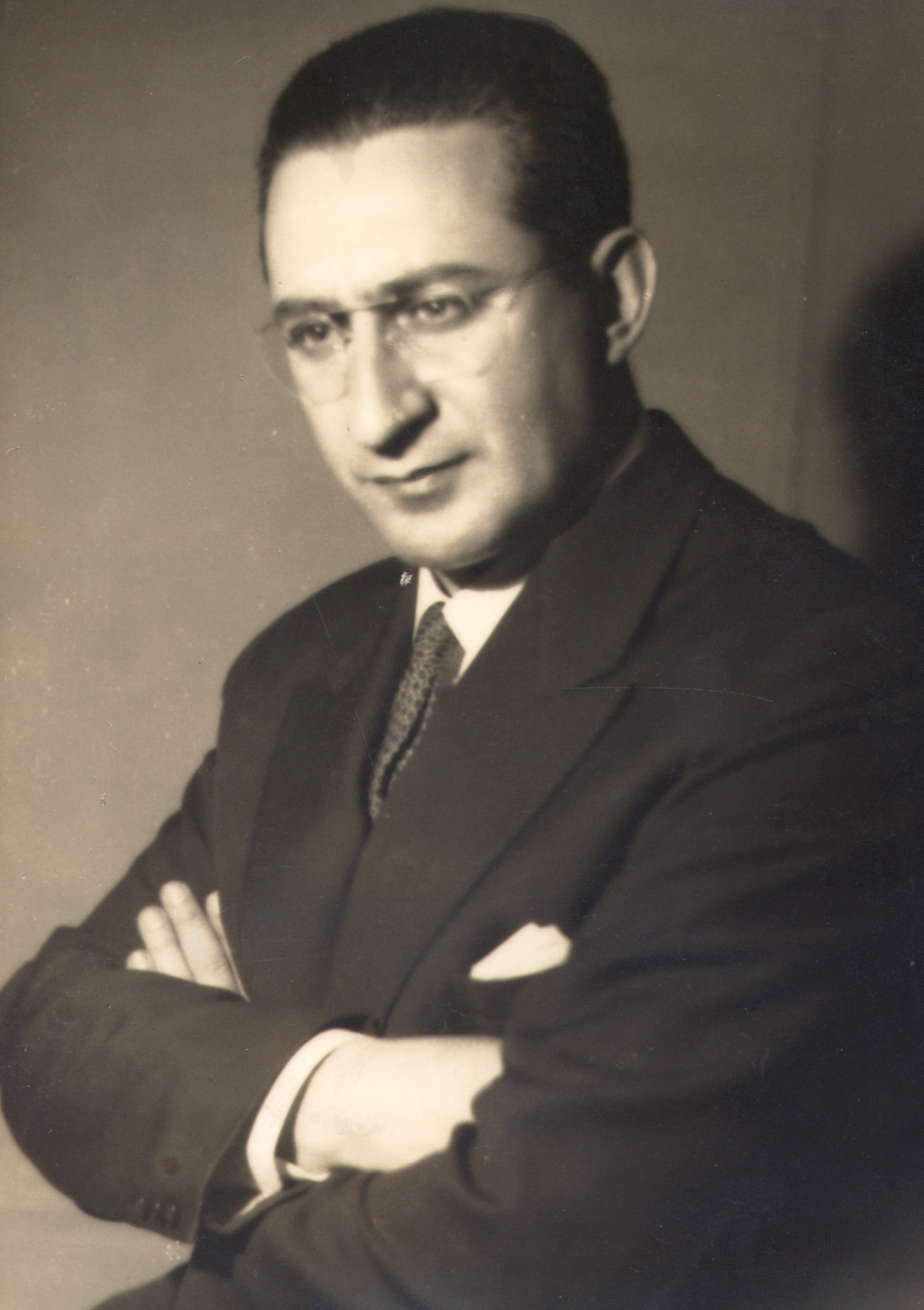
Camargo Guarnieri

Mozart Camargo Guarnieri (February 1, 1907 – January 13, 1993) was a Brazilian composer.

Guarnieri was born in Tietê, São Paulo. He studied piano, composition, and conducting in São Paulo and Paris. His compositions received significant recognition in the United States during the 1940s, leading to conducting opportunities in major American cities.

A key figure in the Brazilian national school, Guarnieri served as a conductor, a member of the Academia Brasileira de Música, and Director of the São Paulo Conservatório. His extensive oeuvre includes symphonies, concertos, operas, chamber music, piano pieces, and songs.

Regarded by some as the most important Brazilian composer after Heitor Villa-Lobos, Guarnieri was awarded the Gabriela Mistral Prize shortly before his death.

== Name ==
Guarnieri was born in Tietê, São Paulo, and registered at birth as Mozart Guarnieri, but when he began a musical career, he decided his first name was too pretentious. Thus he adopted his mother's maiden name Camargo as a middle name, and thenceforth signed himself M. Camargo Guarnieri. In 1948, he legally changed his name to Mozart Camargo Guarnieri, but continued to sign only the initial of his first name.

Guarnieri's Italian father, Michele Guarneri?, a lover of classical music, named one of Camargo's brothers Rossine (a Portuguese misspelling of Rossini), and two others Verdi and Bellini.

== Life ==
Guarnieri studied piano with Ernani Braga and Antonio de Sá Pereira and composition with Lamberto Baldi at the Conservatório Dramático e Musical de São Paulo. In 1938, a fellowship from the Council of Artistic Orientation allowed him to travel to Paris, where he studied composition and aesthetics with Charles Koechlin and conducting with François Ruhlmann. Some of his compositions received important prizes in the United States in the 1940s, giving Guarnieri the opportunity of conducting them in New York, Boston, Los Angeles and Chicago. A distinguished figure of the Brazilian national school, he served in several capacities; conductor of the São Paulo Orchestra, member of the Academia Brasileira de Música, and Director of the São Paulo Conservatório, where he taught composition and orchestral conducting. In 1936 he was the first conductor of the Coral Paulistano choir. His œuvre comprises symphonies, concertos, cantatas, two operas, chamber music, many piano pieces, and over fifty songs. In 1972, in Porto Alegre, his compatriot Roberto Szidon gave the first performance of the Piano Concerto No. 4. In 1962 the Soviet Union invited him to participate in the third Congress of Composers in Moscow. Shortly before his death in São Paulo in 1993, he was awarded the Gabriela Mistral Prize by the Organization of American States as the greatest contemporary composer of the Americas.

== Works ==
=== Operas ===
- Pedro Malazarte (comic opera in one act, libretto by Mário de Andrade, premiered in May 1952 at the Theatro Municipal (Rio de Janeiro))
- Um homem só (tragic opera in one act, libretto by Gianfrancesco Guarnieri, premiered on November 29, 1962, at the Theatro Municipal (Rio de Janeiro))

=== Choral ===
Missa Diligite for Chorus and Organ (1972)

=== Orchestral ===
- Symphonies
  - Symphony No. 1 (1944)
  - Symphony No. 2 Uirapuru (1945)
  - Symphony No. 3 (1952)
  - Symphony No. 4 Brasília (1963)
  - Symphony No. 5 (1977), for orchestra and choir
  - Symphony No. 6 (1981)
- Overtures
  - Abertura Concertante (1942)
  - Abertura Festiva (1971)
- Suites
  - Suite infantil (1929)
  - Tres Dansas para Orquestra (1941). The first dance is "Dansa Brasileira" (originally composed for piano in 1928), which is his best-known and most-recorded piece outside South America.
  - Suite IV Centenario (1954)
  - Suite Vila Rica (1957), taken from the music for the film Rebelião em Vila Rica
- Homenagem a Villa-Lobos (1966) for Winds, Piano and Percussion
- Concerto for Orchestra and Percussion (1972)

=== Concertante ===
- Piano
  - Piano Concerto No. 1 (1931)
  - Piano Concerto No. 2 (1946)
  - Chôro for piano and orchestra (1956)
  - Piano Concerto No. 3 (1964)
  - Seresta for Piano and Orchestra (1965)
  - Piano Concerto No. 4 (1968)
  - Piano Concerto No. 5 (1970)
  - Piano Concerto No. 6 (1987)
  - Variations (Variações sobre um tema nordestino) for Piano and Orchestra (1953)
- Violin
  - Violin Concerto No. 1 (1940). This concerto won a Latin-American violin concerto contest in 1943 sponsored by the Pan American Union, prize money donated by Samuel Fels.
  - Chôro for violin and orchestra (1951)
  - Violin Concerto No. 2 (1952)
- Viola
  - Chôro for viola and orchestra (1975)
- Cello
  - Chôro for cello and orchestra (1961). Written for Aldo Parisot, premiered in Carnegie Hall in 1962.
- Flute
  - Chôro for Flute and Chamber Orchestra (1972)
- Clarinet
  - Chôro for Clarinet and Orchestra (1956)
- Bassoon
  - Chôro for Bassoon and Chamber Orchestra (1991)

=== Chamber/instrumental ===
- String quartets
  - String Quartet No. 1 (1932)
  - String Quartet No. 2 (1944)
  - String Quartet No. 3 (1962)
- Cello sonatas
  - Cello Sonata No. 1 (1931)
  - Cello Sonata No. 2 (1955)
  - Cello Sonata No. 3 (1977)
- Violin sonatas
  - Violin Sonata No. 1 (? apparently lost in a taxi)
  - Violin Sonata No. 2 (1933)
  - Violin Sonata No. 3 (1950)
  - Violin Sonata No. 4 (1956)
  - Violin Sonata No. 5 (1959)
  - Violin Sonata No. 6 (1965)
  - Violin Sonata No. 7 (1977–1978)
- Canção Sertaneja for Violin and Piano (1955)
- Encantimento for Violin and Piano (1947)
- Viola Sonata (1950)
- Sonatina for Flute and Piano (1947)
- Flor de Tremembe, for Fifteen Instruments and Percussion (1960)

=== Piano ===
- Dança Brasileira (1928)
- Dança Selvagem (1931)
- Ponteios, Book I (1931–35)
- Dança Negra (1946)
- Ponteios, Book II (1947–49)
- Estudo No. 1 (1949)
- Estudo No. 2 (1949)
- Estudo No. 3 (1949)
- Estudo No. 4 (1954)
- Estudo No. 5 (1950)
- Suite Mirim (1953)
- Ponteios, Book III (1954–55)
- Ponteios, Book IV (1956–57)
- Ponteios, Book V (1958–59)
- Sonatina No. 3 for Piano
- Sonatina No. 4 for Piano (1958)
- Sonatina No. 6 for Piano
- Estudo No. 6 (1962)
- Estudo No. 7 (1962)
- Estudo No. 8 (1962)
- Estudo No. 9 (1962)
- Estudo No. 10 (1962)
- Estudo No. 11 (1968)
- Estudo No. 12 (1968)
- Estudo No. 13 (1969)
- Estudo No. 14 (1969)
- Estudo No. 15 (1970)
- Piano Sonata (1972)
- Estudo No. 16 (1984)
- Estudo No. 17 (1985)
- Estudo No. 18 (1981)
- Estudo No. 19 (1988)
- Estudo No. 20 (1982)

=== Vocal ===
- Cinco Poemas de Alice (1954) for Soprano and Piano

== See also ==
- List of Brazilian musicians
