= Spcine =

Brazilian municipal-owned enterprise

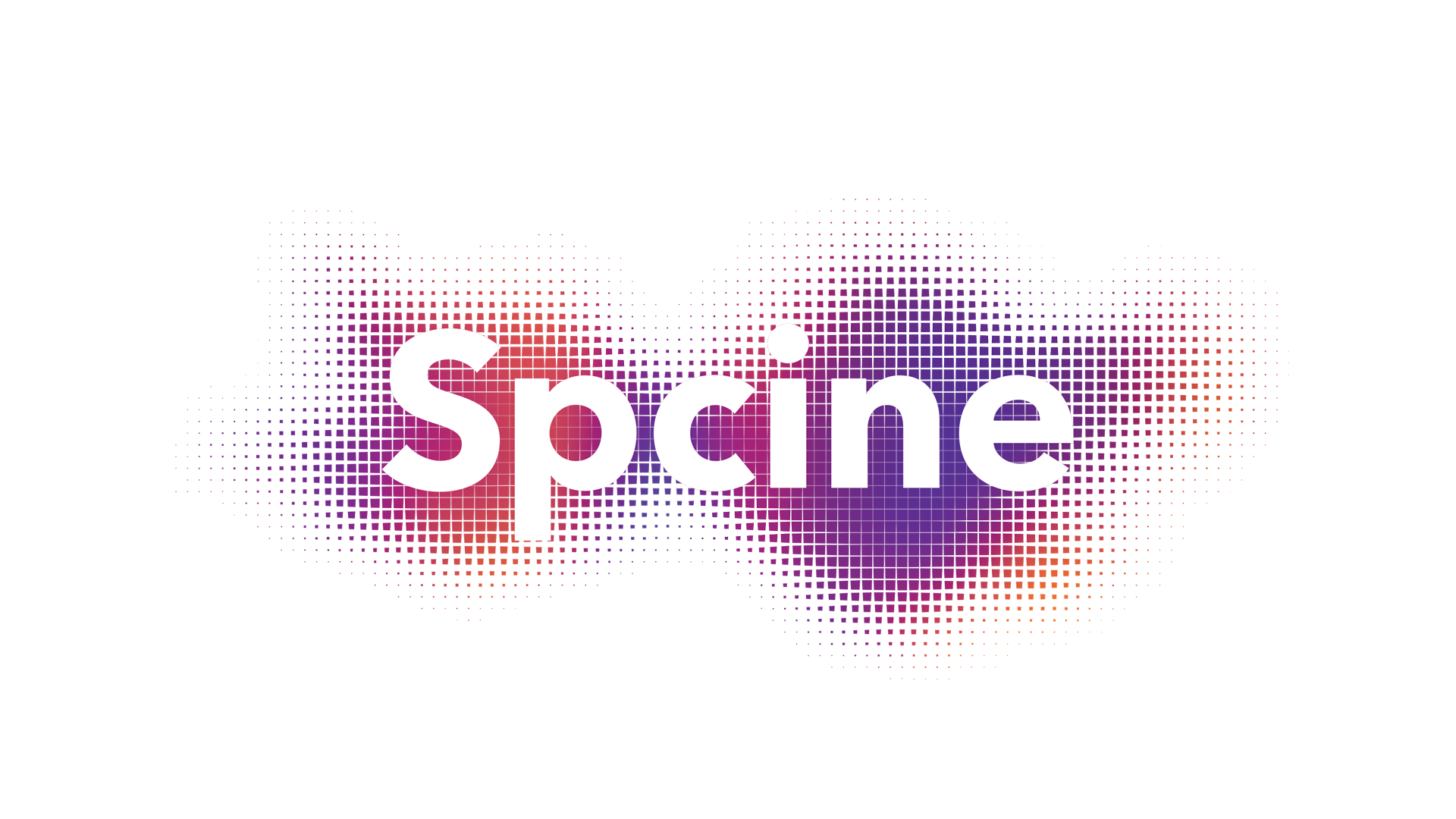
- Official logo
- Formation: 2015; 11 years ago
- Type: State-owned enterprise
- Headquarters: São Paulo, Brazil
- Website: www.spcine.com.br

Spcine is a state-owned company in São Paulo, founded in 2015 as an initiative of the São Paulo Municipal Government focused on the development of the film, TV, games and new media industries.

== History ==
The company, authorized by Law 15.929, was created during mayor Fernando Haddad's administration, with the goal of promoting the development of the audiovisual industry in São Paulo. Linked to the São Paulo Secretariat of Culture, it now encompasses the activities of the São Paulo Film commission, which receives all applications for authorizations for film productions shooting in public spaces in the city of São Paulo since its creation in 2016; the Circuito Spcine of public movie theaters, created in April 2016; Spcine Play, Brazil's only public streaming platform, created in November 2017; and Spcine Game, an incubator for digital games, created in April 2020.

Spcine also produces a number of guides to facilitate the contact with local companies and professionals of the audiovisual industry, such as:

- "Production Companies Based in São Paulo", in English, containing 50 production companies based in the city that work with the international market.
- "Film in São Paulo", in English, containing basic guidelines to all those interested in filming in São Paulo.

On October 1, 2021, Spcine's São Paulo Film Commission – SPFilm launched a rebranded platform for registration and access of companies and professionals based in São Paulo that work in or for the audiovisual industry, ranging from production companies to catering services, drivers, studios, etc.

On October 6, 2021, Spcine launched The City of São Paulo Film Attraction Program, Brazil's first audiovisual production attraction program through cash rebate.

== Spcine Play ==
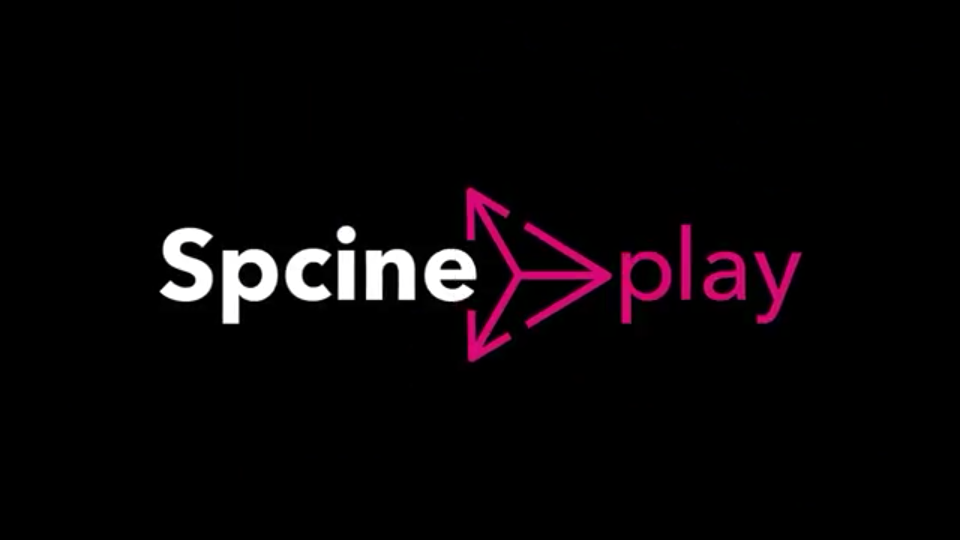
Spcine Play-official logo

In late 2016, Spcine announced the launch of Spcine Play, a free, public movie streaming service, in partnership with production company O2 Filmes and technology company Hacklab. Between December 2020 and January 2021, Spcine Play temporarily made 320 titles available to watch, free of charge. The platform shows films from the main film festivals and related events in São Paulo, as well as a selection of films in partnership with other institutions, festivals and companies:

=== 2020 ===
- Russian Film Festival (promoted by the Ministry of Culture of the Russian Federation and ROSKINO)
- Latin American Film Festival, in partnership with Sesc Digital and Looke
- São Paulo International Film Festival

=== 2021 ===
- My French Film Festival
- Na Quebrada
- Mostra de Cinemas Africanos
- It's All True Film Festival
- 8th edition of the Festival de Finos Filmes
- In-Edit Brazil

== Presidents ==
- 2015–2016: Alfredo Manevy
- 2017–2019: Mauricio Andrade Ramos
- 2019–2021: Laís Bodanzky
- 2021–present: Viviane Ferreira
