= David Patterson (guitarist) =

American guitarist

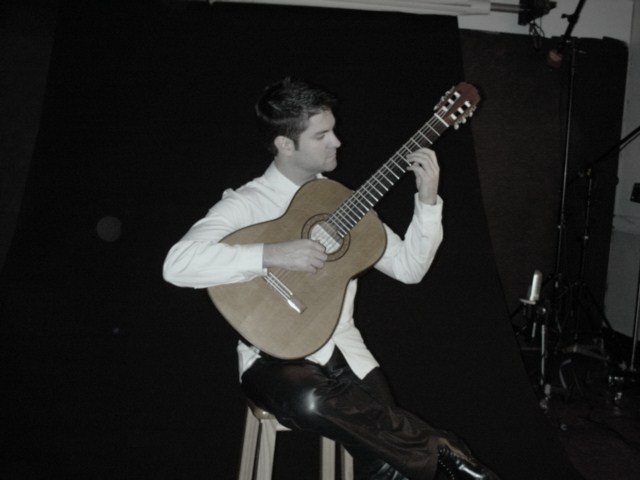
David Patterson, guitar

David Patterson (born November 20, 1966) is an American guitarist. He was the founding member of the New World Guitar Trio and is recognized as a solo performer and arranger.

== Biography ==
David Patterson was born in Red Bank, New Jersey. His father, John Patterson, was an amateur pianist and organist. His mother emigrated from Cuba in the late 1950s and became a school teacher in Rumson, New Jersey where she met John Patterson. David Patterson attended several schools in his youth including boarding school, which he later left to more seriously pursue musical studies.

As a youth, Patterson studied piano and violin as well as the guitar. Among his many teachers were jazz guitarist Harry Leahey, theorist and arranger Dr. Henry Melnik, and classical guitarist Francis Perry. He went on to study at New England Conservatory of Music, where he received both his bachelor's and master's degree with distinction in classical guitar performance. His teachers were David Leisner and Neil Anderson.

Patterson's influences include: Jimmy Page, John McLaughlin, Julian Bream, John Williams, Miles Davis, Jeff Beck, Paco de Lucia, Beethoven, Bach, and Heitor Villa-Lobos.

== The New World Guitar Trio ==
In 1988, Patterson founded the New World Guitar Trio, a group dedicated to commissioning and performing new music as well as creating original arrangements of the standard repertoire. As the group’s producer and arranger, Patterson was praised for his innovative programming and his “ingenious transcriptions of solo piano, chamber, and orchestral works" (Guitar Player magazine). His approach merged the traditional genres of Beethoven and the folk music of Portugal, with the sounds of late 20th-century repertoire. Patterson has collaborated with such composers as Osvaldo Golijov, Claudio Ragazzi, Chiel Meijering, David Leisner, and Dana Brayton on works commissioned by the Trio. The ensemble was praised for its recordings: “Indeed, what’s remarkable…is how fluidly and fluently the New World Guitar Trio makes this program seem idiomatic to three guitars, while providing a refreshing new perspective on the music itself” (Audio Magazine).

Between 1988 and 1997, the members of the Trio included David Patterson, Dean Harada, and Thomas Noren. Harada left the group and was replaced by Thomas Rhode in the summer of 1997. After 15 years of success, the Trio members disbanded in 2003 to pursue individual projects.

== Solo career ==
In addition to his work with the New World Guitar Trio, Patterson has maintained an active solo career, performing with such ensembles as the Auros Group for New Music, Boston Musica Viva, the Boston University Chamber Orchestra, the Boston Modern Orchestra Project, Opera Boston, and the Fromm Players for the Harvard Group for New Music as an artist-in-residence. He has been a guest artist at the Tanglewood Music Festival and Bowdoin International Music Festival. In 2003, Patterson collaborated with composer Osvaldo Golijov and soprano Dawn Upshaw as an arranger and performer in the world premiere of the opera Ainadamar under the baton of Robert Spano at Tanglewood. He was a performer in the Boston premiere of Ainadamar in 2007, with Opera Boston under the baton of Gil Rose and renowned director Peter Sellars. In 2008, Patterson was a guest artist at the Longy School of Music’s tribute to the 100th birthday of legendary American composer, Elliott Carter. He performed Changes, Carter’s most important work for the classical guitar.

== Discography ==
David Patterson can be heard on two New World Guitar Trio recordings: the eponymous New World Guitar Trio (1994) and Exiled (2000). In 2005, his debut solo recording, Esordio was released featuring the music of Bach, Heitor Villa-Lobos, Leo Brouwer, Johann Kaspar Mertz, and Ginastera. Patterson’s work for guitar includes his 2003 recording of Jimmy Page’s “White Summer/Black Mountainside”, featured in a compilation CD Guitar Harvest alongside guitarists Andy Summers, Bill Frisell, and Ralph Towner, among others.

Esordio (T4D 005-01, 2005)
Guitar Harvest (Solid Air Records, SACD 2042, 2003)
Exiled (200NW2-2)
New World Guitar Trio (993TMR-6, 1995)

== Teaching ==
Patterson is on the faculty of Longy School of Music (Cambridge, MA), Tufts University (Medford, MA), and Gordon College (Wenham, MA).
