= Francisco Mignone =

Brazilian composer (1897–1986)

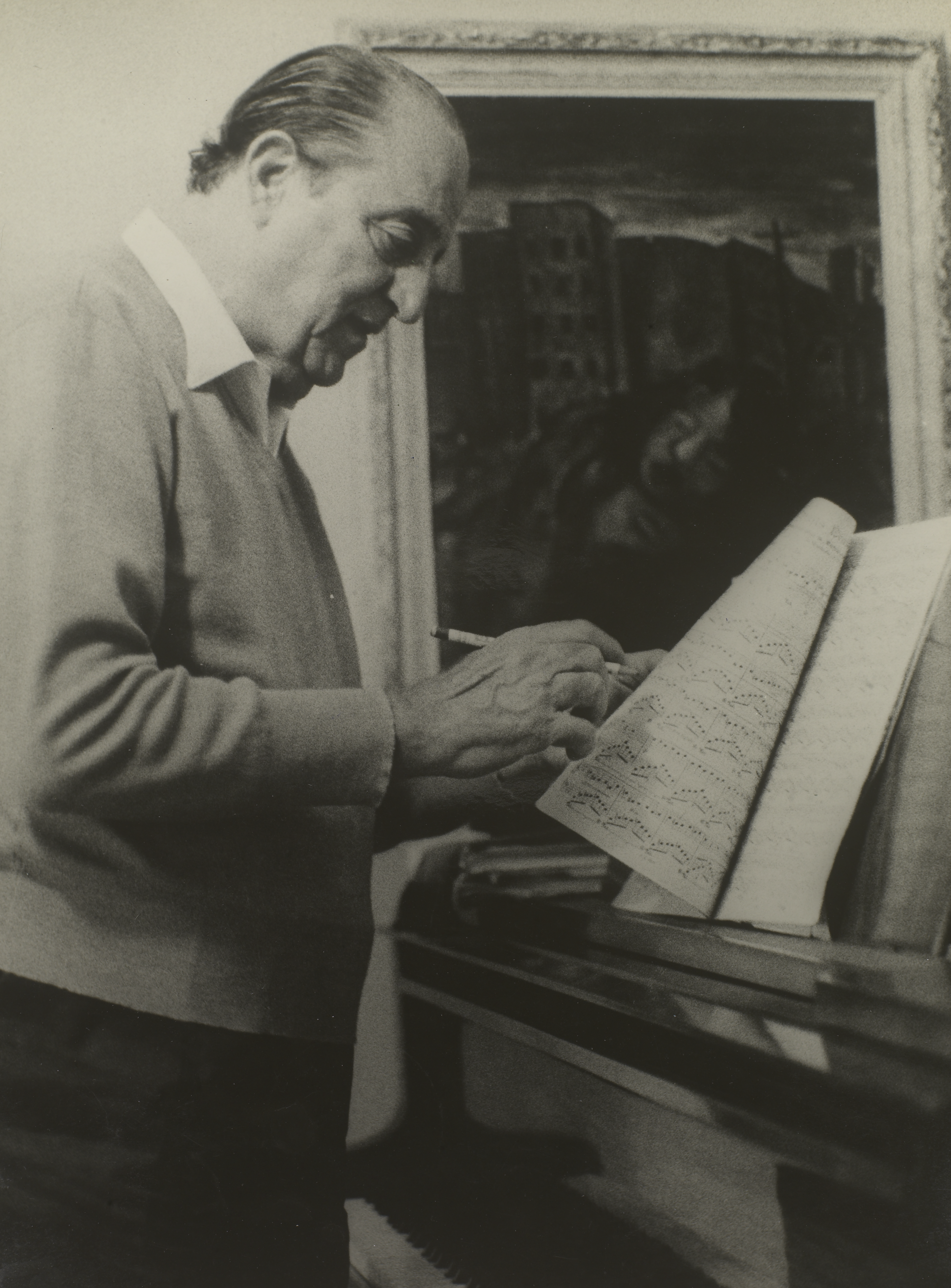
- Mignone in 1972
- Born: September 3, 1897; São Paulo, Brazil
- Died: February 19, 1986 (aged 88); Rio de Janeiro, Brazil
- Education: São Paulo Conservatory, Milan Conservatory
- Occupation: Composer
- Awards: Brazilian composer of the year (1968)

Francisco Paulo Mignone (September 3, 1897, São Paulo – February 19, 1986, Rio de Janeiro) was a Brazilian composer, pianist and conductor. He was one of the most significant figures in Brazilian classical music, and one of the most significant Brazilian composers after Heitor Villa-Lobos. In 1968 he was chosen as Brazilian composer of the year.

== Life and career ==
A graduate of the São Paulo Conservatory and then of the Milan Conservatory, Mignone returned to São Paulo in 1929 to teach harmony, and in 1933 took a post in Rio de Janeiro at the Escola Nacional de Música. Mignone was a versatile composer, dividing his output nearly evenly between solo songs, piano pieces, chamber instrumental works, orchestral works, and choral works. In addition, he wrote five operas and eight ballets.

Son of the Italian immigrant flutist Alferio Mignone, Francisco was already making his mark upon the musical world of Brazil by the time he was 10 years old, gaining notoriety around his district playing in the choro style. A pianist and orchestra leader at 13, he had gained some fame composing and playing under the pseudonym of Chico Bororó, keeping these activities separate from his formal music training. His works may be divided into three compositional periods. His early works show the Italian influences and Romantic sensibilities of his training in Milan. An orchestral piece from his first opera of this early period was premiered in Rio de Janeiro by Richard Strauss conducting the Vienna Philharmonic Orchestra, in 1923.

Much of Mignone's music is strongly nationalistic in flavor; influenced by the nationalistic movement of his former schoolmate and teacher, the musicologist and writer Mário de Andrade, Mignone uses the folk and popular melodies and forms of his native Brazil as a basis for his compositions. (Andrade reportedly said, "In Italian music, Mignone will be one more among a rich and numerous school, to which he does not add anything. Here, he will be of indispensable value.") From 1929 until 1960 his work was most strongly characterized by this nationalism, during which he composed such pieces as the Fantasias Brasileiras and his ballets Maracatu do Chico Rei and Leilão. His solo vocal and piano works of this time earned him particular acclaim for their expression of Brazilian musical styles, such as the choro, the modinha, and the valsas (waltzes) reminiscent of strolling serenaders.

Mignone's music is noted for its lyricism, colorful instrumentation, and improvisatory style. Most of his early works are tonal, as is typical of the popular and folk music, though later in his career he branched out into polytonal, atonal, and serial writing. In the late 1950s Mignone drifted away from the nationalistic music and toward the then-current trends in academic concert music, composing works such as his 1958 Piano Concerto, which showcase his skillful instrumentation and bravura writing. Mignone was capable of writing in a variety of styles and his works of the early 1960s and beyond are noted for their eclecticism; it is difficult to find any other unifying feature. However, he returned to nationalistic writing toward his last few years.

Mignone married Liddy Chiafarelli Mignone, who died in a plane crash in 1962. Later, he married Maria Josephina Mignone with whom he frequently played duets. His students included the Brazilian composers Maria Matos Priolli, Hilda Pires dos Reis, and Clorinda Rosato.

Mignone died in Rio de Janeiro, age 88. His wife, who founded the Francisco Mignone Cultural Center and continued to perform and interpret his music, died in July 2024, aged 101.

== Notable works ==
- O contratador de diamantes, opera, 1921
- Congada (from O contratador), orchestra, 1921
- L'innocente, opera, 1928
- Seis líricas, vocal, 1932
- Maracatu do Chico Rei, ballet, 1933
- Variações sobre um tema brasileiro, cello and orchestra, 1935
- Fantasias brasileiras nos.1–4, piano and orchestra, 1929-1936
- Babaloxá, orchestra, 1936
- Mizú, operetta, 1937
- Quatro líricas, vocal, 1938
- Festa das igrejas, orchestra, 1940
- Leilão, ballet, 1941
- O espantalho, ballet, 1941
- Iara, ballet, 1942
- Pousa a mão na minha testa, vocal, 1942
- Valsas de esquina nos.1–12, piano, 1938–43
- O guarda chuva, ballet, 1953
- Valsas choros 1–12, piano, 1946–55
- Piano Concerto, 1958
- Tres Valsas Brasileiras (1968) Viola e Piano
- Sugestões sinfônicas, tone poem-ballet, 1969
- Doze Estudos, guitar, 1970
- 12 Valsas para Violão , guitar, 1970
- Variações em busca de um tema, orchestra, 1972
- O chalaça, opera, 1973
- O sargento de milícias, opera, 1978
- Quincas Berro d'Agua, ballet, 1979
- Valsa brasileira nos.4–12, piano, 1979
- O Caçador de esmeraldas, ballet, 1980
- 16 valsas para fagote solo, bassoon, 1982

== Recordings ==
- Francisco Mignone: 12 Studies for Guitar (Da Vinci C00614), played by Cyro Delvizio
