= Monument to Ramos de Azevedo =

Monument in São Paulo city, Brazil

- Monumento a Ramos de Azevedo
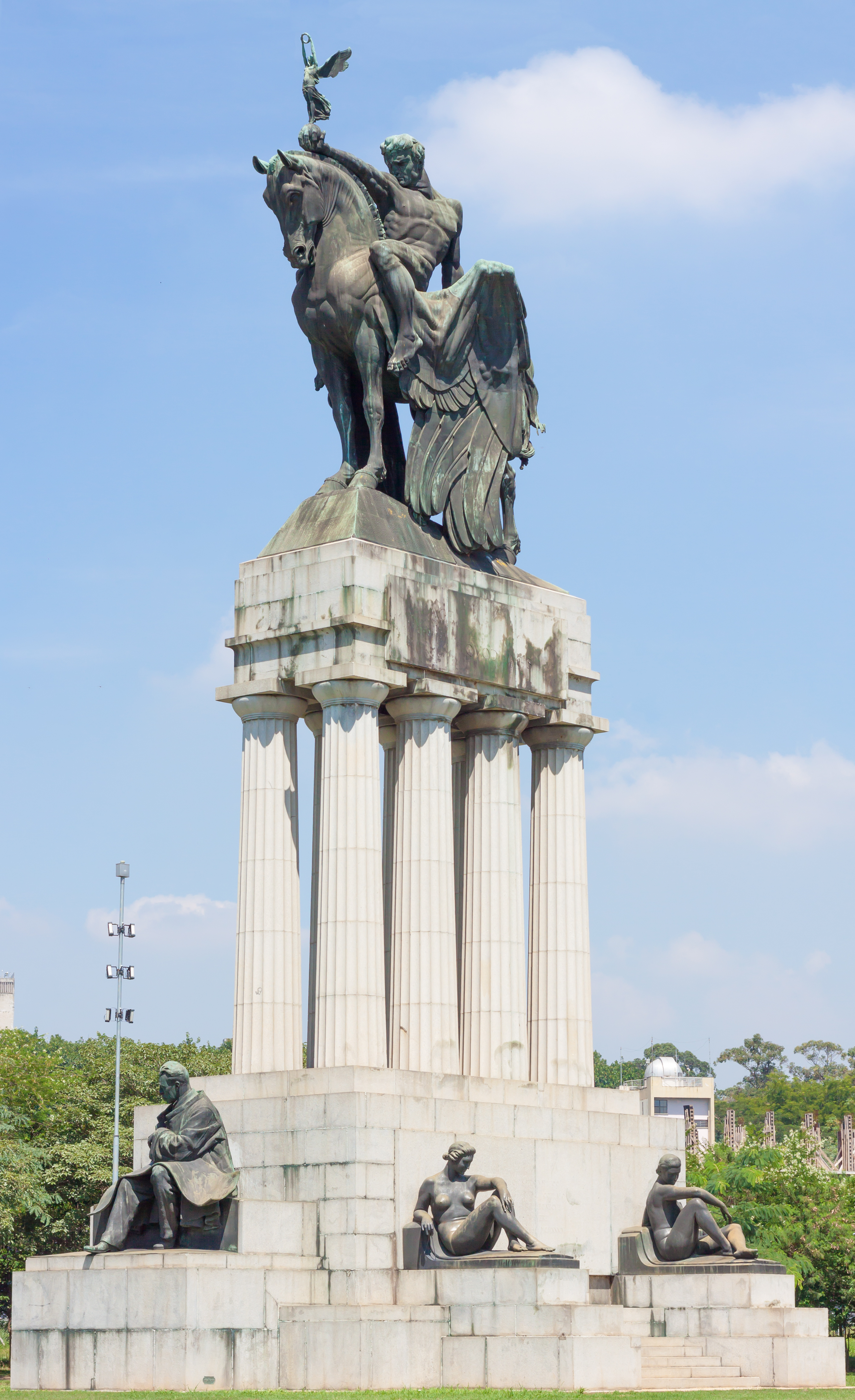
- Interactive map of Monument to Ramos de Azevedo
- Location: São Paulo, Brazil
- Coordinates: 23°33′25″S 46°44′03″W
- Designer: Galileo Emendabili
- Beginning date: 1929
- Opening date: 25 January 1934
- Dedicated to: Ramos de Azevedo

The Monument to Ramos de Azevedo is a sculptural set in bronze and granite located in the city of São Paulo. It was designed by Italian-born Brazilian sculptor Galileo Emendabili as a posthumous tribute to Francisco de Paula Ramos de Azevedo, one of the most prominent names in architecture and urbanism in São Paulo. Azevedo died on 12 June 1928 and the monument in his honor, chosen through a competition, was inaugurated on 25 January 1934, the city's anniversary. Originally located on Tiradentes Avenue, in front of the Pinacoteca do Estado building - an important work by Azevedo himself - it was dismantled in 1967, due to the construction of São Paulo's metro, and then transferred to the Cidade Universitária Armando de Salles Oliveira in 1973, where it remains until today, in the square that bears Azevedo's name, next to the Polytechnic School, an institution he helped to create. Construction of the monument began in 1929 and was finished six years later.

== Ramos de Azevedo ==
Francisco de Paula Ramos de Azevedo (1851-1928) was a famous architect born in Campinas, São Paulo. He was the designer of several public and private buildings in São Paulo. He studied civil engineering and soon afterwards engineering and architecture at the École Spéciale du Génie Civil et des Arts et Manufactures at the University of Ghent in Belgium. Azevedo was creative and surrounded himself with freedom for the execution of each project, his architectural style was the eclecticism, in which he was representative. Ramos was a pioneer and responsible for the new urban form of São Paulo, moving away from colonial building parameters, bringing a new concept of construction techniques.

After his death in June 1928, a committee was created that aimed to recognize his memory and importance for the city of São Paulo. It was at this time that a competition was held to evaluate and choose the best project to honor Ramos and the commemoration intentions that had historical and social relevance. It was from this competition that the project by the Italian-born Brazilian artist Galileo Emendabili was chosen.

Azevedo moved to São Paulo at the end of the 19th century, starting to design residences for the city's elite. In a short time, he became the main influencer of local architecture, getting involved in discussions and urban and educational projects, which began an accelerated process of economic and population growth.

He was the first director of the São Paulo School of Arts and Crafts and the Pinacoteca do Estado, for which he designed a grandiose building in Jardim da Luz. Azevedo participated in the founding of the Polytechnic School and its Technological Laboratory, currently the Institute for Technological Research, and created its first buildings (current headquarters of the Washington Luís Municipal Historical Archive). He also designed the Municipal Theater, the Municipal Market of São Paulo, the Industries Palace, the Justice Palace, the Postal Office building, the Sion School, among other buildings.

== Galileo Emendabili ==
Emendabili was born in the city of Ancona, Italy in 1898. He became one of the greatest sculptors of his time. His career in the arts began in 1915, when he enrolled in a course specializing in sculpture at the Royal Academy of Fine Arts in Urbino, Italy. He designed his first monument in 1921. His coming to Brazil took place in 1923, settling in the city of São Paulo; later he began to work as a woodcarver at the São Paulo School of Arts and Crafts.

His first recognition on Brazilian soil happened when he won 1st prize in the International Competition for the Monument to Pereira Barreto, inaugurated in 1928, in Marechal Deodoro Square. However, it was only in 1934 that he consecrated himself and executed his most famous work, the Monument to the Constitutionalist Heroes, popularly known as Ibirapuera Obelisk or São Paulo Obelisk, it is a funerary monument, one of Emendabili's specialties.

Another famous Monument conceived and executed by Emendabili was the Monument to Ramos de Azevedo, inaugurated in 1934. One of his main works. His project won him awards. His works can also be seen in mausoleums in several cemeteries in São Paulo.

== The monument ==
=== History ===
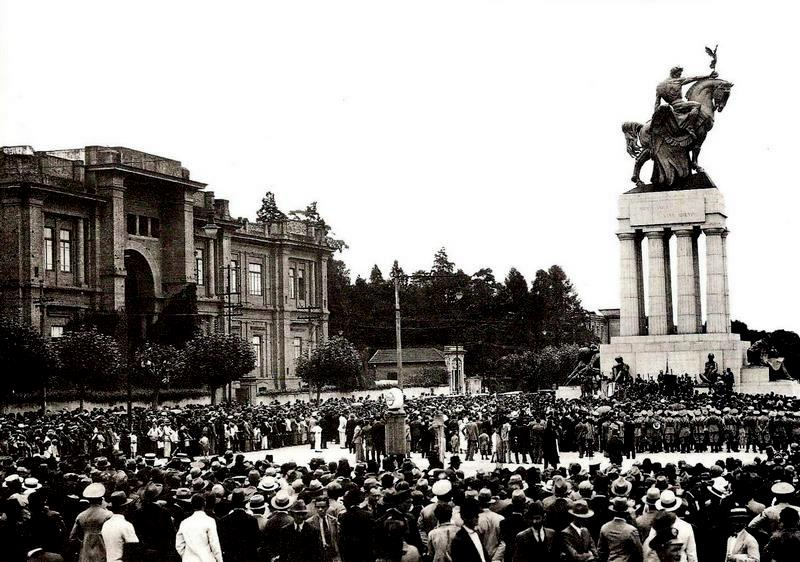
The monument's inauguration on 25 January 1934

After Ramos de Azevedo's death, on 1 June 1928, numerous tributes and honors made in his honor. Shortly after his death, a competition was held by civil society to create a monument in his memory. The chosen project was the one presented by Galileo Emendabili, approved by the judging committee with some modifications. Living in São Paulo since 1923, Emendabili quickly became part of the São Paulo's art scene, winning several competitions for the construction of monuments in the city, the most famous being the São Paulo Obelisk.

To finance the construction of the monument, a fund was created to collect donations, reaching an amount of 1,005 contos of réis, a very significant amount for the time. Granite was used in the construction of the pedestal and the rows of Doric columns. The casting of the bronze sculptural groups, designed by Emendabili, was in charge of Giuseppe Rebellato. The construction was probably entirely carried out in the workshops of the São Paulo School of Arts and Crafts. After six years of construction, the monument was inaugurated on 25 January 1934, the city's anniversary. The opening speech was given by Luís Inácio de Anhaia Melo, who summarized the importance of the architect as follows:

Ramos de Azevedo was the center around which the architectural renaissance of the city of São Paulo gravitated.

At first it was located in front of the building of the São Paulo School of Arts and Crafts (current the Pinacoteca do Estado), on Tiradentes Avenue, but was later dismantled and removed from the site in 1967, under much criticism, due to the works for the construction of the metro system. It was transferred to Cidade Universitária and reopened in 1973, close to the Biennium building of the Polytechnic School, where it remains today. It underwent a renovation in 1999.

=== Description ===
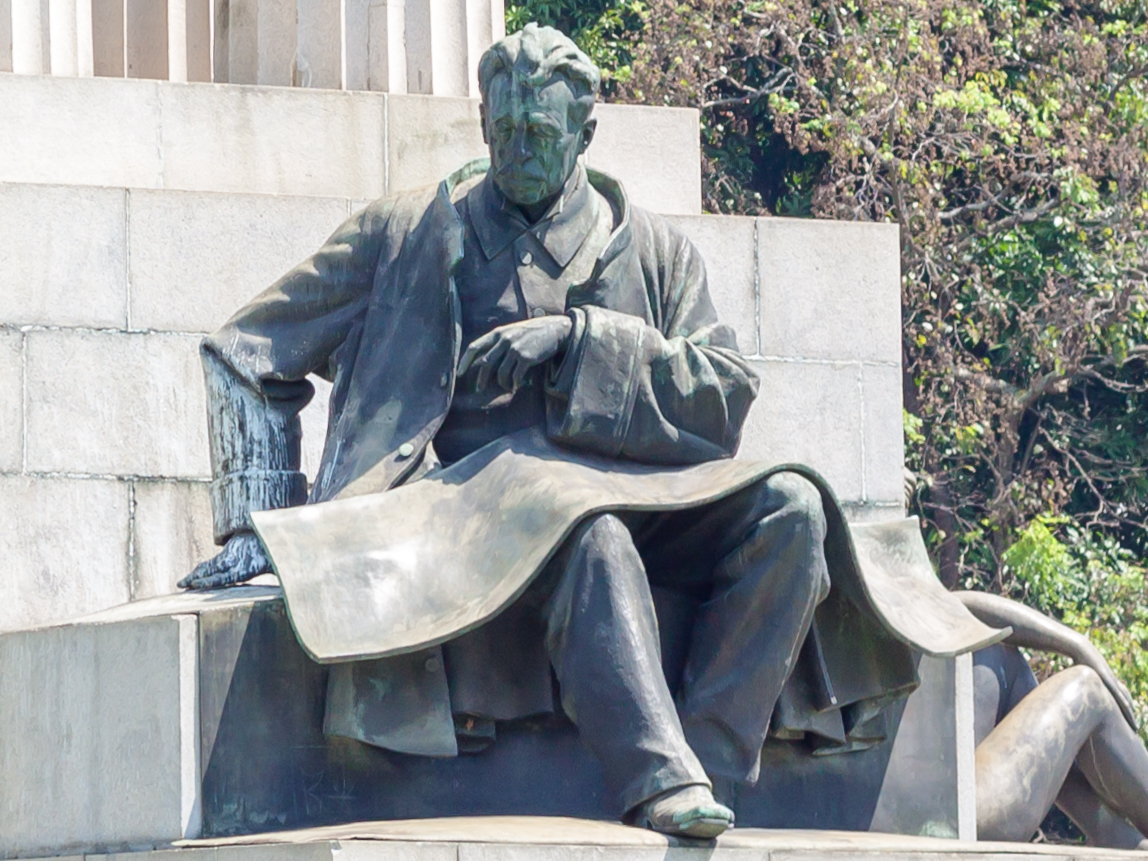
Ramos de Azevedo bronze statue

A sculptural set of large proportions, all made of Itaquera granite and bronze, the Monument to Ramos de Azevedo is composed of a large rectangular base, measuring 15.5m long by 13m wide and 5.6m high. On this base are two rows of Doric columns, both supporting an architrave on which the figure with the winged horse is supported at the top. The total height of the monument is 23.7m, weighing a total of 22 tons.

The bronze figure at the top of the monument is an allegory of progress. It represents the figure of the Genie, mounted on a winged horse, and in whose hand the goddess Nike, personification of Victory, rests. Giuseppe Rebellato was responsible for the casting work of the bronze sculptures, who was the most skilled artistic foundry artist in Brazil.

The artist also conceived the figure of Ramos de Azevedo, modeling and composing the whole work. Azevedo is seated and seems to be observing his projects, in his hands he has blueprints.

==== The muses ====
They are present in the work in pairs, arranged on the two largest sides of the monument. The Muses exude sensuality and femininity, their skins are made of bronze, visible and impressive to visitors. Each Muse represents Ramos de Azevedo's inspiration in Engineering, Painting, Sculpture and Architecture.

==== The builders ====
The builders have movement and virility, contrasting with the "Muses", which are delicate and sensitive. The figure of the builders is defined with muscle bundles, which reveal the strength of work, knowledge and creation. This allegorical representation of the work makes reference to the progress next to the coat of arms of São Paulo.

== Transfer ==
Weighing 22 tons, the Monument to Ramos de Azevedo was transferred from Tiradentes Avenue, in front of the São Paulo School of Arts and Crafts, currently the Pinacoteca. The huge sculpture was close to the buildings conceived and executed by Ramos de Azevedo, but with the creation of the north–south axis of the city's metro, the monument ended up between the path, disturbing the work of connection between the avenue and the Anhangabaú Valley.

After discussions and criticism the monument was dismantled, however discussions began on where the sculpture would be installed. At the time, it was considered to install the monument in Jardim da Luz, close to the square where the Ramos de Azevedo Building is located. In 1972, the city government decided that it would be assembled in the Cidade Universitária, however, just eight years after it was dismantled, the sculpture was assembled at the University of São Paulo, close to the Polytechnic School, a school in which Ramos de Azevedo was one of the founders. The monument spent several years dismantled in pieces in Jardim da Luz.

During the metro's expansion works, the monument was not the only one that was in the middle of city traffic. The monument to José Bonifácio the Younger also needed to be dismantled, but it was not entirely rebuilt and only the statue of the honoree remained from the sculpture, which can be found today at the entrance to the Faculty of Law.

The main criticisms about the transfer were that the monument was installed in a place of little visibility and far from the historical context. It could also suffer damage as it is a rare and heavy structure.

== Conservation ==
The Monument to Ramos de Azevedo was exposed to the weather for a long period, being subject to deterioration mainly in the years when it was dismantled and left abandoned in Jardim da Luz. It undergone some analysis so that it was possible to identify in what state of conservation it was after its reassembly and recovery in the Cidade Universitária. At the end of the tests the results obtained made it possible to conclude that, despite being currently dirty and yellowed, the monument is in a good state of conservation.

== Gallery ==
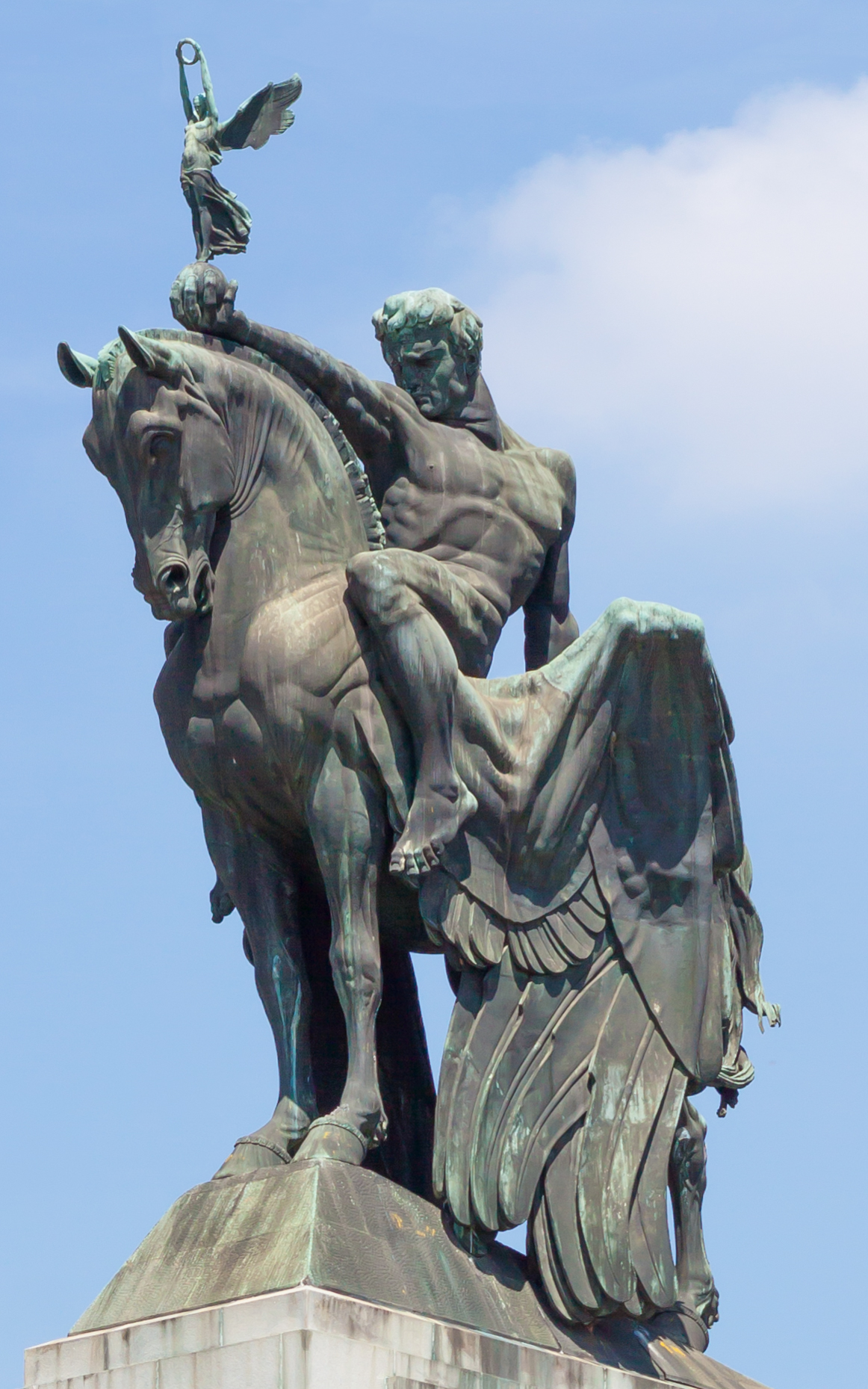
The allegorical figure

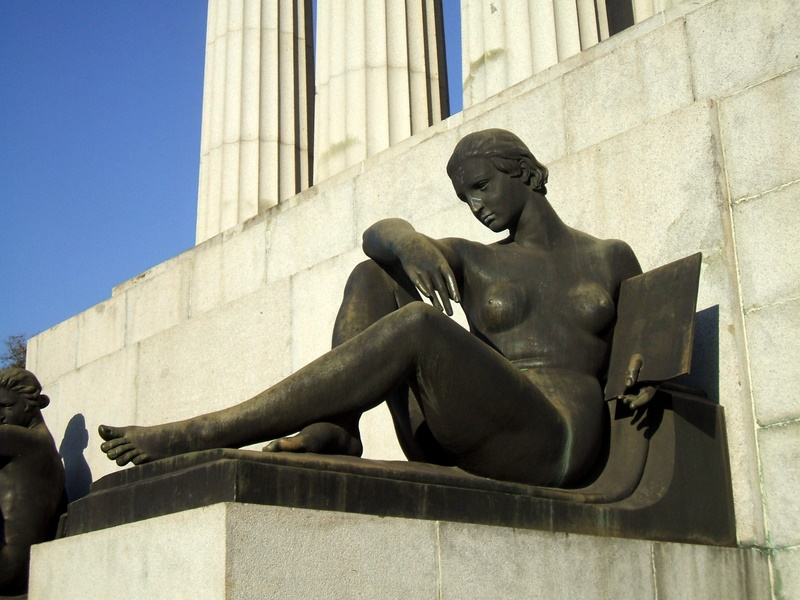
Muse

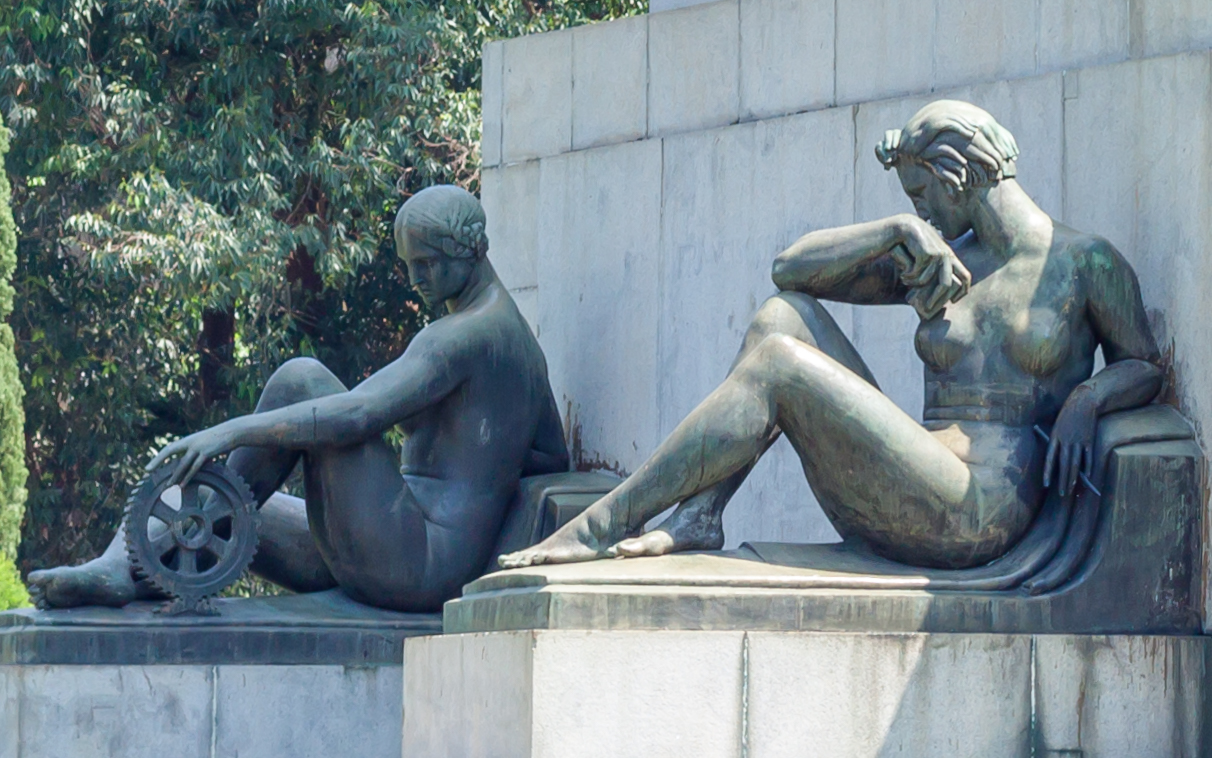
Muses

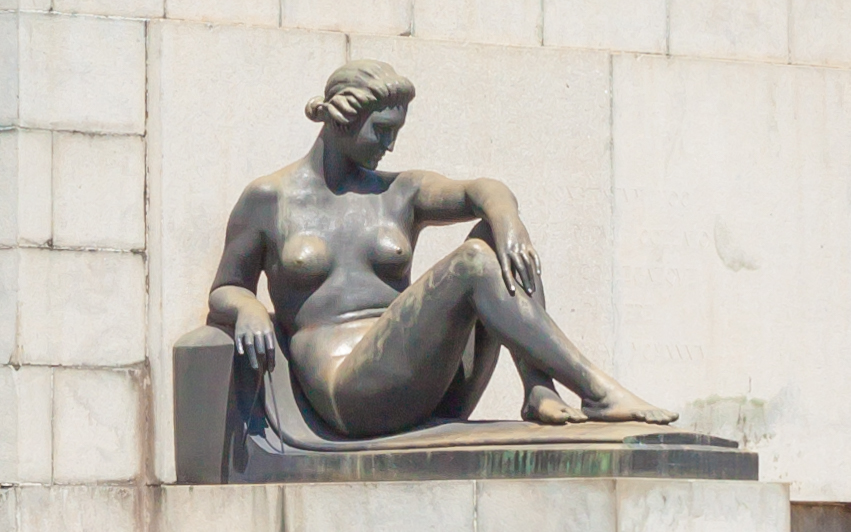
Muse

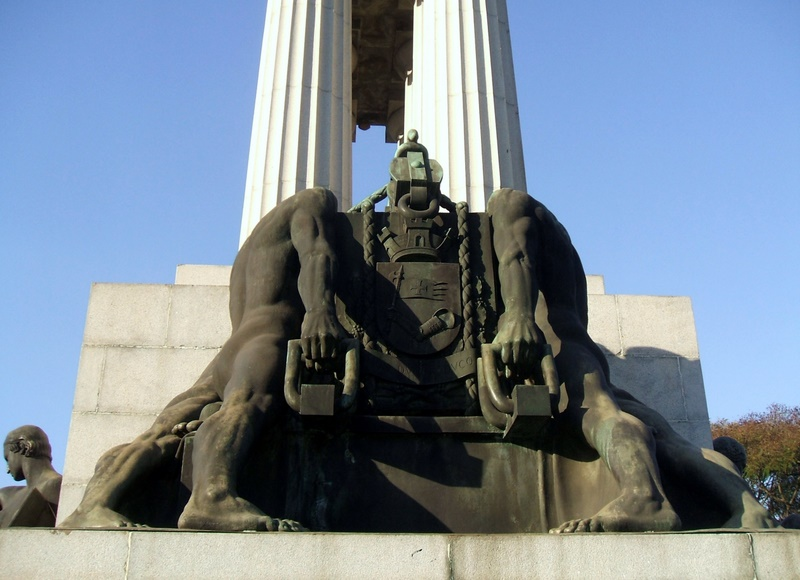
The builders

== See also ==
- Brazilian sculpture
