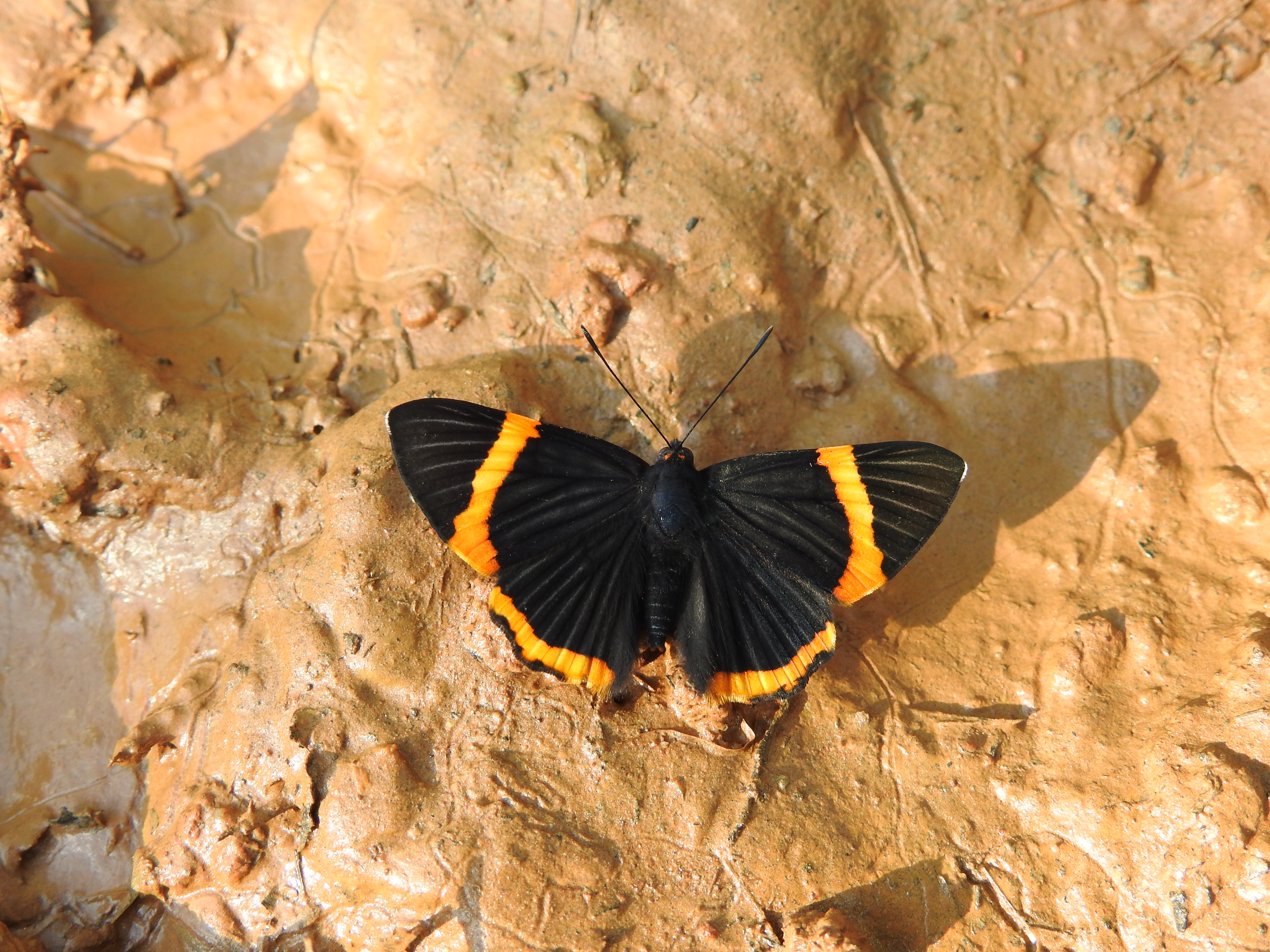
- In the Juqueri State Park, Brazil

Scientific classification
- Kingdom: Animalia
- Phylum: Arthropoda
- Class: Insecta
- Order: Lepidoptera
- Family: Riodinidae
- Genus: Riodina
- Species: R. lycisca

Binomial name
- Riodina lycisca (Hewitson, [1853])

Synonyms
- Riodina infirmata Stichel, 1910; Riodina refracta Stichel, 1910

= Riodina lycisca =

Species of butterfly

Riodina lycisca is a species of Neotropical metalmark butterfly. It is found in south Brazil, Argentina and Paraguay.

Males of this species are found with the wings open in humid soils, around lakes and rivers. While females are found in plants and samall bushes.

== Subspecies ==
- Riodina lycisca lycisca (Hewitson, 1853)
- Riodina lycisca lysistratus Burmeister, 1878
- Riodina lycisca pelta (Schaus, 1902)
