= Jardim da Luz =

Park in São Paulo

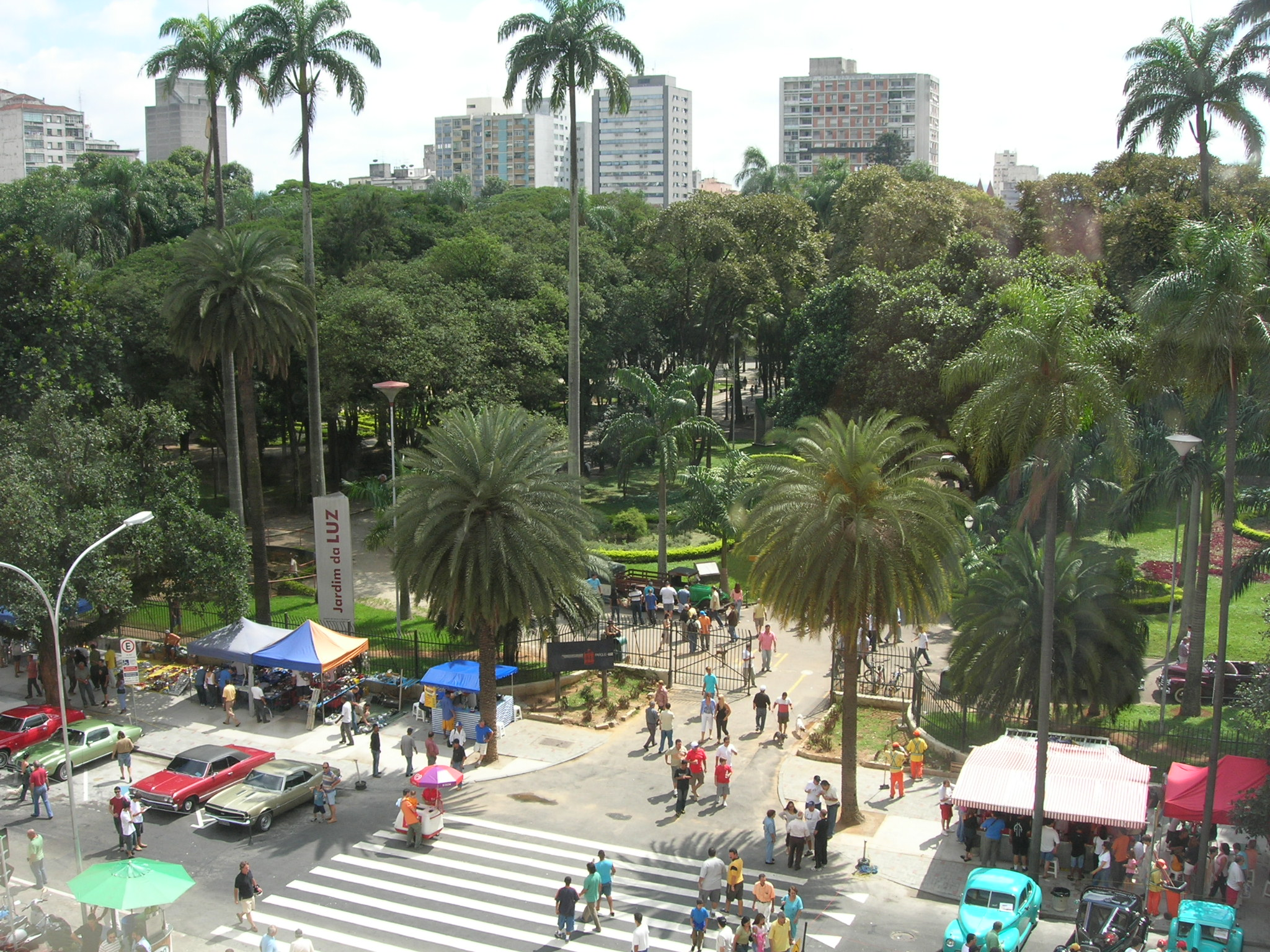
- Image of Praça da Luz in 2006, taken from the third floor of the Museum of the Portuguese Language

- Location within São Paulo Location within Brazil
- Location: São Paulo, Brazil
- Coordinates: 23.533°S 46.635°W
- Area: 2 ha (4.9 acres)

Jardim da Luz (also: Praça da Luz or Parque da Luz) is a public park near the Luz station and Avenida Tiradentes in the Bom Retiro district of São Paulo. The headquarters of the Pinacoteca do Estado de São Paulo is located in the southeastern corner of the park.

== History ==
Originally created in 1798 as a botanical garden, the garden was transformed into a public park only in 1938, initially only serving as a big pasture for cattle and cows.

In 1900 was inaugurated the headquarters of Liceu de Artes e Ofícios de São Paulo, a building that nowadays holds the Pinacoteca do Estado.

During a big part of the 20th century, Jardim da Luz passed through a period of severe degradation, serving as a zone of prostitution and drug trafficking. The state government has since revitalized the central region of the city through a series of reforms, including installation of sculptures in the park, a remodel of the Pinacoteca do Estado, and increased police supervision of the area.

== Sculptures ==
Image	Name	Creator	Year	Material	Category on Commons	Monument identifier	Sculpture identifier
	Botão de Rosa, Carneiro, Cisne, Flor Redonda, Papoula, Pássaro Imaginário e Tulipa	Odette Eid		aluminum	Botão de Rosa, Carneiro, Cisne, Flor Redonda, Papoula, Pássaro Imaginário e Tulipa		
	Carregadora de Perfume	Victor Brecheret	1998	bronze	Carregadora de Perfume		
	Chafariz (Delfins)			marble	Chafariz (Delfins)		
	Colar	Lygia Reinach	2000	ceramic	Colar (Jardim da Luz)		
	Craca	Nuno Ramos			Craca (Jardim da Luz)		
	Diana			bronze	Diana (Jardim da Luz)		
	Encounter and mismatch	Arcangelo Ianelli	2002	marble	Encontro e Desencontro		
	Escultura 1			marble masonry			
	Escultura 2			marble masonry			
	Escultura 3			marble masonry			
	Escultura 4			marble masonry			
	Escultura Lúdica	León Ferrari		steel wood			
	Espaço vibração	Yutaka Toyota		steel concrete	Espaço Vibração		
	Figura Heráldica	Liuba Wolf		bronze	Figura Heráldica (Jardim da Luz)		
	Fita amarela	Franz Weissmann		iron			
	Fita vermelha	Franz Weissmann		iron	Fita Vermelha (Jardim da Luz)		
	Fóssil	Sonia von Brüsky		granite	Fóssil (Jardim da Luz)		
	Garfo	Ana Maria Tavares		steel polyurethane			
	Homem Pássaro	Nicolas Vlavianos		steel	Homem Pássaro (Jardim da Luz)		
	Impossível	Maria Martins		bronze			
	In search of light	Maria Martins		bronze	À Procura da Luz		
	Luíza	Sonia Ebling		bronze	Luiza (Jardim da Luz)		
	Moça no espelho	Bruno Giorgi		bronze			
	Monument to Giuseppe Garibaldi	Emilio Gallori	1910-05-01	bronze granite	Monument to Giuseppe Garibaldi (São Paulo)		
	OC	Caciporé Torres		steel	OC (Jardim da Luz)		
	Oração	Karoly Pichler		iron	Oração (Jardim da Luz)		
	Passado Presente Pietá	Nair Kremer	1984	steel neon lamp	Passado Presente Pietá		
	Pincelada Tridimensional	Marcello Nitsche		iron polyurethane	Pincelada Tridimensional		
	Piramidal 34	Ascânio MMM		aluminum	Piramidal 34		
	Placa Marco			granite	Placa Marco		
	Planta	Nicolas Vlavianos		steel			
	Sem título (Amilcar de Castro - Parque da Luz)	Amílcar de Castro		steel	Sem título (Amilcar de Castro/Jardim da Luz) 02		
	Sem título (Amilcar de Castro/Pq da Luz)	Amílcar de Castro		steel	Sem título (Amilcar de Castro/Jardim da Luz) 01		
	Sem Título (Angelo Venosa)	Angelo Venosa		steel	Sem título (Ângelo Venosa)		
	Sem título (Arthur Lescher)	Artur Lescher		steel	Sem título (Artur Lescher)		
	Sem título (Caíto)	Caíto		steel	Sem título (Caíto/Jardim da Luz)		
	Sem título (Carlito Carvalhosa)	Carlito Carvalhosa		cement	Sem título (Carlito Carvalhosa)		
	Sem Título (Elisa Bracher)	Elisa Bracher		wood	Sem título (Elisa Bracher/Jardim da Luz)		
	Sem título (Ivens Machado)	Ivens Machado		reinforced concrete	Sem título (Ivens Machado/Jardim da Luz)		
	Sem título (José Bento)	José Bento		wood			
	Sem título (José Resende/Pq da Luz)	José Resende		weathering steel granite steel	Sem título (José Resende/Jardim da Luz)		
	Sem título (Macaparama)	José de Souza Oliveira Filho		steel	Sem título (Macaparama)		
	Sem título (Marcelo Silveira)	Marcelo Silveira		wood aluminum	Sem título (Marcelo Silveira)		
	Sem título (Sérvulo Esmeraldo)	Sérvulo Esmeraldo		steel	Sem título (Sérvulo Esmeraldo)		
	The Boy and the Fish	G. Giorgio Filho		marble	O Menino e o Peixe		
	The Twinkling Forest (Floresta Cintilante)	Nobuo Mitsunashi		ceramic glass fiber wood lead	The Twinkling Forest		
	Três Jovens	Lasar Segall		bronze	Três Jovens		
	Vôo do Pássaro	Liuba Wolf		bronze	Vôo do Pássaro		
