= Baltazar Fidélis (CPTM) =

Railway station in São Paulo, Brazil

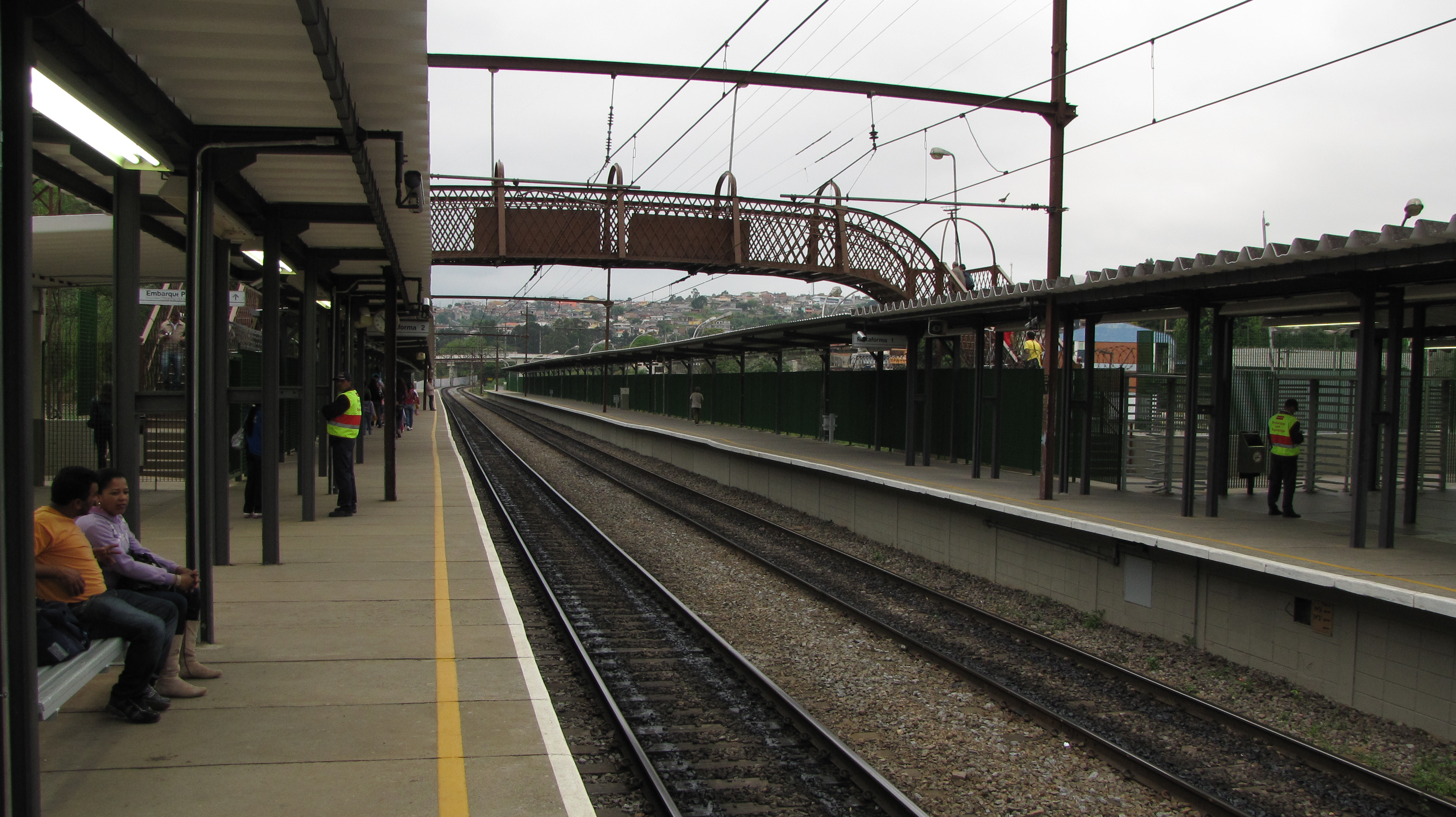

General information
- Location: Av. Israel, s/n Vila Bela; Brazil
- Coordinates: 23.309582°S 46.723269°W
- Owner: Government of the State of São Paulo
- Operator: TIC Trens (Grupo Comporte)
- Platforms: Side platforms

Construction
- Structure type: At-grade

Other information
- Station code: BFI

History
- Opened: 1 September 1955
- Closed: 18 October 1996
- Rebuilt: 30 April 1997
- Former names: Parada Km 113

Services
Preceding station	São Paulo Metropolitan Trains	Following station
Francisco Morato towards Jundiaí	Line 7	Franco da Rocha towards Palmeiras-Barra Funda
Track layout
Location

Baltazar Fidélis is a train station on TIC Trens Line 7-Ruby, located in the district of Vila Bela in Franco da Rocha.

== History ==
With the growth of Francisco Morato, Santos-Jundiaí Railway (EFSJ) built Parada Km 113, opened on 1 September 1955, constituted of a simple appearance without cover, with the capacity to attend one car and a half of the railway and with determined times only. In the 1960s and 1970s, it was renamed to Baltazar Fidélis. In 1974, the residents of the station surroundings and passenger of "Paradinha" (as it was popularly known) were complaining about its conditions:

The residents lament that the station is dirty and poorly conservated, besides don't having a cover against rain or sun. [...] The residents asked the superintendent of RFFSA to do an inspection in the "Baltazar Fidélis" stop [...]

— Part of a letter sent to Folha de S. Paulo, 24 June 1974

However, in 1985 the stop was promoted to station and received improvements with the stretching of the platforms and the construction of a new building for the station. Since 1 June 1994, the station has been operated by CPTM. During the 1996 CPTM riots, Baltazar Fidélis was one of the seven severely damaged stations, resulting in its closing for emergency repairs for 6 months.

=== Project ===
At the end of 2004, CPTM published the bidding no. 8292402011, with the objective to make architectural and engineering projects to subsidize the reform/rebuild of 39 stations, divided in 10 allotments. Baltazar Fidélis was in allotment 1, along with Piqueri, Pirituba, Perus and Caieiras. On 12 April 2005, the bidding had its result homologated. Allotment 1 was won by a consortium formed by Figueiro Ferraz/Toscano companies, by the cost of R$ 1,040,439.58 (US$ 356,270.63).

Besides being concluded in 2007, the projects for Baltazar Fidélis were never executed. A second try to relaunch them was made in 2012, with bidding no. 8616110011, which objective was to update the projects made between 2005 and 2007 for Baltazar Fidélis and Pirituba. The Herjacktech-Geométrica-III consortium won the bidding, by the cost of R$4,202,139.03 (US$ 2,151,557.3) in June 2012 and subhired ASL e Associados company to construct the new architectural project. It was concluded in 2015, but the works were not executed because of the cancelling of the financing obtained through the Growth Acceleration Program (PAC), due to the 2014 Brazilian economic crisis.

== Toponymy ==
Parada Km 113 was renamed Baltazar Fidélis as a tribute to Antônio Baltazar Fidélis, São Paulo Railway traffic supervisor and minority shareholder of São Paulo Railways Company.
