= Franco da Rocha Railway Station Complex =

- Conjunto da Estação Ferroviária de Franco da Rocha
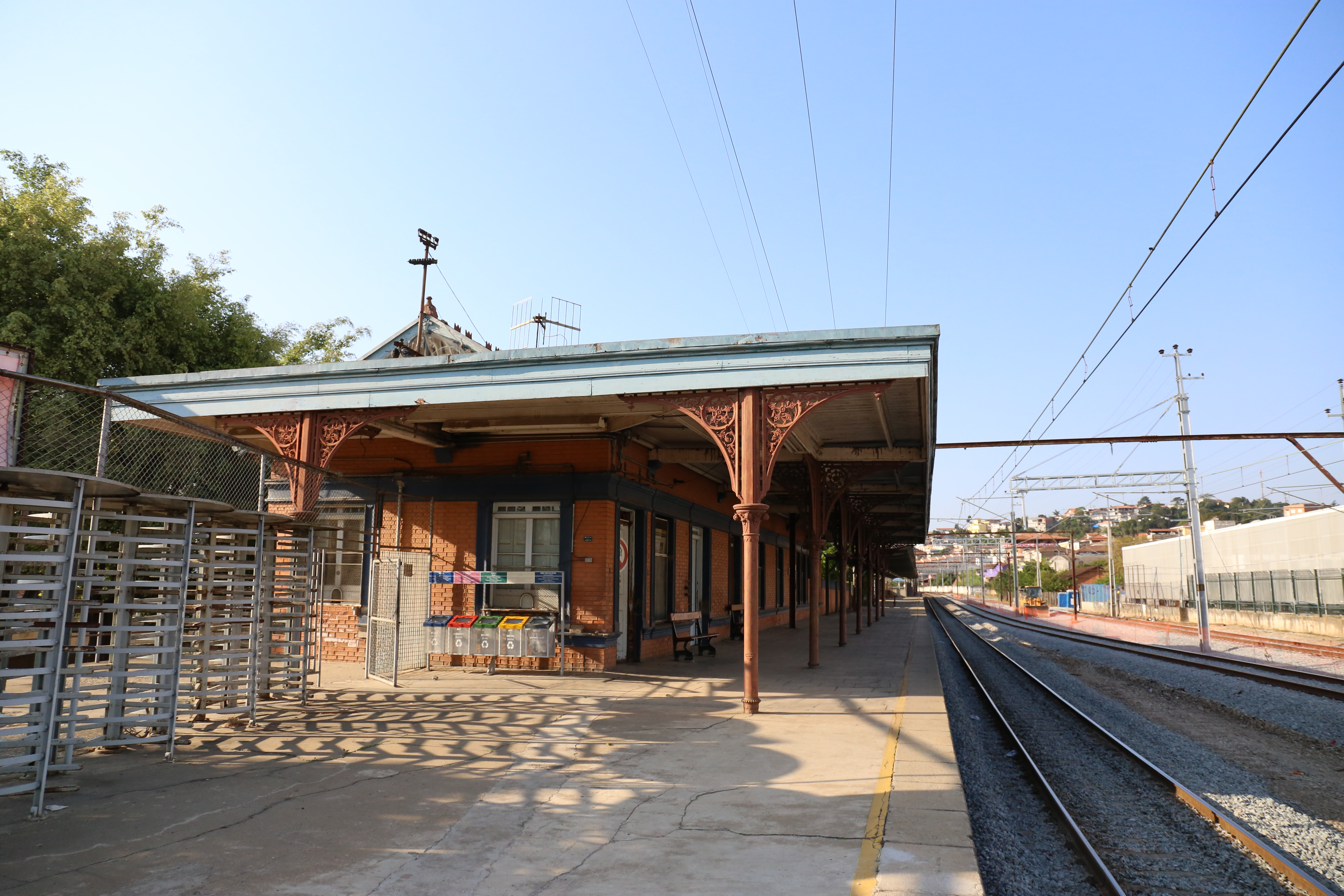

General information
- Status: Completed
- Location: Azevedo Soares street, Ângelo Sestini Avenue, Vila Ferroviária, Franco da Rocha, Brazil
- Inaugurated: 1888
- Owner: CONDEPHAAT

Franco da Rocha Railway Station Complex (in Portuguese: Conjunto da Estação Ferroviária de Franco da Rocha) is a historical monument in the city of Franco da Rocha, in São Paulo, Brazil. It is based on the former Franco da Rocha railway station complex, inaugurated under the name of Juquery on 1 February 1888 by the British São Paulo Railway Company.

When it was inaugurated, the purpose of the station was to connect the population of the Parnahyba village to the metropolis, and to serve as a passage for production from the interior to the coast of São Paulo. In 1934, it was transferred to the municipality of Juquery, and in 1944, to the municipality of Franco da Rocha. In 2011, with the construction of the new Franco da Rocha Station underway during the municipal administration of Mayor Marcio Cecchettini, the old station was listed by the Council for the Defense of Historical, Archaeological, Artistic and Tourist Heritage (CONDEPHAAT), with the aim of preserving and enhancing it as a cultural heritage site in São Paulo. The monument's architectural typologies reflect the approach adopted by the English in the first railway constructions in São Paulo, with the introduction of new techniques such as brick masonry and cast iron.
