= Franco da Rocha (CPTM) =

Railway station in São Paulo, Brazil

Coordinates: 23.3297°S 46.7264°W

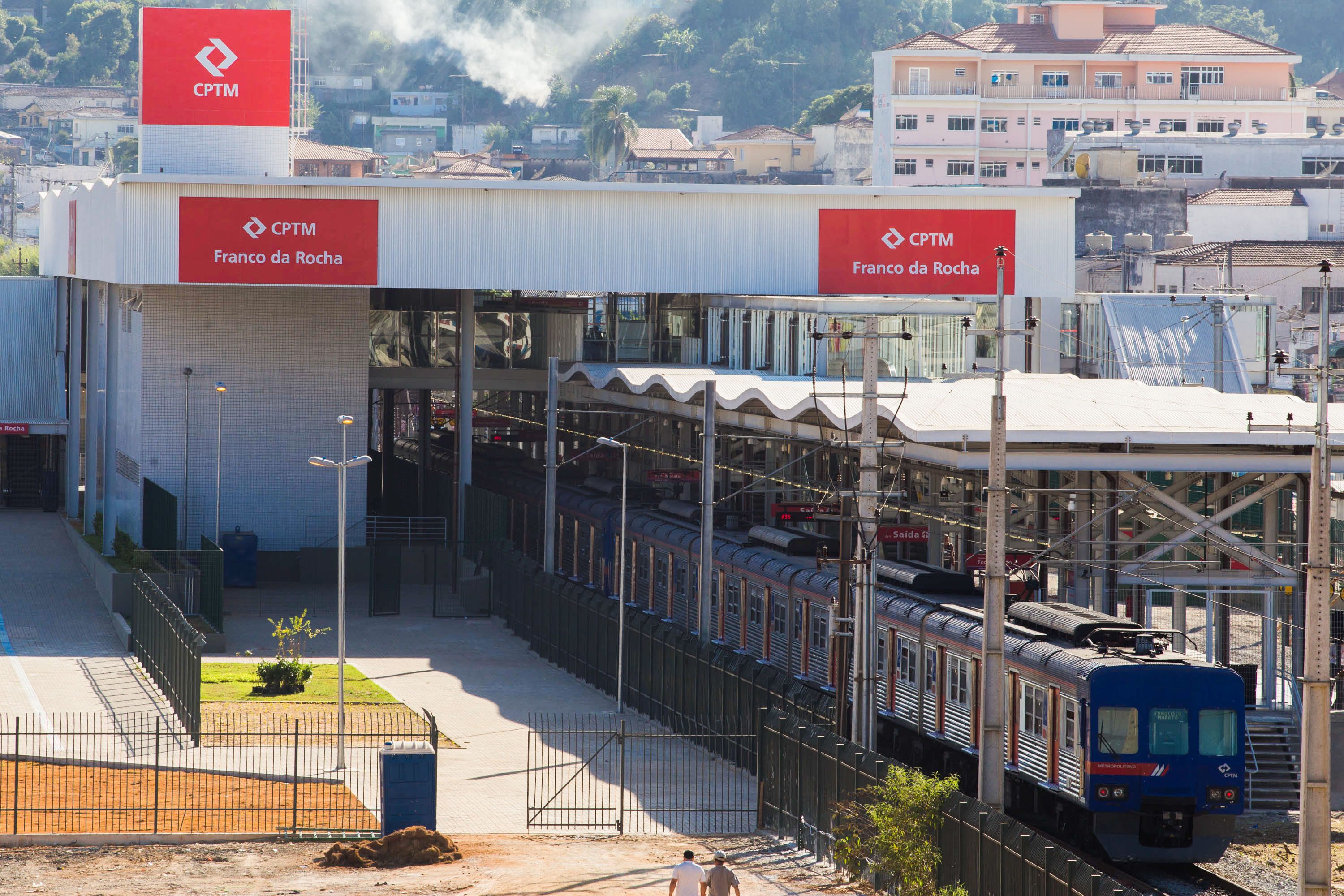
- TUE Mafersa Hitachi 1700 leaving Franco da Rocha station towards Francisco Morato.

General information
- Location: R. Cavalheiro Ângelo Sestini, 200; Vila Artur Sestini; Brazil
- Owner: Government of the State of São Paulo
- Operator: TIC Trens (Grupo Comporte)
- Platforms: Island platform
- Connections: East Franco da Rocha Bus Terminal; West Franco da Rocha Bus Terminal

Construction
- Structure type: At-grade

Other information
- Station code: FDR

History
- Opened: 1 February 1888
- Rebuilt: 10 May 2014
- Former names: Juquery

Services
| Preceding station | São Paulo Metropolitan Trains | Following station |
|---|---|---|
| Baltazar Fidélis towards Jundiaí | Line 7 | Caieiras towards Palmeiras-Barra Funda |
Track layout
Location

Franco da Rocha is a train station on TIC Trens Line 7-Ruby, located in Franco da Rocha.

== History ==
The original station was opened by São Paulo Railway on 1 February 1888, named Juquery. Years later, it was renamed after Francisco Franco da Rocha, doctor responsible for the opening of Juqueri hospital complex.

The new building is contemporary and adapted to people with disabilities, with tactile floor, adapted restrooms for wheelchairs, elevators and escalators.
