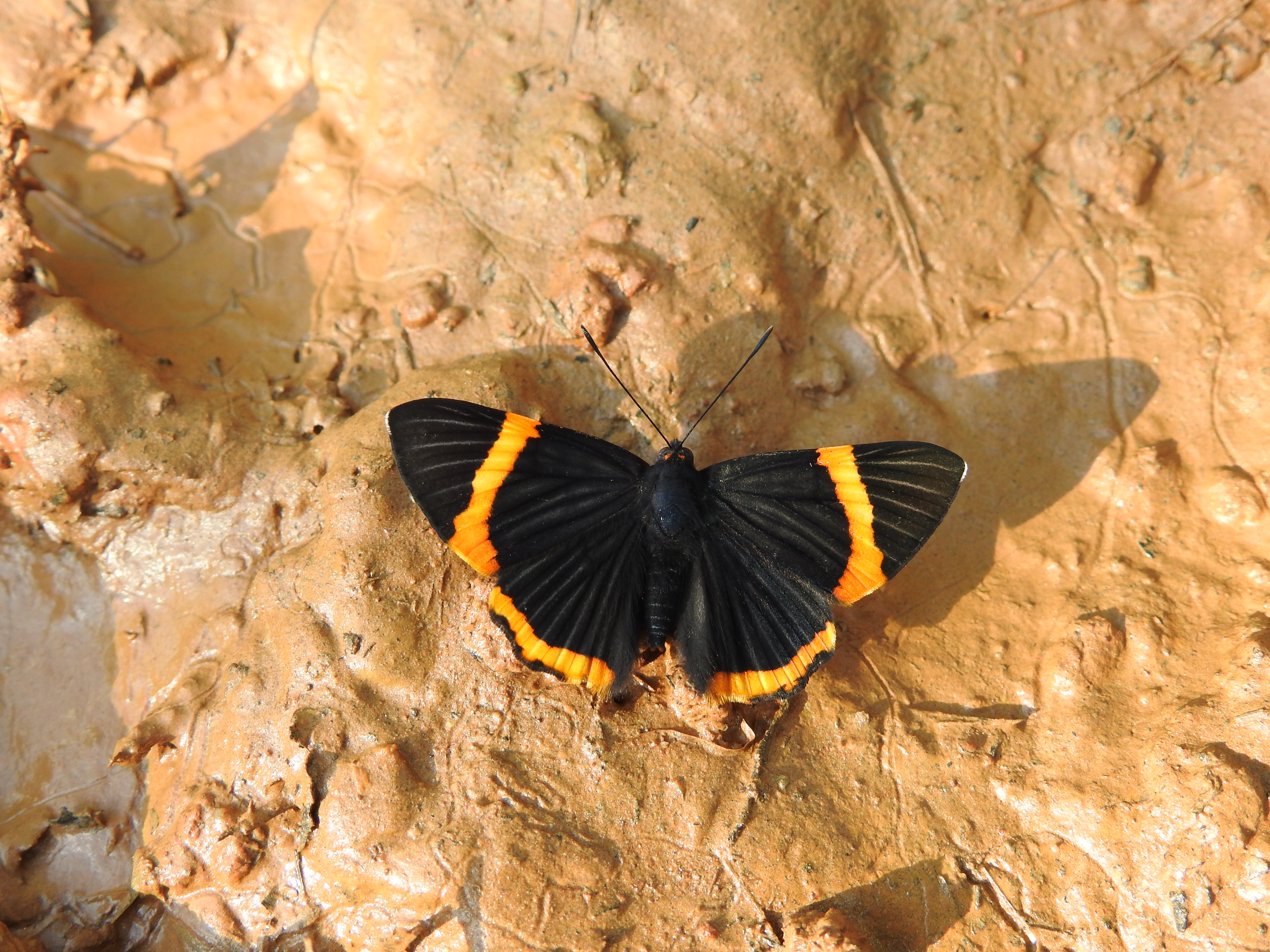
- Riodina lycisca

Scientific classification
- Domain: Eukaryota
- Kingdom: Animalia
- Phylum: Arthropoda
- Class: Insecta
- Order: Lepidoptera
- Family: Riodinidae
- Tribe: Riodinini
- Genus: Riodina; Westwood, 1851

= Riodina =

Genus of insects

Riodina is a Neotropical metalmark butterfly genus.

These butterflies are dark brown or black with white, yellow, or orange bars on both forewings and hindwings.

== Species ==
Listed alphabetically:

- Riodina lycisca (Hewitson, [1853])
- Riodina lysippoides Berg, 1882
- Riodina lysippus (Linnaeus, 1758)
