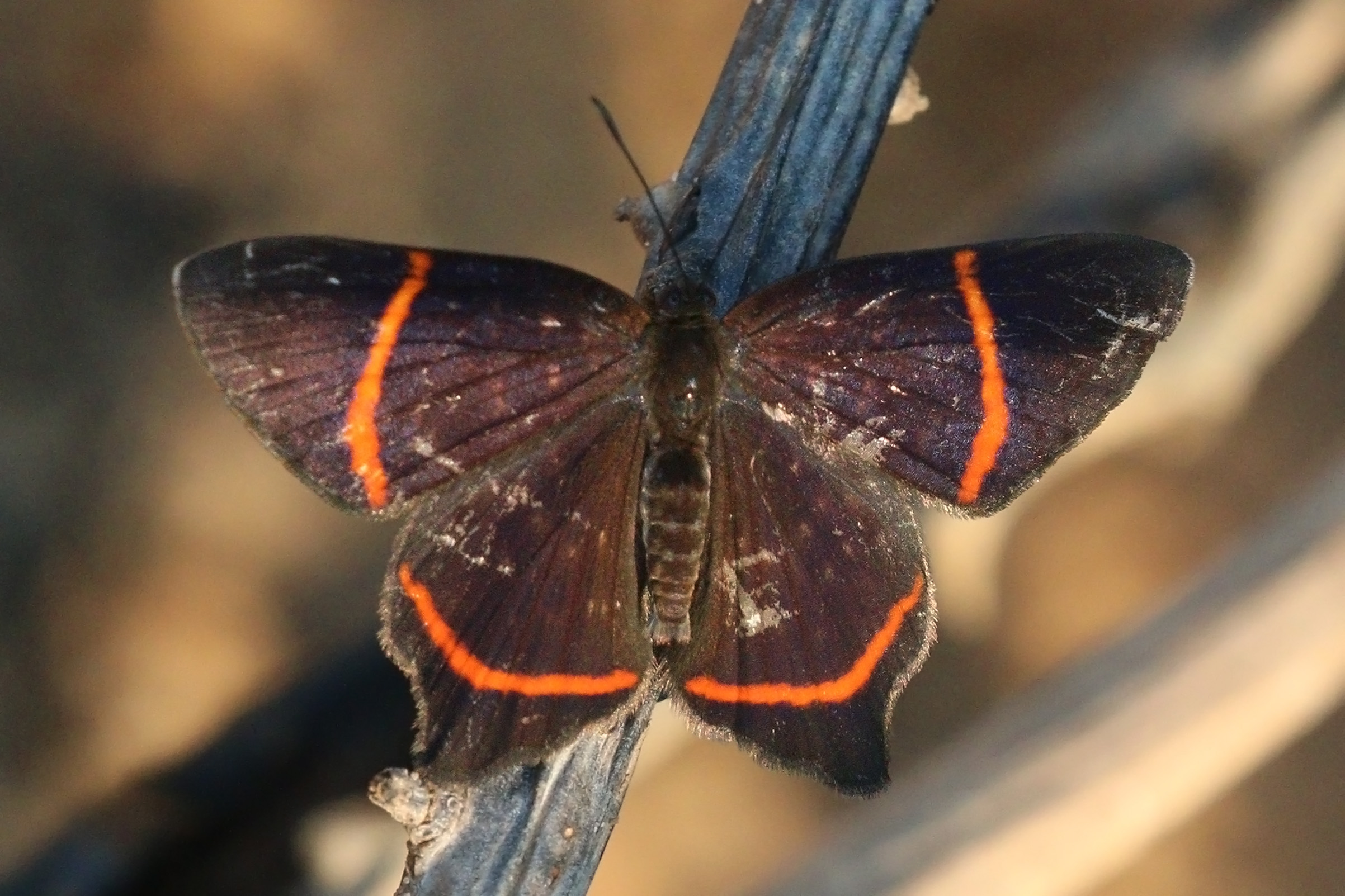
- In the Pantanal, Brazil

Scientific classification
- Kingdom: Animalia
- Phylum: Arthropoda
- Class: Insecta
- Order: Lepidoptera
- Family: Riodinidae
- Genus: Riodina
- Species: R. lysippus

Binomial name
- Riodina lysippus (Linnaeus, 1758)

Synonyms
- Papilio lysippus Linnaeus, 1758; Erycina lysippus (Linnaeus), 1758; Erycina lysippe Hübner, [1819]; Riodina negrita Seitz, 1913

= Riodina lysippus =

Species of butterfly

Riodina lysippus is a species of Neotropical metalmark butterfly. It is the type species of its genus and of the entire family Riodinidae. It is found throughout northern parts of South America and the Caribbean.

== Description ==
Upperside. The wings are chocolate black. On the anterior is an orange-coloured line, which, rising about the middle of the anterior edge, crosses the wing towards the anal angle, where it suddenly bends, and terminates at the posterior edge. The posterior wings, which are angulated, have a circular orange line, rising at the anterior edge, near the corner, crossing the wings, and meeting near the anal angle.

Underside. The wings are of the same colour as on the upperside, with the same orange line, whereon, in the anterior pair, are some white spots. Between this and the base are several faint, dirty grey, oblong spots, namely, four on the anterior, and about twenty on the posterior wing. The base of the anterior margin of the fore wings, and the anal margin of the posterior wings, are of a red colour.

== Subspecies ==
- Riodina lysippus lysippus (Venezuela)
- Riodina lysippus erratica Seitz, 1913 (Brazil: Amazonas)
- Riodina lysippus lysias Stichel, 1910 (Ecuador, Bolivia)
