= Elisa Bracher =

Brazilian artist

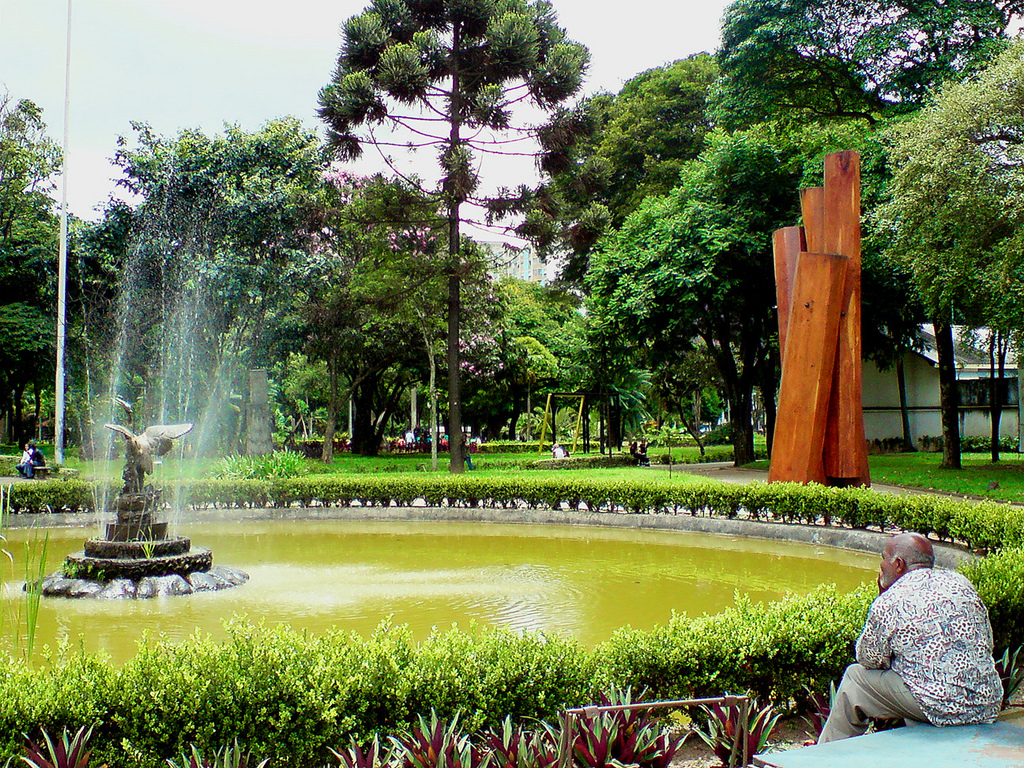
- Untitled (1999). Elisa Bracher sculpture at Jardim da Luz in São Paulo
- Born: March 2, 1965 (age 61); São Paulo, Brazil
- Education: Fundação Armando Alvares Penteado
- Known for: sculpture, public art, engraving, photography, drawing

Elisa Bracher (born March 2, 1965) is a Brazilian artist, mostly known for her wooden and stone monumental sculptures, as well as drawings and prints with organic or geometric features.

== Work ==
Elisa Bracher works with multiple techniques and materials, focusing primarily in drawing, engraving, sculpture and photography, but her career started as an engraver. Bracher studied art at Fundação Armando Álvares Penteado, in São Paulo, specializing in metal engraving, and began teaching drawing and engraving at the same school in 1989.

By the early 1990s, she was creating abstract engravings that we influenced by constructivism, for which she received four different acquisition awards in Brazilian art salons.

During the same period, she started to create three-dimensional objects in metal. Soon after, in the late 1990s, she started working with wood, particularly old and worn out logs, making the transition to large-scale sculptures fabricated from wood, stone, metal, or a combination of those materials. By the end of the decade, her monumental sculptures were being commissioned as public art in São Paulo, Rio de Janeiro, Essex, and Berlin.

Bracher is particularly interested in testing the limits and tensions between the materials with which she works, creating a delicate balance not only in her rice paper drawings but in her monumental sculptures. The exploration of lightness and darkness, presence and absence as well as overcoming technical limitations, are of fundamental importance and underpin her two-dimensional and three-dimensional artistic practice.

== Acaia Institute ==
Elisa Bracher is the founder and director of Instituto Acaia, a non-profit organization created in 2001 to support the physical and psychological development of children and youth through social-cultural education.

The Instituto Acaia grew out of carpentry workshops that the artist organized for the local youth in her studio in Vila Leopoldina, an industrial neighborhood in São Paulo, in 1997. By 2016 they were offering classes in carpentry, music, literacy, arts, animation, typography, capoeira, video, informatics, dressmaking, textile printing, and cooking for over 500 children and adolescents, as well as general tutoring and counseling services.
