= Ana Maria Tavares =

Brazilian artist

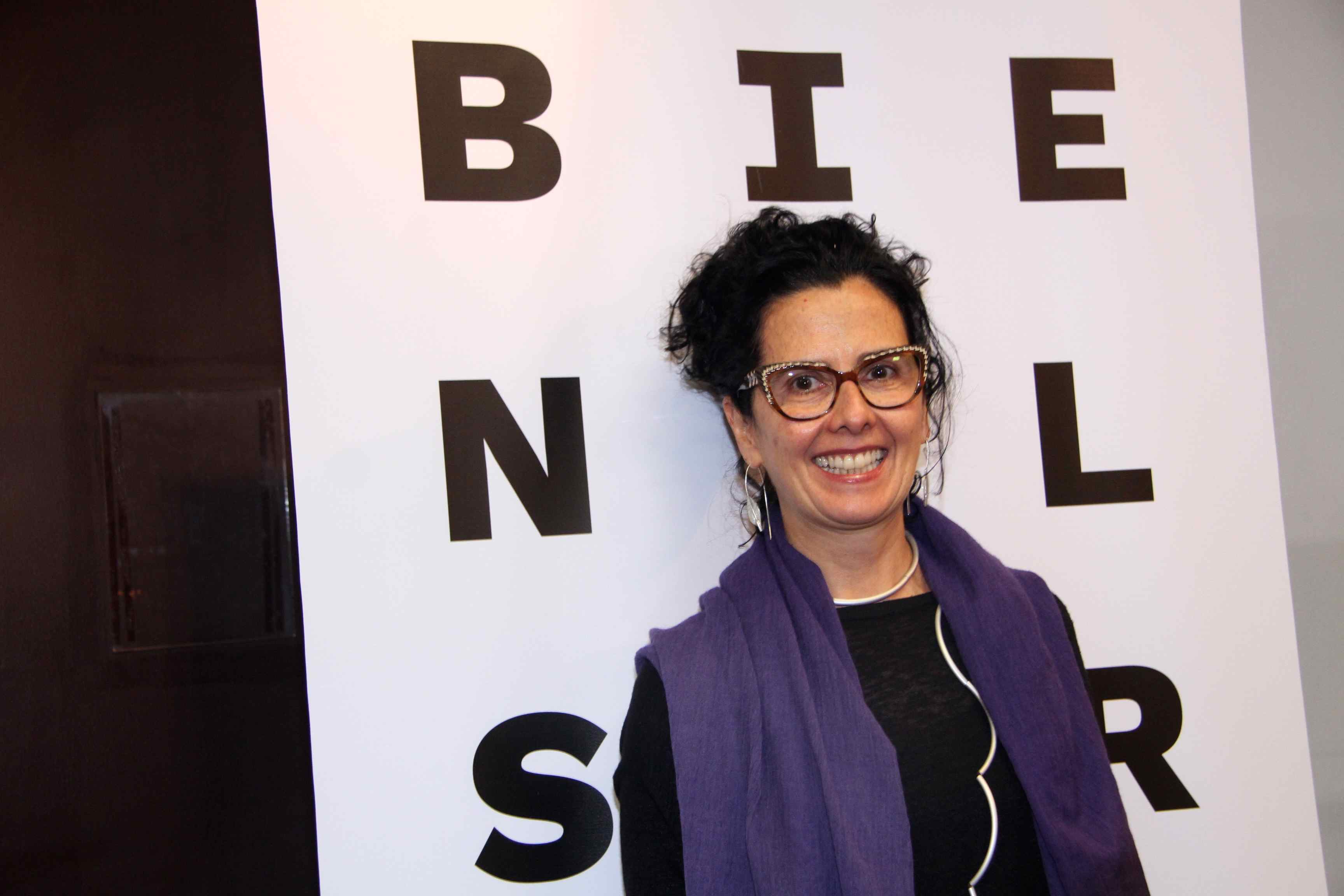
- Born: 1958 (age 67–68); Belo Horizonte, Minas Gerais, Brazil
- Education: School of the Fundação Armando Alvares Penteado; Art Institute of Chicago; University of São Paulo
- Occupation: Multimedia artist
- Awards: Guggenheim Fellow (2001)

Ana Maria Tavares (born 1958) is a Brazilian artist. A 2001 Guggenheim Fellow, she is a critic of modernism and specializes in the intersection of art, architecture and design.

== Biography ==
Ana Maria Tavares was born in 1958 in Belo Horizonte, where she attended high school. She obtained a Bachelor of Arts in 1982 from the School of the Fundação Armando Alvares Penteado. She continued her studies in the United States, where she obtained her Master of Fine Arts from the Art Institute of Chicago in 1986. She returned to Brazil due to the terms of her Fulbright LASPAU Scholarship, and in 2000, she obtained her PhD in art from the University of São Paulo, and she remained there as a professor of art. She was appointed a Guggenheim Fellow in 2001. She was the 2007 Ida Ely Rubin Artist-in-Residence at the Massachusetts Institute of Technology.

From October 2013 until January 2014, the Frist Center for the Visual Arts in Nashville, Tennessee held a solo exhibition, Ana Maria Tavares: Deviating Utopias Opens, where she critiqued the role of Oscar Niemeyer's work in social progress and focused on the perceivedly dystopian nature of large metropolitan areas. Her October to December 2014 exhibition Euryale Amazonica at the Sicardi Gallery was inspired by Victoria amazonica (namely the archaic synonym of the same name), a flower popular among British gardeners in the Victorian England; Emma Hurt of Houstonia said that Tavares and Gabriel de la Mora, who also exhibited alongside her, "presented two different kinds of artwork, but two exhibitions that successfully make viewers think, and look twice. Or more than twice."

Regarding Tavares' August 2018 solo exhibition Rotações Infinitas at Galeria Vermelho in São Paulo, Cynthia Garcia of Newcity Brazil said "it is plain to see why [Tavares] fires up experimentalism not only in her art but also in her students’ minds". Tavares held another solo exhibition at Galleria Continua in Paris, Ana Maria Tavares: Sortir du silence: au-delà de la modernité, from April to June 2023.

As an artist, she works in multimedia art and specializes in the intersection of art, architecture and design. Her artwork criticizes modernism as "an ideological construction with unexpected effects" and draws comparisons between modernist architects with their unorthodox counterparts.
