= Pinacoteca do Estado de São Paulo =

Art museum in São Paulo, Brazil

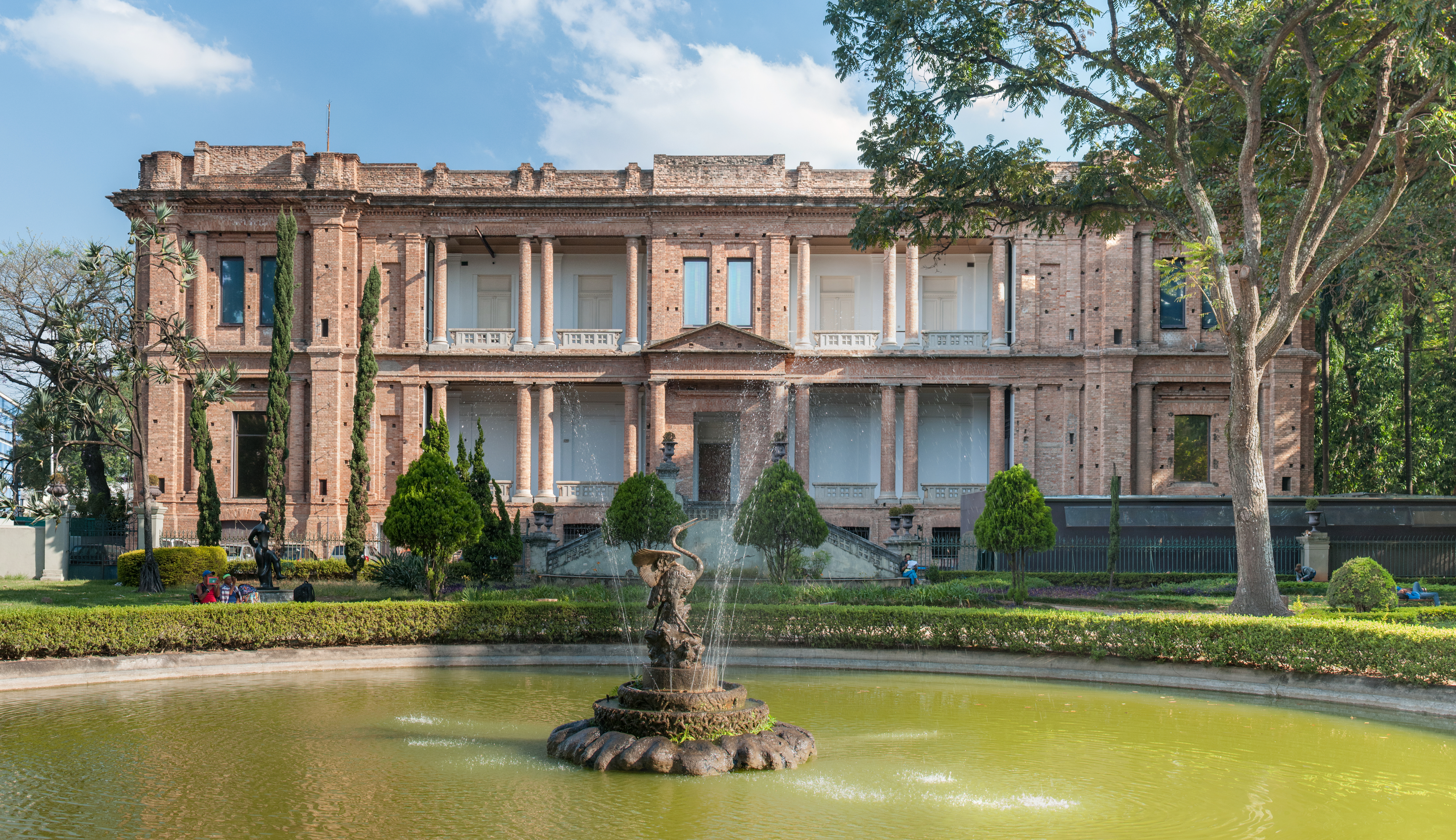
- Pinacoteca do Estado de São Paulo
- Interactive fullscreen map
- Established: 1905
- Location: São Paulo, Brazil
- Coordinates: 23°32′04″S 46°38′02″W
- Visitors: 397,000 (2007)
- Director: Jochen Volz
- Curator: Ana Maria Maia
- Public transit access: Luz
- Website: pinacoteca.org.br

The Pinacoteca de São Paulo (Portuguese for "pinacotheca (picture gallery) of the state of São Paulo") is a visual arts museum focused on Brazilian art from the 19th century to the present day, in dialogue with various cultures from around the world. Founded in 1905 by the Government of the State of São Paulo, the Pinacoteca is the oldest art museum in the city and has three buildings: Pinacoteca Luz, Pinacoteca Estação and Pinacoteca Contemporânea. The museum holds exhibitions of its renowned collection of Brazilian art and temporary exhibitions of national and international artists. The Pinacoteca also develops and presents multidisciplinary public projects, in addition to hosting a comprehensive and inclusive educational program.

The original collection was formed from the transfer of 20 works from the Museu Paulista of the University of São Paulo, together with another 6 works acquired from important artists from the city such as Almeida Júnior, Pedro Alexandrino, Antônio Parreiras and Oscar Pereira da Silva, especially to form the new collection.

After a renovation led by Paulo Mendes da Rocha in the 1990s, the museum established itself as one of the most dynamic cultural institutions in the country, integrating itself into the international exhibition circuit, promoting diverse cultural events and maintaining an active bibliographic production. Pina, as it is also known, also manages the space called Pinacoteca Estação, a historic building that also houses the Memorial da Resistência de São Paulo, installed in the old DOPS building, in Bom Retiro, where it holds temporary exhibitions.

In 2023, the museum opened its third building, Pina Contemporânea, integrated into Parque da Luz. The space has a public square for artistic and cultural activities, two galleries for exhibiting large-format works, studios for educational activities, as well as a store, auditorium, observation deck and reception area. In the same year, the then known Library and Documentation and Research Center was provided for the Pina Contemporânea building. In 2024, it was renamed the Visual Arts Library.

The Pinacoteca houses one of the largest and most representative collections of Brazilian art, with more than twelve thousand pieces covering mostly the history of Brazilian painting from the 19th and 20th centuries. Other highlights include the Brasiliana Collection, made up of works by foreign artists working in Brazil or inspired by the country's iconography, the Nemirovsky Collection, with an impressive set of masterpieces of Brazilian modernism, and the Roger Wright Collection, received on loan in January 2015. On average, the museum hosts 18 temporary exhibitions per year.

== History ==
The origins of the Pinacoteca de São Paulo date back to the creation of the Liceu de Artes e Ofícios de São Paulo. This, in turn, is the result of a context of profound social, political and economic changes that took place in São Paulo in the second half of the 19th century. The then province, which had remained of little importance until the 1870s, was undergoing transformations, driven by the expansion of coffee production and the consolidation of the railway network. It received a large influx of immigrants (intensified after the slavery abolitionism), which brought about significant transformations, ranging from material culture and eating habits to new forms of socialization. Urban centers became denser and more modern. In the city of São Paulo, the capital accumulated by coffee growers was reinvested in the fledgling industry, fueling the cycle of prosperity. New buildings were constructed and the rammed earth technique gave way to brick masonry. Noble neighborhoods were built to house the mansions and palaces of the coffee barons, always following European architectural standards, marked by eclecticism. Even more numerous were the working-class neighborhoods that emerged, expanding the urban core rapidly.

== Pinacoteca Luz ==
After the creation of the Liceu de Artes e Ofícios in 1873, the institution's sponsors negotiated with the provincial government the donation of a plot of land for the school, next to the Jardim Público da Luz – which occurred in 1896 –, in addition to the granting of resources for the construction of the headquarters, whose construction began in 1897.

The building, designed by Ramos de Azevedo and Domiciano Rossi, his main collaborator, has a monumental style in strong harmony with the principles of Italian eclecticism, consisting of three floors, with two internal courtyards to ensure ventilation and lighting. In the center, on the first floor, is the central lobby, with very high ceilings and windows facing the interior, which includes a dome, which was never completed. Imported materials such as Riga pine and French ceramics were used in the construction. In the project, the engineers planned to integrate the building with the Jardim da Luz, using side balconies and windows overlooking the park. The building was partially inaugurated in 1900, when some primary and art courses began to operate. However, the building was never completed, as evidenced by the exposed bricks on the façade and in the internal courtyards and the absence of the aforementioned dome, which was part of the original project.

The building was officially listed in 1982, with the aim of preserving one of the components of the architectural ensemble of the Luz neighborhood, characteristic of the turn of the 19th to the 20th century in São Paulo, which also includes the Luz Station, Júlio Prestes Station, the São Paulo Museum of Sacred Art, among others.

Between 1993 and 1998, the main building underwent extensive renovations led by architect Paulo Mendes da Rocha, together with architects Weliton Ricoy Torres and Eduardo Argenton Colonelli, which resulted in a museum adapted to the needs of international exhibitions, making the Pinacoteca do Estado a popular destination for many of the exhibitions that come to São Paulo. The renovation project was awarded the Mies van der Rohe Prize for Latin America to the three architects.

== Pinacoteca Estação ==
In 2003, the Pinacoteca de São Paulo also began to manage the building that housed the DOPS (Department of Order and Social Policy) in downtown São Paulo for over half a century. Opened in 1914 and designed by Ramos de Azevedo to serve as a warehouse for the Companhia Sorocabana, the building was completely restored according to a design by architect Haron Cohen. Today, called Pinacoteca Estação, the eight-thousand-square-meter space has the ideal technical conditions for the museum activities it hosts.

== Pina Contemporânea ==
On March 4, 2023, the Pinacoteca de São Paulo inaugurated the Pinacoteca Contemporânea building. The project, designed by Arquitetos Associados, was designed to be integrated into the century-old Parque da Luz and the neighborhoods of Bom Retiro and Luz. The Pinacoteca Contemporânea building is a long-standing dream of the museum. In 2015, with the transfer of the Prudente de Moraes State School to a new and more complete space, the group of buildings adjacent to Parque da Luz began to be designed to house the third building of the Pinacoteca de São Paulo. In 2018, the land was officially ceded to the Secretariat of Culture and Creative Economy of the State of São Paulo. Through the Associação Pinacoteca Arte e Cultura – APAC, a social organization that has managed the Pinacoteca de São Paulo since 2006, the contracting of the basic and executive projects and the approval procedures with the heritage preservation agencies and municipal authorities were initiated.

The proposal maintained the architectural volumes of the two blocks of buildings already on the site. One older, attributed to the Ramos de Azevedo office, is a remnant of the first school built there, and the other more modern, from the 1950s, designed by the architect Hélio Duarte. Connecting these two blocks is a large covered public square, measuring 1,339.2 m², and a pavilion containing the Galeria Praça, measuring 200 m², two studios for educational activities and the museum store. With 1,000m², the Grand Gallery, located in the basement, and a mezzanine overlooking Parque da Luz, where the cafeteria is located, complement the project, creating an environment that meets the fundamental requirements for a 21st century museum, while being friendly, inclusive and accessible.

== See also ==
- Ema Gordon Klabin Cultural Foundation
- Museu Nacional de Belas Artes
- São Paulo Museum of Art
- List of largest art museums
