= São Paulo School of Arts and Crafts =

School of Arts and Crafts of São Paulo
- Liceu de Artes e Ofícios
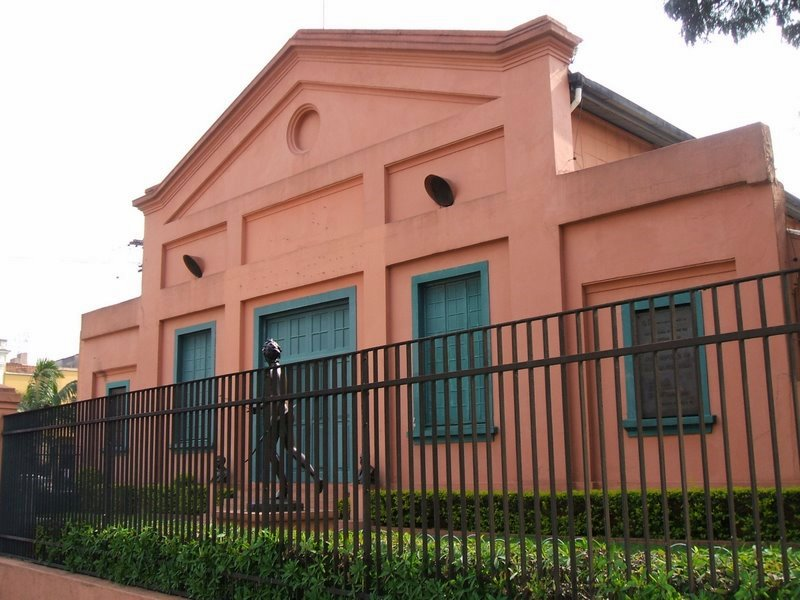
- Cultural Center of São Paulo School of Arts and Crafts
- Type: Private civil society
- Established: 1873
- Location: São Paulo, São Paulo, Brazil

The School of Arts and Crafts of São Paulo (Portuguese: Liceu de Artes e Ofícios) (LAOSP) is a Brazilian private civil society, whose main activities are involved with technical education. The institution also acts on cultural and industrial production.

Currently, the school of Arts and Crafts unfolds on three different bodies:

1. The LAO-Industry, which is the result of the dismemberment of the productive activity of the school. It is specialized in the manufacture of meters, gasometers and materials for construction and also acts as a sponsor of educational activities of the Liceu;
2. The Technical School of the Lyceum of Arts and Crafts of São Paulo, responsible for the end-activity of LAOSP It offers technical and regular education for high school students and technology-related courses and;
3. The Cultural Center, responsible for the promotion of arts in general and for maintaining the memory of the institution itself.

== History ==
The institution was created in 1873 by a group belonging to the elite of coffee aristocrats who intended to form specialized labor for a possible future industrialization of the country, according to the positivist ideal that preached the "dignity of man through work".

Initially it took the name "Propagator Society for People Instruction". During its early years, it was not intended to promote professional education. Nightly courses of first letters and Arithmetic, among others, were lectured for adults and children. Since then, however, there was already a Superior Council (chaired by the Director Leôncio de Carvalho) which represented the elite of Sao Paulo at that period.

After seven years, the Superior Council decided to completely reformulate the institution and turn it into a technical school. By then, the school had not yet a head office nor curriculum guidelines and the model adopted for the new institution was the European experiences of schools of Arts and Crafts (idealized by William Morris) . The Arts and Crafts Movement had already been happening in Europe for some time and preached the value of the manual work of craftsmen in the capitalist industry.

With the adoption of the name Lyceu de Artes e Officios, the new model began to be applied and courses of carpentry, locksmithing, cast, design, among others, were lectured, in the spirit of bourgeois positivist-Arts and Crafts.

From 1890, architect Francisco de Paula Ramos de Azevedo took the direction of the Liceu, and was responsible for a new reform of the school curriculum and administration that would make it thrive in an unprecedented manner.

Ramos de Azevedo was also a founder of Polytechnic School of the future University of São Paulo, and brought from Belgium an entrepreneurial spirit that would meet the interests of the Superior Council. From his reform on, the students of the school began receiving financial support for the work they produced. This work would carry the brand of quality of the school and sold throughout the country. With this model, the LAOSP has become self-sufficient and independent.

The school's financial prosperity enabled the creation of a permanent head office. In 1897 the Technical Office Ramos de Azevedo started the project the Praça da Luz building, which was never completely concluded, but was delivered in 1900. This building, through an agreement with the State of Sao Paulo, would be shared between the newly created LAOSP and the art gallery Pinacoteca do Estado de São Paulo.

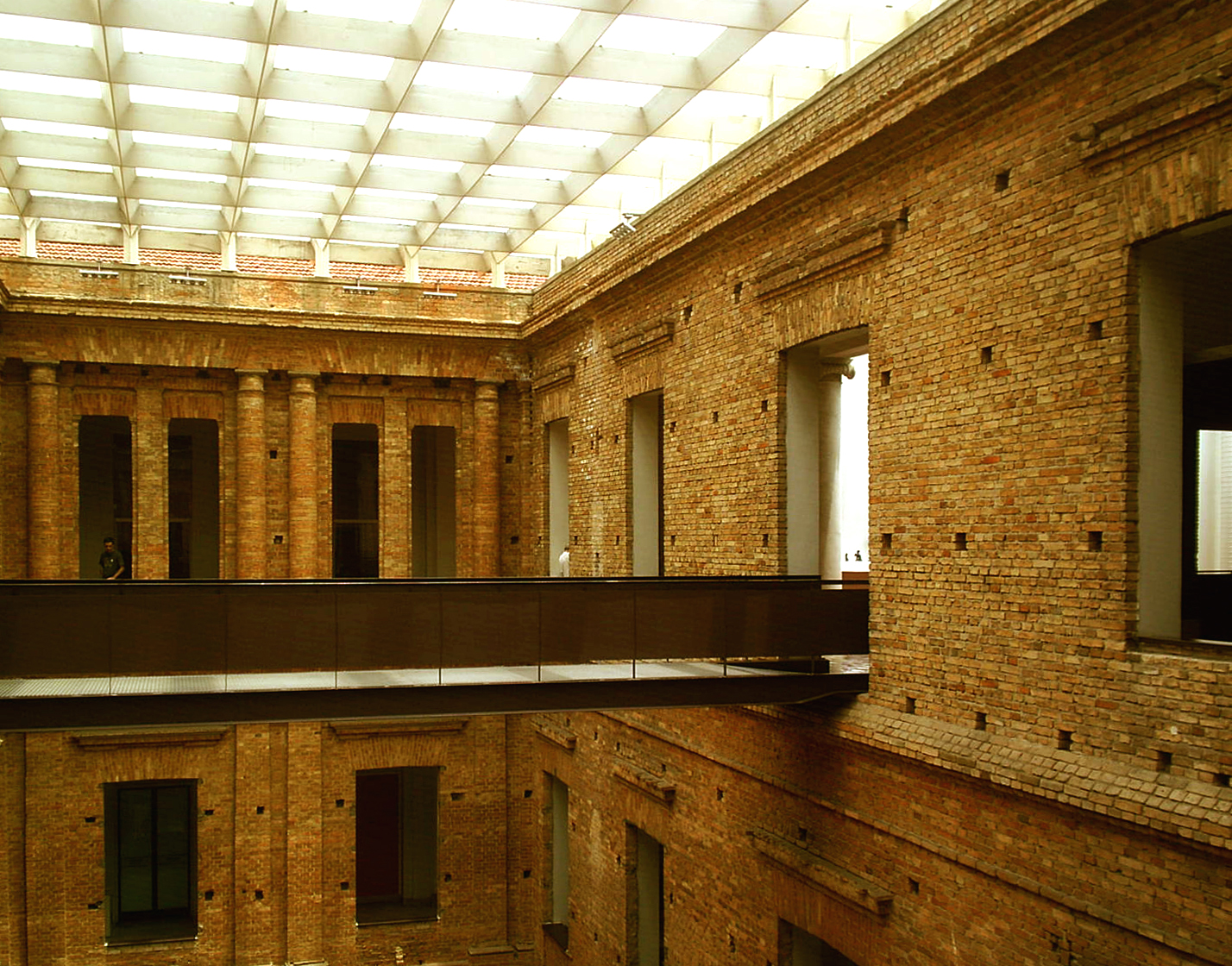
The building of Pinacoteca do Estado de São Paulo, originally intended to house both the State of São Paulo art collection and the School of Arts and Crafts

Industrial production of Liceu prospered significantly during periods of World Wars, with the increased consumption of items produced in the country, due to the reduction of imports.

In this period, names like Victor Brecheret, Alberto Santos-Dumont, and Adoniran Barbosa have been through the School. It became the main promoter and director of works in Art Nouveau style in Brazil.

From the 1950s on, the country adopted new model of industrial development, and the craftsmen of the Lyceum became inadequate for the new production activities. There was a separation between the industrial activity of the institution and its educational section. All the original ideal of inseparability between art and industry was lost from there.

Among the products of this new industrial phase are the implementation of casings at the MASP; accomplishment of part of the furniture Cumbica International Airport and production of 24-hour cash machines.

In the 1970s, with a new curriculum reform, the Technical School itself is established. The first courses were Edification (EDI), Machinery and Engines (Into Mechanics - MEC - later), Decoration, Electronics (ELO) and later of Design Construction (DCC) and Electrotechnics. Four of these courses (EDI, ELO, MEC and DCC) represented the core teaching of the school and survived until 2002, the date of graduation of its latest class.

Throughout history, the school was guided by a group of principles of action generally linked to free education, vocational training and humanistics. Recently, however, through the reforms implemented by LAO-Industry, a paid model of education was instituted, and professional education was completely separated from regular high school course.

=== Works with the brand Liceu ===
The following list comprises buildings and monuments in which there are records of the actions of the school, whether in its construction process or in the materials employed.

- Pinacoteca do Estado de São Paulo - ornaments shaped by apprentices of the Lyceum.
- Teatro Municipal de São Paulo - huge chandelier in the atrium was produced in the workshops of the Lyceum.
- Palace of Industries of Sao Paulo - lightning rod made by the school.
- Júlio Prestes Station - frames executed by Lyceum.
- Monument to Duque de Caxias - built in the Lyceum.
- Monument to Ramos de Azevedo - built in the Lyceum, under the guidance of Galileo Emendabili.
- Monument to the Bandeiras - built in the Lyceum, under the guidance of Victor Brecheret.
