= Ramos de Azevedo =

Brazilian architect

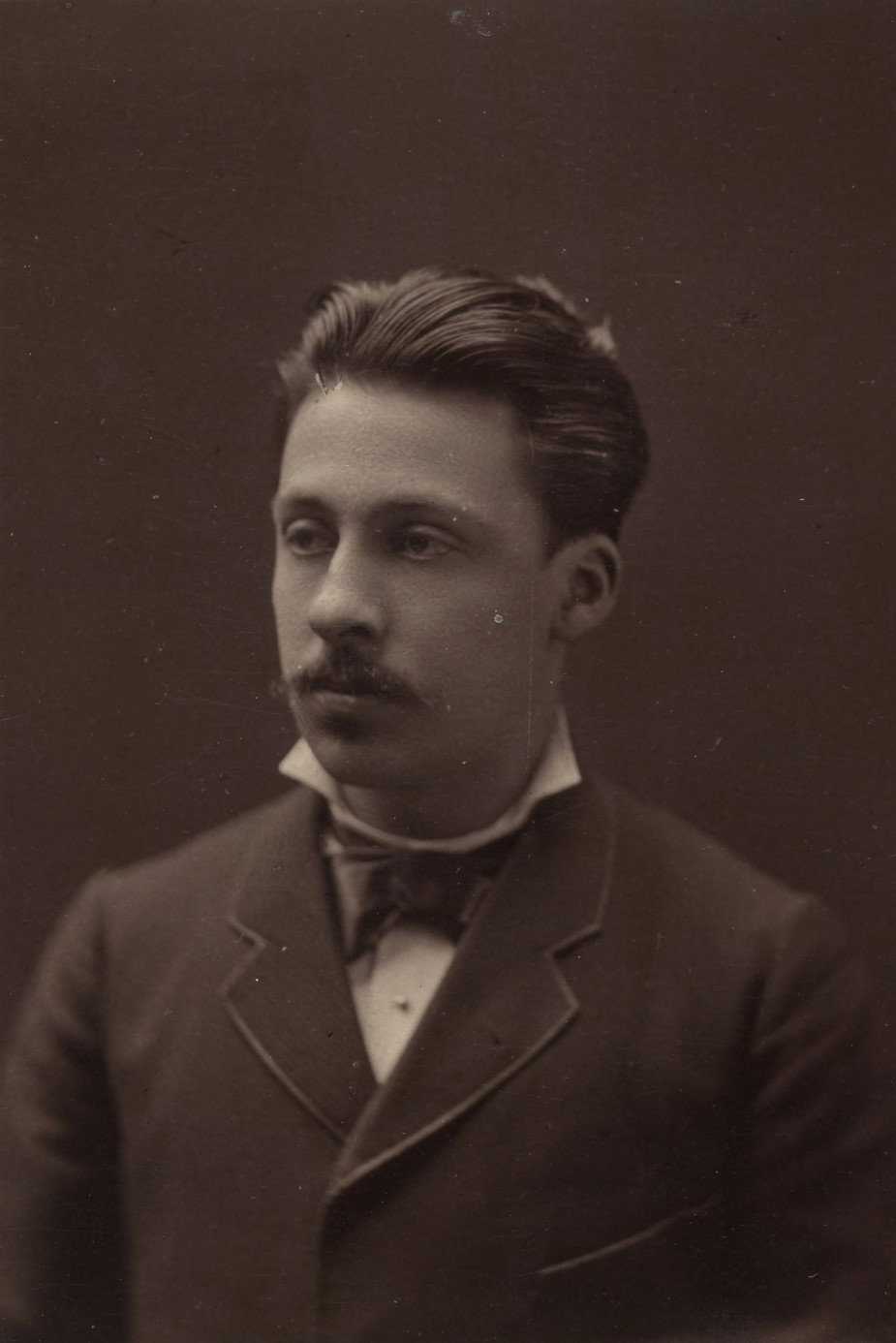
- Ramos de Azevedo in 1879
- Born: 8 December 1851; São Paulo, Empire of Brazil
- Died: 13 June 1928 (aged 76); Santos, São Paulo, Brazil
- Occupations: Architect; engineer; professor
- Design: Eclecticism; Art Nouveau; Art Deco

Francisco de Paula Ramos de Azevedo (8 December 1851 — 13 June 1928) was a Brazilian architect, known for designing various buildings and landmarks in São Paulo, such as the Teatro Municipal, the Mercado Municipal, and the Pinacoteca. He was one of the founders and director of the University of São Paulo's Polytechnical School.

== Biography ==
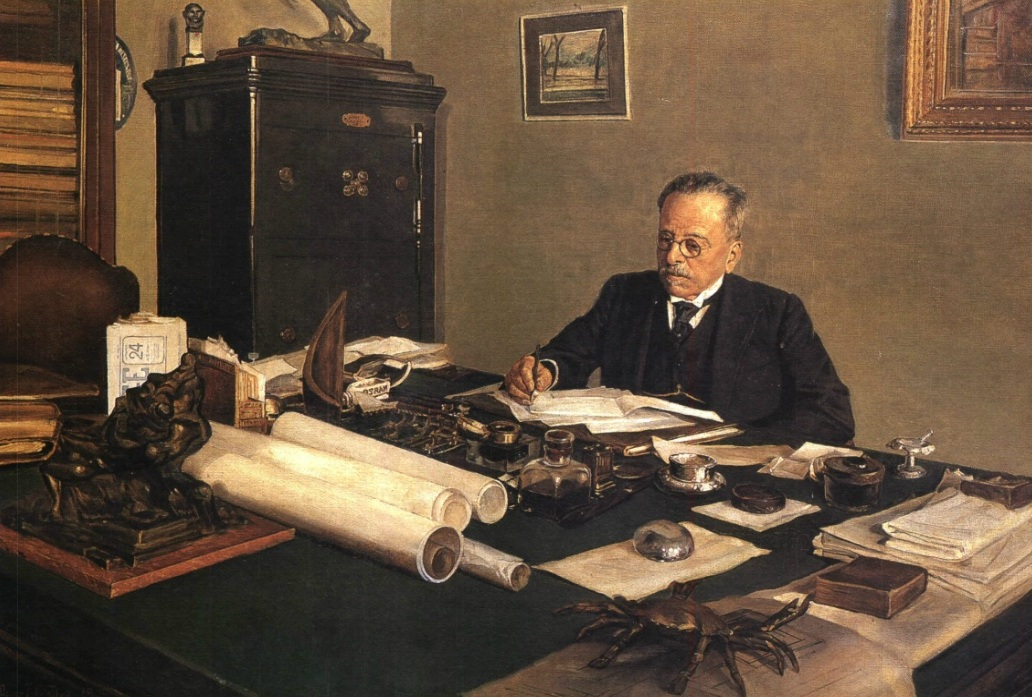
Portrait of Ramos de Azevedo by Oscar Pereira da Silva

Ramos de Azevedo was born in São Paulo to a wealthy family from Campinas. In 1878, he went to Ghent, Belgium, to study civil engineering at the École Speciale du Génie Civil et des Arts et Manufactures. According to his biographers, however, it is said that the director of the School of Architecture course was surprised by the quality of his work and ordered him to change his career. At school he studied classical architecture, but was influenced to follow the propositions of architectural eclecticism. He graduated in this course in 1886.

Back to Brazil, Ramos de Azevedo established himself in Campinas and there performed his first projects. He was responsible for the completion of construction of the city's cathedral.

In the late 19th century he was invited to design the homes of some members of the São Paulo elite.

Together with a group of São Paulo aristocrats linked to progressive political currents, Ramos de Azevedo founded the Polytechnic School, establishing the school a model similar to that experienced in Europe. Its link with education also happened when he became director of the Liceu de Artes e Ofícios of São Paulo, where he promoted an educational reform that would make the school self-sufficient and recognized throughout the country.

Because of the importance of his work for the city of São Paulo, a monument in his honor was built in front of the Liceu's building, in the Tiradentes Avenue. Because of the subway works in the 1970s, this monument was moved to the campus of the University of São Paulo, and is currently at Ramos de Azevedo Square, in front of the Polytechnic School.

== List of notable projects ==
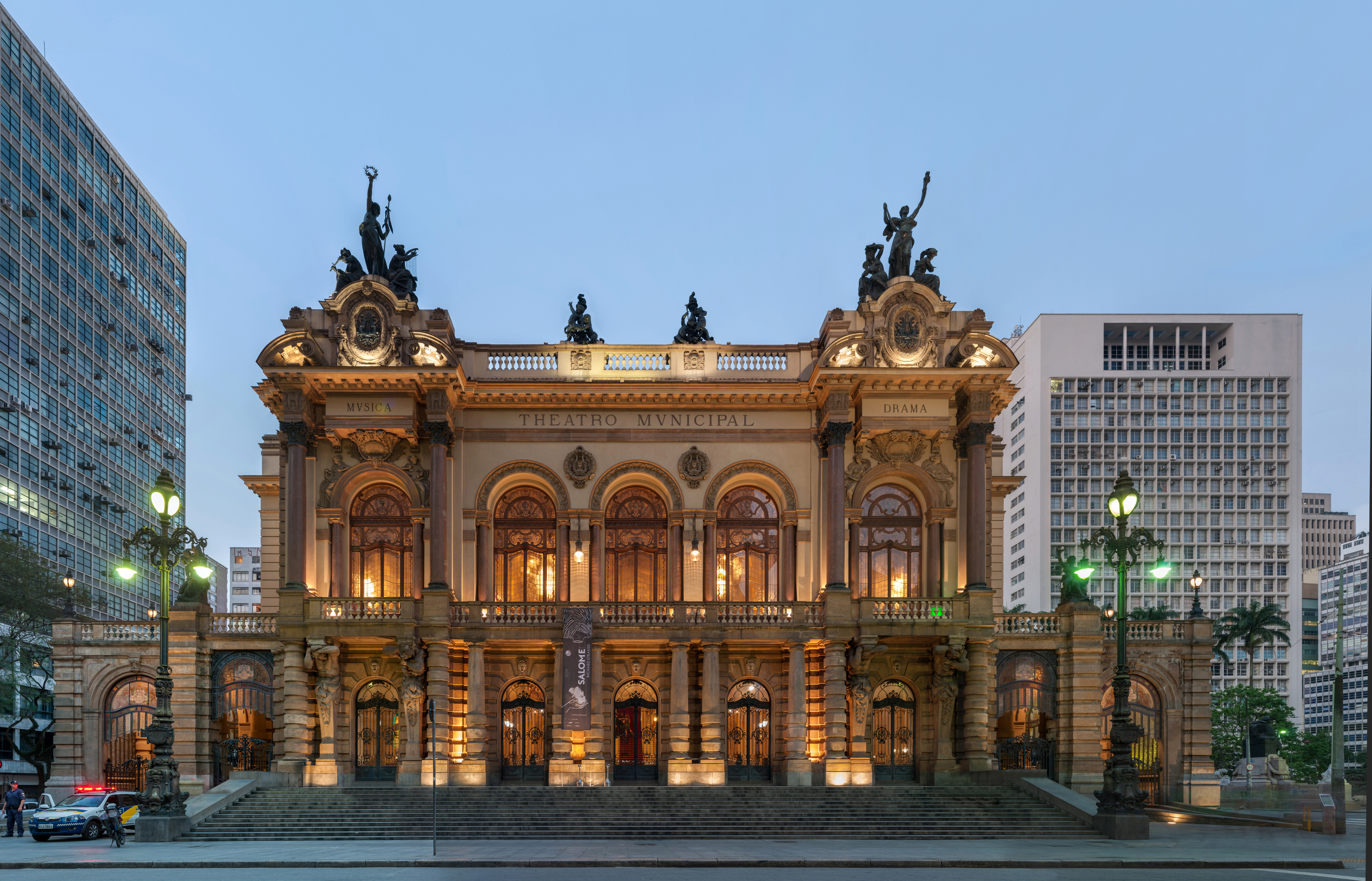
Teatro Municipal de São Paulo

Palácio das Indústrias

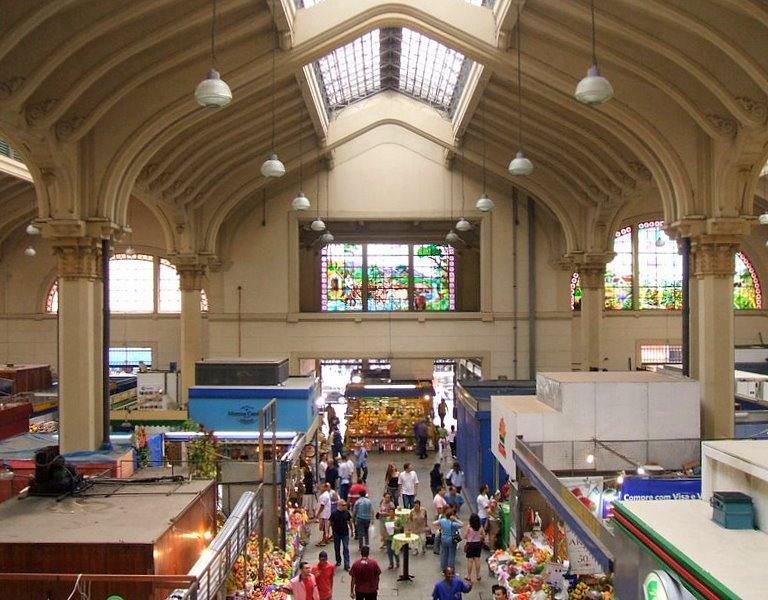
Interior of the Municipal Market of São Paulo

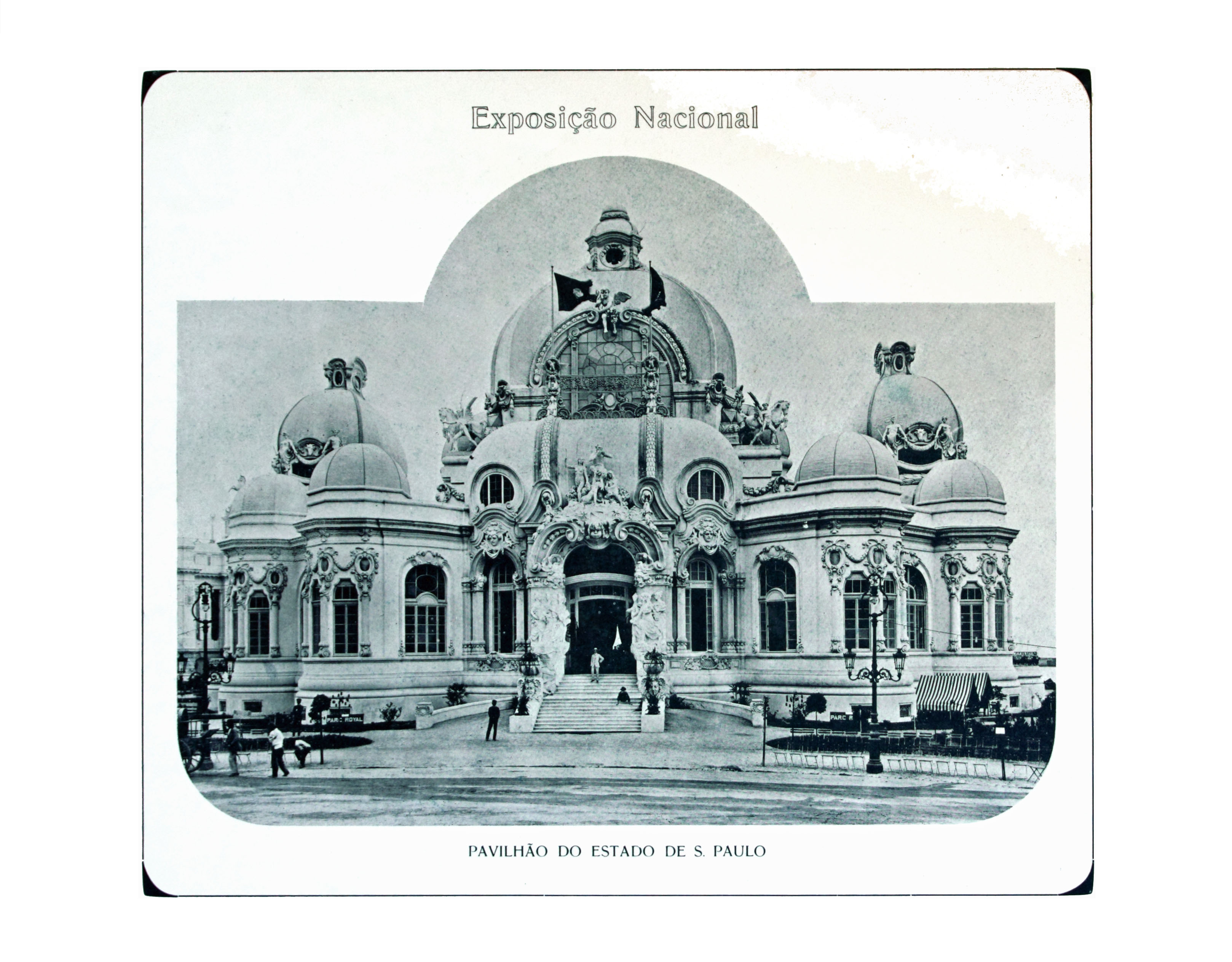
São Paulo state pavilion in Rio de Janeiro
- Hospital Psiquiátrico do Juqueri (1895–98)
- Museu da Polícia Militar do Estado de São Paulo (1896)
- Teatro Municipal de São Paulo (1903–11)
- São Paulo state pavilion at Exhibition of the Centenary of the Opening of the Ports of Brazil (1908)
- Escola Politécnica da Universidade de São Paulo (1893)
- Palácio das Indústrias (1920s)
- Cemitério da Consolação (fronton) (1870)
- Fazenda Pau d'Alho (1920s)
- Colégio Técnico de Campinas (1920)
- Museu Casa das Rosas
- Colégio Politécnico Bento Quirino (1920s)
- Colégio Sion (1920s)
- Pinacoteca de São Paulo (1893)
- Post Office Palace (1920s)
- Catedral Metropolitana de Campinas (Anos 1880)
- Mercado Municipal de Campinas (1902)
- Municipal Market of São Paulo (1928)
- Faculdade de Medicina da Universidade de São Paulo (1905)
