= Municipal Market of São Paulo =

Public market in São Paulo, Brazil

- Mercado Municipal de São Paulo
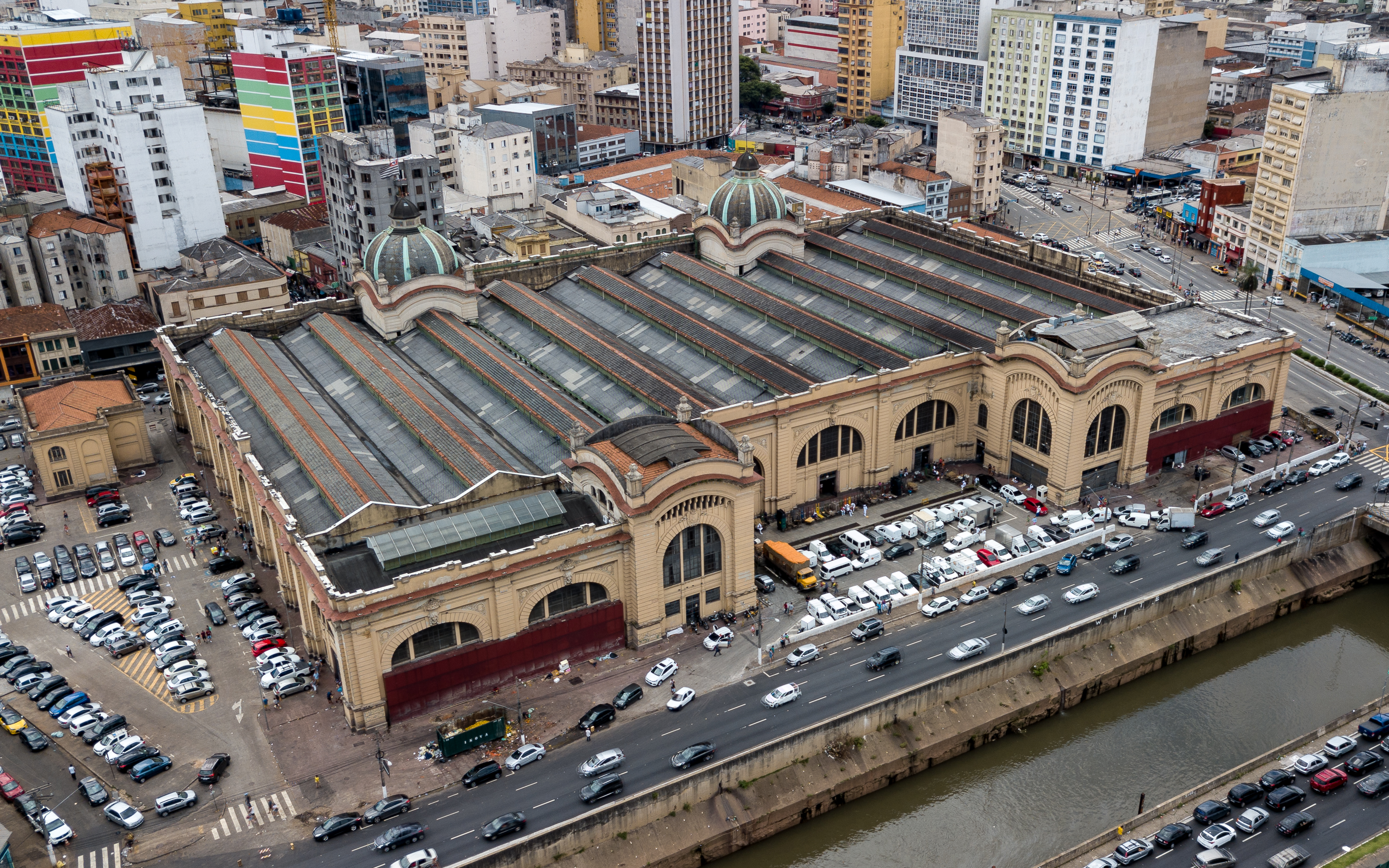
- Municipal Market of São Paulo at night

- Location within São Paulo Municipal Market of São Paulo (Brazil)
- Alternative names: Mercadão

General information
- Type: Public market
- Architectural style: Eclectic style
- Location: Rua da Cantareira, 306, São Paulo, Brazil
- Coordinates: 23°32′30″S 46°37′45″W
- Construction started: 1928
- Opened: 1933
- Renovated: 2004

Technical details
- Floor count: 2
- Lifts/elevators: 1

Design and construction
- Architect: Francisco Ramos de Azevedo

Website
- www.oportaldomercadao.com.br

The Municipal Market of São Paulo (Portuguese: Mercado Municipal Paulistano, or Mercado Municipal de São Paulo) is a large public market in São Paulo, Brazil. It was designed by the architect Francisco Ramos de Azevedo and inaugurated on January 25, 1933 as a wholesale and retail post specializing in fruits, vegetables, cereals, meats, spices, and other food products. The market is located in the Mercado neighborhood, a name that references the market, in the historic center of São Paulo. It is located near the Tamanduateí River in the old Várzea do Carmo, a floodplain of the river now primarily used as Dom Pedro II Park. The market was formally named the Mercado Municipal São Paulo in 1995.

== Structure ==
The first floor of the market is occupied by retailers, and the second floor mezzanine serves as a restaurant. The Mercadão occupies 12,600 square metres (136,000 ft^{2}) and has 1,500 employees working at various in the building. 450 tons of food passes through the market per day in more than 290 boxes.

== Façade ==
The façade of the Municipal Market is the work of Felisberto Ranzini (1882–1976), an Italian-Brazilian who worked in the architectural office of Ramos de Azevedo. Ranzini, who also participated in the construction of the São Francisco Law School, utilized a mix of Ionic and Doric columns on the municipal market. The massive columns allow for large spaces for glazing in the market which in turn provide a large source of natural light.

== Stained glass ==
The market is noted for its stained glass. 72 stained glass, arranged in 32 panels, are the work of the artist Conrado Sorgenicht Filho and his office, Casa Conrado Sorgenicht. Sorgenicht is noted for his work the windows of the São Paulo Cathedral and 300 other Brazilian churches. Unlike stained glass produced as sacred works, the windows of the market depict various aspects of food production in the greater São Paulo region.

== Renovation ==
A third and most significant renovation of the market was proposed in 2003 as part of the Program for the Revitalization of Central São Paulo (Programa de Revitalização do Centro de São Paulo) financed by the Inter-American Development Bank. A new 2,000 square metres (22,000 ft^{2}) mezzanine with eight restaurants, new exterior lighting, and the replacement of the market floor with granite slabs were completed by August 2004.
