= Franco da Rocha =

Municipality of Franco da Rocha
- Municipality
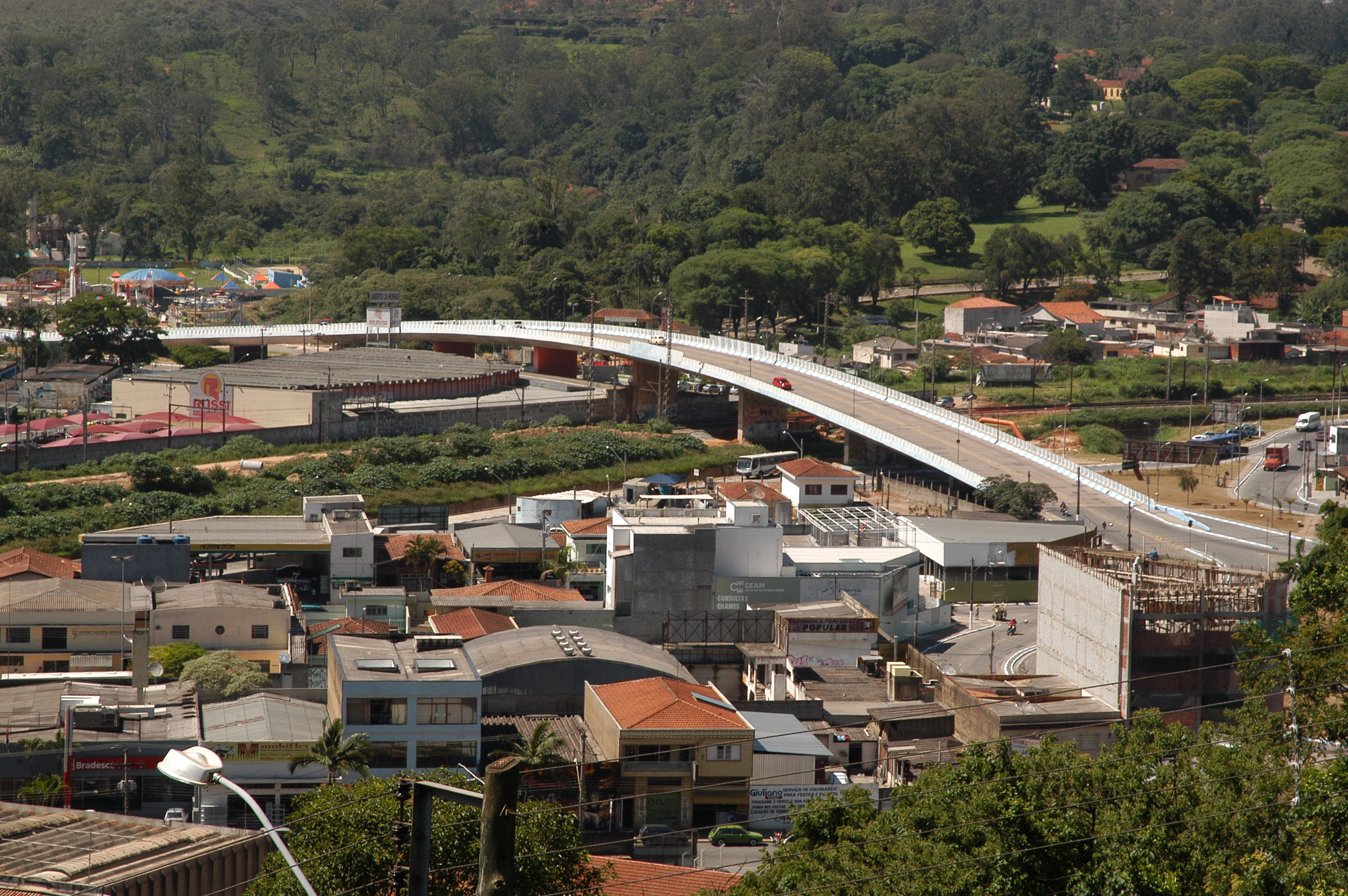

- Flag Coat of arms
- Nickname: Franco

- Location in Brazil
- Coordinates: 23°19′43″S 46°43′28″W
- Country: São Paulo
- Region: Southeast Brazil
- State: São Paulo
- Metropolitan Region: São Paulo

Government
  - Mayor: Lorena Oliveira (Solidariedade)

Area
  - Total: 132.78 km^{2} (51.27 sq mi)

Population (2022 Census)
  - Total: 144,849
  - Estimate (2025): 150,241
  - Density: 1,090.9/km^{2} (2,825.4/sq mi)
- Time zone: UTC−3 (BRT)
- HDI (2010): 0,731 – medium
- Website: Franco da Rocha

Franco da Rocha is a municipality in the state of São Paulo. It is part of the Metropolitan Region of São Paulo. The population is 144,849 (2022 Census) in an area of 132.78 km^{2}. The suburban city is served by CPTM Line 7 (Ruby).

The municipality contains the 2,058 hectares (5,090 acres) Juqueri State Park, created in 1993.

== History ==
The municipality was created by state law in 1944.

In February 2016, the municipality signed a Friendship Declaration with Stepanakert, the capital of the partially independent Republic of Artsakh.

== Media ==
In telecommunications, the city was served by Companhia Telefônica Brasileira until 1973, when it began to be served by Telecomunicações de São Paulo. In July 1998, this company was acquired by Telefónica, which adopted the Vivo brand in 2012.

The company is currently an operator of cell phones, fixed lines, internet (fiber optics/4G) and television (satellite and cable).

== See also ==
- List of municipalities in São Paulo
