= List of people from São Paulo =

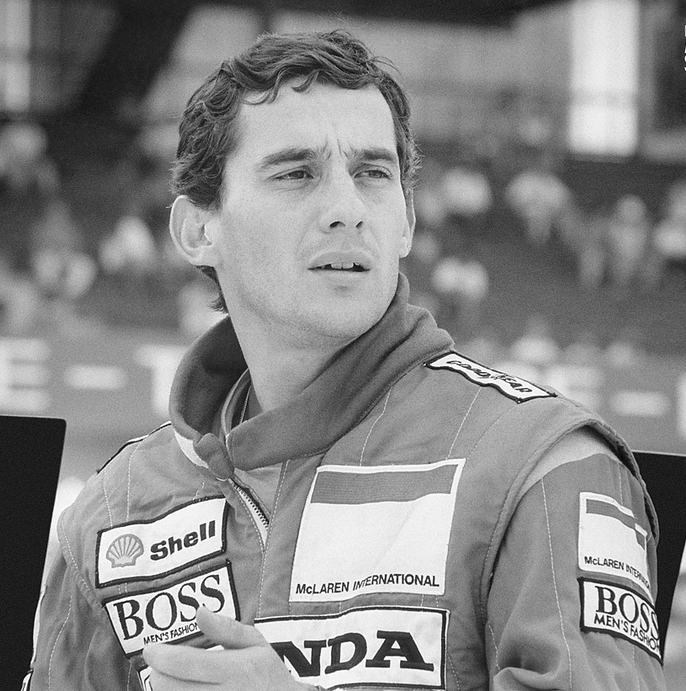
Ayrton Senna, Formula One driver

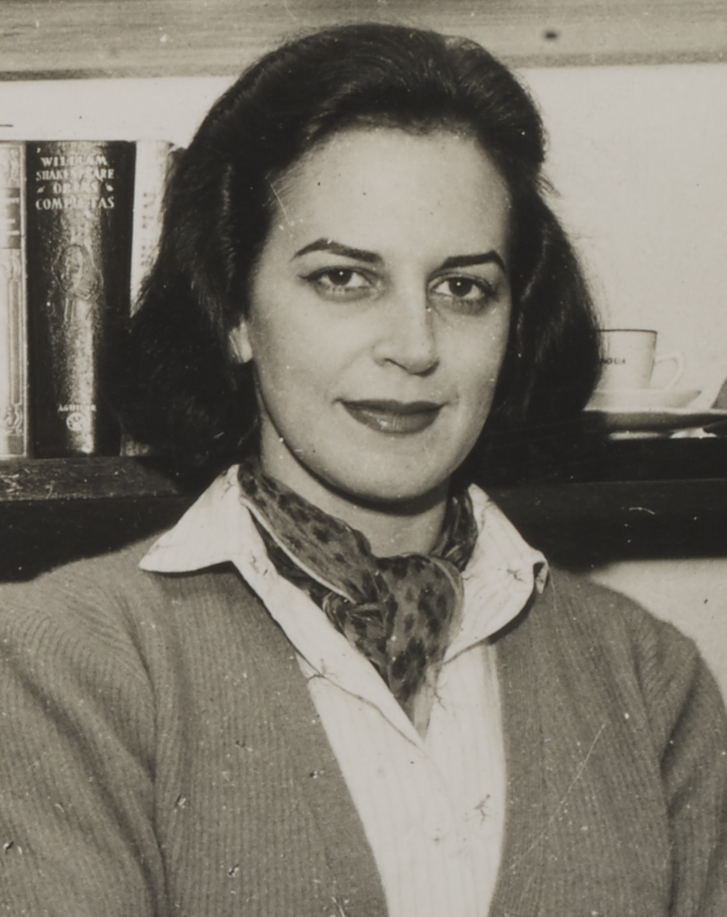
Lygia Fagundes Telles, novelist and writer; first Brazilian woman to be nominated for the Nobel Prize in Literature

The people who are born in the City of São Paulo are called Paulistanos in Brazil, while the people who are born in State of São Paulo, independent of the city, are called Paulistas. These people made extensive contributions to Brazil's (and the world's) history, culture, music, literature, education, science, and technology and a great hub of Brazilian growth and innovation in all these areas. Notable people born in the City or the State of São Paulo include:

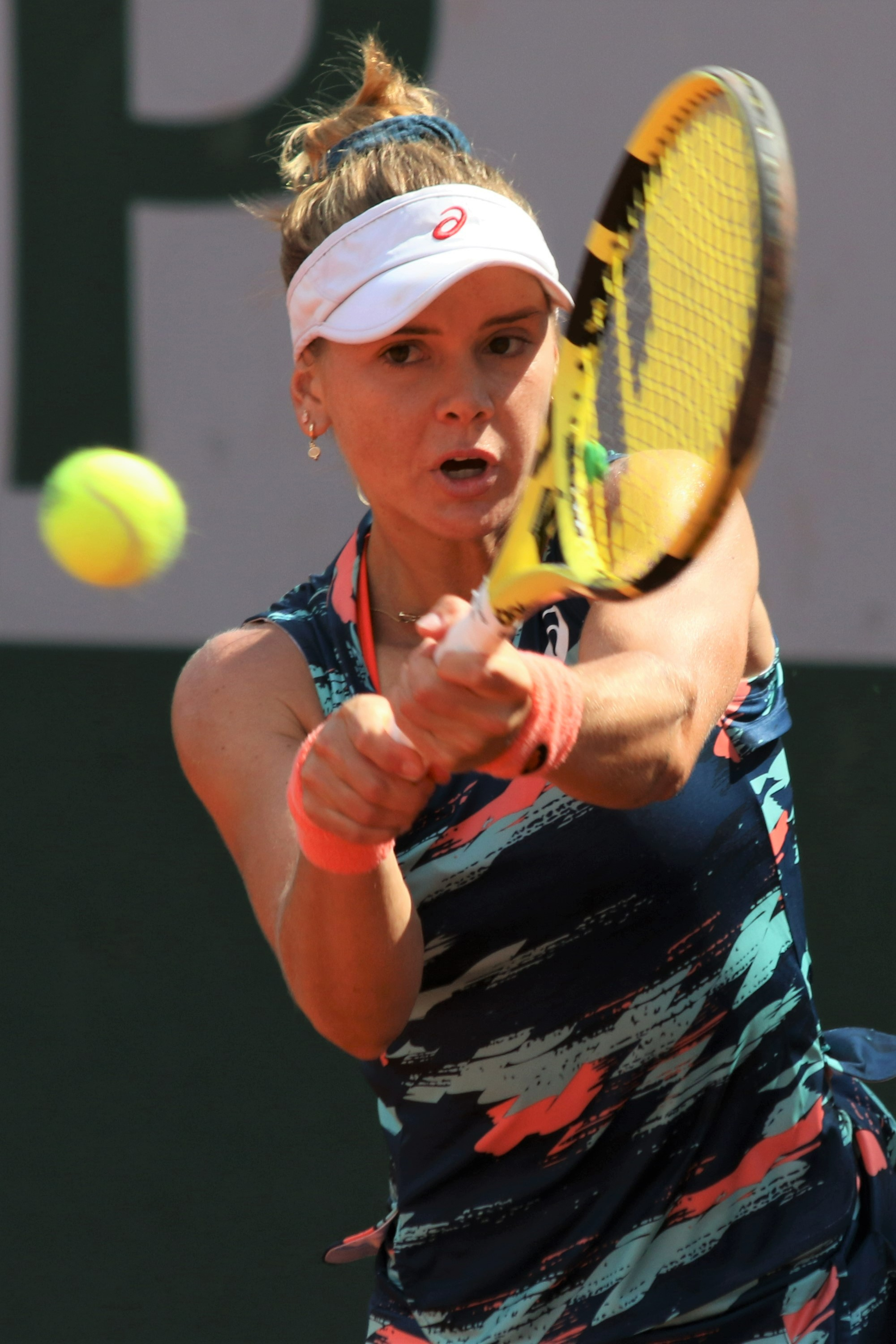
Laura Pigossi, tennis player

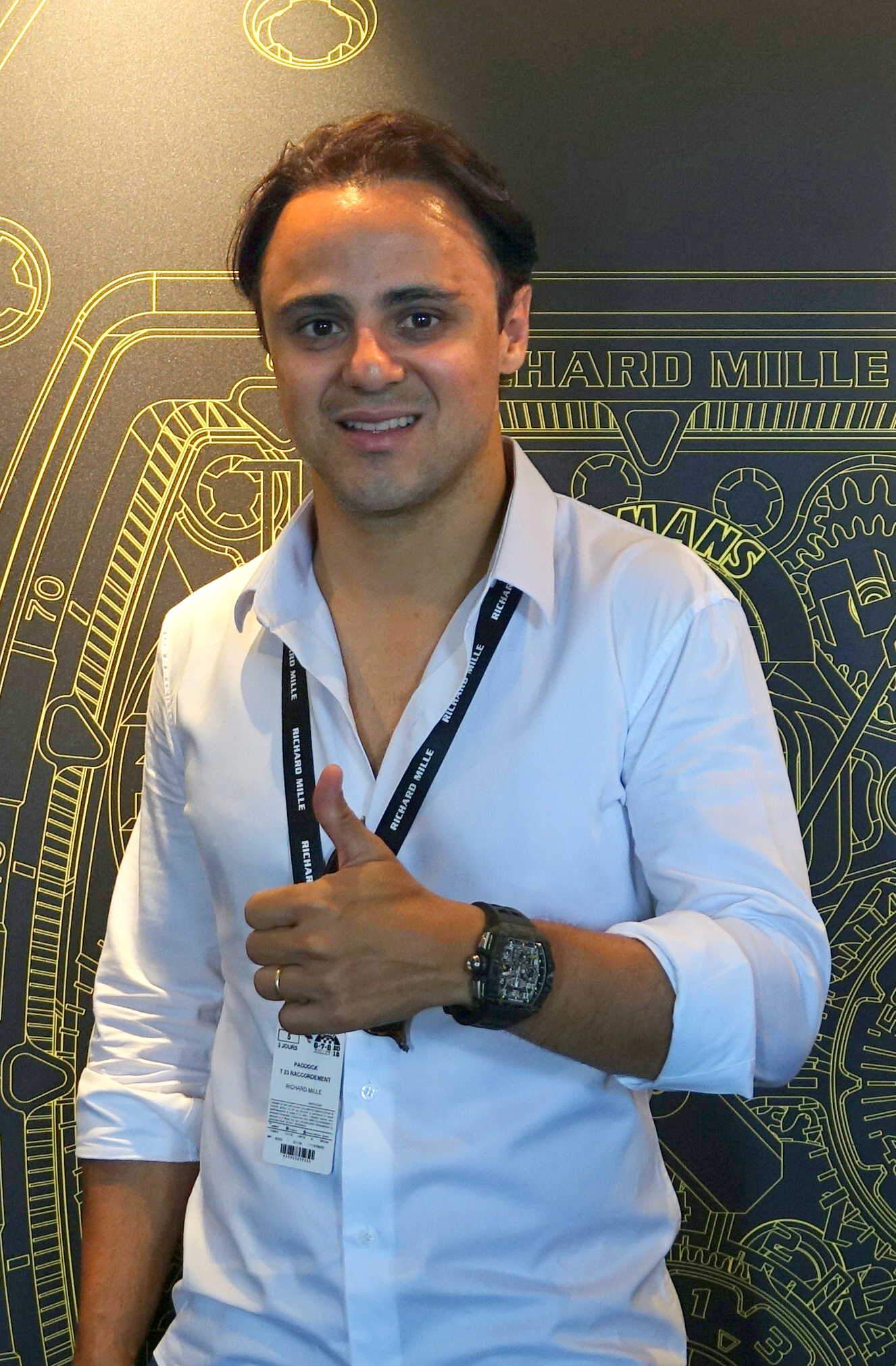
Felipe Massa, former Formula One driver

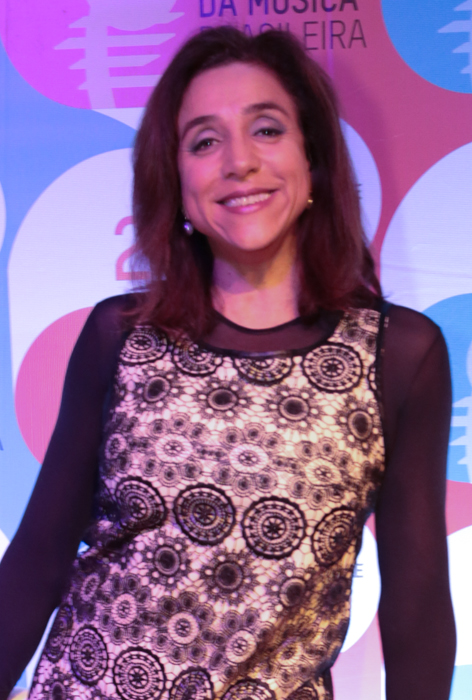
Marisa Orth, actress, singer, and television host

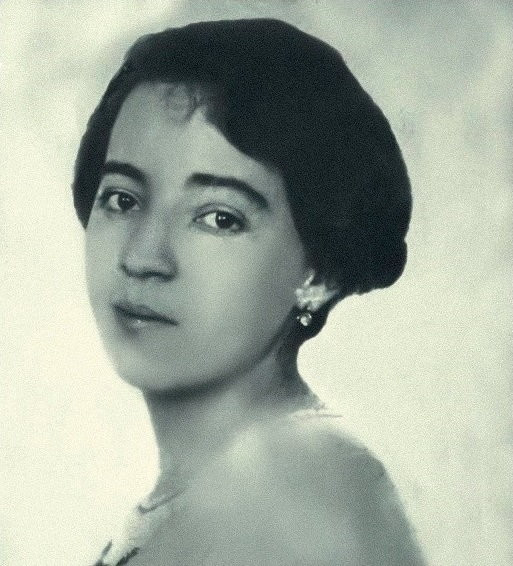
Anita Malfatti, artist

== A–M ==
- Briel Adams-Wheatley – beauty influencer
- Francisco de Paula Ramos de Azevedo (1851-1928) - Architect
- Gianne Albertoni (b. 1981) – model
- Frida Alexandr (1906–1972) – writer
- Sandra Annenberg (b. 1968) – journalist
- Graça Araújo (1956-2018) – journalist, moved to São Paulo at age 3 and lived there for many years
- Líbero Badaró (1798–1830) – physician, botanist, journalist and politician
- Luiz Cesar Barbieri (b. 1981) – football player known as "Cesinha"
- Lina Bo Bardi (1914–1992) – Modernist architect
- Rubens Barrichello (b. 1972) – racing driver
- Yara Bernette (1920–2002) – classical pianist
- Sagramor de Scuvero Brandão (1921–1995) – actress and radio personality
- Maria Bueno (1939–2018) – tennis player
- Luciano Burti (b. 1975) – racing driver
- Bruno Caboclo (born 1995) – basketball player
- Lília Cabral (b. 1957) – actress
- Cafu (b. 1970) – football player
- João Batista Calixto de Jesus (1922–1994) – artist
- Pablo Campos (b. 1983) – football player
- Alice Piffer Canabrava (1911–2003) – economic historian
- Laura Cardoso (b. 1927) – actress
- Boris Casoy (b. 1941) – journalist
- César Cielo (b. 1987) – swimmer
- Elvis Johnny Correa (b. 1986) – football player
- Rochelle Costi (1961–2022) – artist and photographer
- Laerte Coutinho (b. 1951) – cartoonist and screenwriter
- Fernão Dias (1608–1681) – Bandeirante
- Abílio Diniz (1936–2024) – chairman and businessman
- Milene Domingues (b. 1979) – model
- Elsie Dubugras (1904–2006) – journalist, medium, parapsychologist and plastic artist
- Eliana (b. 1972) – television presenter
- Eliane Elias (b. 1960) – jazz pianist, singer, composer and arranger
- Rodrigo Faro (b. 1973) – television presenter and actor
- Vicente Feola (1909–1975) – football coach
- Christian Fittipaldi (b. 1971) – racing driver
- Emerson Fittipaldi (b. 1946) – racing driver
- Adriane Galisteu (b. 1973) – television presenter
- Raul Gil (b. 1938) – television presenter
- Luciana Gimenez (b. 1970) – television presenter
- Elias Gleizer (1934–2015) – actor
- Yan Gomes (b. 1987) – Major League Baseball player
- Ailton Graça (b. 1964) – actor
- Beatriz Haddad Maia (b. 1996) – tennis player
- Alexandre Herchcovitch (b. 1971) – fashion designer
- Luciano Huck (b. 1971) – television presenter
- Eder Jofre (1936–2022) – boxer
- Gilberto Kassab (b. 1960) – mayor of São Paulo
- Andreas Kisser (b. 1968) – guitarist
- Felipe Kitadai (b. 1989) – Olympic medalist judoka
- Amyr Klink (b. 1955) – sailor
- Mike Krieger (b. 1986) – co-founder of Instagram
- Dodi Leal (b. 1984) – academic, performer and trans-rights activist
- Rita Lee (1947–2023) – rock-and-roll singer
- Tiago Leifert (b. 1980) – journalist and television presenter
- Maria Lenk (1915–2007) – swimmer
- Paula Lima (b. 1970) – singer
- Gabriel Magalhães (b. 1997) – football player
- Anita Malfatti (1889–1964) – painter
- Paulo Maluf (b. 1931) – governor of São Paulo
- Felipe Massa (b. 1981) – Formula One driver
- Marcos Mion (b. 1979) – television presenter
- Eric Moxey (1894–1940) – Royal Air Force (British) bomb-disposal expert

== N–Z ==
- Marcio Navarro (b. 1978) – mixed-martial arts fighter, former ISKA world-champion kickboxer
- Alessandra Negrini (b. 1970) – actress
- Tomie Ohtake (1913–2015) – visual artist
- Charles Oliveira (b. 1989) – mixed-martial arts fighter; former UFC Lightweight Champion
- Paolla Oliveira (b. 1982) – actress
- Marisa Orth (b. 1963) – actress
- José Carlos Pace (1944–1977) – racing driver
- Ernesto Paglia (b. 1959) – journalist
- Alex Pereira (b. 1987) – mixed-martial arts fighter; former kickboxer champion
- Monalisa Perrone (b. 1969) – journalist
- Laura Pigossi (b. 1994) – tennis player
- Marcos Pontes (b. 1963) – astronaut
- Maitê Proença (b. 1958) – veteran telenovela actress
- Jânio Quadros (1917–1992) – lawyer and politician
- Giovana Queiroz (b. 2003) – footballer for Brazil
- Muricy Ramalho (b. 1955) – football coach
- Nando Reis (b. 1963) – singer
- Sérgio Reis (b. 1940) – singer
- Caio Ribeiro (b. 1975) – football player
- Suzane von Richthofen (b. 1983) – convicted murderer
- Maria Rita (b. 1977) – singer
- Rivelino (b. 1946) – football player
- Zé Roberto (b. 1974) – football player
- Ellen Rocche (b. 1979) – actress
- Cairo Santos (b. 1991) – player of American football
- Djalma Santos (1929–2013) – football player
- Ricardo Semler (b. 1959) – entrepreneur
- Ayrton Senna (1960–1994) – racing driver
- Anderson Silva (b. 1975) – mixed-martial arts fighter
- Margarida Teresa da Silva e Orta (1711–1793) – writer, poet
- Aldir Mendes de Souza (1941–2007) – painter and physician
- Mauricio de Sousa (b. 1935) – cartoonist and businessman
- Luisa Stefani (b. 1997) – tennis player
- Lygia Fagundes Telles (1918–2022) – writer
- Suzana Vieira (b. 1942) – actress
- Fernanda Vasconcellos (b. 1984) – actress
- Viola (b. 1969) – football player
- Eva Wilma (1933–2021) – actress
- Marcos Winter (b. 1966) – telenovela actor
- Valêncio Xavier (1933–2008) – writer and director
- Mariana Ximenes (b. 1981) – actress
- Chucri Zaidan (1891–1980) – physician; in 1966, received the title of Paulistano Citizen of the Municipal Chamber of São Paulo
