= Arthur Sendas =

Brazilian businessman (1935–2008)

- Born: Arthur Antônio Sendas; 1935; São João de Meriti, RJ, Brazil
- Died: October 20, 2008 (aged 72); Rio de Janeiro, Brazil
- Occupation(s): Owner, Sendas Supermarket

Arthur Antônio Sendas (1935 in São João de Meriti – October 20, 2008 in Rio de Janeiro) was a Brazilian businessman and business magnate, who founded one of Brazil's largest supermarket chains, Sendas supermarket.

Sendas began building and growing his first grocery store when he was just 17 years old. Eventually Sendas grew to become one of Brazil's largest chains. Sendas supermarkets were sold to rival company, Grupo Pão de Açúcar, in 2003. The supermarkets continue to be operated under the Sendas name.

On October 20, 2008, Sendas was shot as he opened the door of his Leblon, Rio de Janeiro, apartment. He died of his injuries at a Rio de Janeiro hospital hours later at the age of 72. Sendas’ 28-year-old driver, Roberto Costa Jr., who was seen arguing with Sendas shortly before the shooting, later confessed to the murder. Police detective Bianca Araujo said that Costa feared losing his job after Sendas' grandson João Arthur Sendas decided to move to the United States.

After his death, his first-born son Arthur Sendas Filho, took over as the CEO. His son João Antônio Sendas committed suicide in 2003. Sendas was a supporter of CR Vasco da Gama. The Governor of Rio de Janeiro state, Sérgio Cabral Filho, declared three days of mourning following Sendas' death.
