= Mappin =

- Company type: Privately held company
- Industry: Retail
- Founded: São Paulo (29 November 1913)
- Defunct: 1999
- Headquarters: São Paulo, Brazil
- Key people: Walter Mappin; Hebert Mappin; Alberto Alves; Cosette Alves; Ricardo Mansur
- Website: http://www.mappin.com.br/

Mappin was a traditional department store in Brazil, based in São Paulo, with the official name of Casa Anglo-Brasileira S/A. With origins in 1774 in the city of Sheffield, England, it was later brought to Brazil by the brothers Walter and Hebert Mappin.

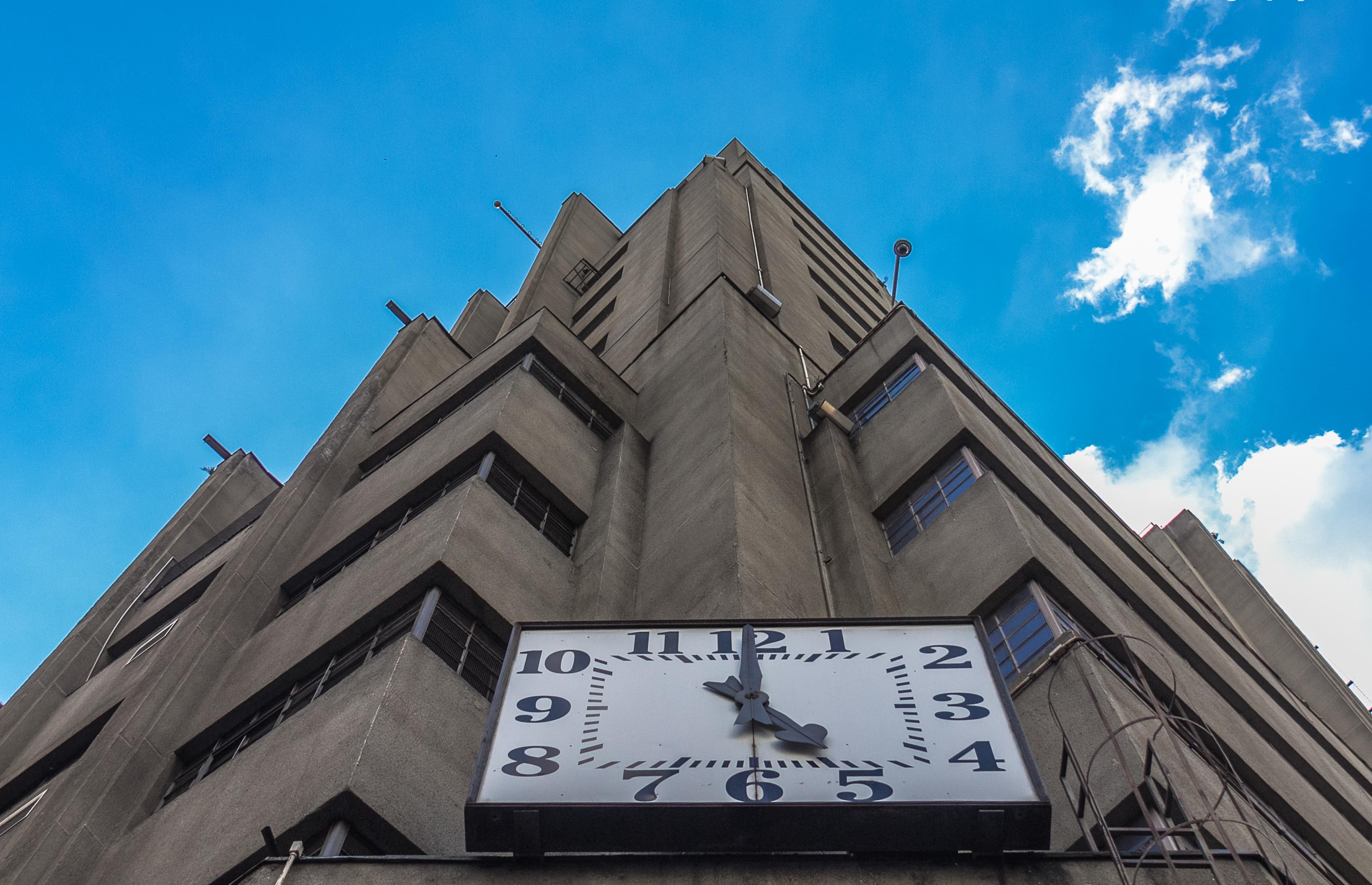
Old building of Mappin in the Ramos de Azevedo Square, São Paulo, 2013

== History ==
During the 86 years in which it served São Paulo, it was one of the pioneers of the retail trade. In the 1930s, innovated by putting labels with prices in the windows. Was the driving force behind the installment plan. Between 1940s and 1950s, Mappin was the meeting point of São Paulo elite. Anticipated the "concept" of shopping mall, bringing together products of various types in one location. The store at Praça Ramos de Azevedo, in the center of São Paulo, has become a benchmark of the brand.

Some branches were opened:

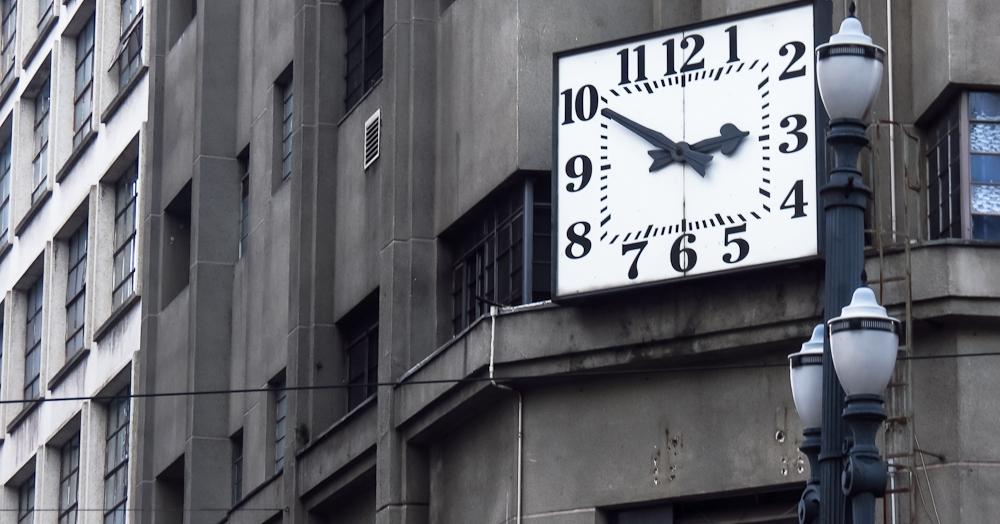
The traditional clock on the building of the first major store located at Praça Ramos de Azevedo.

- 1969 – Rua São Bento
- 1977 – Avenida São João: the first of São Paulo to have its own parking lot
- 1984 – Itaim Bibi
- 1987 – Shopping Mappin ABC, the first store outside the São Paulo state capital
- 1991 – Shopping Center Norte, Shopping West Plaza and Shopping Morumbi
- 1991 – It was created the TV Mappin: sale of products by telephone
- 1993 – Shopping Jardim Sul
- 1995 – Esplanada Shopping, in Sorocaba, São Paulo state countryside

Its most famous jingle was: "Mappin, venha correndo, Mappin, chegou a hora, Mappin, é a liquidação" [Mappin, come running, Mappin, the hour has come, Mappin, it is the sale].

== Campaigns ==
- Liquida, liquida! Eletrodomésticos, higiene, autopeças, etc. [Sale, sale! Home appliances, hygiene, car parts, etc.] (1975)
- Economia é só no Mappin [Economy is only on Mappin] (1977/78)
- Compre tudo para a Copa do Mundo [Buy everything for the World Cup] (1986)
- Compre de novo para a Copa do Mundo [Buy again for the World Cup] (1990)
- TV Mappin (1992)
- Turma da Mônica (1980–1999) (bankruptcy)

== The end ==
It closed down in 1999, during the administration of Ricardo Mansur. It had its bankruptcy decreed along with the Mesbla stores, who had been incorporated into Mappin in 1996. In 1999, Grupo Pão de Açúcar, through the Extra hypermarkets, took over the store in Praça Ramos de Azevedo, whose building belongs to the Santa Casa, with the "Extra Mappin" flag, and soon abandoned it. In 2003, the store was closed under the allegation of having low profitability, not offsetting the point of sale maintenance costs, and the store did not meet more at the "quality standards that should be part of all the flags of the group."

According to the Mônica Bergamo's column on 3 June 2009, Ricardo Mansur, the last owner of the network, considered to reopen Mappin, including forwarding a request of bankruptcy to the judge and tried to raise money from international investors. However, on 12 November 2010 there was a judicial auction, and the Mappin brand, valued at R$12 million, was bought by the network Lojas Marabraz by less than half of the price. The general director of Marabraz, Nasser Fares, aims to put the brand on active duty, at the latest in 2016.

== See also ==
- Mesbla
