= Michael Klein (businessman) =

Brazilian business executive (born 1951)

- Born: 1951 (age 74–75); Munich, Germany
- Citizenship: Brazilian
- Education: Paes de Barros University; Getulio Vargas Foundation
- Occupations: CEO of Casas Bahia; Chairman of Grupo CB; Former chairman of Via Varejo
- Years active: 1969-present
- Children: 4
- Website: www.grupocb.com.br

Michael Klein (born 1951) is a Brazilian business executive. He is the CEO of Casas Bahia, a Brazilian chain of department stores, and former chairman of Via Varejo, the parent company of Casas Bahia, Cnova Brazil and Ponto Frio. Michael's father, Samuel Klein, founded Casas Bahia in 1952. Since June 2019, the Klein family own a controlling stake in Via Varejo.

In 2015, in its annual ranking of the wealthiest people in the world, Forbes listed Klein with a personal net worth of $1.3 billion.

== Career ventures ==
=== Casas Bahia and Via Varejo ===
Klein graduated with a degree in business administration from Paes de Barros University, and completed his post-graduate studies at the Getulio Vargas Foundation. In 1969, he joined Casas Bahia as a financial manager. In 2009, Klein became CEO of the company after his father retired in Brazil. In 2010, he was elected chairman of the board of directors of Via Varejo. His son, Raphael Oscar Klein, has served as a member of the board of directors of Via Varejo.

In May 2013, it was announced that the Klein family, which owned 47% of Via Varejo, was planning to sell 16% of their stake in the company. In September 2013, Klein transferred 17.6 million of his shares of Via Varejo to his children, and as a result, his stake in the company has been reduced from 21.9% to 18%. 53.7 million common shares of the family's stake began trading on December 16, 2013. Via Varejo raised R$ 2.845 billion through a public offering of shares. Three quarters of the amount raised went to the Klein family, while the rest went to GPA. Ownership of the company has changed to GPA with 43.3%, the Klein family with 27.3%, and minority shareholders with 29.3%.

In June 2014, Cnova, a global e-commerce company with a total gross merchandise volume of $4.9 billion, was created through a joint venture between Casino, GPA, Via Varejo and Exito. Cnova will be directly owned 46.5% by Casino (including its subsidiary Exito) and 53.5% indirectly by GPA, Via Varejo and certain founding shareholders of Nova Pontocom. The Klein family hold a 5.98% stake in Cnova, which owns and operates the following online stores: Extra.com.br, Casasbahia.com.br, Pontofrio.com, Cdiscount.com.br, Barateiro.com, Pontofrio Atacado, and eHub.com.br.

In August 2014, it was announced that Klein may sell an amount of shares valued at R$3 billion of his stake in Via Varejo.

In May 2016, it was announced that Klein is interested in buying back control of Via Varejo.

In October 2016, it was revealed that the Steinhoff Group is in talks to buy the Klein family's stake in Via Varejo, in a deal that could reach R$1.5 billion.

In March 2017, it was reported that Klein is lining up a proposal with several investment funds to buy back control of Via Varejo. Under Klein's plan, he would become the majority shareholder of Via Varejo, with just over 50% of the shares, and would have autonomy in management. In May 2019, it was reported that Klein has hired the financial advisory services of XP Investimentos to evaluate the acquisition of Via Varejo.

In June 2019, it was announced that the Klein family became the largest shareholder of Via Varejo with a 27% stake, after GPA sold its entire stake.

As of July 2020, the Klein family hold a 22.75% stake in Via Varejo, which consists of the following individual stakes:

- Michael Klein - 2.38%
- Eva Klein (Michael Klein's sister) - 5.13%
- Goldentree Fundo de Investimento em Ações (owned by the Klein family) - 7.72%
- Twinsf Fundo de Investimento Multimercado Crédito Privado (owned by the Klein family) - 7.52%

=== Grupo CB ===
In May 2014, BR Properties, a Brazilian real estate investment firm, confirmed it was negotiating a sale of its assets with Klein. In July 2014, Grupo CB, the Klein family's holding company chaired by Michael Klein, purchased a real estate fund from BR Properties for R$606.65 million. The fund includes 26 C&A stores, a Brooksfield store, a Sendas store, a call centre, and offices on Paulista Avenue in downtown São Paulo, totaling 118,000 square meters of commercial space.

In March 2015, Grupo CB acquired five office properties occupied by Wells Fargo, totaling 1.6 million square feet across four Southern U.S. states.

In March 2016, Grupo CB opened a Mercedes-Benz dealership in Jundiai, São Paulo.

In October 2019, it was reported that Klein is planning to sell R$2 billion worth of a warehouse portfolio, composed of almost 1 million square meters of 13 warehouses.

Today, Grupo CB holds a R$6 billion portfolio. The portfolio includes 432 real estate properties, including stores, industrial warehouses, administrative complexes, offices and distribution centers, totaling over 2 million square meters of commercial space. Grupo CB's rental revenue is expected to be R$430 million in 2017.

==== CB Air ====
CB Air, an air taxi company founded by Klein in 2012, has received operational authorization from ANAC in January 2015. The company's fleet includes 15 business jets and helicopters, and 2 hangars in Campo de Marte Airport and Sorocaba Airport.

In September 2013, it was announced that Klein was in talks to purchase AVX Táxi Aéreo, an air taxi company owned by Eike Batista.

In April 2016, it was revealed that Neymar purchased a business jet from the Klein family for $9.1 million.

In August 2016, it was announced that Klein has made an offer for the purchase of Global Aviation, an air taxi company. Created in 1994, Global Aviation resulted from the merger of Reali Táxi Aéreo, Pássaro Azul and Global Táxi Aéreo. It operates a 25-aircraft fleet of planes and helicopters, as well as bases in Brazil’s top airports. It recently inaugurated a hangar in Sorocaba, São Paulo, with capacity for 17 aircraft where it offers runway services, aircraft management, medevac, shared ownership and aircraft sales, in addition to domestic and international private flights. On August 22, it was announced that Klein has purchased Global Aviation for R$70 million. The deal means CB Air will increase its fleet to 32 aircraft from 12, and will have combined revenues of R$200 million in 2017. In December 2016, it was announced that the National Civil Aviation Agency (ANAC) and the Administrative Council for Economic Defense (CADE) granted CB Air the green light for the acquisition of Global Aviation without restriction. The name of the new operator will be announced in the first quarter of next year and the new air taxi company will have a fleet of 34 aircraft including airplanes, helicopters and ten hangars and two heliports.

After the merger of CB Air with Global Aviation, the company is now branded Icon Aviation. With a revenue forecast of R$160 million in 2017, Icon Aviation offers several services in the area of business aircraft, such as aircraft and helicopter charters, management, sale and purchase of aircraft, shared ownership, hangar and track services. The company has a fleet of 30 aircraft, including 22 airplanes and eight helicopters, as well as 10 hangars and 285 employees. The new brand will bring together all aviation companies that are now part of the group: CB Air Táxi Aéreo Ltda., Global Táxi Aéreo Ltda., Pássaro Azul Táxi Aéreo Ltda., SSR Assessoria e Prestação de Serviços Ltda., and Security Táxi Aéreo Ltda.
