= Political kidnapping =

Abduction for a political purpose

Political kidnapping is kidnapping which is conducted to obtain political concessions from security forces, governments or intelligence agencies.

== Rise ==
Political kidnapping can have vast impacts, such as the kidnapping of Chiang Kai-Shek creating the Second United Front and uniting China against Japan at the start of World War 2.

There were series of kidnapping of senior diplomats during the 1960s and 1970s. By the end of the 1960s, political kidnappings were evidently profitable.

For a long period, political kidnapping was usually a Latin American phenomenon, with some few overlooked incidents in Europe. After the 1990s, when the interest of tourists and businessmen increased in Asian and Pacific countries, the kidnappings also became a means to support the political motives of newly established dissidents groups, such as Abu Sayyaf's group, which has conducted numerous political kidnappings.

== Worldwide ==
=== In the Middle East ===
Arab history features a concept known as 'desert diplomacy'. Per the Gulf Research Center, "The objective of this traditional activity was to apply pressure on hostile tribesmen by issuing demands, the fulfillment of which would lead to the safe return of their son or daughter. Demands would be, as they are today, financial, moral or political; although hostages would rarely be killed. Nevertheless, retention of the hostage for some years was not unusual. The kidnappings taking place in Iraq today are ones far departed from the traditional practices of Arab (and indeed, other nations ) tribal warfare which were governed by a strict protocol, ensuring decent, gentle and safe treatment of the captives."

Various groups in the Palestinian Resistance and in the Lebanese Civil War (1975-1990) employed political kidnapping as a method.

Al-Qaeda began using political kidnappings around 2004.

==== In Iran ====
The Islamic Revolutionary Guard Corps (IRGC) has kidnapped many journalists, including Ruhollah Zam, who fled to France and was kidnapped back to Iran for his execution, according to Reporters Without Borders. Iran has 'kidnapped' the bodies of dead journalists, holding them until relatives deny that the journalists were killed by security forces.

Activists, especially female activists, have been kidnapped by Iran. Masih Alinejad was to be the victim of a kidnapping conspiracy.

==== In Saudi Arabia ====
On November 4, 2017, Lebanese prime minister Saad Hariri was allegedly kidnapped by Saudi authorities during a visit to the kingdom. Hariri appeared on live television and announced his resignation as a result of Iranian threats and Iran's export of "devastation and chaos". This unusual announcement was exceptionally surprising to many throughout the Middle East, especially since Hariri had never before expressed such harsh accusations towards Iran - though the Islamic Republic had been heavily involved in Lebanese politics for decades, namely by creating and continuously funding and supporting various organizations such as Hezbollah.

It appears that the Saudi government attempted to use political kidnapping as a means to push the Lebanese state to take an aggressive stance vis à vis the Islamic Republic and to confront it directly, after years of avoiding direct action against Hezbollah terrorists who had effectively taken control over southern Lebanon.

=== In Latin America ===
Political kidnapping happened in Latin America before the 1970s, but it was then that the number of kidnappings accelerated.

According to the New York Times, "So far this year [August 1970], there have been at least 18 successful or attempted kidnappings in Latin America. Among Latin Americans, the victims have included a former President of Argentina, the Foreign Minister of Guatemala and the former Foreign Minister of Colombia. Among foreigners, the victims have included ambassadors, consuls, labor, commercial and military attaches and even consultants with no governmental positions." Kidnappings were used as a tactic by urban guerrilla fighters. Stated goals included release of political prisoners, for ransom, embarrassment of officials, and straining ties between countries.

==== Methodology ====
Often, though not exclusively, kidnappers attack while targets are travelling in cars. A car or truck carrying terrorist forces will force the target's car off the road, proceeding to hold them at gunpoint until they surrender. Frequently, cars used are stolen then abandoned, which hampers police investigations.

== Notable incidents ==
Notable Incidents. Asterisks indicate attempted kidnappings. Daggers indicate deaths as a result.
Person	Year	Location	Motive	How	Result	Main Article
Richard the Lion-Hearted (English king)	1192	Vienna, Austria	Ransom- $15 million demanded	While travelling through Vienna (returning from Third Crusade), Duke Leopold recognized him through his disguise. He was handed to Henry VI, and a ransom was demanded.	Ransom paid in 1194 by merchants of England	
Ion Perdicaris (Greek-American playboy) Cromwell Varley (Perdicaris's stepson)	1904, May 18	Perdicaris's Summer home, Tangier, Morocco	Demands of Sultan of Morocco by Ahmed al-Raisuni.	Ahmed al-Raisuni and a group of bandits took Perdicaris and his stepson from their house.	Multinational involvement, especially by the United States. Raisuni's demands were mostly met, and Perdicaris was released on June 24, 1904. He later said of Raisuni, "I do not regret having been his prisoner for some time".	Perdicaris affair
Chiang Kai-Shek	1936	China	Demand to create the Second United Front Chiang viewed the CCP as a greater threat than the invading Japan. His subordinates kidnapped him to demand a ceasefire between the KMT-CCP.		The Second United Front was created after two weeks of discussion. Chiang was kept under house arrest for many years after.	Xi'an Incident
Adolf Eichmann (High-ranking Nazi officer)	1960	Kidnapped from Argentina, brought to Israel	Nazi officer; brought to Israel to stand trial for crimes against humanity.		The Eichmann Trial was carried out.	Eichmann Trial
*†John Gordon Mein (US ambassador to Guatemala)	1968, August 28	Guatemala	Attempt at exchanging for Camilo Sanchez, a local guerilla leader	Attempted kidnapping. After Mein tried escaping, he was shot multiple times.	First US ambassador killed on the job. FAR (Rebel Armed Forces) claimed responsibility.	See: https://timesmachine.nytimes.com/timesmachine/1968/08/30/77094413.html https://timesmachine.nytimes.com/timesmachine/1968/08/29/90669093.html
Lieut. Col. Donald J. Crowley (US air attaché in the Dominican Republic)	1970, March 24	Santo Domingo, Dominican Republic		Kidnapped from polo field		
†Pedro Eugenio Aramburu (Argentinian president)	1970, May 29	Buenos Aires, Argentina		Kidnapped from own house by two Monteneros posing as army officers.		Pedro Eugenio Aramburu#Death
Daniel Pereira Manelli (Uruguayan judge)	1970, July 28					
Brigadier General Dozier	1981, December 17					Kidnapping of Brigadier General Dozier
Abílio dos Santos Diniz	1989, December	Brazil				Kidnapping of Abílio dos Santos Diniz
*Gretchen Whitmer (Governor of Michigan)	2020	Michigan, United States			Foiled by FBI arrests before planned date	Gretchen Whitmer kidnapping plot
*Masih Alinejad (Anti-Iran Activist)	2021	Brooklyn, New York			Foiled before planned date.	Masih Alinejad#Kidnapping plot

== Sources ==
- Peterson, Richard E. (1978). "Political Kidnapping: A New Risk in International Business". Interfaces. 8 (2).
- Price, Eric (2013). "Literature on Kidnapping for Ransom and for Political Concessions". Perspectives on Terrorism. 7 (2). Terrorism Research Initiative: 104–118. JSTOR 26296928.
- Cassidy, W. L. (1978). POLITICAL KIDNAPPING - AN INTRODUCTORY OVERVIEW.
- https://www.jstor.org/stable/25117137?seq=1
