= Abilio Diniz =

Brazilian businessman (1936–2024)

- Born: Abilio dos Santos Diniz; December 28, 1936; São Paulo, São Paulo, Brazil
- Died: February 18, 2024 (aged 87); São Paulo, São Paulo, Brazil
- Education: Fundação Getúlio Vargas; Columbia University; University of Dayton
- Occupations: chairman of BRF, businessman, Chairman of Península Participações, member of the board of directors of Carrefour France and Carrefour Brasil
- Children: 6, including Pedro Diniz

Abilio dos Santos Diniz (December 28, 1936 – February 18, 2024) was a Brazilian billionaire businessman. He was the chairman of the board of directors of Península Participações, chairman of the board of directors of BRF and member of the board of directors of both Carrefour Group and Carrefour Brasil. Through GPA, Diniz became one of the wealthiest individuals in Brazil. In 2016, Forbes ranked him 477th richest person in the world and 14th in Brazil.

In 2009, Época magazine named him one of the 100 most influential Brazilians of the year. He previously served as a partner of Companhia Brasileira de Distribuição, a distribution company which owns the brands Varejo Alimentar, Pão de Açúcar and Extra, wholesaler Assaí, and appliance company Ponto Frio (Globex). He was also a shareholder of Casas Bahia, through Globex S/A.

== Early life and education ==
Diniz was the first of the six children born to Floripes Pires and Valentim Diniz. His father, Valentim, was born in 1913 in the countryside of Portugal, and immigrated to Brazil in November 1929.

Diniz studied at Anglo-Latino school and Mackenzie high school. He graduated in 1959 from the School of Business Administration of Fundação Getúlio Vargas. In 1965, Diniz traveled to the United States to study marketing at Ohio University and Economics at Columbia University, in New York.

== Career ==
Diniz's father, Valentim Diniz, founded the company Pão de Açúcar in September 1948. Abilio Diniz began to work for his father at Doceria Pão de Açúcar at the age of 12. In April 1959, the same year he graduated from FGV in Business Administration, he partnered with his father to create the first Pão de Açúcar supermarket store, located on Brigadeiro Luiz Antônio Avenue, in São Paulo. In 1960, after the first store was established, Diniz traveled for four months throughout Europe and the United States to observe the operation of the retail sector abroad. The second Pão de Açúcar location on Maria Antonia Street, downtown São Paulo, was established in 1963. One year later, Pão de Açúcar acquired Quiko and Tip Top supermarkets. During the 60's and 70's, Grupo Pão de Açúcar was the first supermarket chain to set up a store in a shopping mall (Iguatemi, in São Paulo), to have a 24-hour pharmacy, and to set up a data processing center.

Diniz studied the operations of Paris-based Carrefour in 1967 after Luiz Carlos Bresser-Pereira, who worked at Pão de Açúcar, introduced him to Carrefour cofounder Marcel Fournier. Diniz was a co-founder of the Brazilian Association of Supermarkets in 1968. Inspired by the Carrefour hypermarket model, Diniz founded Jumbo, the first hypermarket in Brazil, in Santo André in 1971. In 1976 he acquired Eletroradiobraz, the second largest chain of supermarkets and hypermarkets in Brazil at the time. The company consisted of eight supermarkets, 26 hypermarkets, 16 stores and a warehouse.

In 1979, Diniz moved away from Pão de Açúcar and became part of the National Monetary Council at the urging of the Minister of Planning, Mario Henrique Simonsen. There, he coordinated the production of economic bulletins.

In 1989, Valentim asked Diniz to take over the leadership of Pão de Açúcar. Valentim remained part of the group's board of directors. In March 1990 the Collor government implemented an economic plan which put Pão de Açúcar on the verge of bankruptcy. Diniz implemented the practice "cut, concentrate and simplify" and made cuts across the company. He sold the building which had served as the company's headquarters since 1986 in 1992. The company, which had 626 stores in 1985, was reduced to 262 stores by 1992. However, family conflicts threatened the company. In an agreement signed in November 1993, Diniz was given the majority control of Grupo Pão de Açúcar. His parents received 36.5% of the company shares and his sister, Lucília, held 12% of the company shares. Diniz led Grupo Pão de Açúcar through an IPO in 1997 and it was listed on the New York Stock Exchange. It was the first 100% national controlled company to conduct a global stock issue (in Brazil, the United States and Europe). In 1999, the French group Casino acquired 24.5% of the voting capital of the group for $854 500 million. In 2000, Diniz transitioned the company into Companhia Brasileira de Distribuição, which became one of the largest retail chains in the country.

In 2005, Diniz sold a large stake to the French company Casino Group for an estimated $860 million and stepped down as CEO, but remained as chairman. In 2009, in one of the most expensive transactions of the Brazilian business history, Grupo Pão de Açúcar bought Casas Bahia from Samuel Klein, giving Abilio control of Pão de Açúcar, Casas Bahia, Ponto Frio and Extra Hipermercados. In 2012, Casino Group took control of Grupo Pão de Açúcar and Diniz no longer had operational functions within the group but remained as chairman.

In 2003, Diniz became a member of the Economic and Social Development Council, a group of civil representatives which advise the President of the Republic of Brazil.

In 2006, Diniz founded Península Participações, an investment company created to manage the assets of the Diniz family through private and liquid investments. He later became the chairman of the company's board of directors.

In April 2013, Diniz was elected as chairman of BRF. He helped lead the company through a broad restructuring. The company's profit went from R$700 million in 2012 to R$2.2 billion in 2014. The company's market value went from R$37 billion to R$55 billion.

In September 2013, Diniz signed an agreement with his partner Jean-Charles Naouri to leave Grupo Pão de Açúcar. His shares were converted into voting privileges and he resigned from his position as chairman and the position was filled by Naouri.

Diniz changed his focus to Península Participações, which managed more than 10 billion reais in assets by 2014. Through Peninsula Participaçoes, he invested $84M USD in the education technology company Descomplica. In April 2015, Diniz announced he was wrapping up talks to raise his 5.07 percent stake in Carrefour and that he had shareholder support to take a seat on the board of the supermarket. Through Península Participações, Diniz acquired 10% of the shares of Carrefour Brazil. Península Participações continued to acquire shares of Carrefour, and by March 2016, it was the third largest global shareholder of the Carrefour chain. In 2017, it had 11.46% of the shares of Carrefour Brasil and 7.7% of Carrefour. Diniz served on the group's board of directors.

== Writing ==
In 2004, Diniz released the book Caminhos e Escolhas – O caminho para uma vida mais feliz (Paths and Choices – Smart Choices for a Successful Life), which discusses major moments in his life and the transformations he went through as a result.

In 2015, journalist Cristiane Correa wrote the book Abilio – Determinado, Ambicioso, Polêmico (Determined, Ambitious, and Controversial), released by publisher Sextante, which details his life from childhood to becoming one of the biggest businessmen of Brazil. The book discussed Diniz's departure from Grupo Pão de Açúcar and his career after the departure.

In October 2016, Diniz launched his second book, Novos Caminhos, Novas Escolhas (New Paths, New Choices), released by publisher Objetiva (Companhia das Letras Group), which discussed the transitions in his life over the previous 12 years. In March 2017 the French version of the book was released, and later an English version was sold in the American market.

== Controversies ==
In August 2011, Diniz was notified by the Federal Public Ministry of Brazil to give explanations in a criminal investigation. Diniz's next move was to then call criminal lawyer Marcio Thomaz Bastos, one of the most well-known criminal lawyers for those who had wealth. At this time, Diniz was president of the board of directors for Pão de Açúcar. During the 2010 elections, the offices of Bastos had helped Diniz pay 5.5 million reais, to congressman Antonio Palocci to help fund the presidential campaign of Dilma Rousseff.

After the discovery of contracts, drafts, notes, emails and other internal documents by TIME story, which all aimed to justify the payments to Palocci, the company GPA decided to establish an audit team to investigate the money given to Palocci in attempt to set things right. Two months after this, the audit team found no evidence that states Palocci aided the group whatsoever, giving the notion of corruption in this particular case.

Publicly available information confirms that Península Participações invests in Carrefour. Carrefour has been facing negative publicity due to its lack of a clear plan for transitioning to 100% cage-free eggs across all its global locations. Given the cruel conditions on battery cage farms and the health risks associated with eggs produced in such systems, the European Union banned caged farming through the European Union Council Directive 1999/74/EC, which took effect in 2012.

== Kidnapping ==
In December 1989, Diniz was the victim of an economical kidnapping, followed by a police rescue. He was confined for six days in a small space under a house, with a duct leading to the kitchen fan as his only source of oxygen.

The kidnapping took place in the morning of the Brazilian presidential elections in Brazil in 1989.

Among the kidnappers were Canadians David Spencer and Christine Lamont, who were students at Simon Fraser University in British Columbia and communist activists.

Lamont and Spencer denied any participation in the kidnapping, but their participation was proved when a secret weapons cache in Managua exploded (among the material exposed by the explosion were documents that linked both Lamont and Spencer to the Diniz kidnapping). Faced with these revelations, Lamont admitted that they had been involved in the kidnapping.

Lamont and Spencer were sentenced to 28 years in prison for their involvement, but were kept in private cells, away from the mass of the prison population. The Canadian press and public started a major movement to secure their release, straining relations between Brazil and Canada. However, two Canadian investigative journalists, Isabel Vincent of The Globe and Mail and Caroline Mallan of the Toronto Star, wrote books concluding that Lamont and Spencer were likely guilty, and they were being treated well by Brazilian authorities. Lamont confessed to involvement in the kidnapping, which was meant to raise money for Sandinista guerrillas, and the two were released and deported to Canada in 1996.

== Death ==
Diniz died at a São Paulo hospital on 18 February 2024, at the age of 87, after suffering respiratory failure as a result of pneumonitis.

== See also ==
- List of kidnappings
- Lists of solved missing person cases
