= Samuel Klein (businessman) =

Polish-Brazilian business magnate and philanthropist

- Born: 15 November 1923; Zaklików, Polish Republic
- Died: 20 November 2014 (aged 91); São Paulo, Brazil
- Citizenship: Brazilian
- Years active: 1952–2014
- Known for: Founding Casas Bahia, philanthropy
- Website: Official website

Samuel Klein (15 November 1923 – 20 November 2014) was a Polish-Brazilian business magnate and philanthropist who founded the Casas Bahia chain of department stores in Brazil, building them into the top retailer in the country, and making him known in the 1990s as the "Sam Walton of Brazil". In 2013, Forbes ranked him 78th richest person in Brazil with a personal net worth of $835 million, while his son, Michael, was ranked 87th with $723 million.

Following his death in 2014 Klein has faced numerous accusations of sex trafficking, rape and exploitation of minors.

== Life and work ==
=== Early life ===
Klein was born in Zaklików, Poland, the third of nine children. At 19, Klein worked as a joiner at the time of the Nazi German invasion of Poland in World War II, when he was taken to the Maidanek concentration camp along with his father. His mother and five younger siblings were sent to the extermination camp of Treblinka. He was later transported to Auschwitz in 1944. He escaped from the soldiers on 22 July 1944; in his own words, "I didn't know where I was going, but I was certain to get far from the group." He spent the night in the fields, where some Christian Poles, also fugitives, helped him flee. He managed to return to his old house, which was occupied by local Poles, who told him "that's what happens in war times, what is your today becomes someone else's tomorrow", and called a police officer claiming Samuel was invading his property which led him to spend a night in custody. Samuel worked on a small farm in the area in exchange for food and room.

After the war, he reunited with the remaining of his family, sisters Sezia, Esther and his brother Solomon. The Klein brothers then went to Germany, and were able to find their father Suk'her alive. Klein lived in Munich, West Germany, until 1951, where he met Chana, his future wife.

=== Brazil and Casas Bahia ===
Klein's father went to Brazil, together with his sister Esther. He himself wanted to emigrate to the United States, but the immigration quota was full. So he joined his father and sister, making his way to Brazil via Bolivia, and settled with his family in São Caetano do Sul in greater São Paulo.

In 1952, he began working as a peddler, selling sheets, tablecloths, and towels door to door using a buggy. After five years, in 1957, he had accumulated sufficient capital to open his first shop in downtown São Caetano do Sul, which he called "Casa Bahia". The name was an homage to his patrons, the majority of whom were migrant workers from the northeast state of Bahia. Today, there are more than 500 of these stores with over 23 million customers, making Casas Bahia the largest warehouse distributor in Latin America.

=== Economic success and recent work ===
The rapid growth of the organization, and Klein's role in building it into a regional economic force were the subject of one of the case studies in C. K. Prahalad's Fortune at the Bottom of the Pyramid.

Klein guarded the company's finances, keeping control of all expenses within his immediate family, although in 1997 he opened the company's books to the public to secure promissory notes for the year. He later passed control of Casas Bahia to his son Michael, who was its CEO as of 2009, and retired in Brazil. In 2009, Samuel Klein sold Casas Bahia to Grupo Pão de Açúcar. Via Varejo was soon formed through the mergers of Casas Bahia with Ponto Frio and Extra Eletro, both owned by Grupo Pão de Açúcar. The Klein family owned a 47% stake in Via Varejo, which is worth $2 billion today.

Since 2010, Michael Klein has served as the Chairman of the Board of Directors of Via Varejo, while Michael's son, Raphael Oscar Klein, has served as a member of the board of directors.

In May 2013, it was announced that the Klein family was planning to sell 16% of their stake in Via Varejo. In September 2013, Klein's 81.1 million shares of Via Varejo (25.1% stake) have been transferred to his heirs. 53.7 million common shares of the family's stake have begun trading on December 16, 2013. Via Varejo raised R$ 2.845 billion through a public offering of shares. Three quarters of the amount raised went to the Klein family, while the rest went to GPA. Ownership of the company has changed to GPA with 43.3%, the Klein family with 27.3%, and minority shareholders with 29.3%.

In July 2014, Grupo CB, the Klein family's holding company chaired by Michael Klein, purchased a real estate fund from BR Properties for R$606.65 million. The fund includes 26 C&A stores, a Brooksfield store, a Sendas store, a call centre, and offices on Paulista Avenue in downtown São Paulo, totaling 118,000 square meters of commercial space. Grupo CB currently holds a real estate portfolio of 420 properties worth R$4.6 billion in total, including stores, industrial warehouses, administrative complexes, offices and distribution centers, totaling over 2 million square meters of commercial space.

In a compilation of the 60 most powerful people of Brazil, iG ranked Klein 19th. He died on 20 November 2014, aged 91, of respiratory failure at the Albert Einstein Hospital.

=== Accusations of sex trafficking, rape, and exploitation of minors ===
In December 2020, the website UOL had access to court proceedings that revealed that Samuel Klein used the cash register of Casas Bahia stores to pay underage girls for sexual acts.

In April 2021, the investigative journalism website Agência Publica published a story covering Samuel Klein's alleged sex crimes, which in Brazilian law include rape of a vulnerable person and the crime of exploitation of a vulnerable person. The girls, who were underage, found out that Samuel Klein compensated girls and their families with money and products, and sought him out, trought contacts with other girls that were being abused. In some cases, Klein himself sought out the teenagers, distributing money in low-income neighborhoods in order to lure the underage girls. The crimes took place in Casas Bahia's headquarters and in several of the businessman's properties. The victims, after the sexual abuse, would receive money and products from Casas Bahia. In many cases, the girls went to Casas Bahia stores with tickets, and with their mothers, signed by Samuel Klein himself, causing embarrassing situations for the employees.

Káthia Lemos, accused by the report of being one of the groomers of underage girls for Samuel Klein, says that she actually acted to get poor women whom the businessman did not want to stop offering themselves in return for presents or monetary benefits. She also says that according to her knowledge she never dealt with any underage girls in any of these alleged cases.

A lawyer heard by Agência Pública says that he closed a court settlement, with a confidentiality pact, where the case contained videos that proved Samuel Klein's sex crimes. The settlement ended in monetary compensation to the victims and destruction of the evidence. Other lawsuits against Samuel Klein have had similar outcomes, with compensation for the victims. Only one case is still pending, awaiting trial by the Superior Court of Justice.

Via Varejo, the holding company controlling Casas Bahia, in response to Agência Pública, said, "We clarify that the Klein family has never exercised any controlling role in Via Varejo, the holding company formed in 2011 to manage the Casas Bahia, Pontofrio, Extra.com.br and Bartira brands. [...] We vehemently repudiate any and all types of harassment, illegal practices and discriminatory acts on our premises, including our administrative headquarters and our stores."

In May 2021 it was reported that the São Bernardo do Campo Labor Prosecutor's Office (MPT Sao Bernado do Campo) had been carrying out a civil inquiry to investigate possible responsibilities of the Casas Bahia company over the allegations.

In July 2021 Agência Pública released a story going deeper into the accusations which showed the alleged child abuse by Klein had lasted from 1983 to 2013 according to testimonials.

== Private life ==
His grand-daughter Natalie Klein works in fashion.
