= Valêncio =

Valêncio is a name. Notable people with this name include:

- Flávio Alex Valêncio (born 1983), Brazilian football player
- Valêncio Xavier (1933–2008), Brazilian writer and TV director

== See also ==
- Valencia (disambiguation)
