= Grupo Casas Bahia =

Brazilian retail company founded in 2010

Grupo Casas Bahia S.A.
- Formerly: Globex Utilidades S.A. (2010-2012); Via Varejo S.A. (2012-2021); Via S.A (2022-2023)
- Type: Sociedade Anónima
- Traded as: B3: BHIA3; Ibovespa Component
- Industry: Retail
- Founded: 2010; 16 years ago
- Founder: Grupo Pão de Açúcar
- Headquarters: São Paulo, Brazil
- Number of locations: 1073
- Area served: Brazil
- Key people: Roberto Fulcherberguer, (Chairman); Renato Franklin (president); Raphael Oscar Klein, (CEO)
- Revenue: ▲ R$ 29.8 billion (2019)
- Net income: ▼ R$ (479) million (2019)
- Number of employees: 52,168 (2016)
- Parent: Mapa Capital (2025-present, 85%)
- Subsidiaries: Bartira; Casas Bahia; Extra.com.br; Ponto
- Website: www.grupocasasbahia.com.br

Grupo Casas Bahia (formerly known as Via and Via Varejo) is a Brazilian retail company founded in 2010 through the merger of retail companies Casas Bahia, owned by the Klein family, and Ponto, owned by Grupo Pão de Açúcar (GPA).

== History ==
In December 2009, Grupo Pão de Açúcar purchased Casas Bahia and transferred its retail units to Globex Utilidades SA, Ponto Frio's parent company which was purchased by the group in June earlier that year.

From the following year, it began operating Nova Pontocom, an e-commerce company that reached an 18% market share in Brazilian online retail. In early 2012, Globex Utilidades officially changed its corporate name to Via Varejo.

In May 2013, it was announced that the Klein family is planning to sell as much as R$ 2 billion (16%) worth of their stake in the company through an IPO. 53.7 million common shares of the family's stake began trading on December 16, 2013.

Through the public offering of shares, Via Varejo raised R$ 2.845 billion, with three-quarters of the amount transferred to the Klein family and the remainder to GPA. Ownership of the company has changed to GPA with 43.3%, the Klein family with 27.3%, and minority shareholders with 29.3%.

In October 2013, it was announced that Via Varejo will acquire the remaining 75% stake of Móveis Bartira, an exclusive provider of furniture for Casas Bahia and Ponto Frio, founded by Samuel Klein in 1962.

In June 2014, Cnova Brazil, a global e-commerce company with a total gross merchandise volume of $4.9 billion, was created through a joint venture between Casino, GPA, Via Varejo and Exito. Cnova Brazil will be directly owned 46.5% by Casino (including its subsidiary Exito) and 53.5% indirectly by GPA, Via Varejo and certain founding shareholders of Nova Pontocom.

In June 2019, it was announced that the Klein family became the largest shareholder of Via Varejo with a 27% stake, after GPA sold its entire stake. On September 20, 2023, the company rebranded to Grupo Casas Bahia.

In August 2025, it was announced that Mapa Capital acquired R$1.6 billion in debt from the group and converted it into shares. This made it its largest shareholder, with an 85% stake.

In August 2026, Casas Bahia filed for bankruptcy after reporting further losses in Q2 2026, reportedly losing 10.1 billion reais (US$1.92 billion) in 2026. As a result, the company immediately closed 298 stores while it tries to secure a way to restructure its debt.

== Operations ==
Before becoming part of Cnova Brasil, the group's online operations were part of a company called Nova Pontocom. It was formed in 2010 from the merger of the online retail operations of Casas Bahia, Ponto Frio, and Extra, a hypermarket chain owned by GPA. With a 21.9% stake held by Via Varejo when it was founded, Cnova Brazil operated the following online stores: Extra.com.br, Casasbahia.com.br, and Pontofrio.com.

As of July 2020, the company has 1073 stores in Brazil, distributed under the brands Casas Bahia with 857 stores and Ponto Frio with 216 stores. The state with the largest number of Casas Bahia and Ponto Frio stores is São Paulo, with 358 and 59 stores respectively.
