= Mesbla =

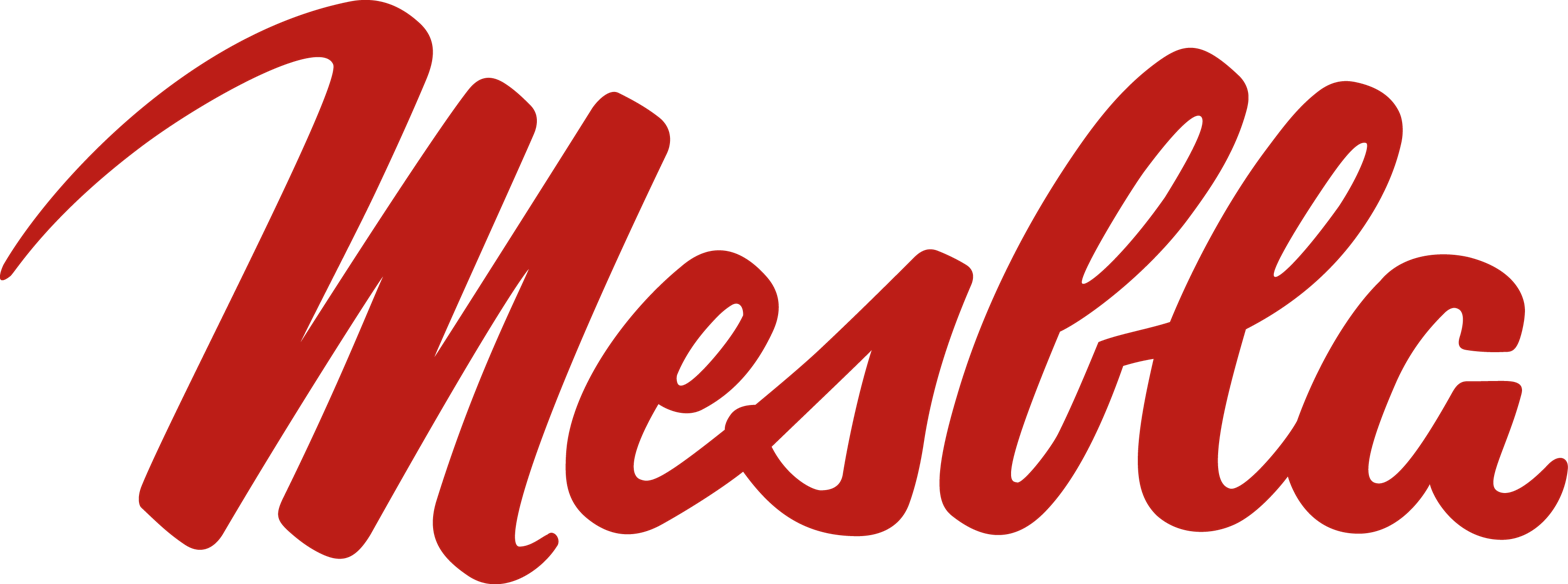
- Company type: Private
- Industry: Retail
- Founded: Rio de Janeiro (1912)
- Defunct: 1999
- Headquarters: Rio de Janeiro, Brazil

Mesbla S.A. was a chain of Brazilian department stores that began operations in 1912 as a subsidiary of a French firm, and had its bankruptcy declared in 1999.

== History ==
=== The beginning ===
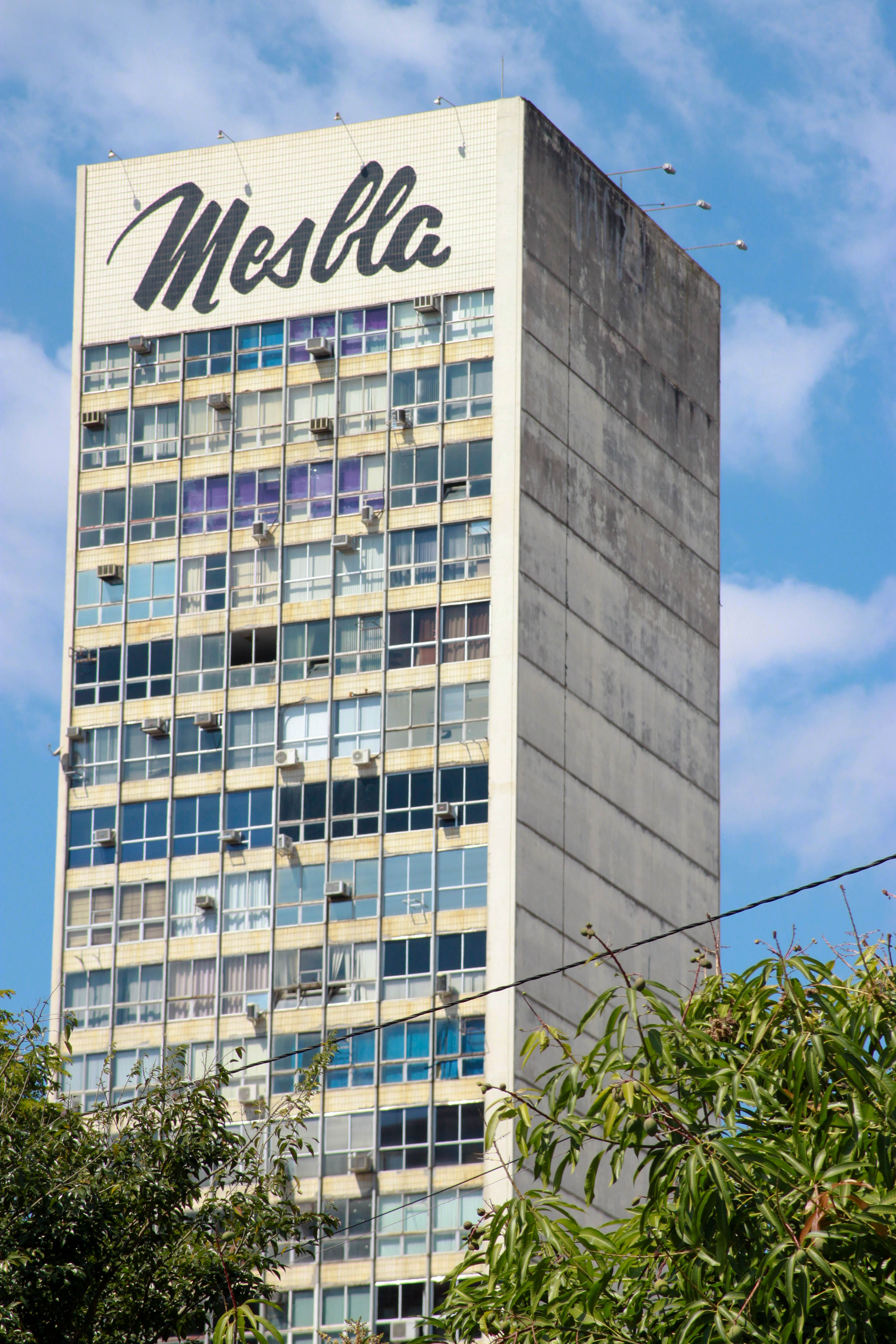
Mesbla Building

In the building number 83 of the Assembleia street, in the city center of Rio de Janeiro, was installed in 1912 a subsidiary of the firm Mestre & Blatgé, based in Paris and specialized in the trading of machinery and equipment.

The Brazilian subsidiary had little importance within the French organization throughout the world. Four years after its installation, its administration was handed over to French Louis La Saigne, previously deputy manager of the branch in Buenos Aires. In 1924, La Saigne transformed the Rio establishment in an autonomous firm, with the name Sociedade Anônima Brasileira Estabelecimentos Mestre et Blatgé, which in 1939 changed its name to Mesbla S.A. The new name was a combination of the first syllables of the original name, which was suggested by the secretary of Louis La Saigne, Isaura, through an internal competition. The concern was that at the beginning of World War II France has expressed solidarity to Adolf Hitler, which could lead to reprisals in Brazil with reference to the name.

La Saigne had four daughters, and the oldest married Henrique de Botton. After a day of hard work, Louis La Saigne, the founder of Mesbla, died at his residence on the night of January 18, 1961. With his death were elected president and vice president two of his older employees, respectively, Silvano Santos Cardoso and Henrique de Botton. In the following year, on August 12, 1962, Mesbla celebrated its Golden Jubilee already as a genuinely Brazilian company, with more than 8 000 employees operating in 13 branches, retail stores and sales agencies established in strategic parts of the country. After the death of Silvano Santos Cardoso on February 29, 1968, Henrique became president, and after Henrique's death, his son André also took office. Both led the expansion and the decline of the company until the 1980s. In the 1950s, the company had stores located in major cities in the country and in some countryside towns. In the 1980s Mesbla had 180 outlets and employed 28 000 people. Their large stores, with areas with rarely less than 3 000 square meters, were landmarks in the cities where Mesbla was present.

For nearly three decades reigned virtually alone in the retail market, being the only company in the genre with nationwide coverage. Employees took pride in stating that Mesbla just did not sell coffins, which are for the dead; for the living they had all the goods, from buttons to cars, boats and airplanes.

=== Reformulation in the 1980s ===
However, the expansion of Mesbla was made with market strategies that soon proved to be outdated. When it decided to increase the sale of clothing and bed and table linen, the articles were exposed next to machines and equipment, traditional goods of the company. The same disorganized mixture was seen in catalogs.

Also the company purchases from suppliers had failures. For example, as soon as the Brazil resumed diplomatic relations with the Soviet Union, in the government of João Goulart, Mesbla imported from that country a large quantity of cameras and low-quality video cameras. As imports did not have continuity, Mesbla found itself in difficulties to provide technical assistance for the goods sold.

The red light came in 1981, when the Mesbla went from the first to the third place between the largest retail companies in Brazil and started to face a stronger competition. A marketing consulting firm was hired, and Mesbla stores have undergone a complete overhaul, with changes in the decoration of shops, arrangement of windows, salespeople uniforms and customer communication. It also started to take better care of advertising, presenting catalogs in color and well maintained ads for television. Attracted the best executives in the market, offering good salaries.

In addition to department stores, it had its own premises for sale of furniture, cars, boats, and a financial institution. It also worked in international trade through a subsidiary company, which had a branch in New York City. Among the several million-dollar deals made by Mesbla International Trade, one was highlighted even in The New York Times: the selling of 60 000 trucks to China, a deal that worth 900 million dollars. In 1986 it was chosen by the magazine Exame, specialized in economics and business, as the best company in Brazil.

André de Botton was consecrated as the retail king. His name was part of the quartet that formed the corporate nobility of the 1970s and 1980s, supplemented by Octavio Lacombe, from the Paranapanema Group, Olavo Monteiro de Carvalho, from Monteiro Aranha and Augusto Trajano, from Caemi. In addition to offices of large corporations and the offices of ministers and politicians in Brasilia, they circulated the spheres of Rio de Janeiro high society of the time. De Botton was chosen twice as the Foreign Retailer of the Year by the American organization National Retail Federation.

=== Problems in the 1990s ===
Despite these strategy changes, some problems persisted. Mesbla had forty directors, making the decisions slow. At the end of the Sarney administration in 1989, the board, believing that the country was heading to an hyperinflation, began to stock excess goods and basically relied on funds generated by its financial institute.

The advent of the Plano Real, with the end of high inflation, showed the weaknesses of Mesbla, and the company began to face constant losses, which it tried to solve with closing stores and dismissal of employees. Compounding, it had to face competition from foreign department stores and hypermarkets, with ease of raising capital abroad at lower interest rates.

Foreign companies conquered the clientele with better purchasing power, always attentive to news, with a greater variety of goods and installment credit facilities, in particular with the creation of own credit cards. When Mesbla tried to match with the competitors, creating unique brands of clothes and its own credit card, it was too late. In the year 1994 it had closed several stores and reduced its staff to 4 500 employees, unable to stem the losses.

=== Mansur and the end ===
In 1997, with debts of more than one billion reais, it filed for bankruptcy. In the same year, the shareholder control of Mesbla was acquired by the businessman Ricardo Mansur, who scooped 51% of the shares by 600 million reais, to be paid in ten years, and taking the tax debt of 350 million reais of the bankrupt. Nine months before he had bought the Mappin stores, traditional São Paulo state retail company. He intended to merge the two companies, making them profitable and resell them with profit.

Controversial businessman, Mansur, owner of dairy companies and a bank, was known both for his aggressive style as for his taste for ostentation. He maintains a mansion in London, where sponsors a polo team, to which he provides thoroughbred horses of his own creation. To fulfill the wishes of a daughter, he commissioned from a renowned architect from São Paulo a dollhouse, worth 300 000 dollars, which was installed on his farm in Indaiatuba.

In an attempt to save the Mesbla and Mappin, Mansur put companies ahead of the executive João Paulo Amaral. But João Paulo soon realized that he was on one of those missions regarded as impossible. The lack of money was more serious than previously thought; the delays in the payment of suppliers, chronic. Then began a series of bankruptcy filings, and eviction threats in every mall where the shops displayed their brands.

Mansur tried to use his influence with the politicians and even the pressure of the Mesbla and Mappin employees, through marches, to get money from the Brazilian Development Bank, a public bank. At the same time, he sought some foreign group interested in acquiring the stores. His credibility, however, began to be questioned when he began to spread false information to complete the deal. At the same time, the administration of his bank began to be investigated and fraudulent practices have been qualified, which resulted in its liquidation. Because of these practices, Mansur was arrested and had his assets blocked. A new arrest warrant was made by his ex-wife, for who he did not pay child support.

With so many problems, Mansur lost interest in the fate of Mesbla and Mappin. He flew to London and never returned to Brazil. The bankruptcy of both companies was enacted in July 1999, and the last Mesbla store to close its doors was the branch of Niterói on August 24, 1999.

At the same time, Lojas Brasileiras and G. Aronson ended their activities, two retail companies of national capital. Since then, the Brazilian retail market had to compete with foreign companies.

In 2009, it was advertised the comeback of Mesbla: an e-commerce company negotiated the purchase of name usage rights with Mansur and intended to open a site aimed at women in March 2010, with official launch in May of the same year. "The brand still has a positive appeal among consumers", evaluated a company director. According to columnist Mônica Bergamo, in the edition of Folha de S.Paulo of June 3, 2009, the former owner of Mesbla, Ricardo Mansur, would have gone to New York City to accelerate contacts to advance the fastest possible the reopening of Mesbla, however, the initiative did not yield results.
