= João Batista Calixto de Jesus =

Brazilian Artist

João Batista Calixto de Jesus (1922–1994) was a Brazilian artist. A lifelong native of São Paulo, he studied at the São Paulo School of Fine Arts. He was known for his decorative work in several major churches of São Paulo, and for his work in advertising and graphic design. He taught at the Panamericana Escola de Arte e Design and at the São Paulo School of Fine Arts. His work is exhibited at the Museu Belas Artes de São Paulo among others. He died in 1994.
