= Elvis (footballer, born 1986) =

Brazilian footballer (born 1986)

Personal information
- Full name: Elvis Johnny Correa
- Date of birth: 19 March 1986 (age 40)
- Place of birth: São Paulo, Brazil
- Position: Midfielder

Senior career*
Years	Team	Apps	(Gls)
2007	Rio Branco-PR	3	(0)
2007	Paraná	2	(0)
2008	Viborg FF	0	(0)
2009	Paranavaí	24	(7)
2009	Juventude	10	(0)
2010–	Criciúma		
- * Club domestic league appearances and goals

Elvis Johnny Correa (born 19 March 1986) is a Brazilian football player who plays for Criciúma Esporte Clube.

== Career ==
Elvis has played for Paraná in the Campeonato Brasileiro and Rio Branco-PR in the Copa do Brasil. Elvis joined Danish Superliga side Viborg FF in January 2008, but did not appear in any league matches for the club.
