= Kidnapping of Abilio Diniz =

Kidnapping

In December 1989, Brazilian billionaire businessman Abilio Diniz was the victim of a kidnapping, that took place on the day of the first Brazilian democratic presidential elections after a military dictatorship. His kidnapping was meant to raise money for Sandinista guerrillas.

It was followed by an almost immediate police rescue that revealed that among the kidnappers were Chileans, Argentinians and two Canadians: David Spencer and Christine Lamont, both students at Simon Fraser University in British Columbia.

The candidates were Luiz Inácio Lula da Silva, founding member of the Workers' Party (Partido dos trabalhadores - PT), and Fernando Collor de Mello, the right wing party candidate running for a newly formed National Reconstruction Party (Partido da reconstrução nacional - PRN). As there was a prohibition of any political party of talking to the media; television, radio or newspapers, on the days prior to election day, Luiz Inácio Lula da Silva's party had no opportunity to clarify the accusations that the party (PT) was involved in the kidnapping.

== Kidnapping ==
The kidnapping took place in the morning of the Brazilian presidential election in Brazil in 1989 when the candidates were Luiz Inácio Lula da Silva, founding member of the Workers' Party, and Fernando Collor de Mello, the right wing party candidate running for a newly formed National Reconstruction Party, backed by the richest man in Alagoas, senator João Lyra, who reportedly gave up to $16 million to help elect Collor.

When arrested, the kidnappers characterized themselves as members of a left-wing group.

In June 1989, two Canadians David Spencer and Christine Lamont joined the kidnap-gang. They used their Canadian passports and contacts to rent a number of apartments in preparation for the next victim, the principal shareholder of Brazil's largest supermarket chain, Abilio Diniz. In December 1989 Diniz was dragged out of his Mercedes-Benz as he was on his way to work and then bundled into a station wagon disguised as an ambulance. At the safe-house, he was kept in a small underground cell and subjected to loud music to break his will. While the family of Diniz was negotiating payment of a $5 million ransom, the police stormed the house in São Paulo where he was held. This was based on a tip from a neighbor who complained that the music coming from the building was too loud. In fact, it was being used to break his will, but Diniz had requested it be turned up higher, which ultimately saved him. Diniz was freed and ten people were arrested. The police arrested five Chileans, two Argentines, a Brazilian, along with the two Canadians Spencer and Lamont. Chilean police were later able to confirm that three of the Chileans are members of the Movement of the Revolutionary Left:

- Ulises Gallardo Acevedo - Movement of the Revolutionary Left cadre
- Pedro Fernandes Lembach - an explosives expert, was secretary of Chile's National Council of Political Prisoners while he was in jail in Chile.
- Maria Emilia Badilla - spent 10 years in jail in Chile for subversive activities.

== The Canadians ==
=== David Spencer ===
David Spencer was born in 1963 (age 62–63) in Moncton, New Brunswick. A university dropout who moved to Vancouver in the 1980s where he found work at an alternate radio station. There he met Christine Lamont, a student at Simon Fraser University. The two soon became supporters of the Sandinista movement in Nicaragua and became members of Committee in Solidarity with the People of El Salvador. In 1989, using false passports, the two traveled to Managua, the capital of Nicaragua making contact with various left wing groups including the Farabundo Martí National Liberation Front (FMLN). They spent six months in Managua, supposedly, as translators for a Spanish newspaper.

=== Christine Lamont ===
Christine Lamont was born in 1959 (age 66–67) in Langley, British Columbia and a student at Simon Fraser University (SFU) in the late 1980s. During her time at SFU she worked at CFRO-FM, a community radio station, where she met David Spencer. The two became involved in Latin American solidarity activism, supporting left-wing movements like the Sandinistas in Nicaragua and FMLN guerrillas in El Salvador. In 1989, using false passports, the two traveled to Managua, the capital of Nicaragua. They spent six months in Managua, supposedly, as translators for a Spanish newspaper.

=== Trial and aftermath ===
In 1990, the two were both sentenced to 28 years in prison for kidnapping. Both Lamont and Spencer professed that they were innocent victims and had no involvement in the kidnapping. Their plight became a cause célèbre in Canada and led to a strain in relations between Canada and Brazil. The couple were able to garner a lot of support from family, fellow Canadians, the news media and the Canadian government. Lamont's parents were very active in gaining support for the two and apparently spent thousands of dollars support trying to win their freedom.

While both Lamont and Spencer stated they were innocent, there were several inconsistencies with their story. First, trial transcripts show that the two had rented two houses in São Paulo using false passports and letters of reference. One of these houses was later used to house Diniz. Secondly, these transcripts state that Spencer had obtained the materials the cell later used to house Diniz. Finally, they also state that Spencer had actually participated in guarding the kidnap victim.

Lamont and Spencer continued to maintain their innocence, however, their story started to unravel four years later when a secret weapons cache in Managua exploded (the Sandinistas had lost power by this point). Among the material exposed by the explosion were documents that linked both Lamont and Spencer to the Diniz kidnapping. Faced with these revelations, Lamont admitted that they had been involved in the kidnapping.

=== Release ===
Lamont and Spencer continued to battle the Brazilian government in an effort to be deported back to Canada. In November 1998 after a hunger strike by the pair, the Brazilian government accused them of violating "good behaviour" and refused to release them to Canadian authorities. That decision was soon reversed, and on November 21, 1998 they landed in Abbotsford, British Columbia and were immediately taken to a local prison. Two years later the pair was granted full parole.

== See also ==
- Sergio Apablaza
- Isabel Vincent, See No Evil. Reed Books Canada, 1996
- Caroline Mallan, Wrong Time, Wrong Place? Key Porter Books, 1996
