= Sendas (supermarket) =

Supermarket

Sendas Distribuidora S.A.
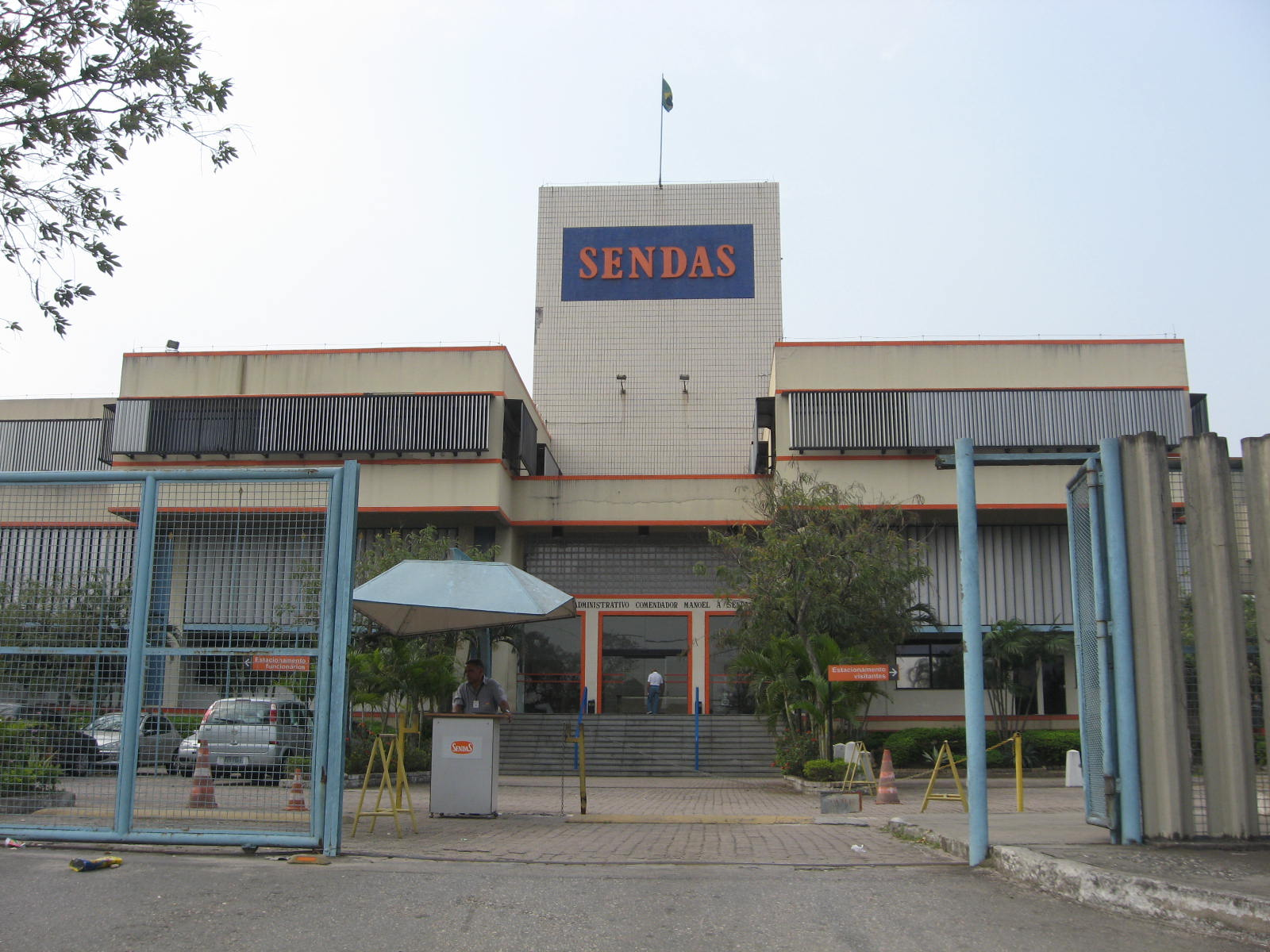
- Formerly: Casas Sendas Comércio e Indústria Ltda.
- Type: Subsidiary
- Industry: Retail
- Parent: Grupo Pão de Açúcar

Sendas (originally Casas Sendas Comércio e Indústria Ltda., currently Sendas Distribuidora S.A.) was a supermarket chain in the Brazilian state of Rio de Janeiro, currently owned by Grupo Pão de Açúcar.

Prior to the Pão de Açúcar takeover (originally a "partnership", now Sendas is a wholly owned subsidiary of the group), Sendas owned Sendas supermarkets, Bon Marché hypermarkets and Casa Show home improvement stores. After the transaction, Bon Marché stores were rebranded as Extra Bon Marché (part of Extra Hipermercados), and Casa Show was spun off (though some Casa Show stores still are annex to Pão de Açúcar and Extra stores).

Currently, Sendas can be described as the Rio equivalent to the CompreBem banner, based in "neighborhood stores". However, ABC CompreBem stores, owned by Pão de Açúcar, are also seen in the state.
