= Museum of Fine Arts of São Paulo =

University museum located in São Paulo, Brazil

- Museu Belas Artes de São Paulo
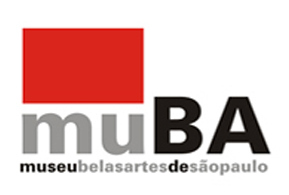
- Established: 2007
- Location: Brazil
- Coordinates: 23°35′22″S 46°38′24″W
- Key holdings: Centro Universitário Belas Artes de São Paulo
- Website: www.muba.com.br
- Location of Museum of Fine Arts of São Paulo

The Museum of Fine Arts of São Paulo (MuBA) is a university museum located in the neighborhood of Vila Mariana, in the city of São Paulo, Brazil. It opened on September 23, 2007 and was officially registered on April 14, 2008. The museum is connected to the Fine Arts University Center of São Paulo (commonly known as "Fine Arts"), a private institution of higher learning, and is sustained through the School of Fine Arts Foundation of São Paulo (FEBASP).

The museum aims at the conservation, documentation, study, and exhibition of the collection of art and history saved since 1925 through the university center when it was founded under the denomination of the Academy of Fine Arts of São Paulo. As a university museum, it also acts in the promotion and dissemination of the scientific production and cultural production of Fine Arts, organizing temporary exhibitions and various educational activities.

== History ==
The origin of the collection preserved by the Fine Arts Museum of São Paulo predates the establishment of the institution in 2007 by more than eight decades. The collection began to be formed after the founding of the Academy of Fine Arts in São Paulo, the oldest college specializing in the artistic education of the state capital, established in 1925. Created by the Gaucho politician, writer and musician Pedro Augusto Gomes Cardim, also founder of the Dramatic and Musical Conservatory of São Paulo and Paulista Academy of Letters, and established with the support of intellectuals such as Mário de Andrade and Menotti Del Picchia, the Academy was of great importance for the development of the São Paulo artistic environment at the beginning of the twentieth century when the incipient local artistic learning system was still largely based on informality.

Installed at first in a house on Rua Bento Freitas, in the neighborhood of Vila Buarque, the Academy of Fine Arts began to offer courses of painting and sculpture and engraving in 1925 and, three years later, the first autonomous superior course in architecture in the state of São Paulo. Since 1927, it began to organize periodic expositions of student work. The works acquired or donated during these exhibitions, as well as works performed didactic actives or to obtain an academic degree, constituted the first formative aspect of the collection. It also comprised a collection of replicas of famous sculptures and plaster pieces, used as models for copy studies.

In 1932, by virtue of the state decree, the institution, renamed the School of Fine Arts of São Paulo, became responsible for managing the collection of the Pinacoteca de Estado. The two institutions were closely linked during most of the 1930s, a period in which they also shared the same building, on Rua Onze de Agosto, and the same director, Paulo Vergueiro Lopes de Leão. The School of Fine Arts also had a major influence on the organization of the first editions of Salão Paulista de Belas Artes, in which several of its graduates took part. The administrative bond between the School of Fine Arts and the Pinacoteca do Estado was broken in 1939 when a reform of the São Paulo executive power organization chart restored the museum's status as an autonomous organ. Nevertheless, both would continue to share the same space after being transferred to the old building of the Lyceum of Arts and Crafts of São Paulo in the Jardim da Luz.

The proximity of the state art collection to the Pinacoteca of the State would alleviate the deficiency resulting from the lack of an own art gallery that served as a reference to didactic activities. Still, the School of Fine Arts maintained its intention to create art galleries, with works of students and pensioners, copies, reproductions and anything else necessary for the development of teaching', as stated in its regulations. The exhibitions of student works would continue in the Lyceum building. At the same time, the institution's collection grew through the sporadic acquisition of works and donations from students and teachers.

In the 1980s, then called the Faculty of Fine Arts, the school began the process of transferring to its current facilities in Vila Mariana, completed in 1985. On the new campus, it expanded its area of activity by the opening of the design, social communication and international relations. Consequently, it also diversified the collection (then under the custody of the Luciano Octavio Ferreira Gomes Cardim Library or dispersed throughout its facilities), which now encompasses copies of graphic arts and representative works of contemporary industrial "design." In 1999, the college opened the Professor Vincente Di Grado Gallery, an exhibition space dedicated to hosting contemporary art shows.

In early 2007, a group of teachers presented to the board of Fine Arts which already held the status of university center, the proposal to create a historical and artistic museum based on the library's collections. The project, prepared by professors Leila Rabello de Oliveira, was taken over by the board. The museum was inaugurated on September 23, 2007, as part of the 82nd anniversary celebrations of Fine Arts, with the aim ""organizing, conserving, exhibiting and diffusing the memory of the institution, as well as to document the development of the arts, communication, architecture and "design", having as its main axis the scientific and artistic production of its teachers, students and directors"." As a university museum, the institution was also conceived as a didactic experimentation laboratory, integrated into the academic daily life, and a cultural diffusion space, promoting educational activities aimed at the general public. The museum was officially registered on April 14, 2008.

Since its inauguration, the Fine Arts Museum of São Paulo has organized exhibitions of historical themes, aiming to give greater visibility to the trajectory of the university center. It also seeks to position itself as a diffusing center for reflections on contemporary cultural and artistic production. In the field of museology a dexpography, we highlight the creation of Gallery 13, an experimental space dedicated to the exercise of activities related to criticism, curatorship, and mounting of exhibitions. The gallery also houses the "Exhibitions Editais", exhibitions of works of students selected by a committee. In November 2010, the museum was closed for a renovation of its facilities. It was reopened on June 8, 2011, with an exhibition of 40 pieces from its collection.

Among the prominent exhibitions held in recent years by the museum, the highlights include "Art at the Academy: Historical Collection", in celebration of the 85th anniversary of the Fine Arts, with works by various artists linked to the school; "Brazil: Figuration x Abstraction - Late 1940s', dealing with the avant-garde experiments of the mid-twentieth century, in the transition from modernism to contemporary art, with works by, among others, Waldemar Cordeiro, Cicero Dias and Antônio Bandeira; 'Comics"51", featuring rare publications, documents and original works by artists who attended the First International Exposition of Comics, held in São Paulo in 1951; "Shut, Images of Transformations and Borders', with photographs of the British Peter Caton, documenting the economic transformations and social problems in the Cerrado; "Young Italian Video Art', selection of works by video art produced by students of the Center for Applies Arts and Multimedia Research of Rome, etc.

== Installations ==
The Fine Arts Museum of São Paulo occupies three distinct spaces on the Fine Arts campus in Vila Mariana. In the main unit, located at Rua Dr. Alvaro Alvim, is the "Collection Gallery", a large hall with 300 square meters of exhibition area, where works of the permanent collection are exhibited, in exhibitions of medium duration, in addition to the "Vicente Di Grado Gallery", dedicated to temporary exhibitions of art, architecture and social communication.

The "Design Gallery" Core Gallery is located in the homonymous core of the University Center. The space is dedicated to hosting short and medium-term exhibitions related to the area of design and its segments, such as Graphic Arts, product s, fashion and Interior Design.

In the Major Maragliano Street unit, the museum maintains the "Gallery 13", space directly linked to the visual arts course, dedicated to hosting exhibitions of artistic works performed by students or guest artists, as well as activities related to didactic exercises. in areas related to museology, such as editing, curating, critique, visual programming, and lighting.

== Activities ==
In the field of museological activity, the institution maintains a permanent agenda of activities aimed at cultural diffusion, focusing on curating or collaboration in the organization and organization of exhibitions, of medium and short duration, with works of its permanent collection or provided by other private collectors and institutions, covering topics such as visual arts, graphic arts, architecture, design, media, history institutional and related themes, as well as the development of actions of art education parallel to the exhibitions. It also maintains museological documentation activities, such as cataloging, digitization, identification and study of pieces of the collection, with the participation and performance of students from the university center as monitors.

In the field of scientific diffusion and production, the museum keeps students developing research related to its collection and the history of the institution, as well as related subjects, covering the arts, design, communication, and architecture. The main line of ongoing research at the museum is to produce an inventory of public works in the city of São Paulo (monuments, murals, sculptures, etc.) produced by connected artists. to the School and Academy of Fine Arts, such as Rafael Galvez, Clovis Graciano, Amedeo Zani, Alfredo Oliani, Julio Guerra and Vicente Larocca. The research, which includes the survey and documentation of the in crazy documents, also aims to carry out an analysis of the state of conservation, the conditions of implementation and the surrounding, the symbolic value and the referential function of such works from the point of view. local communities, as well as the identification of aesthetic characteristics and stylistic classification of the production of such artists. The preliminary results of the research were presented during the VII Museum Week of the University of São Paulo, in 2009.

== Collection ==
The collection of the Museum of Fine Arts of São Paulo is divided into two major nuclei: the artistic collection comprising works of art, objects of design and architectural projects, and the historical collection, composed mainly by document and photography. They are objects acquired through purchases and donations or produced in didactic activities, accumulated since the foundation of the Academy of Fine Arts in 1925 to the present day.

The artistic collection brings together approximately 700 works, including paintings, sculptures, drawing and engravings, dating mostly from the 20th century, encompassing the period that goes from the academicism to the contemporary art, mainly of active authors in São Paulo. Of this total, there is a particularly relevant set of 240 inventoried works, linked to the production of teachers, students, and graduates, from the foundation of the school to the present day, selected according to their importance within the historical context of the institution, for their relevance. historical, or for its aesthetic and artistic qualities.

Painters and sculptors linked to the academic tradition are represented, such as Oscar Pereira da Silva, Rafael Galvez, Paulo Vergueiro Lopes de León, Tulio Mugnaini, Alfredo Oliani, Vicente Larocca, José Wasth Rodrigues and Luís Morrone (most notably a bronze study of the Monument to Pedro Álvares Cabral, in Ibirapuera Park), artists of undefined style or known to synthesize, to a greater or lesser extent, academic characteristics with modern influences, such as Julio Guerra, [Colette Pujol, Lívia Guimarães Lopes and Ricardo Cipicchia, modern painters such as Cícero Dias and others linked to the Paulista Artistic Family (namely Clóvis Graciano) and contemporaries such as Flávio Imperio, Renina Katz, Takashi Fukushima, Waldemar Lamb and Antônio Bandeira.

The design core covers topics such as product, graphic and fashion, including objects, posters and design projects. Textile pieces. Noteworthy is a set of drawings by the Dener Pamplona de Abreu, an icon of Brazilian fashion from the 60s and 70s, as well as the Vicente Di Grado Collection, composed of over 300 books illustrated by the former student, teacher and director of the Fine Arts. In the architectural collection, the museum highlights the Eduardo Kneese de Mello Collection, composed of more than 8,000 objects, including Architectural drawings, mockups, photography, slides and documents bequeathed by the architect and former professor of the institution.

The historical collection is gathered at the Fine Arts Memory and Documentation Center (Cedoc), linked to the Luciano Octavio Ferreira Gomes Cardim Library, which aims to preserve and disseminate the textual and iconographic documentation of the Fine Arts University Center.

== See also ==
- Museum of Contemporary Art, University of São Paulo
- Lasar Segall Museum
