= Dodi Leal =

Brazilian performer and art curator

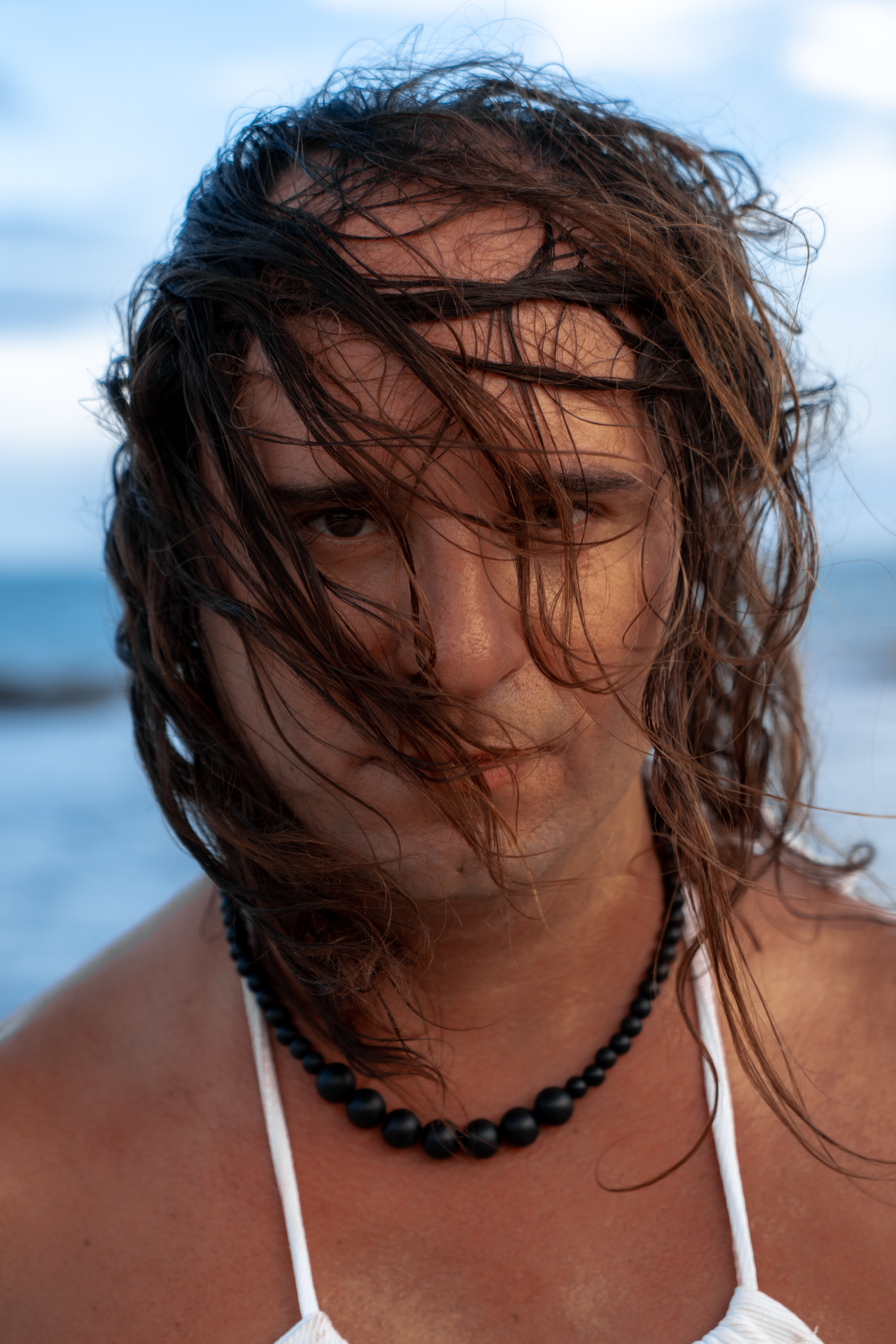
- Born: 1984 (age 41–42); São Paulo, Brazil
- Occupations: Performer, curator, trans activist and researcher

Dodi Tavares Borges Leal (born 1984) is an academic, performer and trans rights activist who, is a professor in performing arts at the Federal University of Southern Bahia (UFSB) and an associate researcher at the State University of Santa Catarina (UDESC). Her 2018 appointment at UFSB meant that she was the first transgender arts professor to take up a permanent employment in public higher education in the world.

As a performer and curator, Leal's work intersects with issues around trans identities. She also initiated the 'luzvesti' concept, incorporating lighting design for stage into gender studies for the first time. Along with Lúcia Romano, Marta Baião, Nina Caetano, Sarah Duarte, Stela Fischer and Yasmin Nogueira, she works in the field of performance and gender studies in Brazil.

In 2023, she was appointed as a visiting lecturer at the Escola de Comunicações e Artes (ESA) to teach on travesti storytelling and performance. The course was subject to transphobic attacks on social media, but was defended publicly by the University of São Paulo.

== Selected publications ==
- Leal, Dodi T. B. (2021). "Gender in Danger: Transdanger People in Performing Arts in Brazil". Theatre Research International. 46 (3): 398–406. doi:10.1017/S0307883321000341. ISSN 0307-8833.
- Leal, Dodi T. B.; Romano, Lúcia R. V. (2021). "Dossier – Fighting Back: Contemporary Theatre in Brazil: Introduction". Theatre Research International. 46 (3): 371–373. doi:10.1017/S0307883321000316. ISSN 0307-8833.
