= Isabel Vincent =

Canadian journalist

- Born: 1965 (age 60–61); Toronto, Ontario, Canada
- Education: University of Toronto
- Occupations: Investigative journalist, author
- Employers: New York Post; The Globe and Mail; National Post
- Writing career
- Language: English, French, Portuguese, Spanish
- Years active: 1988–present (The Varsity), 1990s–present (professional)
- Genre: Non-fiction
- Subjects: International conflicts, drug wars, corruption, true crime, historical non-fiction
- Notable works: See No Evil, Two Against Hitler: The True Story of Two Courageous Sisters, a Rescue Mission in the Third Reich, and Opera
- Notable awards: Canadian Association of Journalists' Award for excellence in investigative journalism Southam Fellowship

Isabel Vincent (born 1965) is a Canadian investigative journalist who writes for the New York Post, is an alumna of the University of Toronto's The Varsity newspaper and the author of five books.

== Early life and education ==
Born in 1965 to a Portuguese Catholic family and reared in Toronto, Vincent speaks English, French, Portuguese, and Spanish. At the University of Toronto, she majored in English, wrote for the student newspaper The Gargoyle for two years, and edited The Varsity from 1988 to 1989. In 1990 she earned her B.A. there at University College, Toronto.

== Career ==
In the 1990s, she became a Latin American correspondent covering the drug wars of the Medellín Cartel. From 1991 to 1995, she was in Rio de Janeiro for Toronto's The Globe and Mail. Serving as a foreign correspondent, she covered conflicts in Kosovo for the Globe and Mail, and the war in Angola for the National Post and the Globe and Mail. Since 2008, she has been an investigative reporter for the New York Post, covering New York City and corruption.

=== Lamont/Spencer criticism ===
During the 1990s, Vincent wrote several articles and the book See No Evil about the Abílio dos Santos Diniz kidnapping case in Brazil. Two young Canadians, David Spencer and Christine Lamont, had been convicted of Diniz's 1989 political kidnapping and confinement and sentenced to 28 years each in Brazilian prisons. Vincent's writing was highly critical of Canadian media and their assumption that Lamont and Spencer must be innocent, attributing those assumptions to prejudices about Brazil. These writings brought Vincent open hostility from the Canadian journalism establishment.

However, Edmonton Journal columnist Roger Levesque said, "She's critical of magazines like Saturday Night and CBC television's Fifth Estate, which ran stories on the case seemingly without consulting the trial transcripts available in English translations." Writing for the Financial Post, University of Toronto anthropologist Robert W. Shirley wrote, "...the families, lobbyists, several Canadian politicians and much of the Canadian press were unwilling to study the complexities of the case and deliberately created an international incident". He said that Vincent made an "attempt to understand how two idealistic young Canadians would have become involved in such a case. Vincent presents a wider and darker picture... Her writing is at times rushed and impacted, difficult to follow as she shifts rapidly in time and space. But her summing up of the case is masterful and she addresses some fundamental philosophical questions."

David Frum wrote,

Vincent mercilessly rips to pieces the lies surrounding the Lamont-Spencer affair, and uncompromisingly takes to task the gullible journalists who allowed themselves to be manipulated by a pair of wannabe revolutionary terrorists... See No Evil is a searing account of journalistic malpractice, one that belongs on the bookshelf of every journalist, and every serious consumer of news, in Canada. And Vincent's ominous conclusion should be framed: "If there's a moral here, it lies in the ease with which public opinion in this country can be influenced and directed, especially by using distortions and lies."

In 1996, Lamont and Spencer admitted they had participated in the kidnappings.

For her work on the Lamont/Spencer case, Vincent received the Canadian Association of Journalists' Award for excellence in investigative journalism and a Southam Fellowship.

=== Kielburger libel suit ===
In 1996, Vincent wrote a feature on Craig Kielburger in Saturday Night magazine saying the teenage anti-child labor advocate diverted donations made to his Free the Children charity to his family. Kielburger sued Vincent and the magazine for libel and, in February, 2000, settled for $C 319,000. The National Post editor-in-chief said settling was "largely a commercial decision... It was costing us a great deal of time and money. It was time to wind things up."

=== Cook sisters book ===
In 2021, Vincent published Two Against Hitler: The True Story of Two Courageous Sisters, a Rescue Mission in the Third Reich, and Opera, about the sisters Louise Cook and Ida Cook, the latter better known as romance writer Mary Burchell, who helped Jews escape Nazi Germany, with the possible covert assistance of the British government.

== Books ==
1. See No Evil: the Strange Case of Christine Lamont and David Spencer Reed Books Canada, 1996. ISBN 0-433-39619-9
2. Hitler's Silent Partners: Swiss Banks, Nazi Gold, and the Pursuit of Justice Toronto : A.A. Knopf Canada, 1997. ISBN 0-676-97093-1. Vintage Canada, 1998. ISBN 0-676-97141-5.
  - German translation: Gold der verfolgten Juden: wie es in den Schweizer Tresoren verschwand und zur Beute der Banken und Alliierten wurde; translated by Klaus Fritz, Norbert Juraschitz and Thomas Pfeiffer. Munich: Diana Verlag, c1997, ISBN 3-8284-5003-2
  - French translation: La Suisse, les avoirs juifs et le secret bancaire; translated by André Dommergues and François Tétreau. Paris: L'Archipel, 1997. ISBN 2-84187-079-0
3. Bodies and Souls: The Trafficking of Jewish Immigrant Prostitutes in the Americas. Random House Canada, 2006. ISBN 0-679-31162-9, ISBN 0-679-31163-7. Details the gang Zwi Migdal in forcing women to become prostitutes.
4. Gilded Lily: Lily Safra, The Making of One of the World's Wealthiest Women. Harper, 2010. ISBN 978-0-06-113393-0
5. Dinner with Edward: The Story of an Unexpected Friendship (2016), ISBN 1616206942. A memoir about her deep friendship with an elderly gourmand, who gives her insights into life while sharing his exquisite dinners. The movie version of this book is planned to star David Suchet, best known for his role as Hercule Poirot.
6. RFK Jr.: The Fall and Rise New York: William Morrow, 2026. ISBN 0-063-47228-7.

== Awards ==
Vincent has received multiple awards:

- Canadian Association of Journalists Award for Excellence in Investigative Journalism
- Journalism fellow at Massey College, University of Toronto.
- National Jewish Book Award in Canada, for Bodies and Souls
- Yad Vashem Award for Holocaust History, for Hitler's Silent Partners.
