= Casas Bahia =

Brazilian retail chain

- Formerly: Casas Bahia Comercial Ltda. (1952-2011)
- Type: Subsidiary
- Industry: Retail
- Genre: Department stores
- Founded: 1952; 74 years ago
- Founder: Samuel Klein
- Headquarters: São Caetano do Sul, Brazil
- Number of locations: 559
- Area served: Brazil
- Key people: Michael Klein (CEO)
- Products: Clothing, footwear, bedding, furniture, jewellery, beauty products, electronics, toys, tools, sports equipment, appliances, housewares
- Revenue: ▲ R$ 17.228 billion (2015)
- Number of employees: 57,500 (2014)
- Parent: Grupo Casas Bahia
- Website: www.casasbahia.com.br

Casas Bahia (English: Bahia Houses) is a Brazilian retail chain specializing in furniture and home appliances. Currently, it is one of the largest retail chain in Brazil, the other being Magazine Luiza and Americanas. It was founded in 1952 in São Caetano do Sul, São Paulo, by Polish immigrant Samuel Klein, who began his career as a peddler selling products to migrant workers from the Brazilian Northeast. Since June 2019, the Klein family own a controlling stake in Via Varejo, which owns the store.

== Operations ==
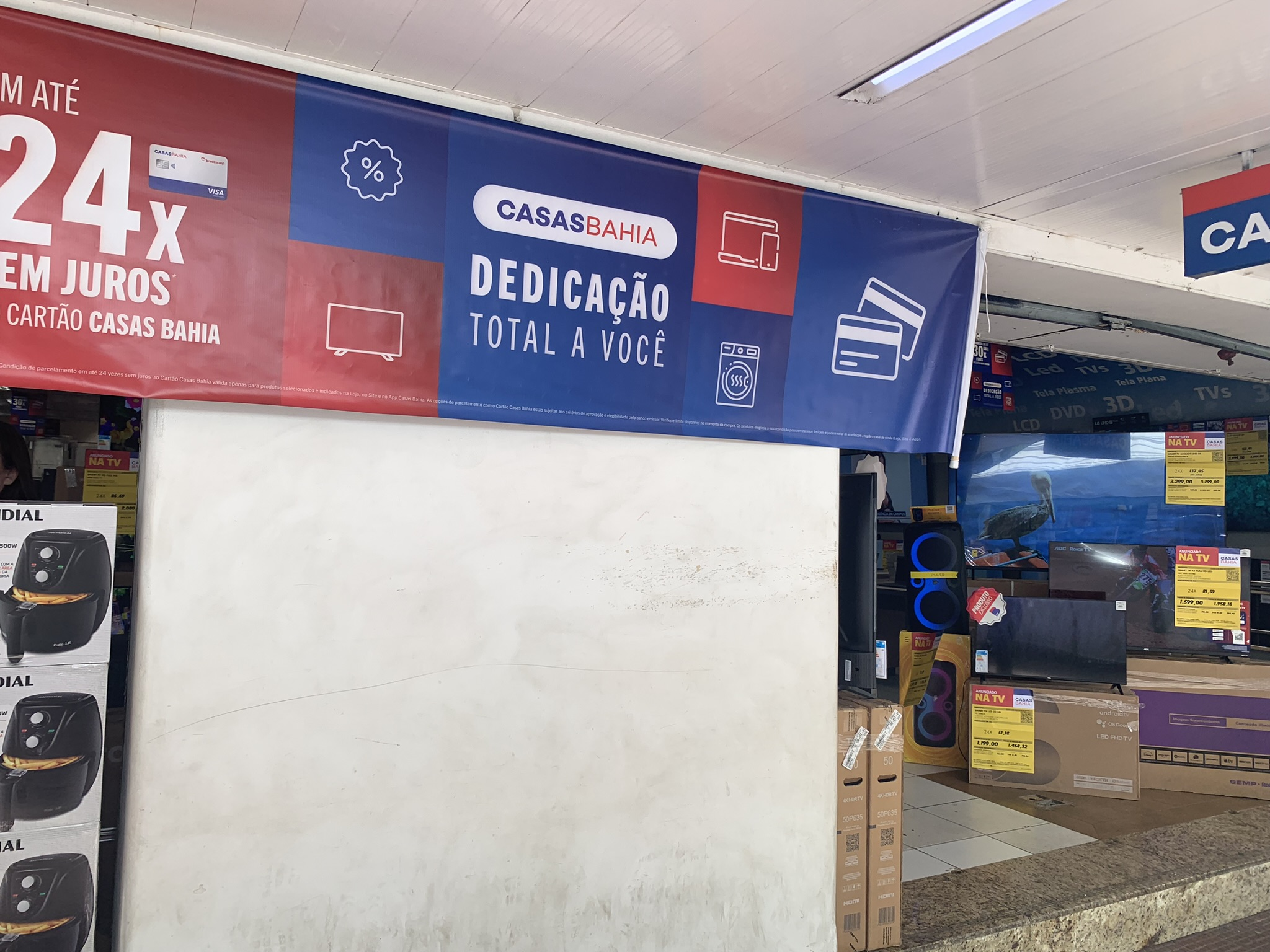
Casas Bahia in Nova Friburgo

Casas Bahia, unlike many of its competitors, does not rely on an internet presence as a cornerstone of its strategy—only in February 2009 it launched its online store, pressed by an increasing number of online sales in Brazil.

Rather, Casas Bahia makes the majority of its profit by charging interest on installment plan purchases, making it possible for low-income customers to purchase products which they would not be able to pay off in a single payment.

Another sales technique of the store is to locate cashiers in the back of the store, which requires clients to pass by all the products on the floor each month in order to pay their next monthly payment. Salespeople also consider the lines at the cashiers appropriate potential sales targets (which they refer to as bocas de caixa "open cashiers").

As of 2004, the company employed 22,000 people and was generating $2 billion in profits. By 2010, it had more than 500 stores in eleven states (São Paulo, Rio de Janeiro, Minas Gerais, Espírito Santo, Paraná, Santa Catarina, Goiás, Mato Grosso, Mato Grosso do Sul and even Bahia), besides the Federal District.

As of July 2020, the company has 857 stores in Brazil. The state with the largest number of Casas Bahia stores is São Paulo, with 358 stores.

In August 2026, Casas Bahia filed for bankruptcy after reporting further losses in Q2 2026, reportedly losing 10.1 billion reais ($1.92 billion USD) in 2026. As a result, the company immediately closed 298 stores while it tries to secure a way to restructure its debt.

== Marketing ==
The company's mascot is "Baianinho" (Little Bahian), a toothy boy wearing a cangaceiro hat, which has been present since 1979. In 2020, the character was redesigned as a modern dark-skinned teenager named "CB", with the company publicizing this change through a commercial where the character's appearance changed. The change, however, caused controversy with the public, who felt it completely "whitewashed" the character, and removed his essence. The official YouTube upload of the commercial quickly surpassed 70,000 dislikes.

In May 2026, the character reverted to his original design and name. However, this also generated controversy, as the new character was generated using AI.
