= Frida Alexandr =

Brazilian Jewish homemaker and author

- Born: Frida Schweidson; 29 December 1906; Rio Grande do Sul, Brazil
- Died: June 1972 (aged 65); São Paulo, Brazil
- Occupation: Homemaker
- Spouse: Boris Alexandr
- Children: 3
- Writing career
- Language: Portuguese
- Genre: Memoir
- Subjects: Russian-Jewish emigrants to Rio Grande do Sul, Brazil, early 20th century
- Notable works: Filipson, Memórias da primeira colônia judaica no Rio Grande do Sul (1967)

Frida Alexandr (29 December 1906 – June 1972) was a Brazilian Jewish homemaker, volunteer, and author. Her only published work, Filipson, Memórias da primeira colônia judaica no Rio Grande do Sul (Filipson: Memories of the First Jewish Colony in Rio Grande do Sul) (1967) describes the Jewish immigrant farming colony established in the Brazilian countryside of Rio Grande do Sul in the early 20th century. She was the first woman to publish stories about Jewish immigrants living in Brazil's farmlands, and the only woman from Filipson to write about the colony from a first-hand perspective.

== Biography ==
Frida Schweidson was the daughter of Russian Jewish immigrants who had come to Brazil with the support of the Jewish Colonization Association. She was born and raised on her parents' farm, which was named Filipson, and was educated in the school run by the colonists.

In her late teens she married Boris Alexandr, a Russian immigrant, and moved to São Paulo, where he played piano in silent-movie theatres. They had two sons and a daughter. In São Paulo she became an active volunteer for the Women's International Zionist Organization (WIZO). She wrote her only book, Filipson, as a WIZO project. She began writing the book at the request of her children, who had heard her stories of growing up when they were younger. She began writing the memoir 20 years after she had left Filipson, and completed it 20 years later. A few copies of the first edition were sold, but most were donated for charity. No subsequent editions were published.

== Filipson ==
. . . our modest creek. It rolled year after year, fulfilling its destiny, quenching our thirst, cleansing the newly born, washing our wounds, sweat and tears of frustration, and changing itself into the golden and aromatic broth at the table of the newlyweds.

— Filipson, page 200

Filipson, Memórias da primeira colônia judaica no Rio Grande do Sul (Filipson: Memories of the First Jewish Colony in Rio Grande do Sul) is a compilation of 56 narratives describing the Jewish agricultural colony between the years 1905 and 1925 through the eyes of Alexandr and others who experienced these events. It is noted as the only first-hand description of Jewish life in Filipson told by a woman who lived there, and the first book published in Portuguese that exclusively dealt with Jewish immigrants to Brazil's farming areas. Alexandr drew on her memories of her own childhood and teen years in Filipson, as well as memories of her brothers and other residents, to write the narratives. Written in Portuguese, the book is peppered with regional colloquialisms.

The narratives detail the lives and activities of Jewish "peasants, cattle handlers, milk collectors, pharmacists, healers, midwives and schoolteachers, as well as others involved in the plowing, planting and harvesting in the fields". Attention is paid to the religious practices and life cycle ceremonies of the residents, their construction of a synagogue, and children's education. Outside events that impacted on the colony, including "epidemics, natural calamities and outlaws", are also discussed. Alexandr gives voice to the desire of many young female residents to leave the "suffocating confines" of the farming community, a desire that would only be fulfilled through marriage.

Hussar and Igel note that Alexandr writes more like a novelist than a historian, liberally employing narrative techniques such as "unity of setting and recurring characters, archetypes, themes and symbols". The fact that she did not specify dates for the historical record also indicates that she did not intend to write a history per se.

== Sources ==
- Falbel, Nachman (1984). Estudos sobre a comunidade judaica no Brasil [Studies on the Jewish Community in Brazil] (in Portuguese). Federação Israelita do Estado de São Paulo.
- Hussar, James A. (2008). Cycling Through the Pampas: Fictionalized Accounts of Jewish Agricultural Colonization in Argentina and Brazil. ISBN 978-0549590613.
- Igel, Regina (1999), "Brazilian Jewish Women Writers at the Crossroads", in Agosín, Marjorie (ed.), Passion, Memory, and Identity, UNM Press, ISBN 082632049X
- Igel, Regina (2000). "Escritores Judeus Brasileiros: Um Percurso Em Andamento" [Brazilian Jewish Writers: A Runway in Progress]. Revista Iberoamericana (in Portuguese). LXVI (191).
