= Extra (retail chain) =

Brazilian hypermarket and supermarket store chain

Extra Hipermercados is a major Brazilian hypermarket and supermarket chain, owned by Grupo Pão de Açúcar.

Extra Hipermercados, commonly referred to as just Extra, is a Brazilian hypermarket and supermarket chains owned by grupo Pão de Açúcar.

As of December 2005, Extra has 76 stores. Some of these stores came from the acquisitions of Paes Mendonça (smaller stores were converted to Pão de Açúcar and CompreBem) and Sendas (Sendas' Bon Marché hypermarkets were rebranded to Extra Bon Marché) by the group.

On 23 May 2019, Rallye S.A., owner of Groupe Casino, which owned a majority stake in GPA, current parent of Extra, declared bankruptcy protection in an effort to maintain its high debt costs. Casino later announced that same day that the bankruptcy would not affect any of their subsidiaries and that operations would continue normally.

In 2024, Casino USA filed for Chapter 15 bankruptcy.

== Extra Eletro ==
Grupo Pão de Açúcar also operates electronics and appliance stores under the Extra Eletro banner. These stores are mostly located in major commerce streets and shopping malls. This banner was known as Jumbo Eletro (after the purchase of Eletroradiobraz in the 1980s) and later Eletro.

== Minimercado Extra ==
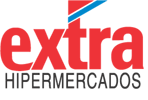
old logo

Grupo Pão de Açúcar launched in 2007 two new store formats, both carrying the Extra brand. Extra Perto supermarkets, directed to an audience of the same demographic as Extra hypermarkets, and Minimercado Extraconvenience stores, aimed to compete with "neighborhood markets".

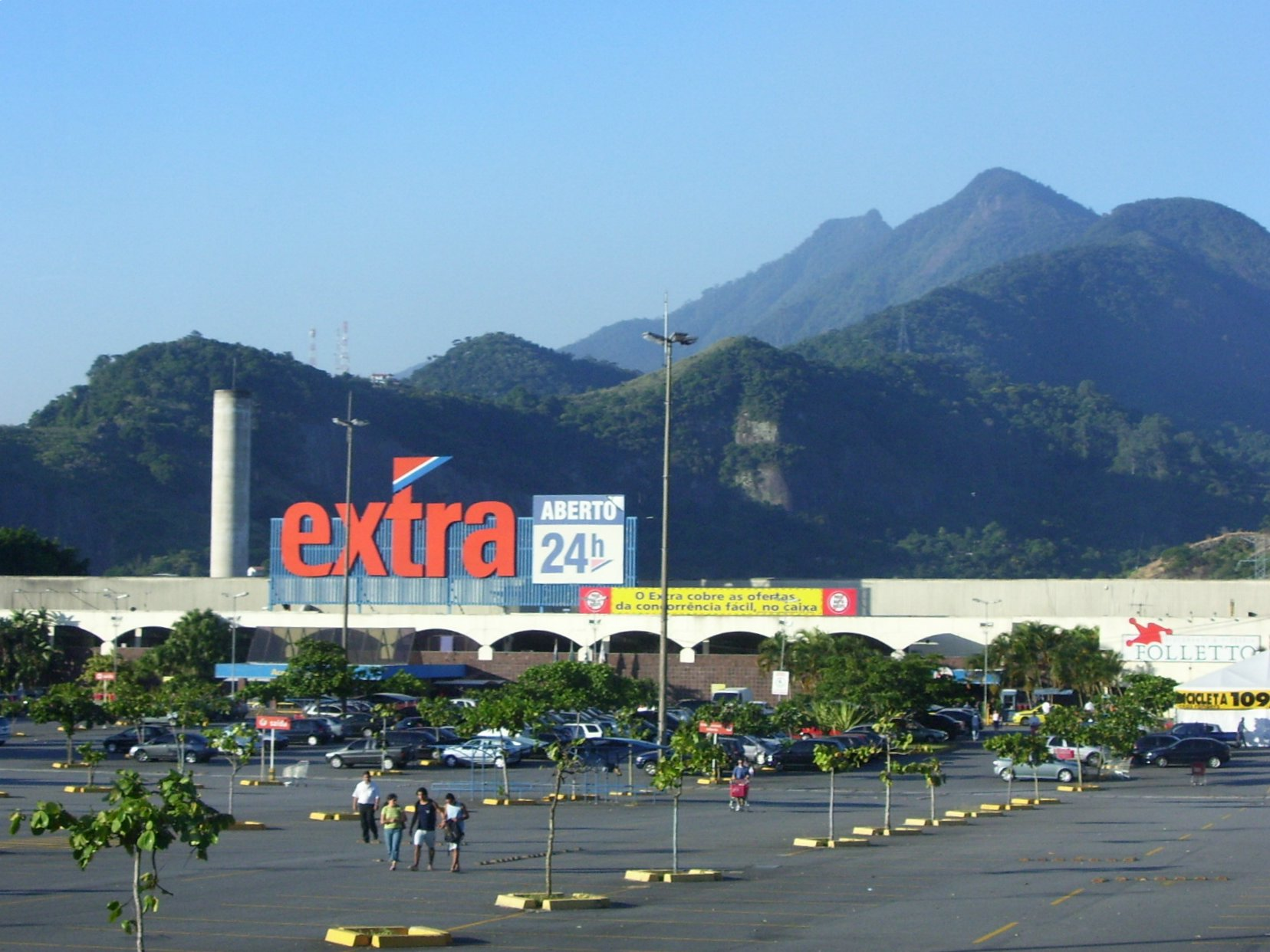
An Extra hypermarket.
