= Compre Bem =

Brazilian supermarket chain

CompreBem was a supermarket chain in São Paulo and Rio de Janeiro states, in Brazil, owned by Grupo Pão de Açúcar.

This banner's origins start by the Pão de Açúcar acquisition of the Comprebem (with a lowercase "B") supermarket chain in northeastern Brazil, which was rebranded as Pão de Açúcar Comprebem, and eventually absorbed into Pão de Açúcar.

In the early 2000s, the group acquired São Paulo-based Barateiro Supermercados, which was to become the present CompreBem a few years later. Initially, the CompreBem Barateiro brand was launched, in advertising and own-brand products. Then, after the takeover of Sé Supermercados by CBD, some Sé stores were rebranded as CompreBem (without the "Barateiro" name), with the remainder rebranded as Pão de Açúcar. By 2003, the Barateiro brand was phased out, with all Barateiro stores rebranded as CompreBem.

Grupo Pão de Açúcar briefly used the Barateiro brand in Rio de Janeiro State, by the acquisition of ABC Supermercados, and subsequent rebranding as ABC Barateiro. These stores are now branded as ABC CompreBem, but this branding will be phased out in the near future.

In 2016, GPA decided to rescue the CompreBem brand in the relationship program called "Aliado CompreBem," inspired by a model originally implemented by Grupo Éxito, a subsidiary of Grupo Casino (GPA's parent company) in Colombia. In it, small independent supermarkets make purchases to supply their stores with the same stocks available under GPA's banners at reduced prices. In exchange, the company offers to paint the storefront with the brand "Aliado CompreBem" as long as the aliado maintains regular purchases with the company.
