= Valêncio Xavier =

- Born: 21 March 1933; São Paulo, São Paulo, Brazil
- Died: 5 December 2008 (aged 75); Curitiba, Paraná, Brazil
- Occupations: Film and television director; screenwriter; writer

Valêncio Xavier Niculitcheff (21 March 1933 – 5 December 2008) was a Brazilian writer, screenwriter, film and television director. He was known by his experimental writing, mixing verbal and visual languages; among them O mez da grippe, a novella set in Curitiba during the 1918 influenza outbreak.

== Life and career ==
Born in São Paulo, Valêncio moved to Curitiba at the age of 21. There he worked at TV Paranaense (now RPC TV) and at Rede Tupi's affiliate, TV Paraná (now CNT). In this medium, he wrote dramas and even directed episodes of Globo Repórter.

Behind the cameras, he served as director, assistant director, editor, screenwriter and consultant. He directed films such as: "O Pão Negro – An Episode of Colônia Cecília" from 1993 and "Os 11 de Curitiba, Todos Nós", among others. He received the award for "Best Fiction Film" at the IX Brazilian Short Film Journey, for "Caro Signore Feline" in 1980.

Together with Francisco Alves dos Santos, he created, in 1975, the Cinemateca de Curitiba, linked to the Cultural Foundation. He also served as director in museums and cultural spaces in the capital.

Valêncio Xavier wrote short stories in newspapers and magazines, such as: Nicolau, Revista USP and Folha de S. Paulo cultural section Mais!. He was a columnist for the newspaper Gazeta do Povo from 1995 to 2003.

== Works ==
- 7 de Amor e Violência (anthology) – 1964;
- Desembrulhando as Balas Zequinha – 1973
- Curitiba, de Nós (with Poty Lazzarotto) – 1975;
- O Mez da Grippe – 1981;
- Maciste no Inferno – 1983;
- O Minotauro – 1985;
- O Mistério da Prostituta Japonesa & Mimi-Nashi-Oichi – 1986;
- A Propósito de Figurinhas (with Poty Lazzarotto) – 1986;
- Poty, Trilhas e Traços (a biography of Poty Lazzarotto) – 1994;
- Meu 7º dia – 1998;
- Minha Mãe Morrendo e o Menino Mentido – 2001
- Crimes à Moda Antiga – 2004, entre outros.
