= GPA (company) =

Brazilian retail company

Companhia Brasileira de Distribuição
- Trade name: GPA
- Formerly: Grupo Pão de Açúcar
- Type: Public
- Traded as: B3: PCAR3, PCAR4; Ibovespa Component
- Industry: Retail
- Founded: 7 September 1948; 78 years ago
- Founder: Valentim Diniz
- Headquarters: São Paulo, SP, Brazil
- Number of locations: 1,429 stores (2021)
- Key people: Jean-Charles Naouri (chairman); Marcelo Pimentel (CEO)
- Brands: Assaí; Extra; Pão de Açúcar
- Revenue: ▲US$9.19 billion (2021)
- Net income: ▼US$172 million (2021)
- Total assets: ▼US$8.86 billion (2021)
- Owner: Free Float (71.8%)
- Number of employees: 84,464 (2021): GPA Brasil: 50,968
- Subsidiaries: GPA Malls; Multivarejo
- Website: gpabr.com

Companhia Brasileira de Distribuição, or GPA (from its former name Grupo Pão de Açúcar), is the largest Brazilian company engaged in the retailing of food, general merchandise, electronic goods, home appliances and other products from its supermarkets, hypermarkets and home appliance stores. Its headquarters are in São Paulo city, and it is owned by Free Float.

The company is the second biggest retail company in Latin America by revenue and the second largest online retailer in Brazil. The company operates its e-commerce through Cnova, a subsidiary of Via Varejo.

== History ==
In 1948, the Portuguese immigrant Valentim dos Santos Diniz opened a confectionery in São Paulo, which he named Pão de Açúcar ("Sugarloaf Mountain") in memory of the first landscape he saw of Brazil when he arrived by boat (Sugarloaf Mountain is a rocky peak that dominates Rio de Janeiro's natural skyline).

The company planned to open more than 150 stores by 2013, targeting northeast and mid-west regions.

In September 2013, Abílio Diniz, the son of the company's founder, stepped down as chairman of the company.

In 2024, Casino reduced its stake to 22.5%.

== Business units ==
GPA operates through different store concepts (and different banner logos):

809 retail stores; 68 drugstores* and 74 gas station.

- Pão de Açúcar (181 stores)
  - Minuto Pão de Açúcar (98 stores)
  - Pão de Açúcar Fresh (1)
  - Pão de Açúcar Adega
  - Posto Pão de Açúcar**
- Extra (72 stores; being converted into Assaí wholesaling stores)
  - Mercado Extra (146 stores)
  - Mini Extra (141 stores)
  - Drogaria Extra*
  - Posto Extra**
- Compre Bem (28 stores)
  - Posto Compre Bem**
- Assaí Atacadista
  - Posto Assaí

== Ownership structure ==
Currently, GPA is owned by:

- Free Float: 71,8%
- Grupo Casino: 22,5%
- Diretores e Conselheiros: 5,6%

== See also ==
- Brazilian Development Bank
