= Minhocão =

Minhocão may mean:

- Minhocão (legendary creature) - an earthworm or fish-like creature of Brazilian folklore
- Minhocão (São Paulo) - officially the Elevado Presidente Costa e Silva, a road
