= Avenida São João =

Key traffic artery and pedestrian street in São Paulo, Brazil

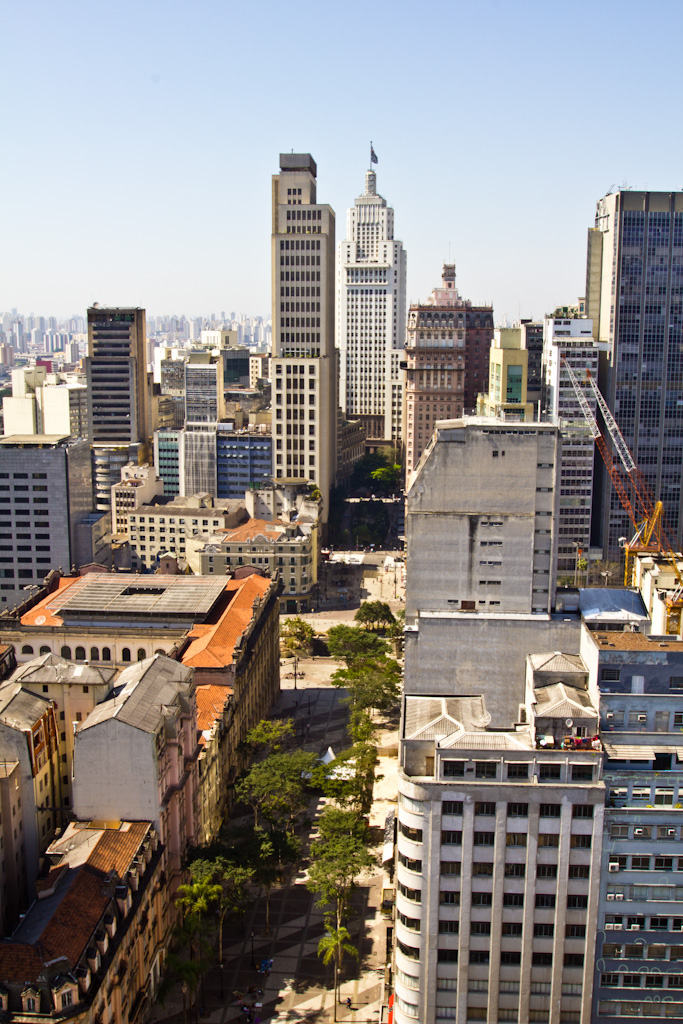
- Avenida São João
- Length: 1,930 m (6,330 ft)
- Location: São Paulo, Brazil
- Quarter: Sé (district of São Paulo), República, Santa Cecília
- From: São Bento Street
- To: Marechal Deodoro Square

Avenida São João (Portuguese for São João Avenue) is an important arterial road in the Central Zone of São Paulo. It is connected to the Minhocão and in front of it is the Altino Arantes Building (Banespa), an important urban focal point. In its main area, the avenue is completely pedestrianized, functioning as a promenade, with restricted access for cars.

== History ==
The history of Avenida São João dates back to 1651. In that year, Henrique da Cunha Gago and Cristóvão da Cunha, residents of São Paulo, requested from the Municipal Chamber the donation of lands in the area delimited by the Anhangabaú River and Yacuba streams through a letter stating: "The undersigned request Your Honors to grant each of them thirty brazos of land in the outskirts of this village, between two streams called Anhangobay and Yacuba. The measurement will start from the path that goes to Piratininga, in front of João Pires' land and next to some houses of Maria Morena, up to another thirty brazos of land towards the Yacuba stream". Thus, a dirt trail was born that connected these properties to the historic hill of São Paulo.

Over the course of its history, the rustic trail gradually acquired the name "Ladeira do Acú," derived from Yacuba, the adjacent creek. Its descent commenced from the former Largo do Rosário, presently known as Antonio Prado Square, and terminated close to Largo do Paiçandu. Beyond this point, it evolved into the "Estrada de Jundia," a vital route frequented by cattle drivers journeying into the State's hinterland.

Throughout the 18th century, it remained known as Ladeira do Acú. The current designation is a tribute to John the Baptist, considered the "protector of waters" in the Catholic tradition. This name designation stems from watercourses that crossed the old "Ladeira," which were considered dangerous by the early inhabitants of São Paulo. Yacuba or Acú means "poisoned water" in Tupi, and this creek ran alongside the present-day Post Office (Correios) building, flowing into the Anhangabaú, which also means "haunted waters" or "waters of the Devil" in Tupi.

This name initially gained informal recognition and was officially recorded starting on November 28, 1865, when councilman Malaquias Rogério de Salles Guerra suggested the name "Ladeira de São João." Later, the thoroughfare was transformed into a street and, from 1916 onwards, into Avenida São João. Between 1910 and 1937, successive renovations, widenings, and extensions were conducted.

Some of the widenings occurred during the administrations of Raimundo Duprat (1911–1913) from Libero Badaró Street to Largo de Paiçandu, Washington Luís (1914–1919) from Largo do Paissandu to Júlio de Mesquita Square, and Firmiano Pinto (1920–1925) from Libero Badaró Street to Pyrenees Square (now Marechal Deodoro Square).

In the early 1970s, a section of Avenida São João was elevated to create the Minhocão highway. Initiated by Mayor Paulo Maluf, the project aimed to alleviate traffic congestion in the city center and was inaugurated on the 417th anniversary of São Paulo. The heavy and continuous flow of cars, along with increased noise, dirt, and pollution, significantly impacted the areas where the viaduct was constructed, leading to a decline in real estate values in the region.

In the year 2024, during Mayor Ricardo Nunes' administration, a pilot program was launched to include the avenue in the 'Open Streets' program to pedestrianize major roads in São Paulo, closing them to automobile traffic and allowing pedestrians to freely walk through the city's streets. After the conclusion of the pilot, the city government announced that new dates and the continuation of the program on the avenue will be evaluated, with public hearings to be held for merchants and residents to present feedback.

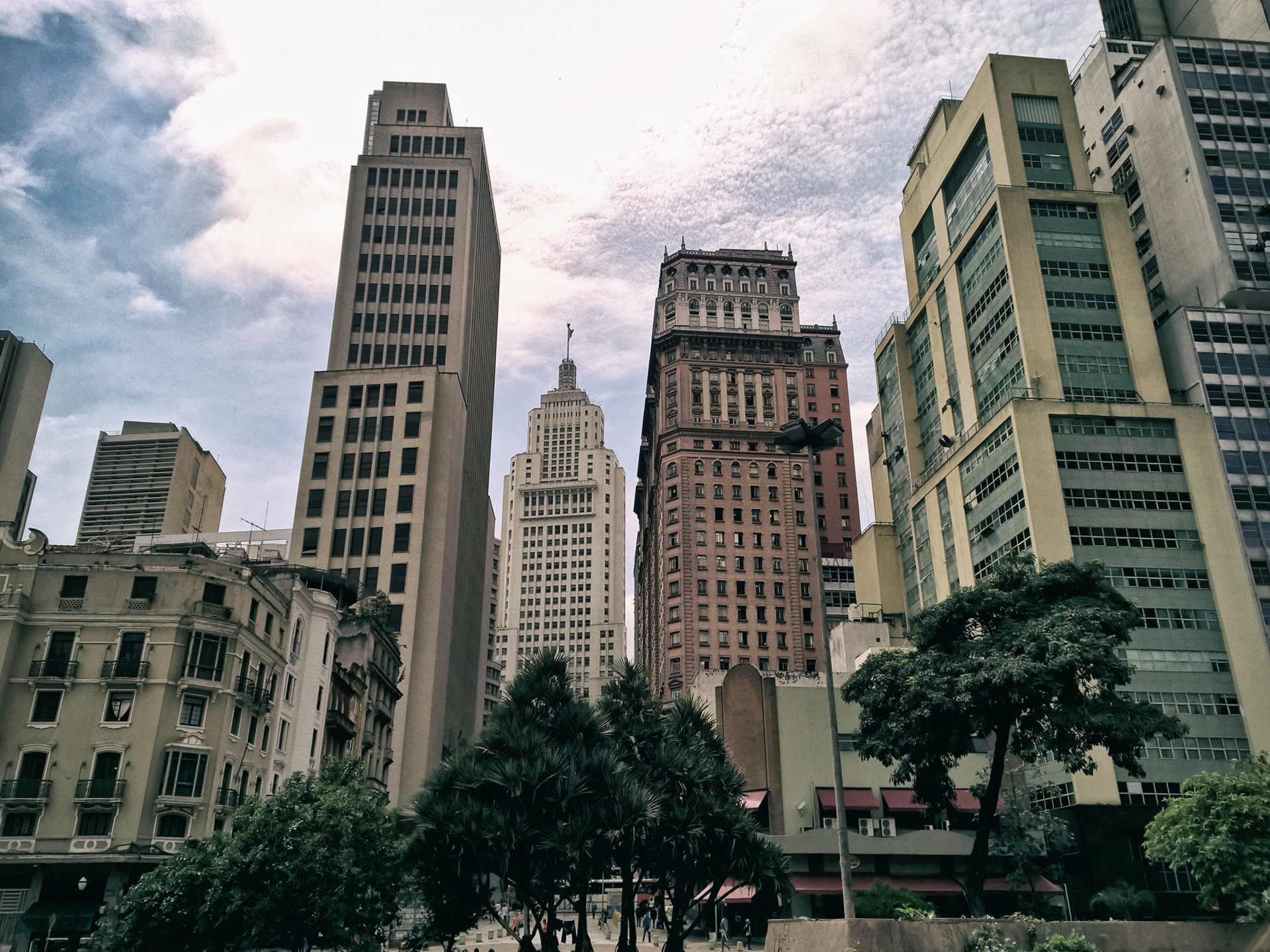
Avenida Sao João, one of the most famous in the city, viewed from the Vale do Anhangabaú in São Paulo.

=== Relevant crossings ===
- São Bento Street
- Líbero Badaró Street
- Avenida Prestes Maia
- Vale do Anhangabaú
- Largo do Paiçandu
- Avenida Ipiranga

=== Relevant buildings ===
- Altino Arantes Building
- Martinelli Building
- Post Office Palace
- Praça das Artes
- Andraus Building
- Olido Building and Gallery
- Galeria do Rock
- Bar Brahma

== Cultural References ==
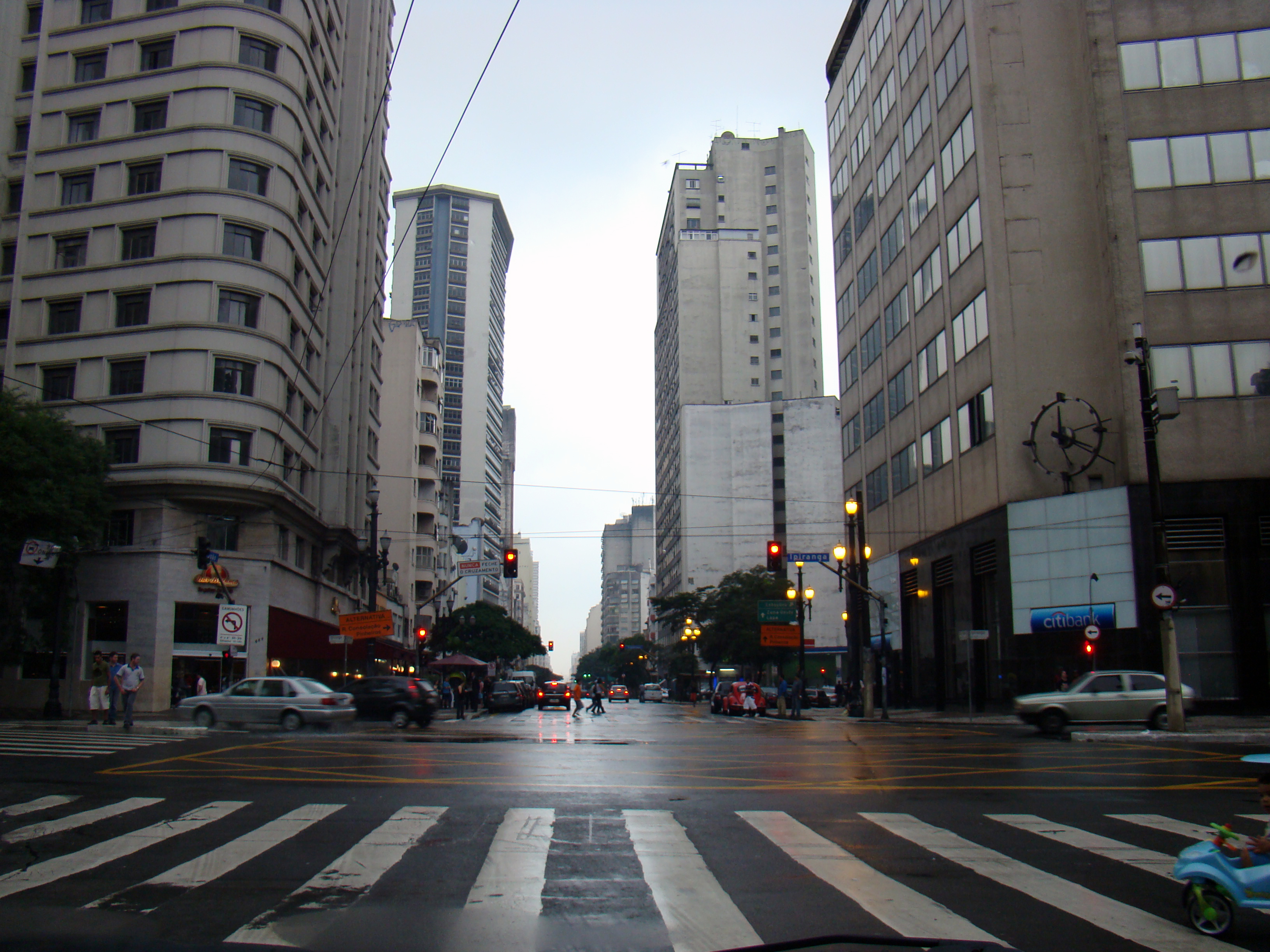
Intersection of Avenida São João with Avenida Ipiranga, immortalized in the song "Sampa" by Caetano Veloso.

In December 2022, renovations were carried out at the intersection of Avenida Ipiranga and São João, which included the construction of statues in honor of the representatives of São Paulo samba, Adoniran Barbosa and Paulo Vanzolini.

The song "Ronda" is considered famous in Brazilian music due to its portrayal of Avenida São João. Composed by Vanzolini, the song depicts the essence of São Paulo's urban landscape in the mid-20th century, capturing the bustling atmosphere and pulse of daily life along Avenida São João. The song's nostalgic lyrics and melody catapulted it into an emblem of Brazilian musical heritage, serving as a reference to São Paul's history, with the street serving as a backdrop.

Avenida São João features prominently in Bahian singer Caetano Veloso's song "Sampa". Released in 1978, the song reflects Veloso's experience and impressions of São Paulo, described through lyrical imagery.

== Bibliography ==
- GAMA, Lúcia Helena. Eram a consolação: sociabilidade e cultura em São Paulo nos anos 1960 e 1970; São Paulo: Edições SESC, 2023.
- TOLEDO, Benedito Lima de; São Paulo: três cidades em um século; São Paulo: Cosac e Naify, 2004.
