= Cauby Peixoto =

Brazilian singer

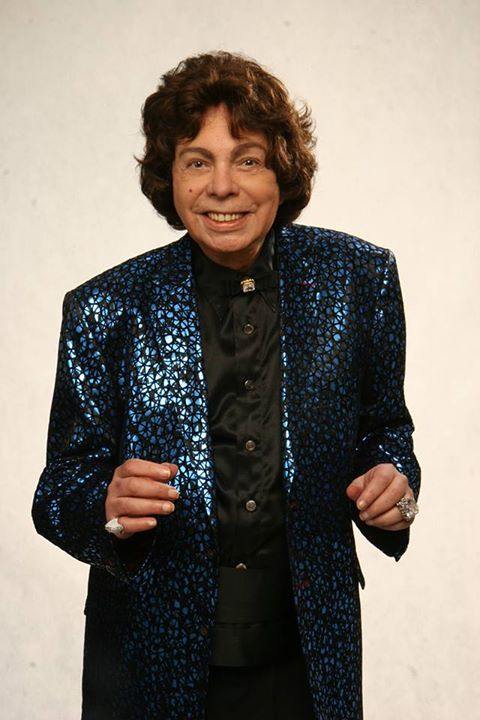
- Born: Cauby Peixoto; 10 February 1931; Niterói, Rio de Janeiro, Brazil
- Died: 15 May 2016 (aged 85); São Paulo, São Paulo, Brazil
- Other names: Ron Coby; Coby Dijon
- Occupations: Singer, composer
- Years active: 1947–2016

Cauby Peixoto (10 February 1931 – 15 May 2016) was a Brazilian singer, whose career lasted from the late 1940s until his death in 2016. He is known for his deep voice and extravagant mannerisms and hairstyles. He had a brief career in the United States in the 1950s, where he presented under the pseudonyms Ron Coby or Coby Dijon.

== Biography ==
Cauby Peixoto was born in Niterói into a family of musicians. His father, known as Cadete, played the guitar, his mother mandolin, his brothers played trumpet and piano and his sister was a singer. Cauby's uncle, Romualdo Peixoto, introduced the piano into samba recordings. He went to a Salesian school in Niteroi, where he sang in the church choir. Cauby started singing at talent shows on the radio.

Cauby recorded "Saia Branca", his first album, in 1951, but it went unnoticed. In 1952, Cauby went to São Paulo, where he met Di' Veras, a talent manager who would change his life. He was known for his great marketing strategies. Di' Veras asked to get your dental arcade Cauby and deploy a new arcade, was already a step, because during the visual change of Cauby, he did not fail to burn discs. Another step for Cauby was the transformation in the sense of dress, by being humble, dressed an unusual mode for an artist of the time. In 1955, Cauby released his first success in Brazil, a Portuguese version of Blue Gardenia, at the time, success in the voice of Nat King Cole, the greatest Idol of Cauby, and theme song of the film The Blue Gardenia. Di' Veras managed Cauby until 1958, when Cauby reached the 5th place among the most played albums in the USA.

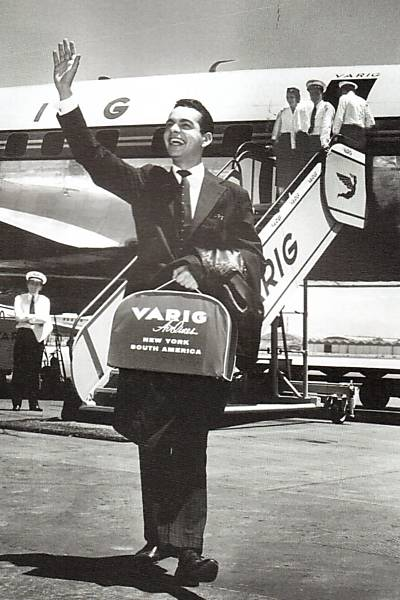
Ron Coby landing by Varig, on 2 August 1955, was the maiden voyage of the Super Constellation of Varig which reduced 72 hours flight from Brazil-New York City air-bridge to 20 hours.

In 1956, he appeared in the film Com Água na Boca singing the song Conceição. Cauby was invited for a tour to the US by Cardinal Spellman, in 1955, where she sang "Ave Maria" in the ship in which they were, where recorded, under the stage name of Ron Coby, and recorded several albums with the Orchestra of Paul Weston, singing in English. Cauby was going and returning from the United States between 1955 and 1958, Cauby had two artistic names in the United States, Ron Coby from 1955 to 1957, and Coby Dijon 1958 to 1959, Cauby arrived on the 5th place of most-played records in the US with a Compact Disc recorded on Epic Records. Ron Coby/Coby Dijon sang with Bing Crosby singing "Bahia", in 1955. In 1959, with Marlene Dietrich. With Carmen Miranda, in 1955, in Beverly Hills, California. Coby Dijon sang with Louis Armstrong and with his childhood idol, Nat King Cole, to whom he dedicated an album years later, in 2015. In 1979, with Elis Regina, with whom he recorded "O Bolero de Satã".

Cauby was named by Time and Life magazines as the Brazilian Elvis Presley.

In 1957, Cauby was the first Brazilian singer to record a rock song in Portuguese, the song Rock and Roll in Copacabana, composed by Miguel Gustavo, also author of the march "Pra frente, Brasil".

The singer was accompanied by the band The Snakes, formed by Arlenio, Erasmo Carlos, Edson Trindade and José Roberto (China). In the movie "Minha Sogra É da Policia" (1958), the group backs Cauby in the song "That's Rock", composed by Carlos Imperial. Cauby still would write the song "Enrolando o Rock" for the band "Betinho & Conjunto", after this quick passage by genre the singer would not more record rock songs.

In 1959, he returned to the US for a season of 14 months, during which he held concerts, appearances on television and recorded in English, the song Maracangalha (Dorival Caymmi), which received the title of I'Go (Music belonging to the 5th most played album in the US, proudly in the voice of a Brazilian, was a 78 rpm Compact Disc from Epic Records, recorded with the Paul Weston Orchestra). On a third visit to the US, some time after, participated in the Warner Brothers movie Jamboree. Throughout the 1960s, he limited his appearances to presentations in nightclubs. On his return to Brazil, he bought, in company with his brothers and sisters, the Carioca club Drink to dedicate themselves more the administration of the business and less performing.

From the 1970s, Cauby was often on television programs in Rio de Janeiro, and small seasons in nightclubs in Rio and São Paulo. In 1979 his professional roadmap included the cities of Vitória and Recife, in the Project Pixinguinha by Funarte, beside Zezé Gonzaga.

In 1980, in celebration of 25 years of career, the label Som Livre launched the album Cauby! Cauby!, with compositions written especially for him by Caetano Veloso (Cauby, Cauby), Chico Buarque (Bastidores), Tom Jobim (Oficina), Roberto Carlos and Erasmo Carlos (Brigas de Amor) and others. Bastidores, particularly, became one of the biggest successes of the repertoire of the singer. In the same year, presented in shows Bastidores (Funarte, Rio de Janeiro) and Cauby, Cauby os bons tempos voltaram, at the club Flag, in São Paulo.

In 1982, a season in 150 Night Club (SP), with the brothers Moacyr (pianist) and Araken (pistonista) and launched the LP Ângela & Cauby, the first meeting in disc with the Brazilian singer Ângela Maria, with songs such as Começaria Tudo Outra Vez (Gonzaguinha), Você aprendeu (Armando Manzanero), Recuerdos de Ipacaray (Z. of Mirkin and Demetrio Ortiz) and the waltz Boa Noite, Amor (José Maria de Abreu and Francisco Mattoso). Only in 1985, would be involved with the band Tokyo – the singer Supla – a rock-bolero called "Romântica", composed by members of the paulistan group.

In 1989, the 35 years of his career were commemorated in the bar and restaurant "A Baiuca" (São Paulo), beside the brothers Moacyr Peixoto, Araken Peixoto, Yracema Peixoto and Andyara Peixoto (voices). In the same year, the RGE reissue the 1957 LP "Quando Dois Peixotos São". In 1993 he was honored together with Ângela Maria, in the Sharp Award. It was launched by Columbia a box with two CDs covering the recordings from 1953 to 1959, with songs such as Conceição among others. He performed in the "Bar Brahma", in São Paulo for more than 13 years, with his guitarist, Ronaldo Rayol.

On 28 May 2015, Cauby was subject of a documentary (Cauby - I'd Start All Over Again) by Nelson Hoineff. The film has 90 minutes, and talks about his career. The film marked the reopening of Cine Odeon, Cauby speaks about his sexuality and other issues. the documentary was the most profitable and most successful of the year 2015 in Brazil.

Cauby Peixoto died of pneumonia on 15 May 2016, in São Paulo, after a week internee in a hospital. He was on tour in Brazil with the Brazilian singer Ângela Maria. The tour was celebrating sixty years of the career of each.

== Discography ==
- A Bossa de Cauby Peixoto (2015)
- Cauby sings Nat King Cole (2015)
- Especial Negue (2011)
- Reencontro (2013)
- Minha serenata (2012)
- Cauby, O mito (2011)
- Cauby sings Sinatra (2010)
- Cauby interpreta Roberto (2009)
- Cauby canta Baden (2006)
- A Bossa e o Swing de Cauby Peixoto (2004)
- Cauby Peixoto?! Graças á Deus (2003)
- Meu coração é um pandeiro (2000)
- Cauby canta as mulheres (1999)
- Focus. O essencial de Cauby Peixoto (1999)
- Millennium. Cauby Peixoto (1999)
- Série Brilhantes. Cauby Peixoto. Grandes sucessos (1999)
- Série Brilhantes. Cauby Peixoto (1998)
- 20 super sucessos. Cauby Peixoto, o professor da MPB (1998)
- Série Brilhantes. Cauby Peixoto, edição especial (1998)
- Série Aplauso. Cauby Peixoto (1996)
- Celebridades da MPB (Disco 1) (1996)
- Celebridades da MPB (Disco 2) (1996)
- 20 preferidas. Cauby Peixoto (1996)
- Cauby canta Sinatra • Som Livre (1995)
- Frente a frente. Cauby Peixoto & Sílvio Caldas (1995)
- Cauby! Cauby! (1994)
- Cauby Peixoto. Estrelas solitárias (1994)
- Cauby/O que será de mim.. (1994)
- Acervo. Cauby Peixoto (1993)
- Acervo especial. Cauby Peixoto (1993)
- Cauby. Grandes emoções (1993)
- Cauby Peixoto (1993)
- A arte do espetáculo ao vivo (1993)
- Ângela & Cauby (1993)
- Ângela & Cauby ao vivo (1993)
- A arte do espetáculo ao vivo. Cauby Peixoto (1992)
- Ângela & Cauby ao vivo (1992)
- Grandes emoções - Cauby Peixoto (1991)
- Convite para ouvir Cauby Peixoto (1991)
- Cauby, Elizeth e Nora Ney (1988)
- Cauby é show (1988)
- Presença de Cauby Peixoto (1988)
- Quando os Peixoto se encontram (1988)
- Cauby Peixoto, Ângela Maria & Agnaldo Timóteo (1987)
- Cauby! (1986)
- Cauby Peixoto. Só sucessos (1985)
- Cauby Peixoto/Amparito • Top Tape (1985)
- Cauby Peixoto, Agostinho dos Santos, Altemar Dutra, Nélson Gonçalves e Jessé/Série Brilho (1983)
- Estrelas solitárias • Som Livre/Sigma (1982)
- Ângela & Cauby • EMI/Odeon (1982)
- Cauby! Cauby! • Som Livre (1980)
- Cauby Peixoto • RCA Victor (1980)
- Cauby. O que será de mim (1980)
- Cauby sempre Cauby (1980)
- Cauby Peixoto (1979)
- Cauby • Som Livre (1976)
- Ângela Maria & Cauby Peixoto no Canecão (1976)
- Superstar • Odeon (1972)
- Os grandes sucesos de Cauby • Tropicana (1972)
- Cauby interpreta • Fênix (1972)
- Os grandes sucessos de Cauby Peixoto (1972)
- Os grandes sucessos de Cauby Peixoto (1969)
- O explosivo Cauby Peixoto • Fermata (1969)
- Os grandes sucessos românticos de Cauby Peixoto (1969)
- Os grandes sucessos de Cauby Peixoto (1969)
- Os maiores sucessos de Cauby Peixoto (1969)
- Um Drink com Cauby e Leny - Cauby Paixoto e Leny Eversong (1968)
- Cauby Peixoto. Porque só penso em ti (1967)
- Cauby canta para ouvir e dançar (1965)
- Grandes interpretações/Cauby Peixoto (1965)
- Porque só penso em ti (1965)
- Cauby intérpreta... (1964)
- Tamanco no samba/A noite de ontem (1963)
- Tudo lembra você (1963)
- Minhas namoradas/Madrepérola (1962)
- O poeta chorou/Aleli (1962)
- Enamorada/E os céus choraram (1962)
- Lambuzando o selo/Quebranto (1962)
- Ave Maria dos namorados/Canção que inspirou você (1962)
- Canção que inspirou você. Cauby Peixoto (1962)
- Os grandes sucessos de Cauby Peixoto (1962)
- Duelo/Brigas (1961)
- Perdão para dois (1961)
- Cauby canta novos sucessos (1961)
- Marina/Drink na praia (1960)
- De degrau em degrau/Me deixa em paz (1960)
- Mack the knife/Vila de Santa Bernadette (1960)
- Lealdade/Ninguém é de ninguém (1960)
- Se foi passado/No mundo da lua (1960)
- O sucesso na voz de Cauby Peixoto (1960)
- Noite/Close to you (1959)
- Porque e para que/Inveja (1959)
- Seu amigo Cauby cantando para você (1959)
- Os grandes sucessos de Cauby (1959)
- Nono mandamento/Meu amor por você (1958)
- Linda/Enrolando o rock (1958)
- Toreador/Viver sem você (1958)
- Simplesmente/Bela Nápoli (1958)
- Volare/Triste paixão (1958)
- Cartilha de amor/Primeiro mandamento (1958)
- Quero você/Tammy (1958)
- Música e romance - Cauby Peixoto (1958)
- Nosso amigo Cauby (1958)
- Serenata/As três lágrimas (1957)
- Garotas de Portugal/Outro dia virá (1957)
- Rock'n'roll em Copacabana/Amor verdadeiro (1957)
- Anastácia/Onde ela mora (1957)
- Não fale de mim/Espera-me no céu (1957)
- Melodia do céu/Você e eu (1957)
- O louco/Tinha que ser (1957)
- Ouvindo Cauby (1957)
- Os pobres do Brasil/Ser triste sozinho (1957)
- Abandonado/Se adormeço (1957)
- Final de amor/A pérola e o rubi (1957)
- É tão msublime o amor/Sem teu amor (1957)
- Quando os Peixotos se encontram (1957)
- Prece de amor. Cauby Peixoto (1957)
- Blue Gardenia (1956)
- O show vai começar (1956)
- "Você, a música e Cauby" (1956)
- Lisboa antiga/Tentação (1956)
- Molambo/Amor não é brinquedo (1956)
- Conceição/Bibape do Ceará (1956)
- Canção do mar/Volta ao passado (1956)
- Siga/Acaso (1956)
- Prece ao amor/Lamento noturno (1956)
- Canção do rouxinol (1956)
- Nada além/Flor do asfalto (1956)
- Cajú nasceu pra cachaça/Ter saudade (1956)
- Amor cigano/Um sorriso e um olhar (1955)
- Esperei por você/Tu, só tu (1955)
- Superstição/Mambo do galinho (1955)
- Tarde fria/Ci-ciu-ci, canção do rouxinol (1955)
- Nem toda flor tem perfume/Cabo frio (1955)
- Palácio de pobre/Criado-mudo (1954)
- Vaya con Dios/Elvira/ (1954)
- Blue gardênia/Só desejo você (1954)
- Daqui para a eternidade/Triste melodia (1954)
- Mil mulheres/Se você pensa (1954)
- Tudo lembra você/O teu beijo (1953)
- Aula de amor/Ando sozinho (1953)
- Caruaru/Mulher boato (1953)
- Saia branca/Ai que carestia (1951)

== Filmography ==
- Carnaval em Marte, cantando "Se você pensa" (1955)
- Aí vem o general, cantando "Mil mulheres" (1955)
- Com água na boca, cantando "Conceição" (1956)
- Com jeito vai, cantando "Melodia do céu" (1957)
- Canjerê (1957)
- Chico Fumaça, cantando "Onde ela mora" (1957)
- Tagarela (1957)
- Metido a bacana, cantando "O teu cabelo não nega" (1957)
- Jamboreé, cantando "El toreador" (1957)
- De pernas pro ar, cantando "Nono mandamento" (1958)
- Minha sogra é da polícia, cantando "That's rock" (1958)
- O donzelo, cantando "Vagador" (1970)
- O corpo, cantando "Blue gardenia" (1992)
- Ed mort, cantando "Bastidores" (1997)
