= Post Office Palace (São Paulo) =

Historic building in São Paulo, Brazil

- Palácio dos Correios
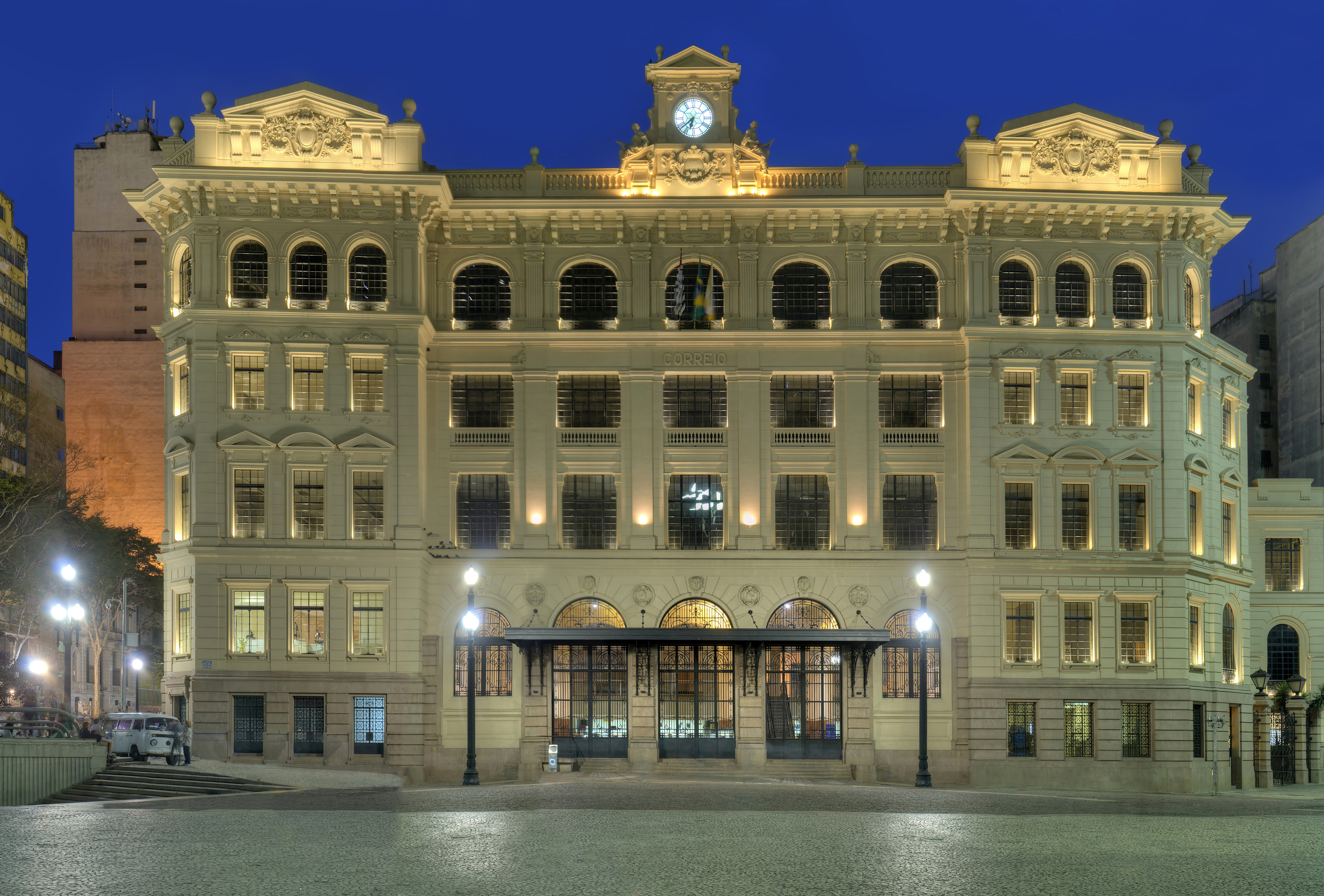
- Main facade of the Post Office Palace
- Interactive map of the Post Office Palace area

General information
- Type: Palace; Exhibition center
- Architectural style: Eclecticism
- Location: São Paulo, São Paulo; Brazil
- Coordinates: 23°32′37″S 46°38′11″W
- Construction started: October 7, 1920; 105 years ago
- Inaugurated: October 20, 1922; 103 years ago

Technical details
- Floor count: 5
- Floor area: 15.000

Design and construction
- Architects: Domiziano Rossi; Felisberto Ranzini

Website
- https://www.correios.com.br/educacao-e-cultura/centros-e-espacos-culturais/centro-cultural-sao-paulo

The Post Office Palace (Portuguese: Palácios dos Correios) is an eclectic building located in the Historic Center of São Paulo, in the Anhangabaú Valley, in the Brazilian city of São Paulo. The complex was designed by Ramos de Azevedo Technical Office to house the Central Post and Telegraph Office and was inaugurated on October 20, 1922. It housed the Post Office's administrative activities until the 1970s, when the institution moved to Vila Leopoldina.

In 2012, the building was listed as a historic site by the Department of Historical Heritage (DPH) during a process that covered the entire Anhangabaú Valley region. It is one of the most significant examples of early 20th century architecture in São Paulo. In 2013, the Palace became home to the Post Office Cultural Center of São Paulo, which offers free exhibitions and other artistic events.

== History ==
=== Project and inauguration ===
After the Proclamation of the Republic in 1889, the postal service underwent an expansion of its activities. After a visit to São Paulo in 1918, President Venceslau Brás found it necessary to build a new Post Office and Telegraphs building, which had been operating in a rented space in Largo do Colégio with precarious hygiene and safety conditions. The construction was then approved by the 1921 Budget Law.

The site chosen for the construction was the former Military Hospital and São João Market. Architects Domiziano Rossi and Felisberto Ranzini, from Ramos de Azevedo Technical Office, were responsible for the project. On October 7, 1920, the cornerstone of the new building was laid with the presence of King Albert I of Belgium and many other prominent political and social figures. The eclectic-style structure was inaugurated on October 20, 1922, as part of the celebrations for the centenary of Brazil's independence.

The Post Office Palace underwent an internal remodeling in the mid-1950s and between October 1978 and March 1979; in the latter, the renovation was also external, and aimed at cleaning the building, which was restored to its original condition. Three plaques marking the inauguration and the other two renovations of the premises can be found in the lobby.

Captain Major General, Governor Antonio Manoel de Mello Castro e Mendonça, builder of the Old Royal Military Hospital of São Paulo, was the one who established the first official public mail lines in São Paulo on July 23, 1798.

=== Change of address ===
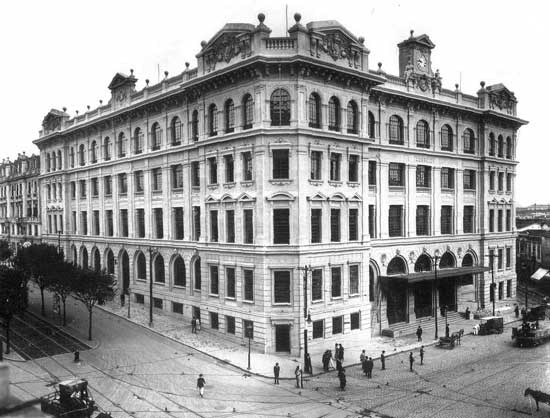
The palace in October 1922.

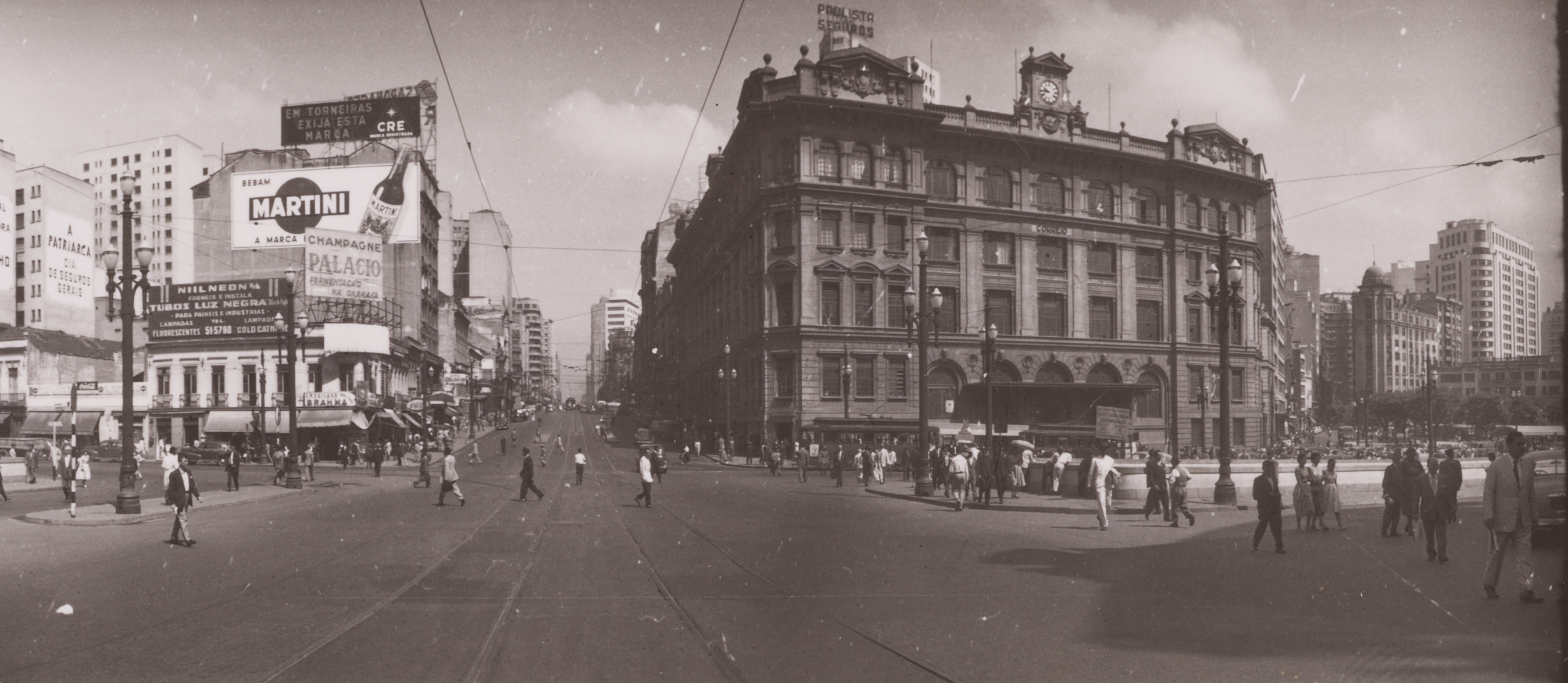
The Post Office building seen from the Anhangabaú Valley. In front, Avenida São João; to the right, the wall of Buraco do Ademar.

The building served its original function of concentrating the administrative activities of the Correios (Brazilian Post and Telegraph Company) until the 1970s. After that, the institution moved to another address in Vila Leopoldina and the palace housed only general post services. To this end, it underwent a renovation in 1978, which included changes to the internal divisions, lowering the ceiling and installing elevators.

=== Architectural competition ===
In 1997, the Correios held a national architectural competition, in which the competing firms had to draw up proposals for adapting the building's facilities into a cultural center. Some renovations were made to the palace, but the project was never fully implemented.

=== Inauguration of the Cultural Center ===
The first major restoration of the Post Office Palace began in 2005 as part of a City Hall initiative to revitalize the center of São Paulo. The project, which cost R$10 million, aimed to maintain the building's original features and install a cultural center on the upper floors. The space was inaugurated in 2013 under the name Centro Cultural Correios de São Paulo (English: Post Office Cultural Center of São Paulo) with two exhibition halls, aiming to reach a wider audience with a different program. The venue presents exhibitions on subjects such as humanities, music and visual arts, all in an accessible way, gathering in the same space both renowned and emerging artists, giving them the possibility of recognition and credibility.

Some of the exhibitions the cultural center has hosted since its inauguration include: O Rio de Debret, with 120 watercolors by the French artist Jean-Baptiste Debret depicting life in the city of Rio de Janeiro in the period between the Colony and the Empire; the presentation by the artist Elifas Andreato, an important figure in the Brazilian popular music and theater scene, which brings together some of the main works produced by the artist over the course of his half-century career, in a trajectory linked to the golden age of Brazilian popular music, the fight against the military regime and the affirmation of Brazilian cultural identity; and the exhibition Sobrevoo by multimedia artist Marcos Amaro, featuring twenty large and medium-sized works made up of sculptures, three-dimensional collages and aeronautical waste materials.

== Architecture ==
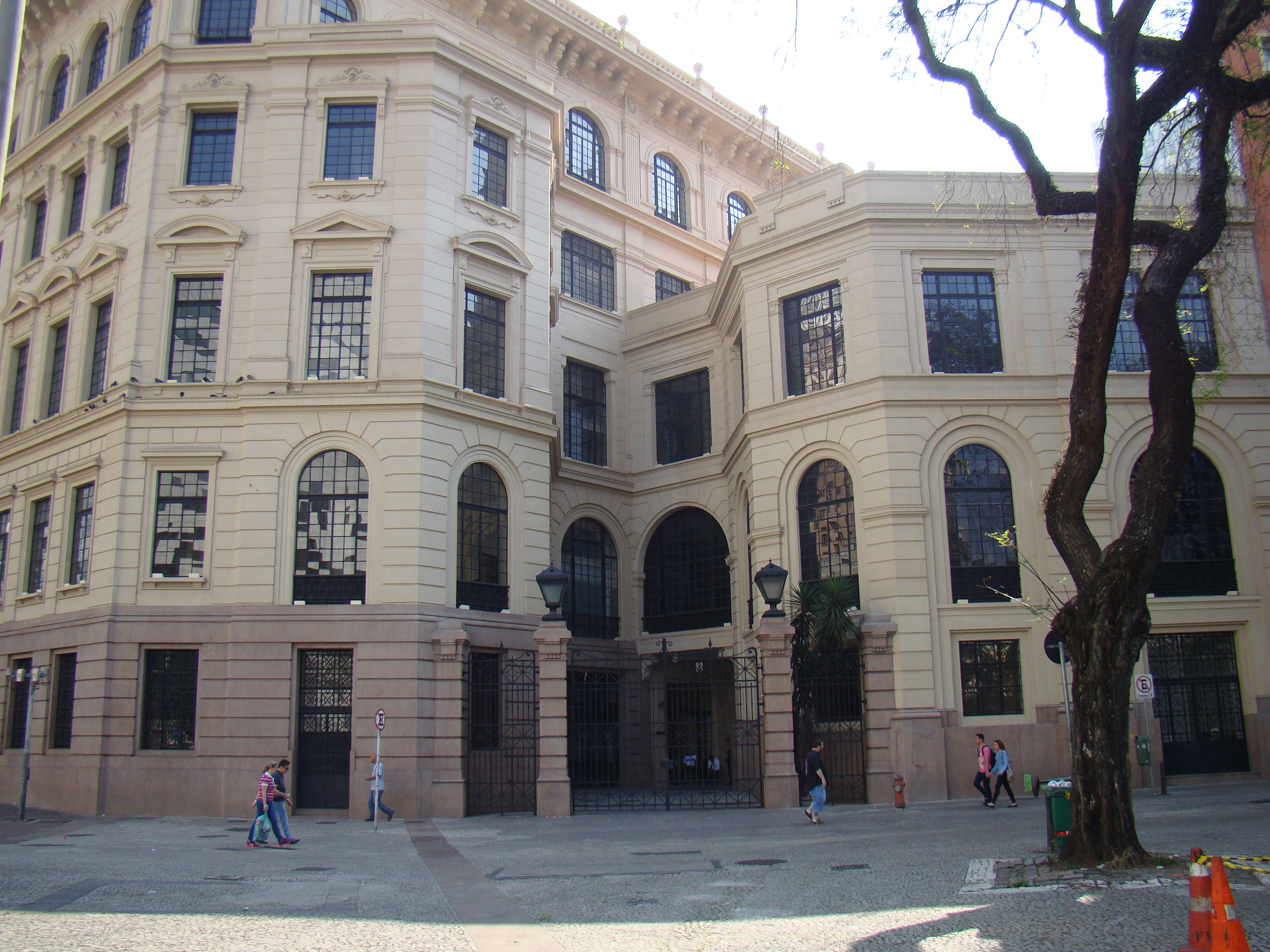
Secondary block of the complex.

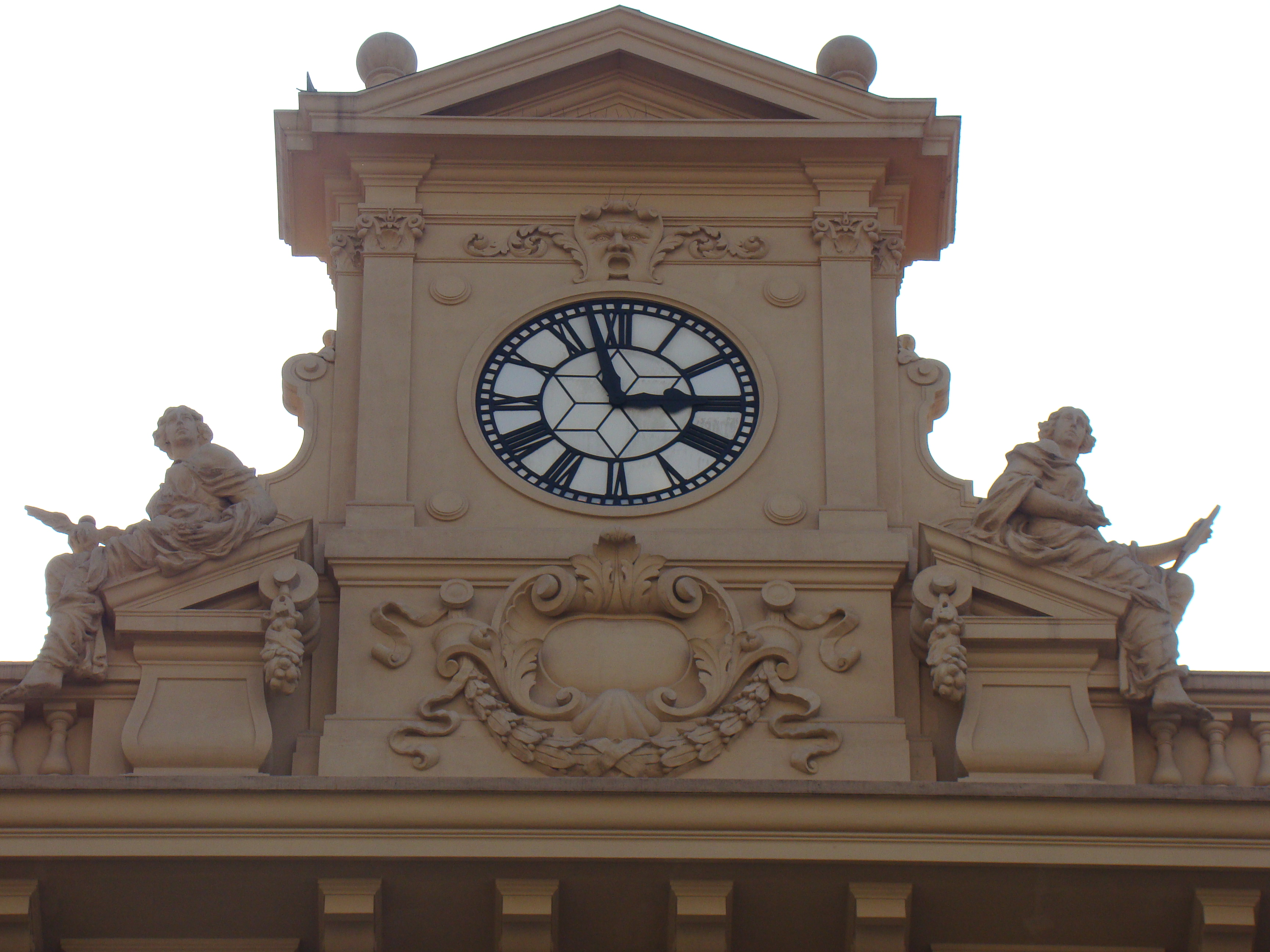
Clock crowning the building.

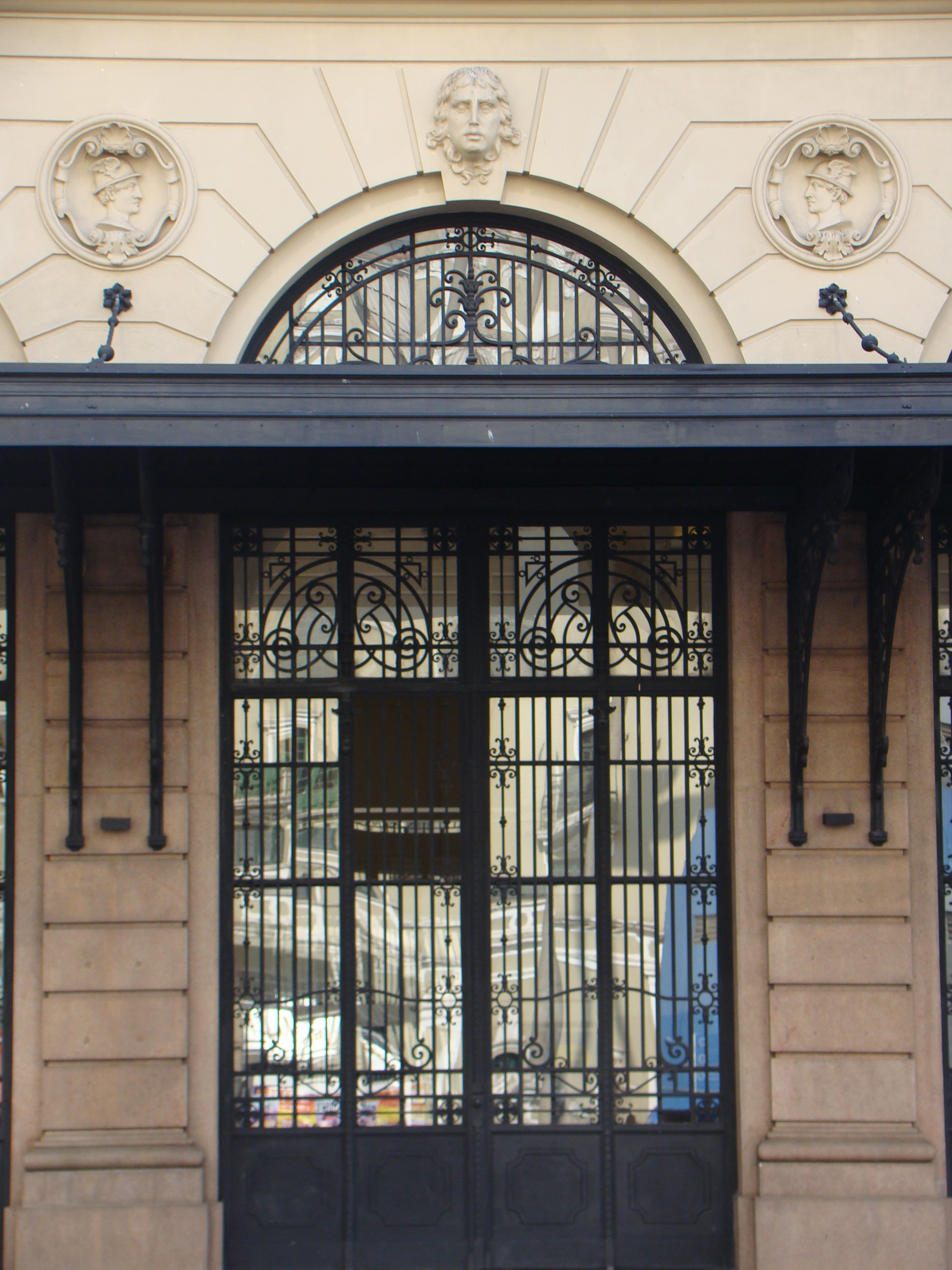
Metalwork on the main doors.

The Post Office Palace, with its 15,000 m² of built area, has predominantly eclectic features. The building also has neoclassical lines and Renaissance influences, which characterized the public building projects of the Ramos de Azevedo Technical Office. Together with the former Central and Britânia hotels, it is part of a group of eclectic buildings in the area between the Anhangabaú Valley and Largo do Paiçandu.

=== Facade ===
The complex consists of a large main building with four floors and a basement, and a secondary block with three floors. The facade is divided into three parts, which gives continuity to the structure visual. The central one, which faces Pedro Lessa Square, has windows on the second and third floors framed by columns. The side, facing Avenida São João, has narrow windows with a different treatment on the lintels. On the third floor, the windows are all full-arched. The complex is completed by a cornice and some decorated pediments and balusters. The main facade is crowned by a clock, which is surrounded by two merely ornamental human figures.

=== Materials and construction ===
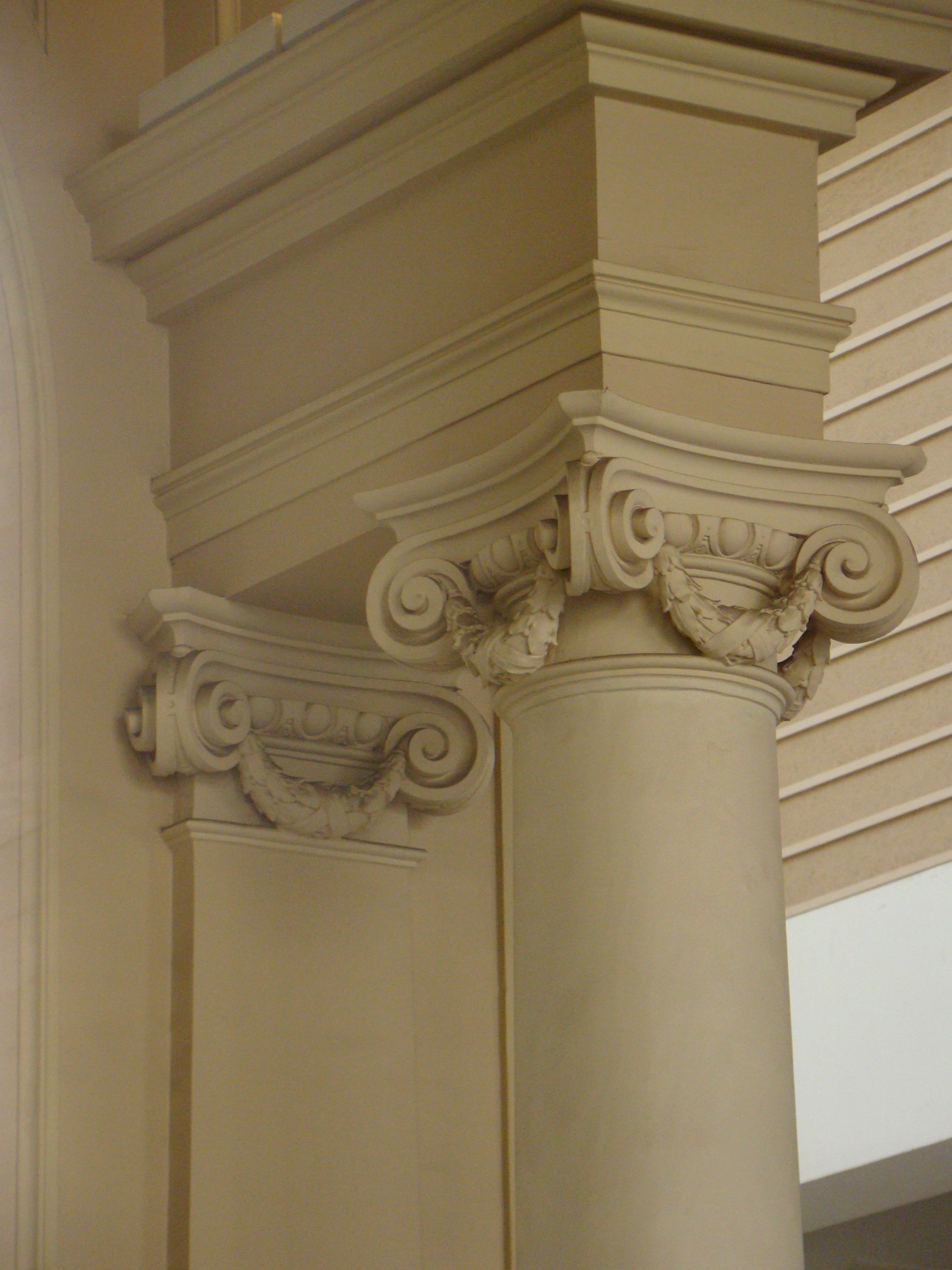
Columns inside the palace.

With the exception of some sections of the first floor, which were made of rough granite, the facade of the Post Office Palace is entirely covered in pigmented mortar. The porch has an iron structure and a wired glass roof. All the metalwork used in the construction was made by the São Paulo School of Arts and Crafts. Inside the building, the walls were painted with smooth mortar, with only a few pillars having two colors. The floor is covered in polished granite. The ceiling is made of plasterboard with a few light fittings.

=== 1997 Renovation ===
The project that won the competition promoted by the Correios in 1997 foresaw the creation of a large empty space in the center of the palace. To achieve this, a renovation was carried out that united two smaller spaces. The result was greater articulation between the different areas of the building and the creation of a more defined geometry around this void.

=== 2005-2013 Renovation ===
Focused on a cultural shelter and expanding its audience, the restoration that began in 2005 would not affect its primary structure, but would preserve the original structure and adapt its upper floors for the cultural center, scheduled to open in 2013. The new facilities included the São Paulo Central Agency, the D. Pedro II Philatelic Agency and the Post Office Cultural Center of São Paulo.

== Historical and cultural significance ==
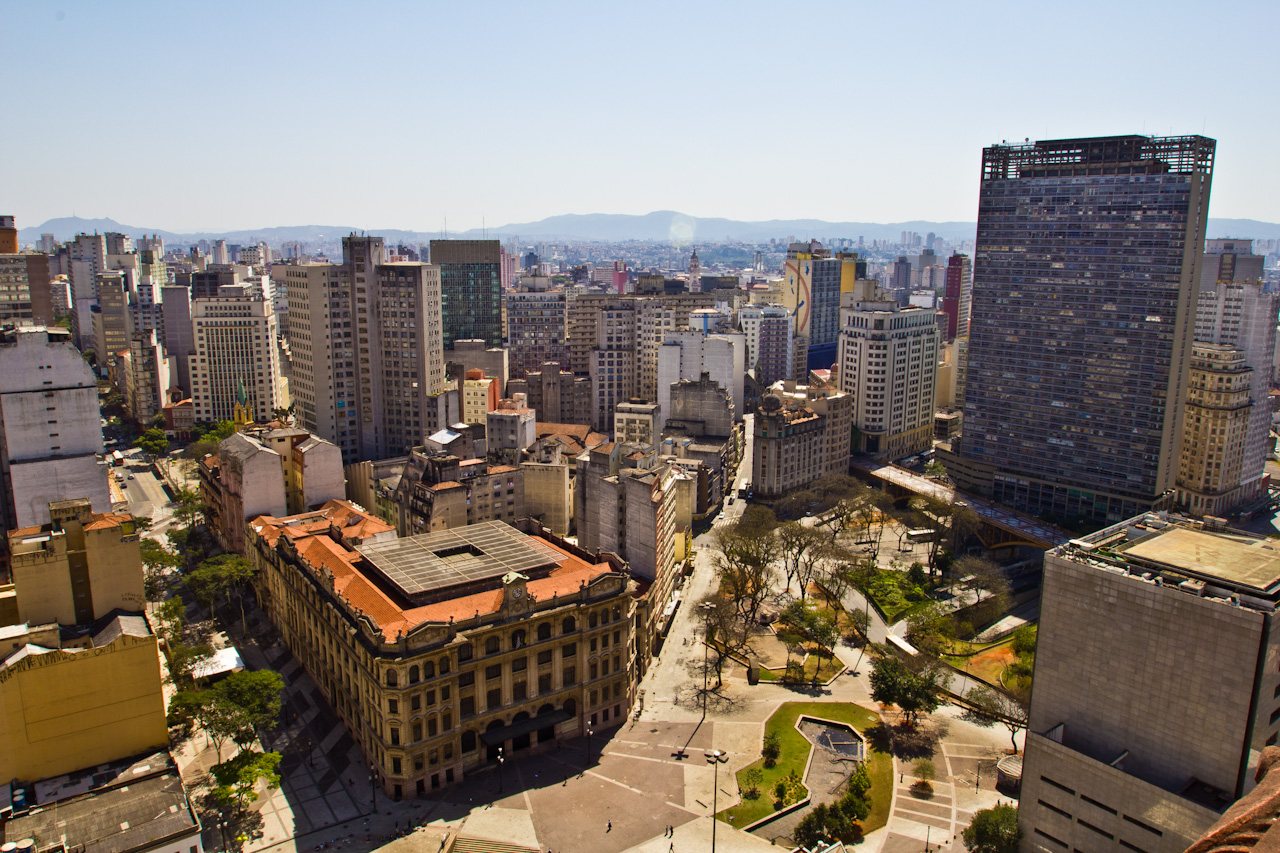
The area around the Post Office Palace.

Soon after its inauguration, the palace became a landmark in the capital's landscape, which led to Pedro Lessa Square becoming known as "Post Office Square". The construction of the building was part of a process of urbanization of the Anhangabaú Valley in the 1920s. At that time, the initial stretch of Avenida São João was widened and other eclectic buildings were constructed. Together with the Municipal Theater, the Martinelli Building and the Viaduto do Chá, it is part of an important architectural ensemble in the center of São Paulo.

In 2012, the Department of Historical Heritage (DPH) carried out an inventory of the central area of São Paulo. On that occasion, resolution 37/92 of the Municipal Council for the Preservation of the Historical, Cultural and Environmental Heritage (Conpresp) listed the region of the Anhangabaú Valley, of which the Post Office Palace is a part, as a historical site.

== Current status ==
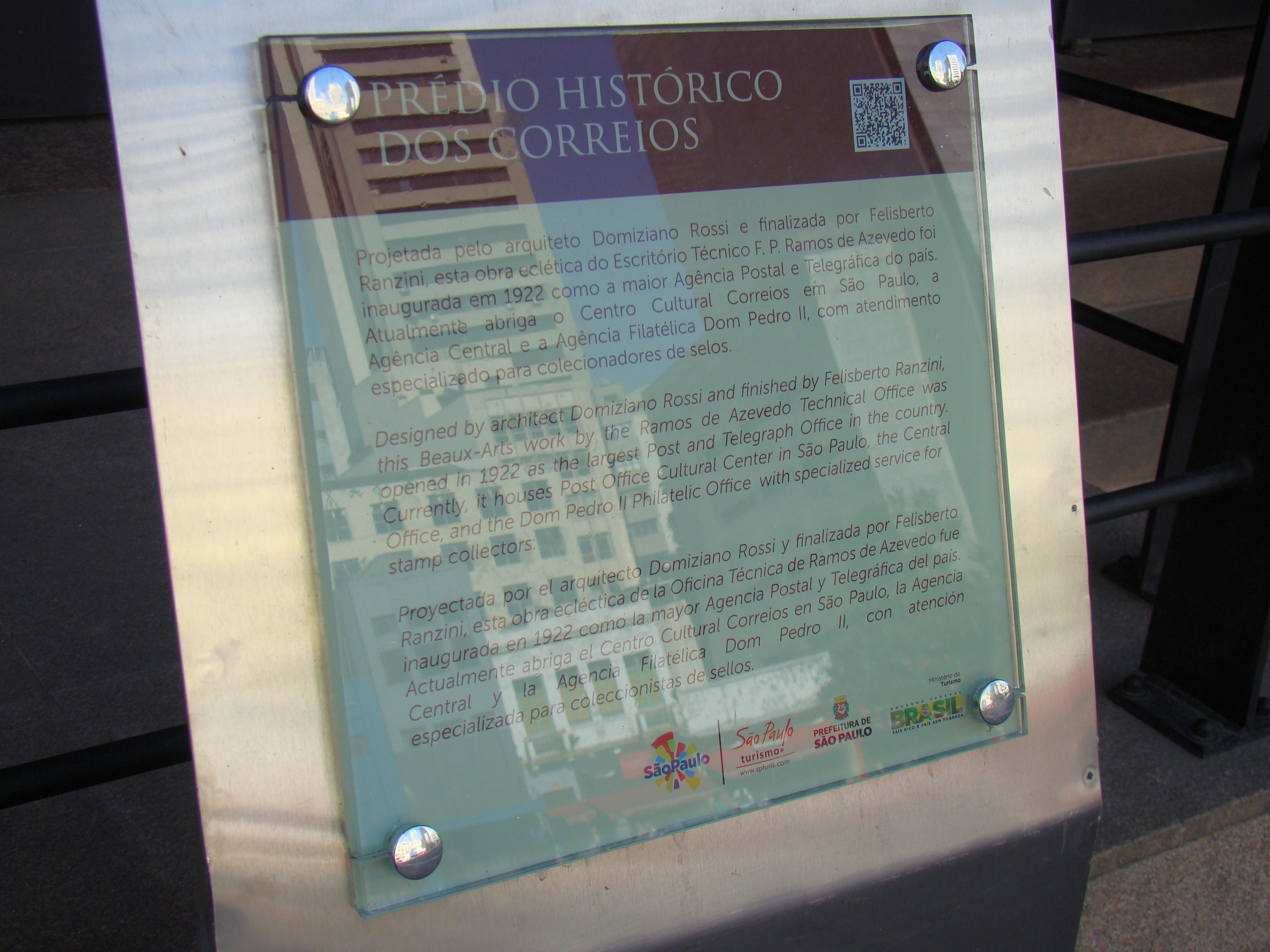
Information plaque about the building.

The latest restoration of the Post Office Palace, which began in 2005, was the largest ever carried out. During the process, most of the building's original features were maintained. The complex now houses the São Paulo Central Agency, the D. Pedro II Philatelic Agency, which provides specialized services for stamp collectors, and the Post Office Cultural Center of São Paulo. The latter was inaugurated in 2013 in a 1,280m² space with two exhibition halls and a central lobby. The cultural center's agenda is diverse, promoting activities in the fields of visual arts, humanities and music, for all social groups and all ages, generally with free attractions.

== See also ==
- Correios
- Tourism in the city of São Paulo
