= Rua Augusta (São Paulo) =

Street in São Paulo, Brazil

Coordinates: 23°33′25.0″S 46°39′32.3″W

Augusta Street
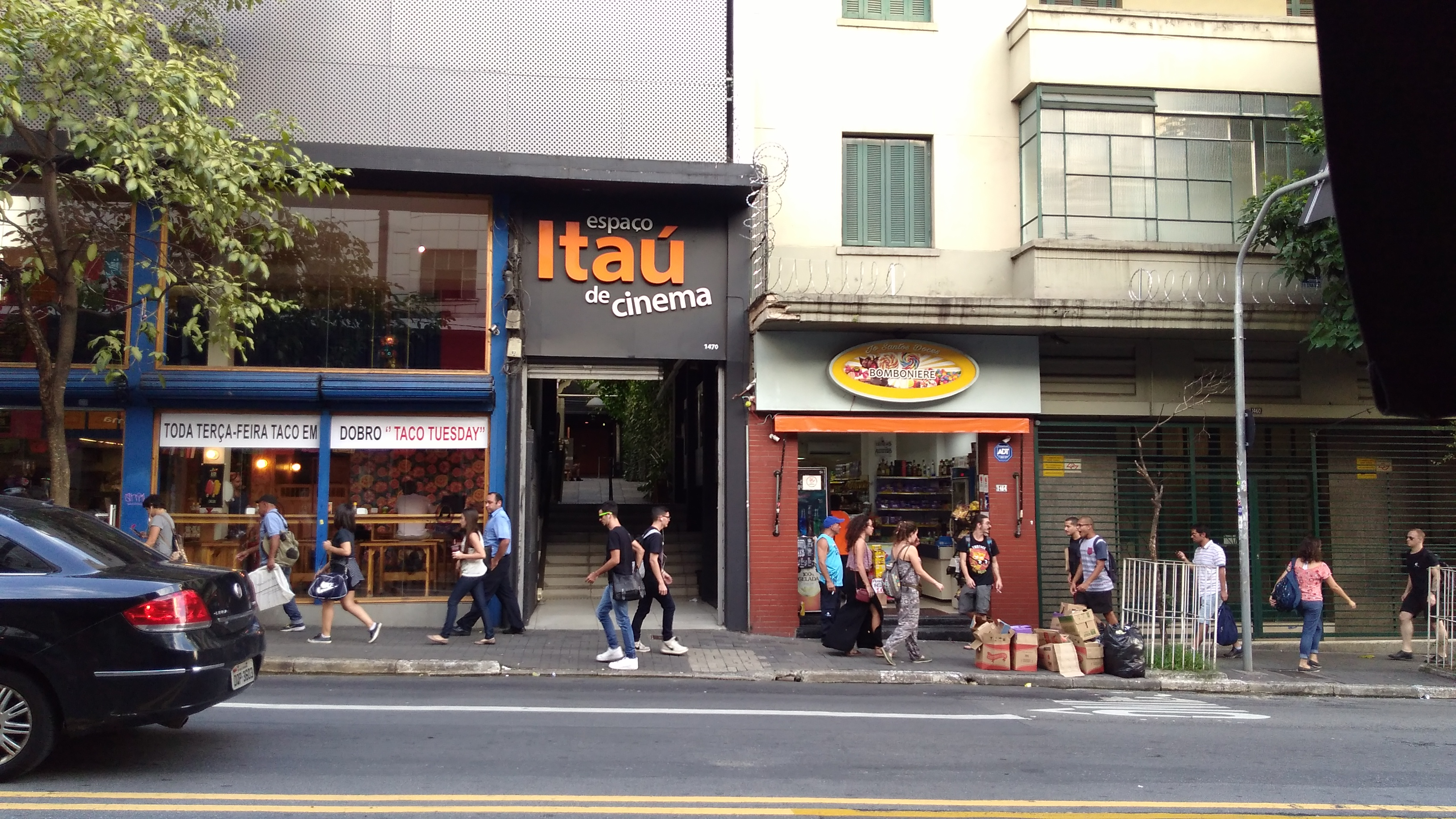
- Interactive map of Augusta Street
- Native name: Rua Augusta (Portuguese)
- Length: 3.020 km (1.877 mi)
- Location: São Paulo, Brazil
- From: Rua Martinho Prado, 212 near Praça Roosevelt
- To: Rua Colômbia, 26, crossing with Rua Estados Unidos, Jardins

Construction
- Inauguration: 1875

Rua Augusta is a street in São Paulo, Brazil, connecting the neighborhood of Jardins to the city's downtown. The upper part of the street, near Jardins is known as an upscale shopping street; the stretch known as Baixo Augusta (Lower Augusta), between the Paulista Avenue and Praça Roosevelt, is known by its nightlife, with clubs, bars and live music venues.

== History ==
The first references of the street date from 1875, first as Rua Maria Augusta; in 1897 the street already appears as Rua Augusta. The street was part of the lands of the Portuguese Mariano António Vieira, owner of Chácara do Capão farm since 1880, when he opened several streets in Bela sintra neighborhood, including Rua da Real Grandeza, current Avenida Paulista. Vieira decided to open a dirt trail, since the roads were very steep, to install donkey-pulled trams, in 1890. In 1891, with the inauguration of electric lights, the trams were powered by electricity.

Between 1910 and 1912 the street was extended to Rua Álvaro de Carvalho, becoming officialized in 1927. Until 1942 Rua Martins Fontes was part of Rua Augusta. The street gradually became a major prostitution point, at which time it was dismembered (Decree Law No. 153). From the opposite side, towards Jardins, its stretch to the Rua Estados Unidos was made official in 1914.
