= Joelma Building fire =

Skyscraper fire in Brazil in 1974

Coordinates: 23°32′58″S 46°38′26″W

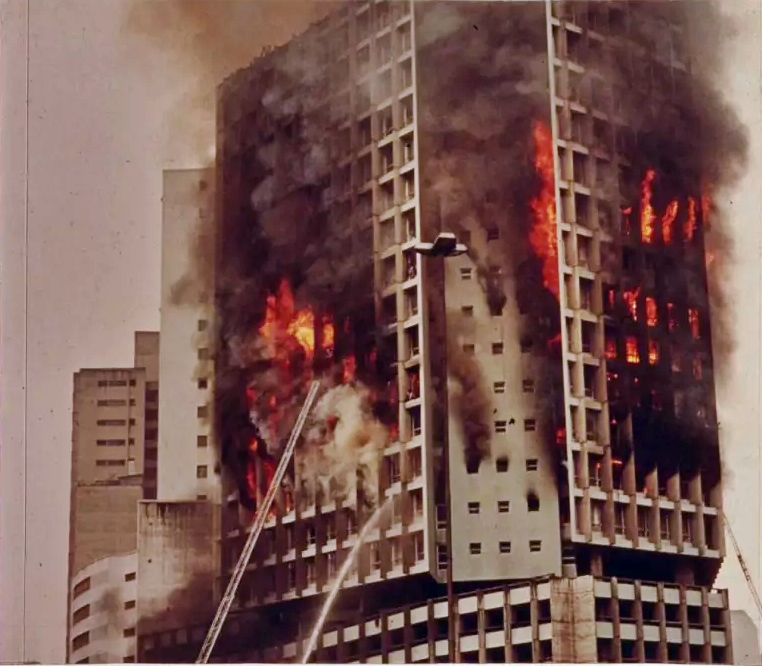
- The building on fire while firefighters attempt to extinguish it
- Date: 1 February 1974
- Location: São Paulo, Brazil
- Deaths: 179-189
- Injuries: 300+

Edifício Praça da Bandeira, formerly known as the Joelma Building, is a 25-story building in downtown São Paulo, Brazil, completed in 1971, located at Avenida 9 de Julho, 225. On 1 February 1974, an air conditioning unit on the twelfth floor overheated, starting a fire. Because flammable materials had been used to furnish the interior, the entire building was engulfed in flames within twenty minutes. Of the 756 people occupying the building at the time, 179 were killed and 300 injured.

The Joelma Building fire happened less than two years after another deadly fire in downtown São Paulo, that of the Andraus Building. As of 2021, the Joelma fire remains the second-worst skyscraper fire ever in terms of the death toll, after the collapse of the World Trade Center in New York City on September 11, 2001.

== Fire safety problems ==
While the Joelma Building is a reinforced fire-resistant concrete hull construction, its interior was furnished with flammable items. Partitions, desks and chairs were made of wood, while ceilings were composed of cellulose fiber tiles set in wood strappings. The curtains and carpets were also flammable.

At the time, no emergency lights, fire alarms, fire sprinkler systems, or emergency exits were installed in the building. There were only elevators and a common stairwell, which both ran the full height of the building. An air conditioning unit on the twelfth floor, which started the fire, needed a special type of circuit breaker, which was unavailable at the time it was installed. In order to use this unit, it was installed bypassing the twelfth floor electrical control panel.

== Fire ==
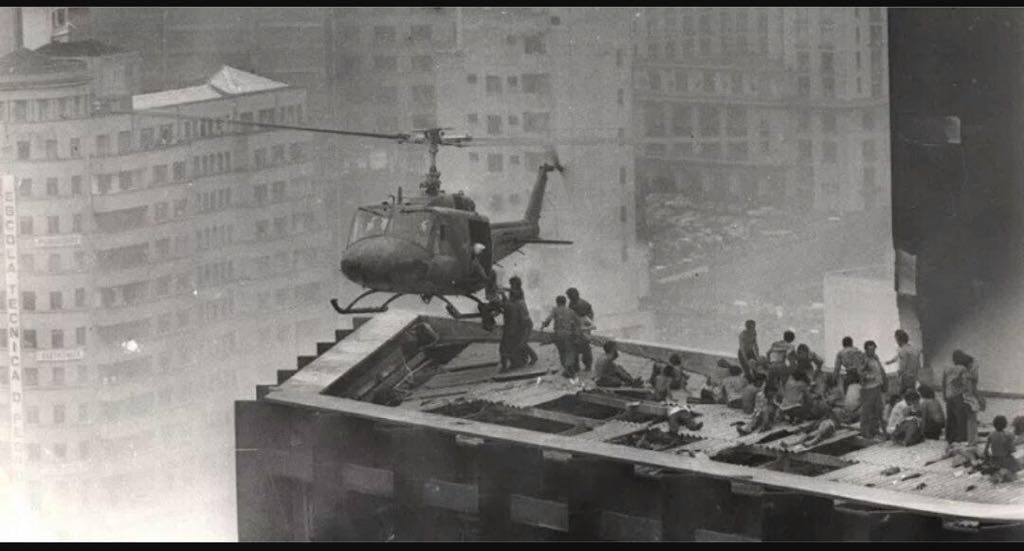
A UH-1H helicopter attempts to evacuate survivors from the rooftop of the building following the fire.

The fire occurred on 1 February 1974 at 8:50 a.m., when the faulty 12th-floor air conditioning unit short circuited. The building was primarily occupied by a single banking company, Banco Crefisul S/A, of which 756 employees were present. A person in an adjacent building reported the fire and first responders arrived on the scene at 9:10 a.m. Assistance was requested and further units arrived at 9:30 a.m., by which time flames were nearly to the roof of the building. The fire reached the building's only stairwell and climbed as high as the fifteenth floor. It did not reach any higher because of a lack of flammables in the stairwell, but it filled the stairwell with smoke and heat, making it impassable. Fire crews attempted to gain access using the stairwell, but could not go any higher than the eleventh floor.

Initial efforts led to the successful evacuation of some 300 employees before the heat and smoke became too overwhelming. Approximately 300 more people were evacuated using the elevators, a practice that is not recommended by fire officials. The four elevator operators were only able to make a few trips, however, before conditions within the building made it impossible to continue. Many remaining employees climbed onto balconies for air and a group of 171 individuals fled to the roof. A helicopter rescue was attempted but the heat, smoke and inadequate landing space prevented them from reaching the roof until well after the fire had burned out at 3 p.m. Even if landing space had been available, the heat and smoke made approaching the building by helicopter extremely hazardous. Approximately 80 people hid under the tiles on the roof of the building; they were found alive.

Despite the best efforts of rescue personnel and witnesses, who shouted and created signs encouraging people to remain calm, 40 individuals jumped to escape the conditions inside and in failed attempts to grasp unreachable fire ladders. None of these jumpers survived. Thirteen people who tried to escape using one of the elevators died of smoke inhalation and their bodies were burnt by the fire; they were never identified and are buried in anonymous graves at the Vila Alpina Cemetery.

Thanks to the firefighters, by 10:30 a.m., the fire started to decrease. Four-and-a-half hours later, it had engulfed all flammables and simply burned itself out. Medical teams, fire crews and police were then able to enter the building and search for survivors. At the time, the fire had been the greatest death toll in any such disaster in a high-rise building. Death toll estimates range from 179 to 189.

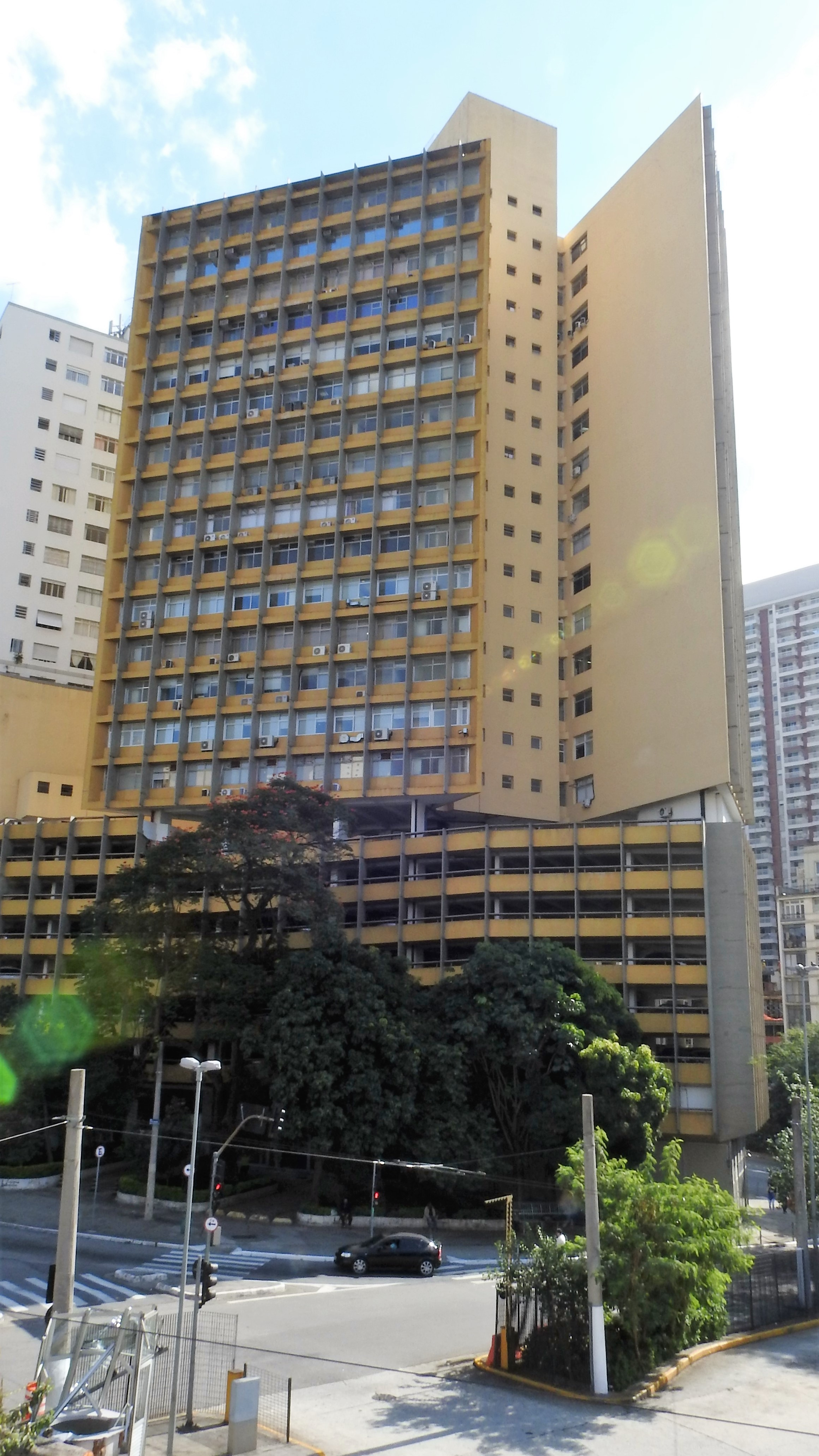
The renovated building pictured in 2016

=== Aftermath ===
The Joelma Building remained closed for four years for reconstruction. Once reconstructed, it was renamed Praça da Bandeira ("Flag Square," the name of a former square facing the building). in 2000.

The fire became a landmark case that led to changes in fire safety regulations not only in Brazil, but all over the world. For instance, Los Angeles enacted Regulation 10, which mandated all new buildings taller than 75 feet (23 m) to have a rooftop helipad for emergency fire evacuation, in response to the Joelma fire. Regulation 10 was rescinded in 2014 after petitioning by the builders of the 73-story Wilshire Grand Center, who designed a reinforced concrete central core into the building.

In 2013, newspaper Folha de S. Paulo asked a fire safety specialist to inspect both the Joelma and Andraus buildings. He found that the renovated Joelma exceeded current fire safety regulations, many of which were enacted exactly because of the two fires. Joelma even had tactile floors for blind people in the escape routes; this is not mandatory. Andraus failed the same inspection.
