= Bar Brahma =

Bar in São Paulo, Brazil

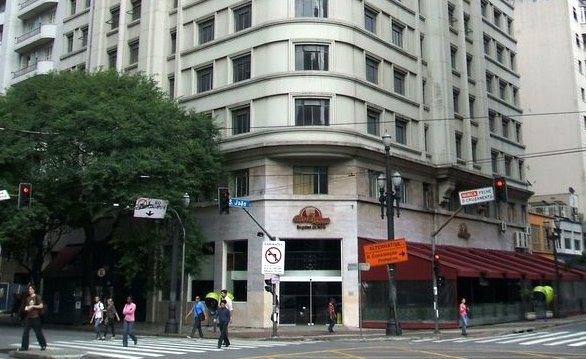
- Bar Brahma façade in downtown São Paulo
- Interactive map of Bar Brahma

Restaurant information
- Established: 1948
- Food type: Brazilian cuisine, Draft beer
- Dress code: Casual
- Location: Avenida São João, 677, São Paulo, São Paulo, 01035-100, Brazil
- Coordinates: 23°32′41″S 46°38′42″W
- Reservations: Yes
- Other locations: Former Aeroclube branch
- Other information: Live music
- Website: www.barbrahmacentro.com

Bar Brahma is a traditional bar located in the city center of São Paulo, Brazil. The bar was founded in 1948 by German immigrant Henrique Hillebrecht.

The bar soon became a meeting place for important personalities from the academic and political circles of the city of São Paulo, such as former mayor Jânio Quadros, former governor Adhemar de Barros and professor and former president Fernando Henrique Cardoso, as well as being a stronghold for the artistic world of São Paulo, bringing together musicians such as Adoniran Barbosa, Orlando Silva, Ary Barroso, Vicente Celestino, among others.

In the 1960s, the bar became a hub for political discussions led by students from the University of São Paulo’s Faculty of Law, while also serving as a meeting point for farmers from São Paulo's countryside. In the following decades, the bar followed the deterioration of part of São Paulo's downtown area, eventually closing its doors in the early 1990s. It reopened in 1997 under the name “São João 677”, but closed down the following year, in December.

In 2001, it was reopened with its original name. The bar is located in one of the most famous addresses in the center of São Paulo, on the corner of Ipiranga and São João avenues, a crossroads eternalized in the Brazilian song Sampa, by the bahian singer Caetano Veloso. In 2008, the bar welcomed an average of 700 customers daily. The bar has a regular schedule of live shows, featuring frequent performances. Important names in Brazilian music such as Cauby Peixoto, Angela Maria, Demônios da Garoa, Angela Ro Ro and Nana Caymmi have already performed there. Known for its musical appeal, in 2008 the band Conjunto Varanda Paulista recorded an album entitled Ao vivo no Bar Brahma (Live at the Brahma Bar), mixing elements of bossa nova and samba.

In 2023, in the midst of a robbery and further deterioration in the central region of São Paulo, the bar was attacked with stones, causing physical insecurity for the bar's customers and workers. After the act, the bar demanded greater security from the mayor of São Paulo, Ricardo Nunes, and the governor, Tarcísio de Freitas, for greater security in the center of São Paulo. In response, Nunes promised to increase the number of police officers responsible for policing the center by 1,500.

== See also ==
- Brahma beer
- Central Zone of São Paulo
- Avenida São João
