= Andraus Building =

Building in São Paulo, Brazil

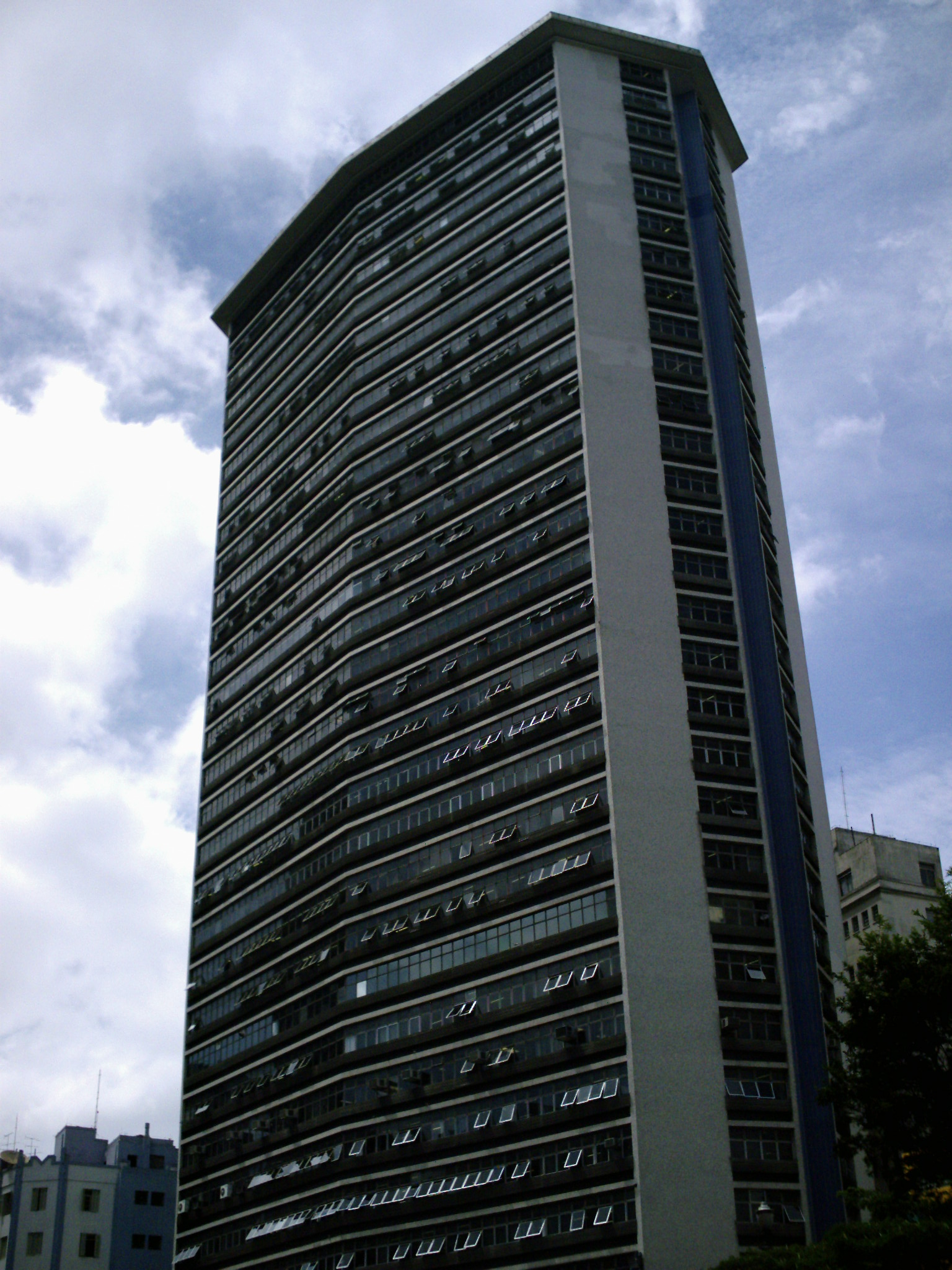

- Location within São Paulo Location within Brazil

General information
- Location: Rua Pedro Américo, 32, São Paulo, Brazil
- Coordinates: 23°32′29″S 46°38′32″W
- Inaugurated: 1962

Height
- Height: 115 m (377 ft)

Technical details
- Floor count: 32

The Andraus Building is a building in the República area of downtown São Paulo, Brazil, on the corner of Avenida São João and Pedro Américo Street. It is 115 metres tall and has 32 floors, and its construction ended in 1962. On 24 February 1972, the building suffered a great fire which caused the deaths of 16 persons trapped inside the building. 330 others were also injured. The building was renovated after the fire, and currently houses municipal and federal government offices.

== Fire ==
A possible cause of the fire would have been an electrical system overload. The fire occurred at 4:15 PM on Thursday, 24 February 1972, on the second floor and engulfed the entire building, which contained several corporate offices, among them German multinational companies Henkel and Siemens. Since restoration, the building has housed public offices and is known as the Pirani Building, after a former department store that used to occupy the lower floors before the fire.

Although the building is associated with the fatal fire, it nevertheless has significant architectural value, being a renowned skyscraper of São Paulo with a notable geometric shape.

=== Victims ===
Among the fatalities were two executives at Henkel: Paul Jürgen Pondorf, President of the company, and Ottmar Flick. The corporate offices were a total loss. Most survivors of the tragedy, unable to use the emergency stairs, chose to climb to the top floor of the building, where they remained until firefighters were able to get the fire under control. Many were later rescued via helicopter by the pilot Olendino de Souza. The fire had burned out at 11:00PM.

=== Consequences ===
The fire was covered live on television broadcasts and the scenes of people throwing themselves from the windows shocked the world. This sparked discussions about fire safety regulations for high-rise buildings, an aspect largely neglected until then. These discussions gained added impetus from an even greater tragedy, the fire at the Joelma Building, which occurred two years later in São Paulo.

In 2013, the newspaper Folha de S.Paulo reported that the fire safety measures in Andraus still were substandard.

== See also ==
- Joelma Building
- Skyscraper fire
