= Praça Roosevelt =

Coordinates: 23.5487°S 46.6466°W

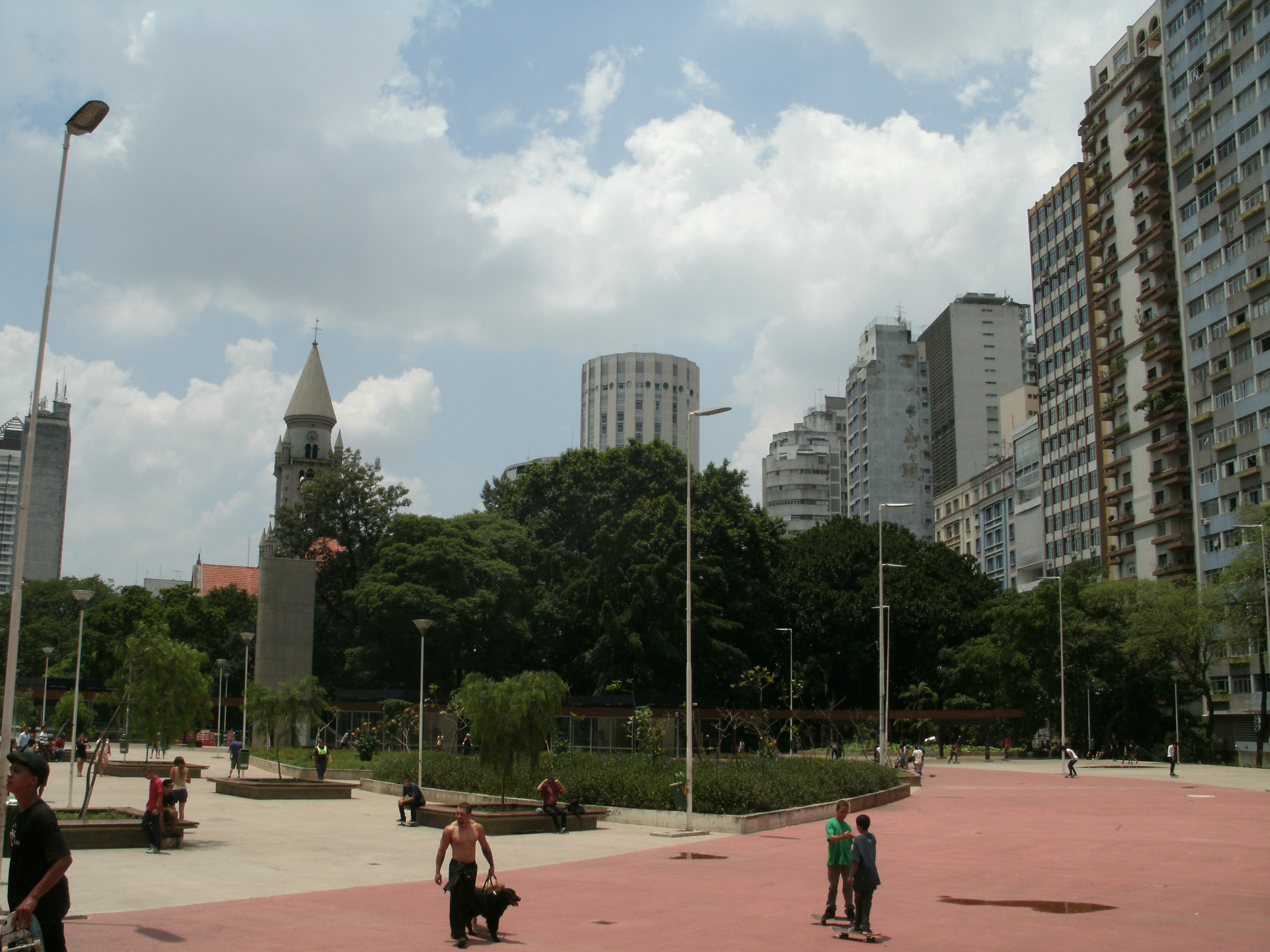
Praça Roosevelt

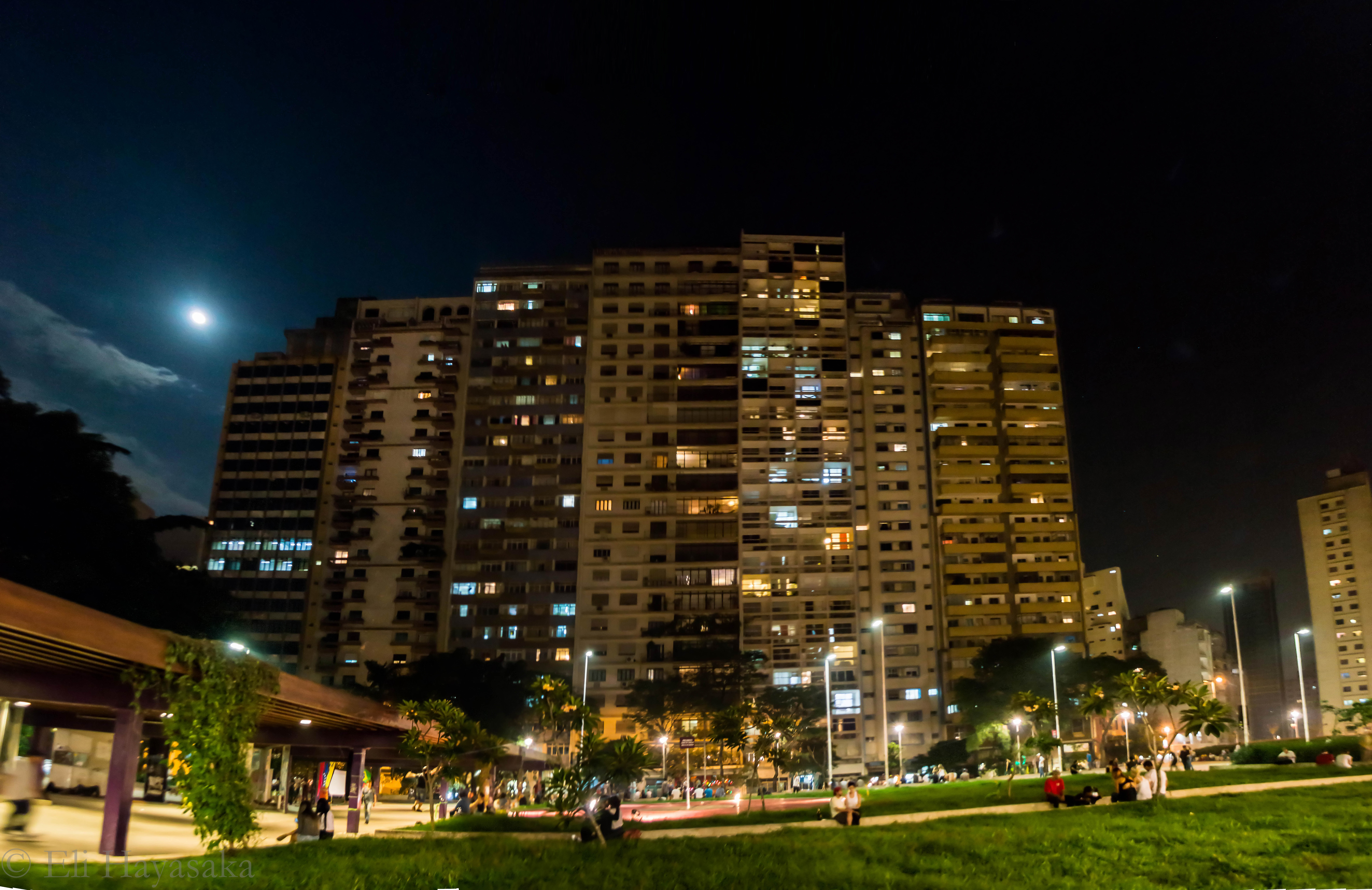
At night

Praça Roosevelt is a public square in São Paulo, Brazil. Construction of the square began in 1968 and was completed in 1970. After decades of decline, the square was renovated in 2011–12. A second renovation to expand the skate park on Praça Roosevelt was completed in November 2014.

Praça Roosevelt is located between Rua da Consolação and Rua Augusta at the beginning of the Minhocão elevated highway in downtown São Paulo.
