= Zezé Gonzaga =

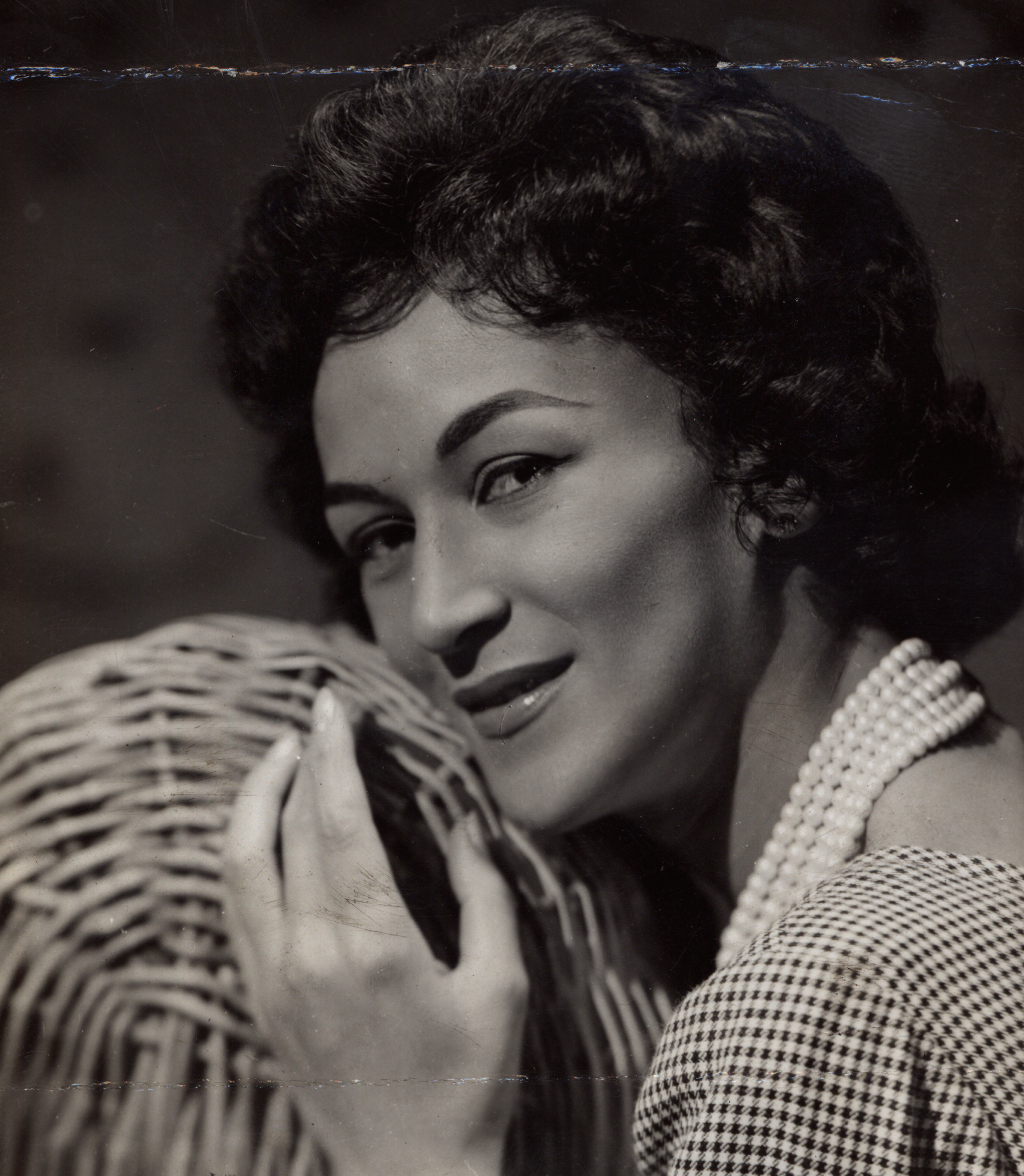
Zezé Gonzaga in 1962

Maria José Gonzaga (September 3, 1926 Manhuaçu – July 24, 2008), known as Zezé Gonzaga, was a Brazilian singer and entertainer. She died on July 24, 2008, in the city of Rio de Janeiro at the age of 81.
