= Minhocão (São Paulo) =

Highway in São Paulo

- Via Elevada "Presidente João Goulart"
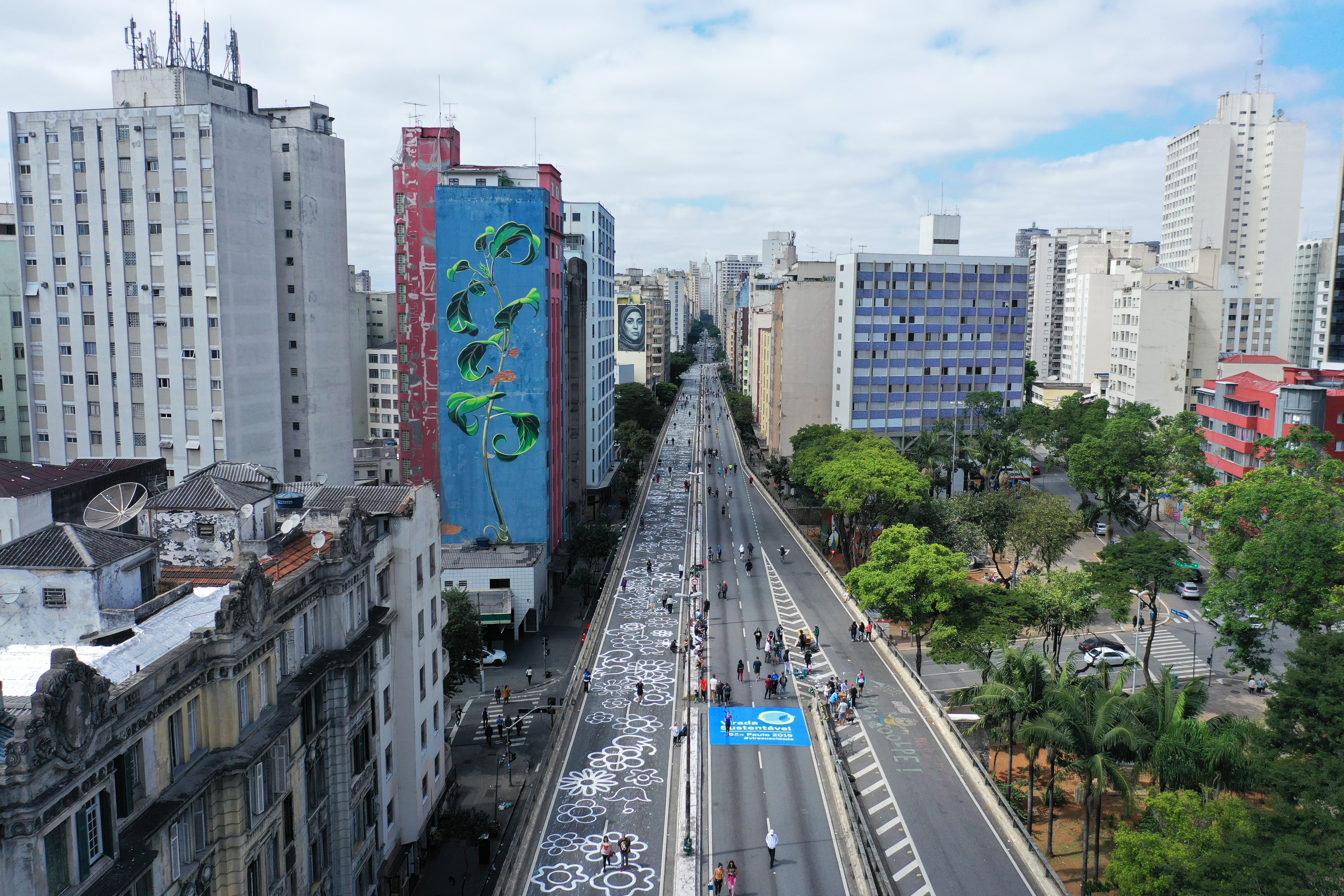
- Minhocão alongside buildings

Route information
- Length: 3.5 km (2.2 mi)
- Existed: 1971–present

Major junctions
- South end: Praça Roosevelt - Rua da Consolação in São Paulo
- West end: Largo Padre Péricles - Avenida Francisco Matarazzo in São Paulo

Location
- Country: Brazil
- State: São Paulo

Highway system
- Highways in Brazil; Federal

The Minhocão, officially "Via Elevada Presidente João Goulart", is a 3.5-kilometre (2.2-mile) elevated highway in São Paulo, Brazil. The highway was inaugurated in 1971 as Elevado Presidente Costa e Silva; its name was changed in 2016 after a law was passed changing names of all streets honoring people involved with the Brazilian military dictatorship. The road is named after the minhocão, a legendary earthworm-like cryptid.

The highway is closed to car traffic between 20:00 and 07:00 on weekdays and all day on Saturdays/Sundays, allowing dedicated use by pedestrians and cyclists. Local urban planners have long advocated tearing down the road in order to promote urban renewal.

In February 2019, Mayor Bruno Covas announced that a 900-meter section of the freeway's eastern end would be permanently closed to auto traffic and converted to “Parque Minhocão”, an elevated linear park.

== History ==
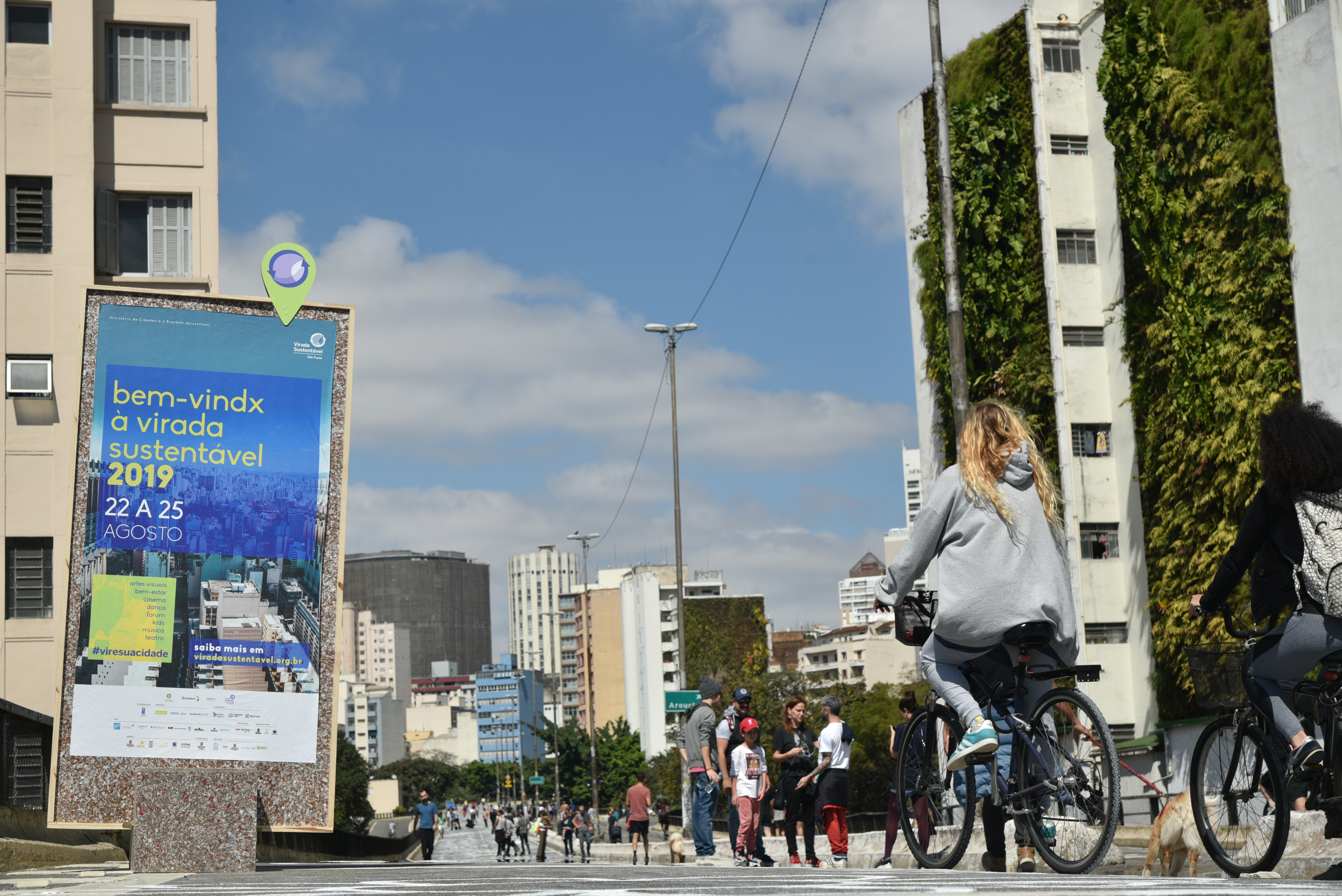
Minhocão and the Copan Building in the background

In 1969, an elevated roadway was proposed by the administration of São Paulo Mayor Paulo Maluf to help relieve traffic congestion in central São Paulo. Work on the highway, the largest infrastructure project of its time in Latin America, was completed in 1971.

Because of the noise and disturbance caused to residents—in many places the roadbed passes within 5 metres (15 feet) of apartment windows—in 1976 the municipal administration decided to close the highway to automobile traffic on Sundays and holidays. In the 1990s, residents and the administration also brokered an agreement to close the highway between the hours of 21:30 and 06:30.

== Current use ==
On weekdays, traffic volume on the elevated roadway exceeds 80,000 vehicles per day.

== Minhocão Park ==
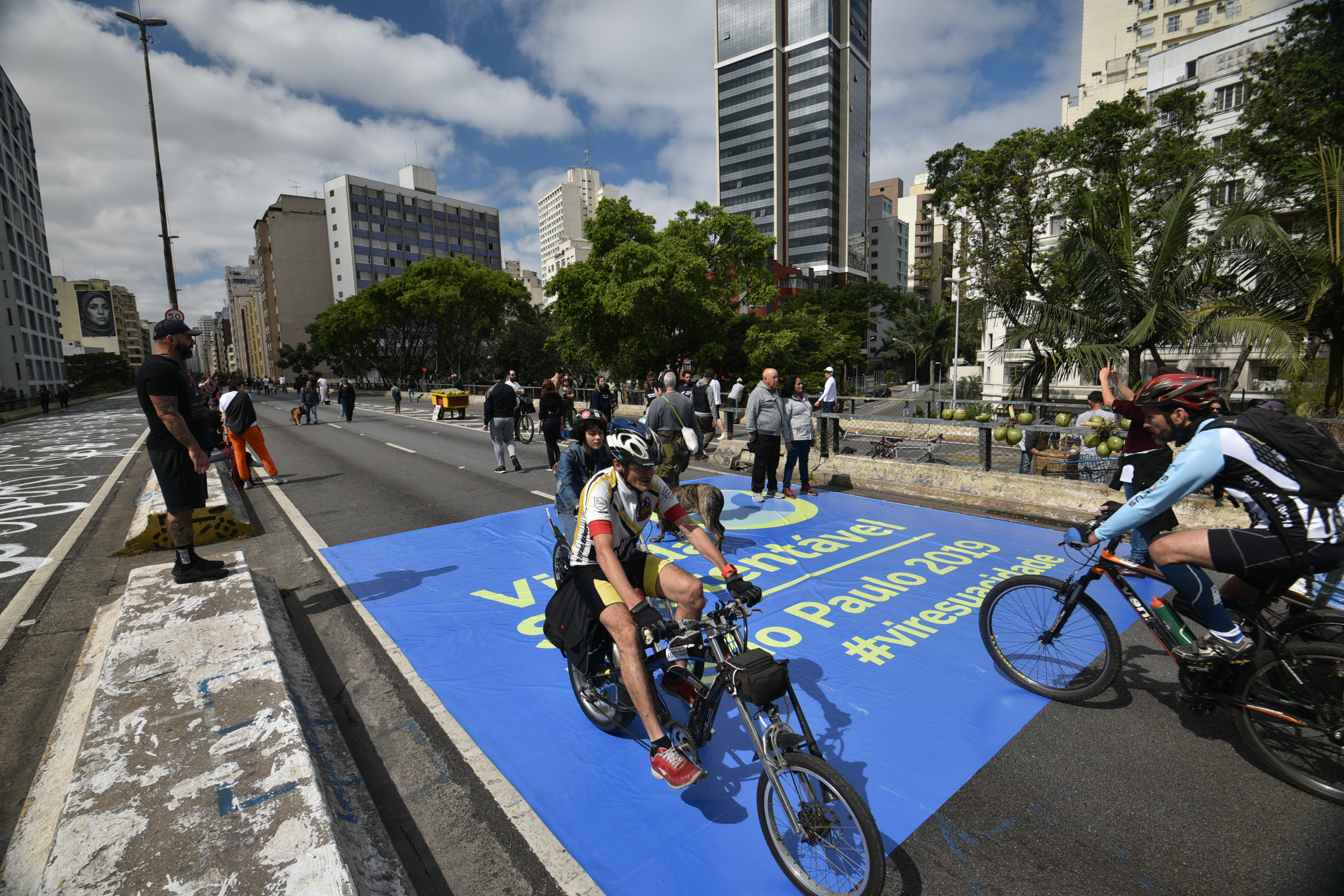
Minhocão is open to pedestrians on weekends and holidays. In the photo, cyclists and pedestrians carrying out outdoor activities

In 2013, a group of residents founded the Minhocão Park Association (Associação Parque Minhocão) to advocate converting the Minhocão to an elevated park, like the High Line in New York or the Promenade Plantée in Paris. In 2014 a study led by architect and former Curitiba mayor Jaime Lerner looked at several alternatives for the Minhocão, including demolishing the elevated roadway or transforming it into an elevated park.

In February 2019, the office of Mayor Bruno Covas announced plans to convert the eastern 900 meters of the Minhocão, above Avenida Amaral Gurgel between Rua de Consolação and Avenida São João, into an elevated park. The park will have a central bikeway and pedestrian path, with large planter boxes along the edges to provide greenery and increase privacy for neighbors. Bamboo structures will be built to provide shade. Nine new pedestrian access points, including stairways and an elevator, will connect the park to the streets below. The project is estimated to open in 2020 and cost 38 million reais. The rest of the Minhocão will remain recreational space on weekends, with auto traffic during weekdays.

== In popular culture ==
The highway's accessibility for videography has been featured extensively in Brazilian cinema, including the film Foreign Land, and in several English-language films, including Blindness and a segment of All the Invisible Children directed by Kátia Lund.
