= Minhocão (legendary creature) =

Brazilian mythical creature

Creature information
- Grouping: Cryptid
- Sub grouping: Fish, worm

Origin
- First attested: 19th century
- Country: Brazil
- Details: Lives in lakes, rivers, underground

The Minhocão is a creature from Brazilian folklore that is variously claimed to be a large fish or resembling a worm measuring 20 to 50 m (65 to 165 feet), even up to 80 m (260 feet) in length.

== Descriptions ==
The Minhocão was described to European explorers and naturalists in the 19th century by locals in Brazil. French naturalist Augustin Saint-Hilaire described in December 1846 accounts of the Minhocão in the Padre Aranda and Feia lakes, with claims that they lived in the lakes and had "often drawn horses and horned cattle under the water". He determined 'Minhocão' to be an augmentative of 'minhoca', Portuguese for earthworm. Descriptions related to him claimed the creature to have a visible mouth and that it "does not rise to the surface of the water, but that it causes animals to disappear by seizing them by the belly". Other accounts claimed the Minhocão to be "a true fish provided with fins". Saint-Hilaire speculated that the Minhocão described to him may be a large species of South American lungfish.

It was also reported in an article in a German scientific journal in 1878 by German naturalist Dr. Fritz Müller, and also summarized in Nature, largely based on accounts by Curitibanos resident Senhor Lebino. It was claimed to exist in the highlands in the South of the country and was described as a "gigantic earth worm, 50 yards [46 m] in length and 5 [4.6] in breadth, and covered with bones, as it were with a coat of mail", while other accounts describe it as "30 or 40 feet [9 or 12 m] long and a couple of yards [1.8 m] broad". It was said to uproot trees and leave deep trenches in its path, and to prefer damp conditions. The lack of sightings by humans was explained by the Minhocão having "retiring habits". Another claimed sighting came from Francisco de Amaral Varella, who stated that the creature had a snout like a pig. An earlier claim stated that it had horns. A claimed sighting of a dead Minhocão from 1849 stated that it had skin which was "as thick as the bark of a pine tree, and formed of hard scales like those of an armadillo". Müller speculated that it may be a South American lungfish or Ceratodus. The writer of the article in Nature speculated that it may be "a relic of the race of giant armadillos which in past geological epochs were so abundant in Southern Brazil".

The Minhocão has been blamed, without sightings, for damage to local roads and the appearance of deep trenches that appear after long spells of rainy weather. Claims of "a rumbling sound like thunder" accompanying its movement, led to suggestions that the Minhocão was simply being used as an explanation for seismic activity in the area. This rumbling sound was also claimed to "presage a period of rainy weather".

While scientists were generally sceptical of the veracity of these claims, in May 1878, Müller was reported to have claimed to be about to bring a dead specimen to Europe. Interest in the tale led to a London newspaper proposing in the early 20th century to send an expedition to Brazil to attempt to ascertain whether the Minhocão existed.
